= Operation Kamin =

2007 insurgent offensive in Afghanistan

- Part of the War in Afghanistan (2001–2021)
Date	May 26, 2007
Location	Kandahar Province, Afghanistan
Result	Taliban victory

Belligerents
Islamic Republic of Afghanistan; NATO	(Afghanistan) Taliban

Commanders and leaders
	(Afghanistan) Local Taliban commanders

Casualties and losses
21 killed 9 wounded	56–76 killed 1 suicide

Operation Kamin ("Ambush" in Persian) was an offensive launched by Taliban insurgents in May 2007 which aimed to kill American-backed government forces and foreign troops in Kandahar.

== Attacks ==
The operation opened with an ambush on an Afghan National Police convoy on May 26, killing two officers and wounding three others.

Taliban spokesman Qari Yousef Ahmadi phoned the media the following day, explaining the new operation's goals. That day, another attack left six police officers dead, from a mixture of explosives and gunfire. A suicide bomber also detonated himself 50 metres from the office of Governor Asadullah Khalid, wounding three security forces and a civilian passerby.

The Chenar village in the Shah Wali Kot District was the site of a four-hour gunbattle that pitched militants against Coalition forces as well as members of the ANA's 2nd Kandak, 1st Brigade, 209th Corps on June 4. When air support arrived and bombed three militant positions, it was estimated that 24 fighters were killed.

On June 5, Afghan National Army forces were ambushed by militants, who killed two of the soldiers and wounded three others, before air support killed 20-40 of the attacking militants. That evening, a pair of improvised explosive devices were detonated, failing to harm a National Directorate of Security intelligence vehicle and an Iranian consular vehicle.

Kandahar's deputy police chief, General Mohammad Daud Saleh, was killed in a drive-by shooting by insurgents on a motorcycle, making him the most senior police official killed in the province.

On June 8, a militant attack against the district office in Ghorak, Kandahar killed five police officers, but left twelve militants dead.

The following day, five more police were killed when their vehicle was struck by a rocket-propelled grenade early in the morning.
