= Dahla Dam =

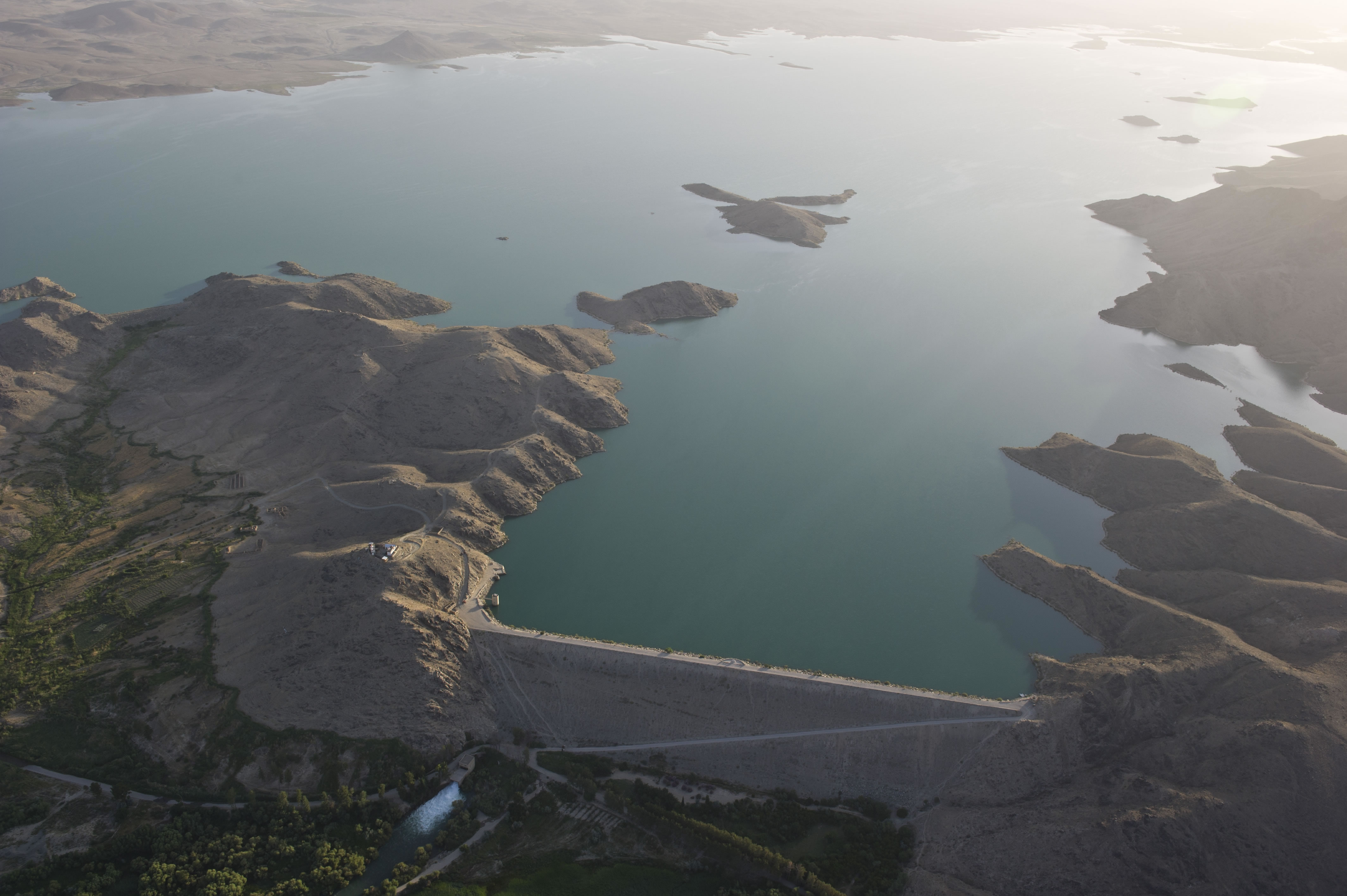
- Aerial view of the Dahla Dam in 2012

- Location within Afghanistan
- Location: Shah Wali Kot District, Kandahar Province, Afghanistan
- Coordinates: 31.855544°N 65.892413°E
- Opening date: 1952

Dam and spillways
- Impounds: Arghandab River
- Height: 55 m (180 ft)
- Length: 535 m (1,755 ft)

The Dahla Dam, also known as Arghandab Dam and Kasa, is located in the Shah Wali Kot District of Kandahar Province in Afghanistan, approximately 40 km (25 mi) northeast of the provincial capital Kandahar. Its name derives from Dahla, which is the historical name of the area where the dam was built. It is the second largest dam in Afghanistan after the Kajaki Dam in neighboring Helmand Province. In 2019, the Afghan government planned to spend $450 million in upgrading the dam. The project includes raising the dam's walls by around 13 meters so the reservoir could hold nearly a billion cubic meters of fresh water and installing three turbines to produce 22 megawatts (MW) of electricity.

The Dahla Dam was built in 1952 on the Arghandab River, which flows over a length of 250 mi (400 km). Over the decades its reservoir was subject to siltation, and its canal system reduced irrigation benefits. This necessitated undertaking rehabilitation of the dam which involved desiltation works and pertinent components of the project to improve the water delivery system; this component was completed during March 2012 with assistance provided by Canada. The second phase involved raising the height of the dam and the relevant dykes to compensate for the loss of storage in its reservoir due to siltation, and to achieve the full benefits of irrigation for which the dam was originally built.

== History ==
The Dahla Dam was completed in 1952 when relations between Afghanistan and the United States were beginning to expand. The purpose of the dam was to help farmers in Kandahar Province and provide clean drinking water to the city of Kandahar.

The Dahla Dam is an embankment structure made of earth and rock fill. It is 55 m (180 ft) in height. The length of the dam at the crest is about 535 m (1,755 ft). In the periphery of the dam six saddle dams have been built which together measure 2,040 m (6,690 ft) and with varying heights of 15–25 m (49–82 ft). To pass the design flood discharge two spillway structures have been built. To release water for irrigation to the canal system low level sluices have been built at the downstream toe of the dam with two control valves of the Howell-Bunger type which function as energy dissipation bypass valves.

The reservoir created by the dam has a storage capacity of 314 MCM. The irrigation system designed to provide irrigation to 30,000 ha (74,000 acres) of land in the Kandahar province consisted of 77.6 km (48.2 mi) of the main canal and 415 km (258 mi) of branch canals; with the main canal designed to carry a discharge of 42.5 m^{3} (1,500 cu ft) per second. The contractor for the project was Morrison Knudsen of Boise, Idaho. The dam and the irrigation system are under the control of the Helmand and Arghandab Valley Authority.

== Rehabilitation and expansion ==
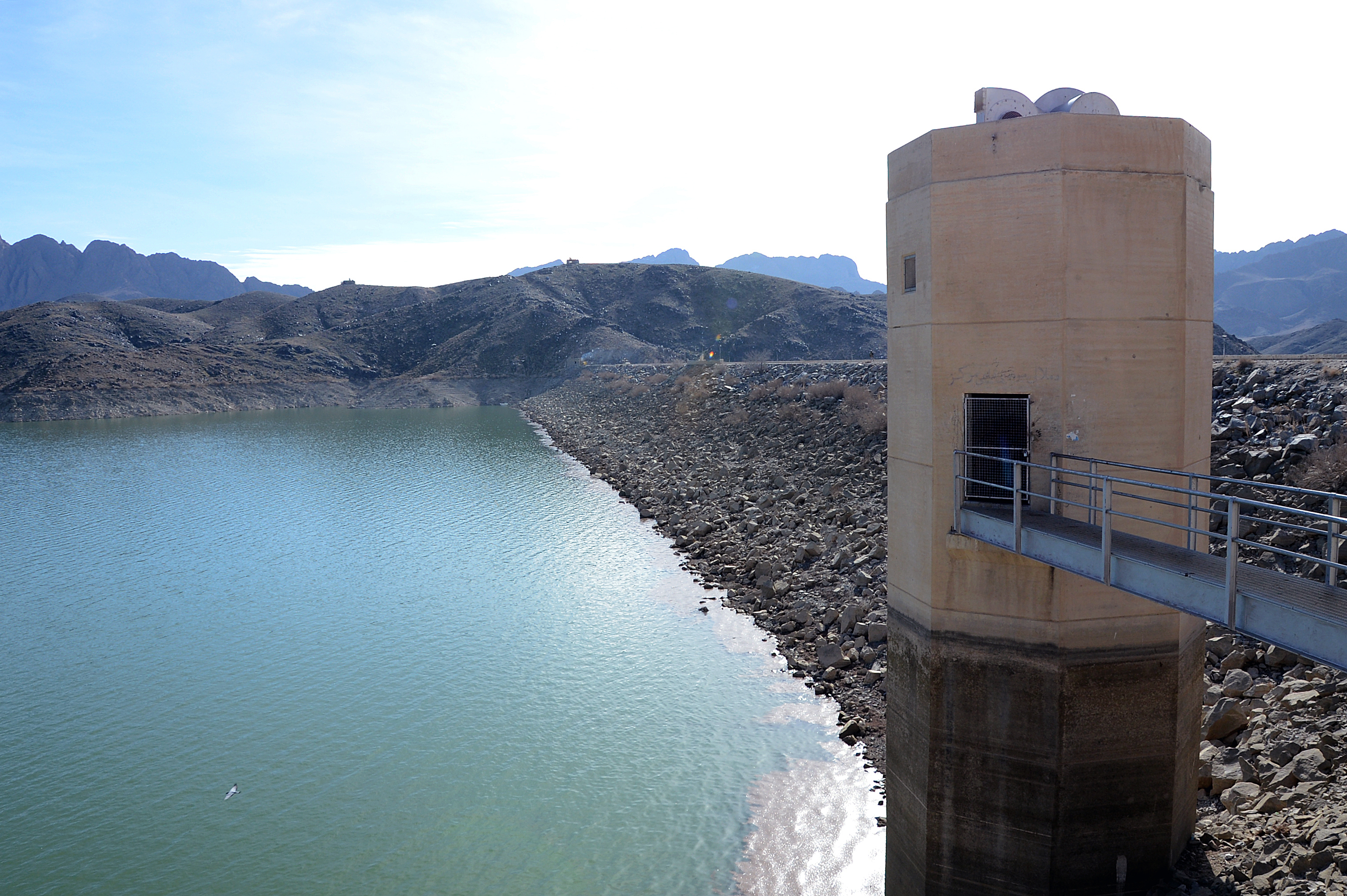
The intake tower of Dahla Dam in 2014

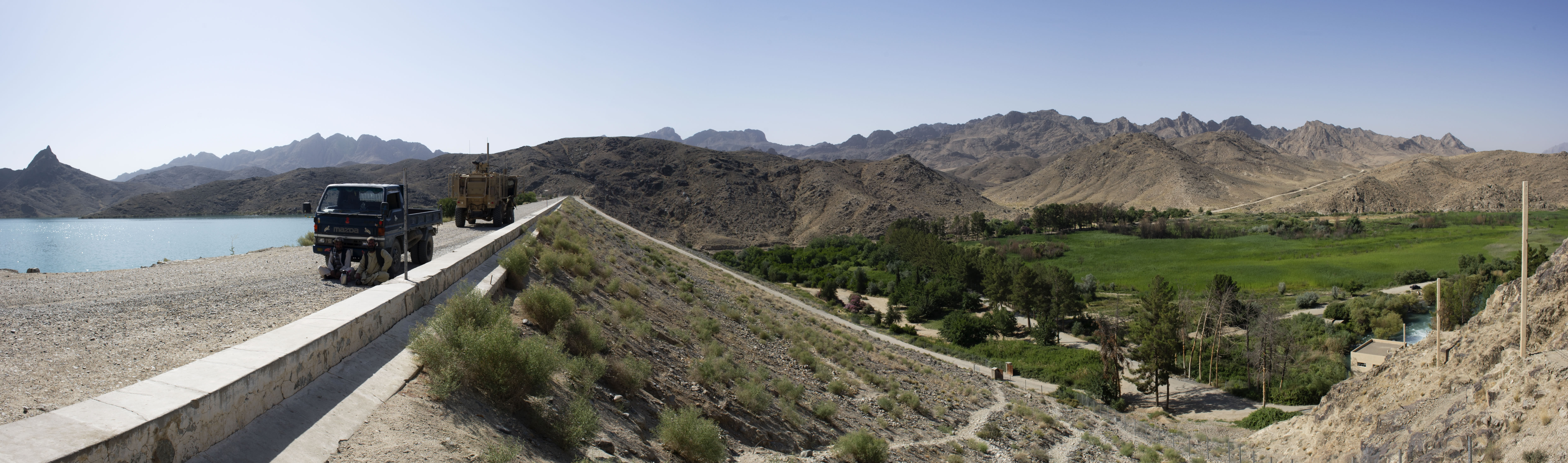
Dahla Dam in June 2012

After completion of the dam in 1952, it functioned well for many decades. However, the irrigation system and its operation was neglected during the 1980s Soviet occupation. A technical appraisal of the status of the project carried out by experts from Agriculture and Agri-Food Canada in 2008 revealed that the siltation in the reservoir had resulted in reduction of the storage capacity by 34%, irrigation system had deteriorated resulting in loss in canal discharge to the extent of 70% on account of siltation, evaporation, seepage and other defects. The intake tower of the dam was not functioning properly and control valves were leaking, spillway capacity to discharge flood waters was inadequate, and there was no operational plan. Even before the rehabilitation of dam and canal system could be initiated, as first priority the mines in the rocky areas of the reservoir area had to be cleared which was done by the U.S. Army Corps of Engineers. After this operation, a two-phase rehabilitation plan was launched.

On completion of the rehabilitation works by raising the height of the dam and related appurtenant works, and the improvements of the canal system, the volume of available water would be increased from 300 million cubic meters to 484 million cubic meters. This would facilitate irrigation to command areas in the districts of Shah Wali Kot, Arghandab, Zhari, Panjwai, Maiwand, Dand and Daman, and also help in planning and building a hydropower station to generate electricity.

=== Phase 1 ===
In the first phase the rehabilitation works were carried out by Canada during the period from 2009 to 2012 under the project titled "Arghandab Irrigation Rehabilitation Project" at a cost of nearly $44 million US dollars. Desilting and repairs to 77.6 km (48.2 mi) of main canal and about 415 km (258 mi) of branch and minor canals, replacement of water valves and erecting gates to improve control over the flow of water supplying to farm fields from the reservoir of the Dahla Dam were carried out.

=== Phase 2 ===
Raising the height of the dam is seen crucial to increasing the volume of available water, which has reduced to around 290 million cubic meters from about 500 million cubic meters water. The rehabilitation work during this phase involved raising the height of the dam by 8 m (26 ft), of saddle dams by 5–6 m (16–20 ft), spillways, and modifying structural, hydraulic and electro-mechanical features. The work was initiated by the U.S. Army Corps of Engineers but then abandoned due to a financial issue with the Afghan government.

=== Phase 3 ===
It is unknown when the third phase of the project will be completed. In this regard, former deputy Minister of Energy and Water Abdul Basir Azimi stated the following:

The third phase of the project will provide water to Kandahar City. It will help hundreds of thousands of families to have access to drinking water after it is processed. Meanwhile, three turbines will be installed on the dam. Each of them will produce eight megawatts of power. All the turbines will generate 22 megawatts of power.

According to Toryalai Mahboobi, Kandahar basin chief, the reservoir of Dahla Dam would have 950 million cubic meters of fresh water after the third phase of the project is completed.

== See also ==
- List of dams and reservoirs in Afghanistan
- Tourism in Afghanistan
