= Daman =

Daman may refer to:

== Places ==
- Dadra and Nagar Haveli and Daman and Diu, a union territory in India
  - Daman and Diu (Lok Sabha constituency)
  - Daman and Diu, former union territory of India, now part of Dadra and Nagar Haveli and Daman and Diu
  - Goa, Daman and Diu, former union territory of India, divided into Goa and Daman and Diu
  - Daman district, India
    - Daman, India, a city in India
    - Daman taluka, a taluka (subdistrict) of Daman district
- Daman District, Afghanistan
- Daman, Afghanistan, a village
- Daman, Nepal, a village
- Dammam, a city in Saudi Arabia
- Damaan Valley (Daman valley), a valley in Pakistan

== People ==
- Saint Daman, Irish Christian saint
- Damara people, also known as the Daman, an ethnic group in Namibia
- Heshana Khan (died 619), personal name Ashina Daman, a khan of the Western Turkic Khaganate
- Daman Hongren (601-674), Chinese Buddhist patriarch
- Rick Daman, Dutch sprint canoer
- Ustad Daman (1911-1984), real name Chiragh Deen, Punjabi poet and mystic
- William Daman (died 1591), musician in England

== Other uses ==
- Daman Indo-Portuguese language, spoken in Daman, India
- Daaman, an Indian TV series
- Daman (2001 film), Indian Hindi-language film starring Raveena Tandon
- Daman (2022 film), Indian Odia-language film starring Babushaan Mohanty and Dipanwit Dashmohapatra
- Daman, National Health Insurance Company, Abu Dhabi, United Arab Emirates
- Battle of Dasman Palace, also called the Battle of Daman, fought on August 2–3, 1990, during the Iraqi invasion of Kuwait
- Cyclone Daman, December 2007
- Daman, a term used in some Bible translations for the rock hyrax

== See also ==
- Daman District (disambiguation)
- Damao (disambiguation)
- Doman (disambiguation)
