= Daman District =

Daman District may refer to:

- Daman District, Afghanistan, in the Kandahar Province
- Daman district, India, in the union territory of Dadra and Nagar Haveli and Daman and Diu

== See also ==
- Daman (disambiguation)
