= Dayi, Daman District =

Village in Kandahar Province, Afghanistan

Dayi Village ډايی کلی
- Village
- قريه دايی
- Interactive map of Dayi Village
- Coordinates: 31.2°N 65.8°E
- Country: Afghanistan
- Province: Kandahar Province
- Established: 01 Jan 1850 AD
- Founded by: Nazeer Khan Barakzai نظير خان بارکزی
- District: Daman

Government
  - Leader: Muhammad Noor Yaqoubi

Population (2013)
  - Total: 2,500
- Time zone: + 4.30

Dayi is a village in the central part of the Daman District, Kandahar Province, Afghanistan. It borders Landai Killi to the south, Byaban Darah village to the north, Syedan Kalacha to the north and Kandahar Boldak Highway to the west, The population is 2500 (2013). The center is the village of Daman, located in the central part of the district. The area is irrigated by the Arghasan River.

The Kandahar International Airport is in the South-West of the village. Its to be mentioned that, the airport is currently focused by US Army.

This village belongs to the family of Nazir Khan S/O Fateh Khan tribe Barakzai sub tribe OmerKhanzai. Nazir Khan's three sons Abdul Karim Khan, Jalal Khan, Khan came from Mard Qala a village of Dand District Kandahar to Dayi and settled here. They bought all the land of Dayi (20,000 Jaribs approx) from people of Mohammadzai and Sadduzai tribes.
