= Reiz =

Reiz may refer to:

- 3871 Reiz, an asteroid named after astronomer Anders Reiz
- Anders Reiz (1915–2000), a Danish astronomer
- Jakub Polak (musician) (c. 1545 – c. 1605; a.k.a. Jakub de Reiz), a Polish lutenist and composer
- Khakrez (also: Khak Reiz), a village in Afghanistan
- Toyota Mark X, an automobile, sold as the "Reiz" in China
