= Mianshin District =

District of Kandahar District, Afghanistan

Miyanishin District (Pashto: ميه نشين ولسوالۍ, romanized: miya nishin wuləswāləi) is a new district of Kandahar District, Afghanistan, created in 2005. It was formerly in the northern part of Shah Wali Kot District. The population is 16,713 (2019).
