= Doman =

Doman may refer to:

- Doman (surname)
- Doman (river), Caraș-Severin County, Romania
- Doman, a village in Reșița city, Caraș-Severin County, Romania
- Doman Helicopters, an American helicopter manufacturing company
- Doman (Khoikhoi) (died 1663), a Khoikhoi leader in the First Khoikhoi-Dutch War
- Doman: Grzechy Ardana, a 1995 Amiga game

== See also ==
- Doman Scandal, a Canadian political scandal
- Daman (disambiguation)
