= Dayi =

Dayi may refer to:

- Dayi, Daman District, village in Daman District, Kandahar Province, Afghanistan
- Dayi method, a computer input method
- South Dayi District, Volta Region, Ghana
- North Dayi, one of the constituencies represented by the Parliament of Ghana
- Dayi language, spoken by the Indigenous people of the Arnhem Land, Australia

== China ==
- Dayi County (大邑县), of Chengdu, Sichuan
- Dayi, Yizheng (大仪镇), town in Yizheng City, Jiangsu
- Dayi, Juye County (大义镇), town in Juye County, Shandong
- Dayi, Leiyang (大义镇), a town of Leiyang City, Hunan

== See also ==
- Dayi Pier-2 light rail station
