= Khakriz =

Khakriz or Khak Riz (Persian: خاكريز) may refer to:

- Khakrez, Afghanistan
- Khakriz, Ardabil
- Khakriz, Hamadan
- Khakriz, Zanjan
