= Ghorak District =

District of Kandahar Province, Afghanistan

Ghorak district (Pashto: غورک ولسوالۍ) is situated in the northwestern part of Kandahar Province, Afghanistan. It borders Helmand Province to the West, Oruzgan Province and Naish District to the North, Khakrez District to the East and Maywand District to the South. The population is 8,600 (2006). The district center is the village of Ghorak, located in its western part.
