= Damao =

Damao may refer to:

- Daman, India, a city in Dadra and Nagar Haveli and Daman and Diu, India
- Former name of Minxiong, a rural township in Chiayi County, Taiwan

== See also ==
- Daman (disambiguation)
