= Rona Tarin =

Afghan politician and activist (born 1971)

- رڼا ترين
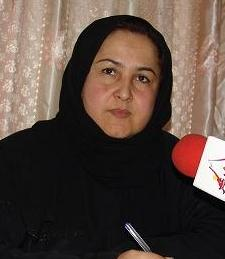
- Tarin in 2007

Member of the House of Elders
- Incumbent
- Assumed office 2011
- Constituency: Kandahar

Personal details
- Born: 1971 (age 54–55) Dand District, Kingdom of Afghanistan

Rona Tarin (Pashto: رڼا ترين; born 1971) is an Afghan politician and women's rights activist.

== Life ==
Tarin was born in Dand District to Haji Fida Mohammad in 1971. She is Pashtun. Tarin completed a bachelor's degree in Kandahar. She is a women's rights activist. Tarin was a candidate for the House of the People in 2005 and 2010 but was not elected. From 2007 to 2010, Tarin was the provincial director for the Ministry of Women's Affairs' office in Kandahar Province after her predecessor, Safia Amajan, was murdered. In May 2010, fearing for her safety as several other Kandahar female activists and government officials had been killed including Malalai Kakar and Sitara Achakzai, Tarin ran for parliament in Kabul. She was appointed as a member of the House of Elders in 2011 and 2018.
