= Ghorak =

Settlement in Kandahar, Afghanistan

- Location in Afghanistan
- Coordinates: 32°2′0″N 65°8′2″E
- Country: Afghanistan
- Province: Kandahar Province
- Elevation: 3,914 ft (1,193 m)
- Time zone: UTC+4:30

Ghorak (Pashto: غورک) is a village in the center of the Ghorak District in Kandahar Province, Afghanistan.

== See also ==
- Kandahar Province
