= Khakrez District =

Khakrez District خاکریز
- District
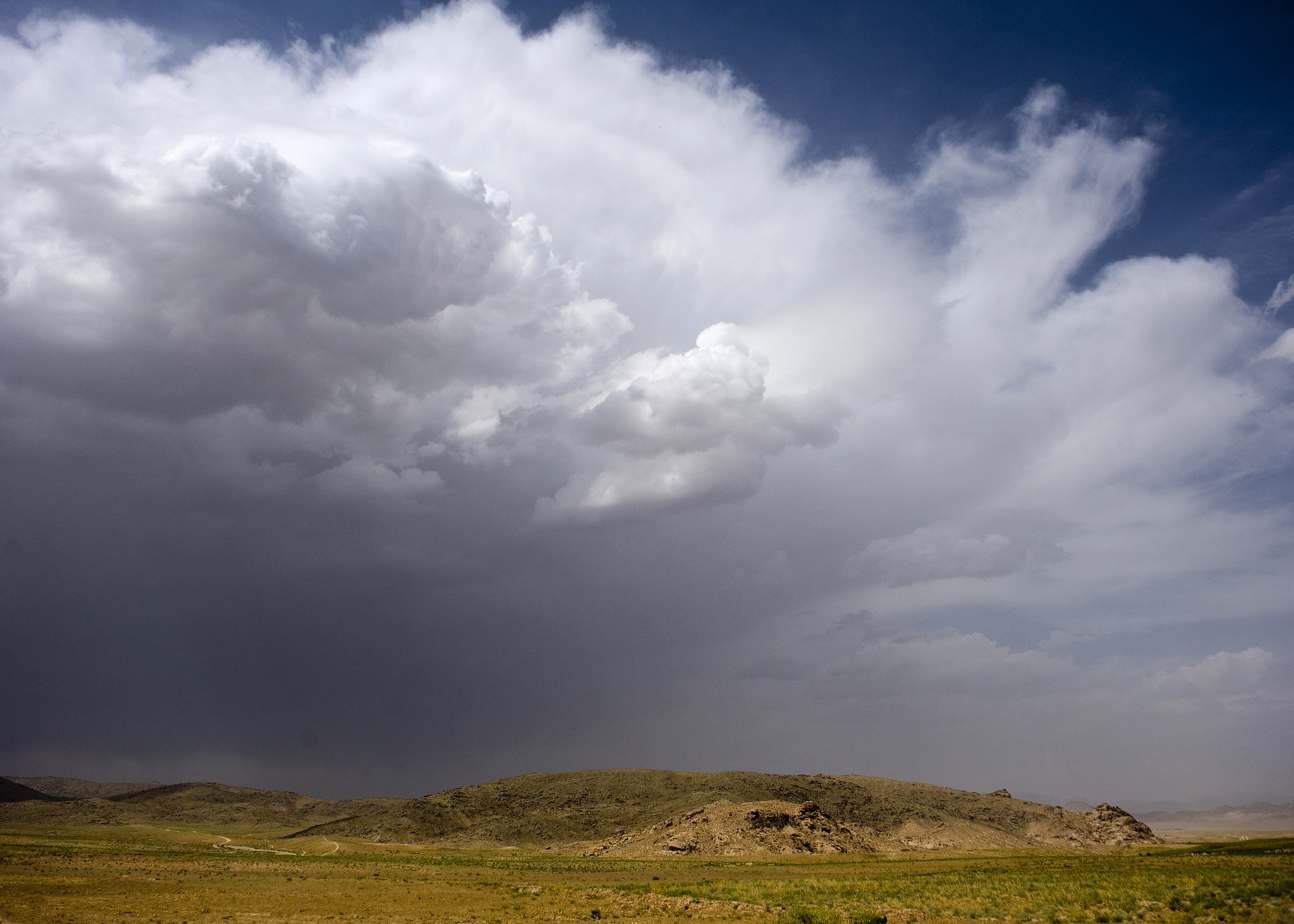
- Khakrez in spring time

- Location in Afghanistan (dot indicates the town of Khakrez)
- Coordinates: 31.985°N 65.472778°E
- Country: Afghanistan
- Province: Kandahar Province
- Time zone: + 4.30

Khakrez District (Pashto: خاکریز ولسوالۍ) is a rural agrarian community with a population of more than 20,000 located in north-central Kandahar Province. A village known variously as Khakrez or Darvishan, at the base of mountains in the western part of the district, is the location of the district center building and the Shah Agha Shrine or Shah Maqsud Shrine, one of the oldest historical Islamic sites in Afghanistan.

The district borders Ghorak District to the west, Maywand and Zhari districts to the south, Arghandab and Shah Wali Kot districts to the east and Naish District to the north. Before Zhari District was created in 2004, it bordered Panjwai District.
