= Doman (surname) =

Doman is a surname. It is of English Origin and means "doom-man" or judge.

Notable people with the surname include:

- Amanda Doman (born 1977), Australian softball player
- Brandon Doman (born 1976), American college football quarterback, coach and offensive coordinator
- Cătălin Doman (born 1988), Romanian footballer
- David Doman, American electrical engineer
- George Doman (born 1983), American hip-hop artist and disability advocate
- Jim Doman (1949–1992), American poker player
- John Doman (born 1945), American actor
- Tommy Doman (born 2002), American football player
- Willem Doman (born 1950), South African politician
