= Khakrez =

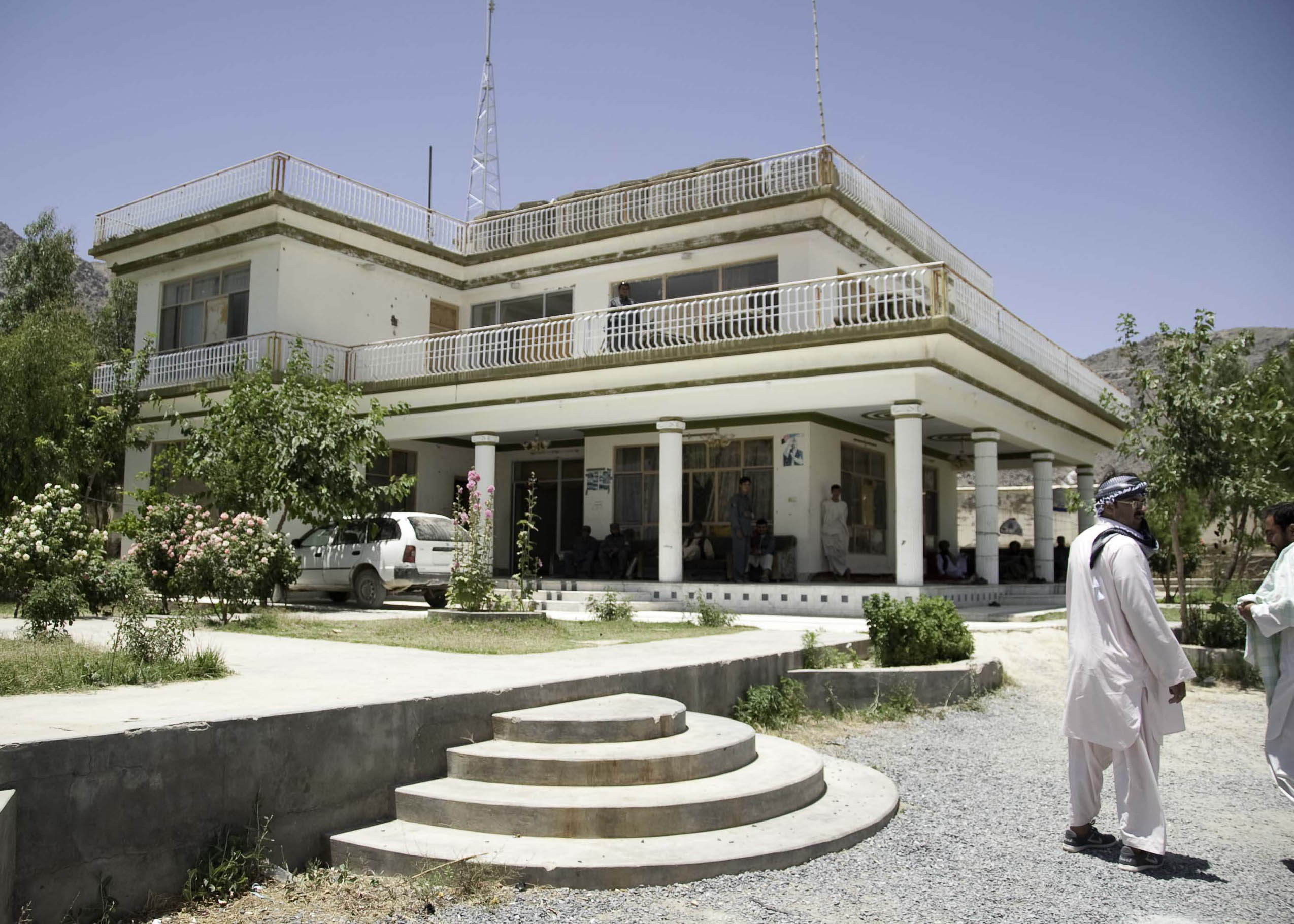
- Khakrez district center, Khakrez, 2010

- Location in Afghanistan
- Coordinates: 31°59′6″N 65°28′22″E
- Country: Afghanistan
- Province: Kandahar Province
- District: Khakrez District
- Elevation: 4,974 ft (1,516 m)
- Time zone: UTC+4:30

Khakrez, (Pashto: خاکریز) also written Khakriz and Khak Reiz, is a village and the district center of Khakrez District, Kandahar Province, Afghanistan. It is located at the base of a mountain range in the western part of the district at 31.9856°N 65.4728°E and 1,516 m altitude. It (or an adjacent village) is also known as Darvishan. Khakrez is the location of the district center building and the Shah Agha Shrine or Shah Maqsud Shrine, one of the oldest historical Islamic sites in Afghanistan.
