= Hajji Jamal Khan =

Hajji Jamal Khan حاجي جمال خان
- Hajji

Grand Vizier of the Durrani Empire
- Grand Vizier: 1747 – 1772
- Predecessor: Office established
- Successor: Rahimdad Khan
- Born: 1719; Kandahar, Hotak Empire
- Died: 1772 (aged 52–53); Kandahar, Durrani Empire
- Cause of death: Natural Causes
- Spouse: 2 wives: A Ghilji lady A Barakzai lady
- Issue: 4 sons and 1 daughter: Abdul Habib Khan Bahadur Khan Rahimdad Khan Payandah Khan Unknown daughter; wife of Timur Shah Durrani
- House: Barakzai dynasty
- Father: Mohammad Yusuf Khan
- Mother: A Ghilji lady

Hajji Jamal Khan Barakzai (Note: Pashto: حاجي جمال خان بارکزی, romanized: Hājji Jamāl Xān Bārakzai [ʔɑ.d͡ʒi d͡ʒa.mɑl xɑn bɑ.ɾak.zaɪ, hɑ.d͡ʒi d͡ʒa.mɑl xɑn bɑ.ɾak.zaɪ]; Persian: حاجی جمال خان بارکزی, romanized: Hājjī Jamāl Khān Bārakzay [ʔɑː.d͡ʒíː d͡ʒä.mɑ́ːl xɑːn bɑː.ɾäkʰ.záj, hɑː.d͡ʒíː d͡ʒä.mɑ́ːl xɑːn bɑː.ɾäkʰ.záj]) (born Jamal al-Din Khan Mohammadzai; 1719–1772) was chief of the Barakzai tribe, Afsharid governor of Farah and Grishk, and Grand Vizier of the Durrani Empire under the reigns of Ahmad Shah Durrani and Timur Shah Durrani until his death in 1772.

== Early life ==
Jamal Khan was born to Mohammad Yusuf Khan, a member of the Mohammadzai branch of the Barakzai Pashtun tribe and to a Ghilji Pashtun mother. He attained the title of Hajji after of his trip to Mecca for performing the Islamic pilgrimage of Hajj.

== Rise to power ==
During a grand national assembly regarding electing a new Afghan king that took place in the city of Kandahar after the assassination of Nader Shah, Jamal Khan was a candidate alongside his Sadozai rival Ahmad Khan Abdali. The prominence of the Barakzai tribe of Pashtuns among the Abdali confederacy, as well as the status and seniority of Jamal Khan gave him more legitimacy and a right to claim the throne.

However, Ahmad Khan then rose to fame under the intervention of Pir Sabir Shah who believed argued that Ahmad Khan's Sadozai lineage gave him a legitimate claim to the throne. Despite disagreements among other Abdali tribes, Sabir symbolically placed a turban with a sheaf wheat on Ahmad Khan's turban, declaring him King, and ever since then he was called Ahmad Shah, while his tribal confederacy was changed from Abdali to Durrani in honor of bearing the title "Shah, Pearl of the Pearls".

== Death and legacy ==
Jamal Khan died in 1772, and his eldest son Rahimdad Khan succeeded him as chief of the Barakzais and the Grand Vizier of the Durrani Empire. His descendants would then be involved in a blood feud with the descendants of Ahmad Shah Durrani and establish the Emirate of Kabul, Principality of Kandahar and the Sultan Mohammad Khan in opposition to the Durrani dynasty that ruled the Durrani Empire, as well as installing Durrani rulers as puppets.
