= Kandahar Province =

Province of Afghanistan

Kandahar کندهار
- Province
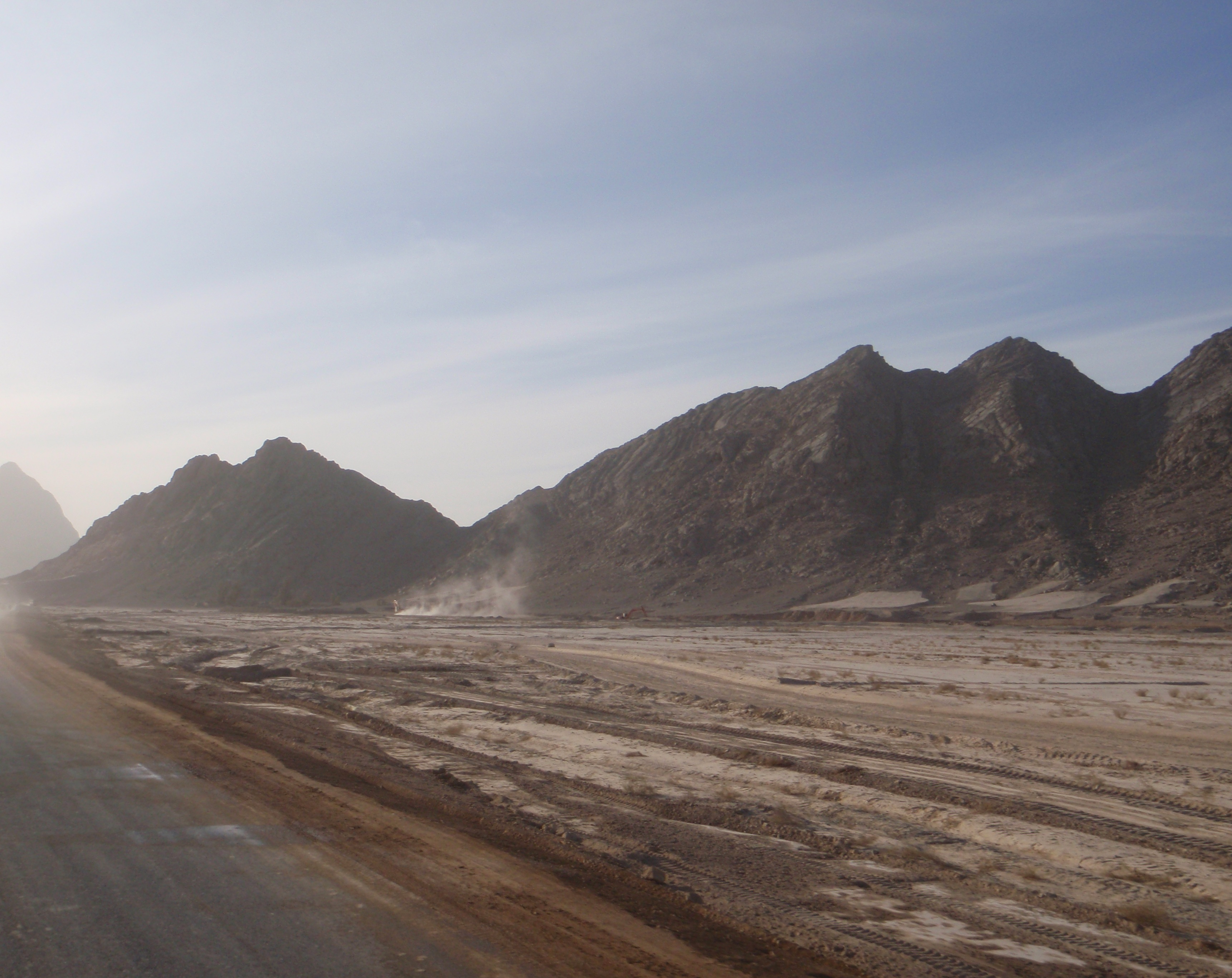
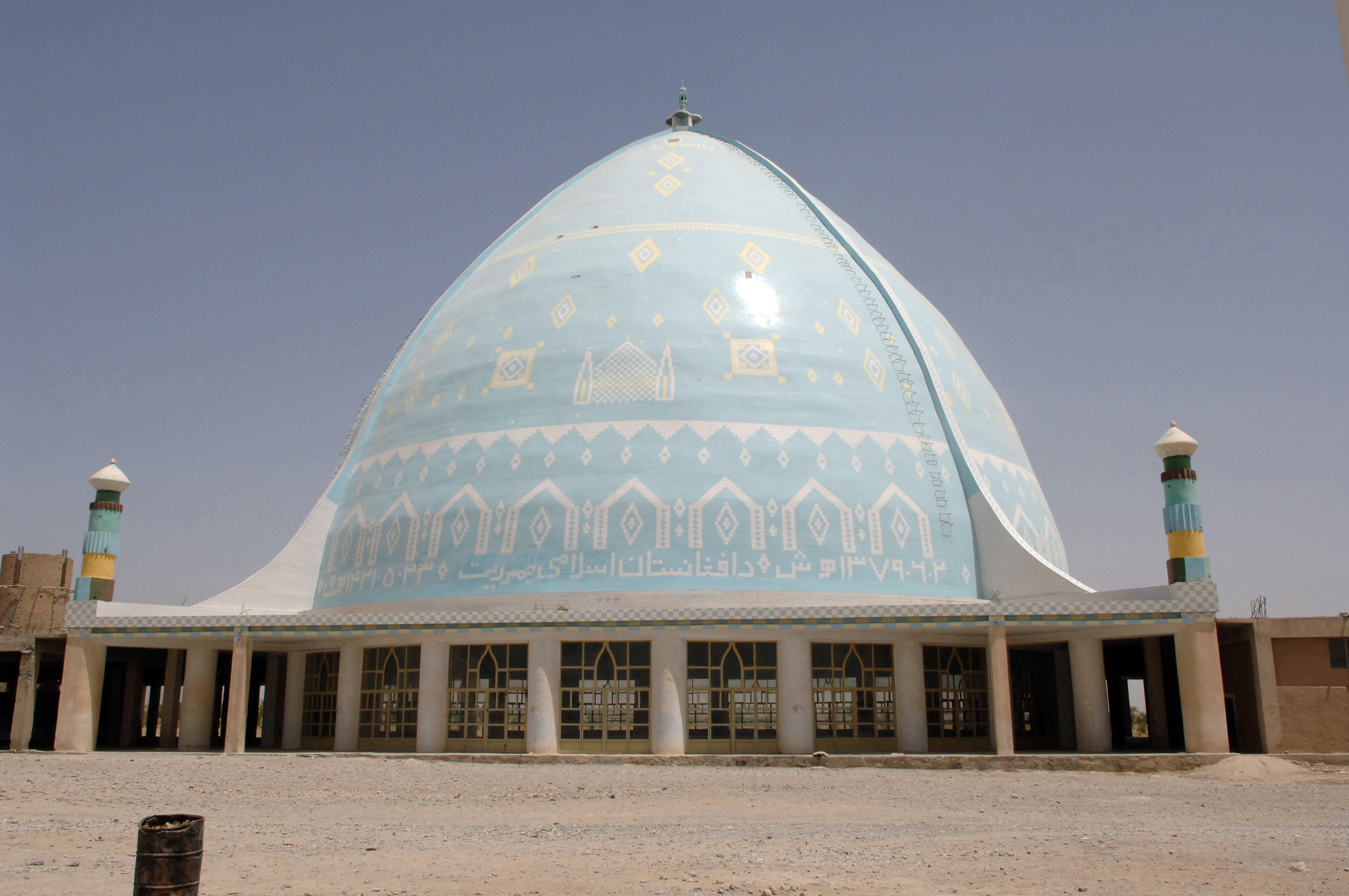
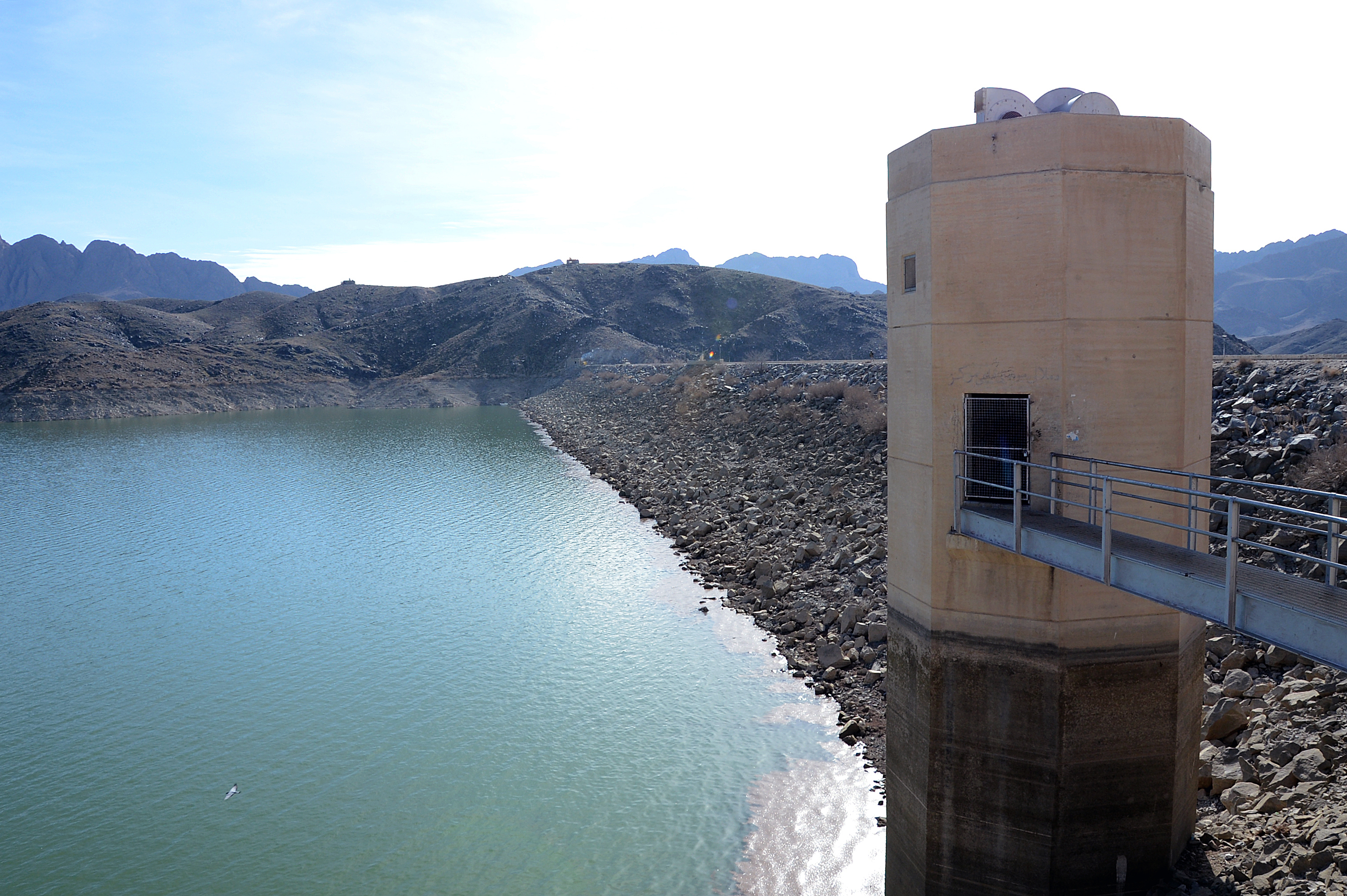
- From the top, Panjwayi District, Kandahar University, Dahla Dam

- Map of Afghanistan with Kandahar highlighted
- Coordinates (Capital): 31.0°N 65.5°E
- Country: Afghanistan
- Capital: Kandahar

Government
  - Governor: Mullah Shirin Akhund

Area
  - Total: 54,844 km^{2} (21,175 sq mi)

Population (2023)
  - Total: c. 1.5 million
  - Density: 27.4/km^{2} (71/sq mi)
- Demonym: Kandahari
- Time zone: UTC+4:30 (Afghanistan Time)
- Postal code: 38xx
- Area code: AF-KAN
- Main languages: Pashto
- Website: https://kandahar.gov.af/

Kandahar (Note: Pashto: Pashto pronunciation: [kən̪d̪əhɑɾ]: کندهار Dari: Dari pronunciation: [kan̪d̪ahɑːɾ]: کندهار) is one of the southern provinces of Afghanistan and is widely regarded as one of the country's most historically influential and politically significant regions. It borders Helmand to the west, Uruzgan to the north, Zabul to the east, and the Balochistan province of Pakistan to the south. The provincial capital is the city of Kandahar, which functions as the main administrative, economic, and cultural center of southern Afghanistan called Loy Kandahar.

Covering an area of approximately 54,000 square kilometers and having an estimated population of about 1.5 million people, Kandahar is characterized by its arid climate, desert landscapes, and fertile agricultural zones along the Arghandab River. The province plays a central role in Afghanistan's agricultural economy, particularly in the production of pomegranates, grapes, wheat, and other cash crops. Kandahar also contains numerous archaeological and historical sites, reflecting its long and continuous human habitation.

Historically, Kandahar has served as a crucial gateway between South Asia, the Iranian Plateau, and Central Asia. The region was part of ancient Arachosia and later became an important center under Achaemenid, Hellenistic, Kushan, and Islamic rule. In the modern era, Kandahar gained national prominence as the birthplace of Ahmad Shah Durrani, the founder of the modern Afghan state in the 18th century, establishing the province as the symbolic heartland of Afghan statehood and Pashtun political power.

Today, Kandahar remains one of the most strategically important provinces of Afghanistan due to its geographic position, economic role, and political influence, with the city of Kandahar de facto serving as the seat of national power since 2021 due to the permanent presence of the Taliban's supreme leadership in the city. While the province continues to face significant challenges related to security, governance, and infrastructure development, it retains a strong regional identity rooted in its historical legacy, tribal traditions, and agricultural productivity.

== Etymology ==
There is long-standing scholarly speculation surrounding the origin of the name Kandahar. One theory traces the name to the Kandhāra, believed to be a linguistically altered form of Gandhāra (Sanskrit: कंधार), a historically significant region referenced as early as 2000–1700 BCE. This interpretation suggests a deep pre-Hellenistic linguistic continuity in the broader region of southern Afghanistan.

The more widely accepted explanation, however, links the name directly to Alexander the Great. Kandahar is believed to have originated as one of the many cities named after the Hellenistic conqueror across his former Achaemenid domains, with its ancient name being Alexandria Arachosia (Ancient Greek: Ἀλεξάνδρεια Ἀραχωσία). The modern form Kandahar (Pashto: کندهار) is thought to derive from the adaptation of Iskandariya (Arabic: الإسكندرية), itself based on Alexándreia (Ancient Greek: Ἀλεξάνδρεια). Archaeological evidence supports this Hellenistic connection. A temple dedicated to the deified Alexander has been identified in the old citadel, along with a significant bilingual inscription in Greek and Aramaic issued by the Mauryan emperor Ashoka, who ruled a few decades after Alexander's campaigns.

== History ==
=== Antiquity ===
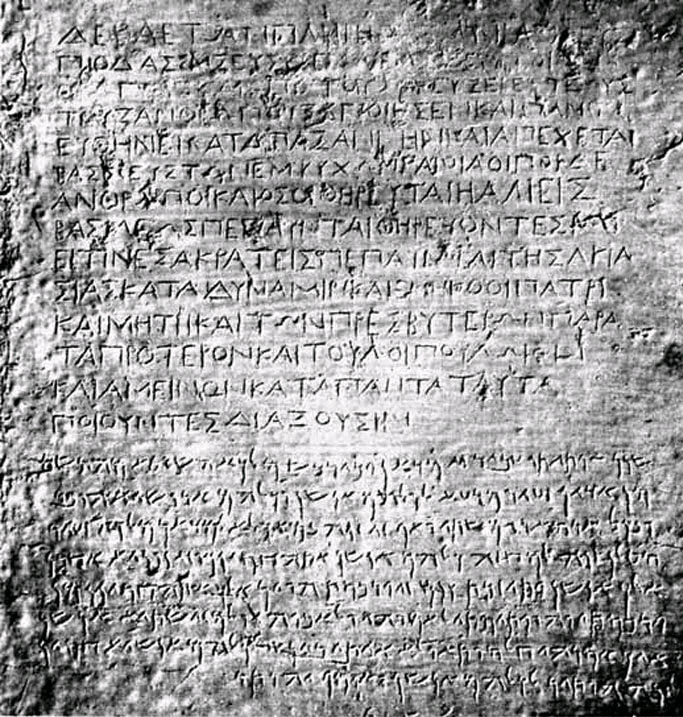
Bilingual Greek and Aramaic inscriptions by king Ashoka at modern-day Old Kandahar from the 3rd century BC

Kandahar and its surrounding region have been inhabited for more than 7,000 years, making it one of the oldest continuously settled areas in the world. Archaeological excavations at populated places near modern Kandahar reveal early farming villages dating to approximately 5000 BCE, featuring multiroomed mudbrick houses, pottery kilns, and evidence of organized agricultural production. Excavations at the nearby caves yielded Bronze Age artifacts, including copper and bronze tools, horse trappings, and stone seals, indicating early technological advancement and trade. Stylistically, these artifacts show cultural links with the Indus Valley civilization, the Iranian plateau, and Central Asia, suggesting Kandahar's integration into a wide prehistoric trade and cultural network.

During antiquity, the region was known as Arachosia, strategically situated between South Asia, Central Asia, and the Iranian plateau. Its location along river valleys, such as the Arghandab, and early trade routes made it a coveted territory. Arachosia became a satrapy of the Achaemenid Empire, serving as a hub for administration, taxation, and military control in the eastern territories of the empire. In 330 BCE, Alexander the Great conquered Arachosia and founded Alexandria Arachosia, which functioned as both a military stronghold and a commercial center connecting Hellenistic, Persian, and Indian spheres. After Alexander's death, the city fell under the Seleucid Empire and later came under the Mauryan Empire, highlighting the spread of Buddhism and the region's integration into South Asian cultural networks. The geographic advantages, fertile land, and strategic position established Arachosia as a crucial nexus of commerce, culture, and military power in antiquity.

=== Medieval times ===
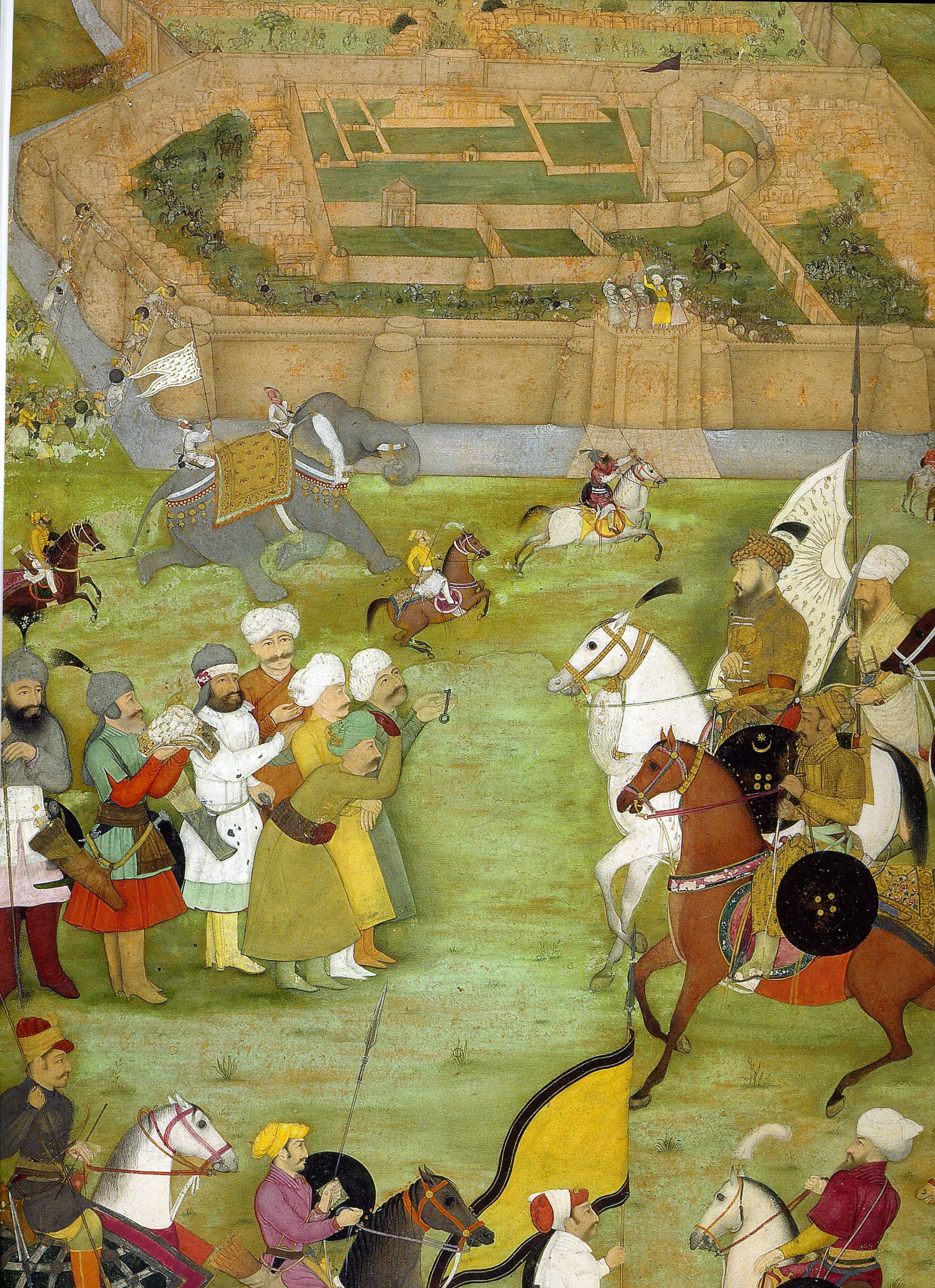
A miniature from Padshahnama depicting the surrender of the Shia Safavid at what is now Old Kandahar in 1638 to the Mughal army of Shah Jahan commanded by Kilij Khan

The medieval period in Kandahar saw successive waves of conquest, settlement, and cultural transformation. After the decline of Hellenistic and Mauryan influence, the region was ruled by local dynasties, most notably the Zunbils, who maintained semi-independent control until the 7th century CE. The arrival of Arab forces under the Umayyad Caliphate introduced Islam, though initial control was largely temporary. By the 9th century, the Saffarid dynasty consolidated Islamic authority in modern-day southern Afghanistan, while the eastern territories remained under the Hindushahis, a Hindu dynasty controlling parts of Gandhara.

In the 10th and 11th centuries, Kandahar became part of the Ghaznavid Empire under Mahmud of Ghazni, who implemented centralized administration, collected taxes, and expanded trade networks into northern India. The Ghaznavids facilitated the spread of Islamic culture, architecture, and Persian administrative systems. They were succeeded by the Ghurids, who maintained Kandahar as a strategic military and administrative center.

The 13th century brought devastation during Mongol invasions under Genghis Khan, resulting in widespread destruction and population displacement. Reconstruction occurred under the Timurids, who strengthened fortifications, rebuilt urban infrastructure, and promoted trade, while delegating governance to family members such as Pir Muhammad ibn Jahangir in the late 14th and early 15th century. Kandahar's position as a crossroads for trade and military campaigns remained central to its identity during this period.

=== Early modern period ===
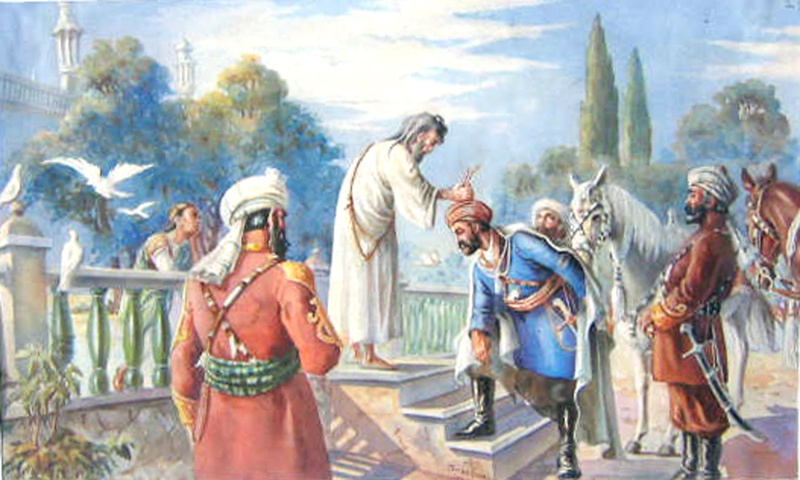
Painting by Abdul Ghafoor Breshna depicting the 1747 coronation of Ahmad Shah Durrani, who is regarded as the founding father of Afghanistan (Father of the Nation).

From the 16th century onward, Kandahar was at the center of repeated conflicts between regional powers. The city was contested between the Mughal Empire and the Safavid dynasty of Persia, reflecting both strategic and religious rivalries between Sunni and Shia rulers. Babur briefly captured the city, but it ultimately fell under Safavid control. During this period, Kandahar's fortifications were rebuilt multiple times to withstand sieges, and the city functioned as a provincial administrative and military center.

In 1709, Mirwais Hotak successfully rebelled against the Safavids, founding the Hotak dynasty and establishing Kandahar as the political heart of a Pashtun-led empire. The Hotaki rulers consolidated local authority and defended the region against Persian encroachment. In 1738, Nader Shah of Persia defeated the last Hotaki ruler, Shah Hussain Hotak, briefly restoring Persian influence. Soon after, in 1747, Ahmad Shah Durrani established the Durrani Empire, often considered the foundation of modern Afghanistan, making Kandahar its initial capital. Under Durrani, the city was the seat of imperial administration, military organization, and tribal coordination, though the capital later moved to Kabul in the 1770s.

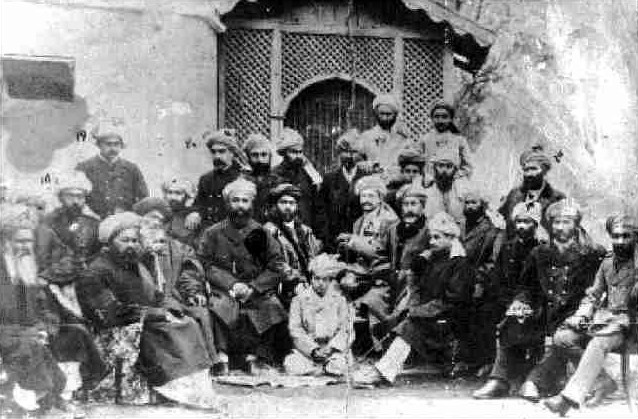
Afghan military commanders on 2 September 1880, about a month after their victory at the Battle of Maiwand

Throughout the 19th and early 20th centuries, Kandahar was influenced by broader geopolitical struggles. The city was occupied temporarily by British-led forces during the First and Second Anglo-Afghan Wars (1832–1842 and 1878–1880), highlighting its strategic significance in the British-Russian Great Game. In the mid-20th century, Kandahar also became a commercial hub along trade routes leading to India and a notable stop for travelers, including participants in the Hippie trail, reflecting its continuing economic and cultural relevance. Infrastructure, agriculture, and local governance expanded under various Afghan governments, though the city's growth remained constrained by periodic tribal conflicts and regional instability.

=== During war times (1979–2021) ===
The Soviet invasion of Afghanistan in 1979 marked the beginning of a prolonged period of armed conflict in Kandahar. During the Soviet–Afghan War, the province became a major center of mujahideen resistance, benefiting from its rugged terrain, tribal networks, and proximity to the Pakistan border, which allowed insurgent forces to operate effectively. The city of Kandahar and its surrounding districts experienced significant destruction, population displacement, and disruptions to trade and agriculture. Following the Soviet withdrawal from Afghanistan in 1989, governance of the province was contested among local warlords, with Gul Agha Sherzai emerging as a prominent authority figure in the early 1990s, amid continuing instability and localized conflict.

In 1994, Kandahar became the birthplace of the Taliban movement, led by Mullah Omar, who sought to consolidate political authority and restore order following years of civil war. The city quickly became the movement's de facto capital, from which it extended control over much of southern and eventually all of Afghanistan. Under Taliban rule, Kandahar experienced the imposition of strict Sharia law, limited political pluralism, and attempts—largely unsuccessful—to regulate the opium economy.

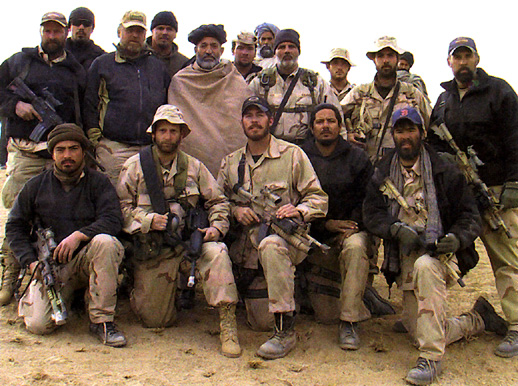
Operational Detachment Alpha 574 of the U.S. Army Special Forces alongside Hamid Karzai in the province in October 2001

Following the U.S.-led invasion of Afghanistan in 2001, prompted by the September 11 attacks, Kandahar fell to the Northern Alliance in December, ending Taliban governance in the province at that time. The city then became a hub for international military operations, reconstruction, and counterinsurgency efforts, with arrested or suspected insurgents being transferred from the Kandahar detention center to the Guantanamo Bay naval base, while others detained by coalition forces were handed over to the Afghan intelligence service, the National Directorate of Security, where some reportedly faced torture during interrogation. Despite the establishment of local governance under figures such as Hamid Karzai, the province remained a stronghold of Taliban insurgency. Throughout the 2000s and 2010s, Kandahar saw recurring attacks, targeted assassinations, and ongoing challenges to infrastructure, public services, and rural governance, making it a focal point of security and political concern in southern Afghanistan.

=== Today (2021–) ===
In 2021, as the United states withdrew from Afghanistan, a Taliban offensive advanced across the country, including Kandahar and other southern provinces. On May 1, 2021, the U.S. completed its withdrawal from Kandahar, enabling the Taliban to capture surrounding districts and encircle the city. The ensuing conflict displaced approximately 150,000 residents in the province. Kandahar city fell to the Taliban on August 12, 2021, establishing their de facto control over the province. Since their return to power, the Taliban have implemented restrictions affecting education, employment, and public life, including bans on women and girls from participating in multiple institutions. In 2023, the provincial office of the Taliban's spokesman was relocated from Kabul to Kandahar, further consolidating the role of the region as a regional administrative and political center. The city maintains its symbolic status as the Pashtun heartland and a historic nexus of Afghan governance, commerce, and tribal authority.

== Geography ==
=== Landscape ===
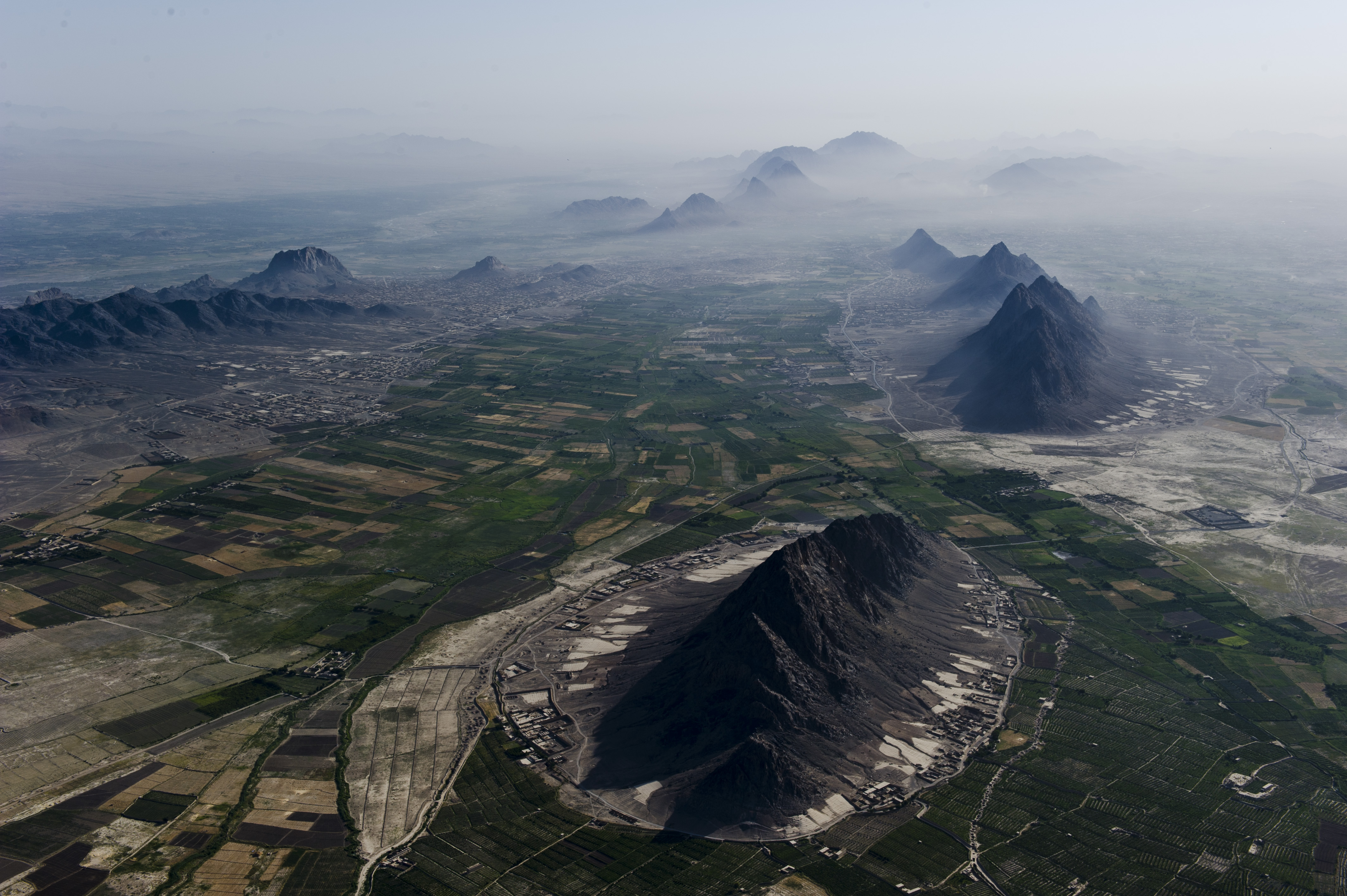
The Arghandab Valley between Kandahar and Lashkar Gah

Kandahar is situated in southern Afghanistan and shares borders with Helmand to the west, Zabul to the east, Uruzgan to the north, and Pakistan to the south. The province's terrain is diverse, comprising arid plains, fertile river valleys, and rugged hills. The Arghandab River valley is the most fertile part of the province and serves as the center of agricultural production. Extensive irrigation projects, such as the Dahla Dam, help channel water from the Arghandab and Helmand rivers to surrounding farmland.

The western and southern parts of the province consist of semi-desert plains, characterized by sparse vegetation and sandy soils, which are suitable for grazing but less productive for intensive agriculture. To the north and east, low-lying hills and rocky outcrops dominate, creating natural barriers between districts. These hills also contain mineral deposits such as gravel, clay, and marble, which support small-scale mining operations. Kandahar city itself is located on relatively flat terrain in the Arghandab valley, making it a natural hub for trade and transportation.

=== Flora and fauna ===
Kandahar's flora is adapted to its mostly arid and semi-arid environment. Irrigated areas along the Arghandab River and around the Dahla Dam support orchards, gardens, and agricultural fields, where crops such as pomegranates, grapes, almonds, wheat, and various vegetables thrive. The dry plains and hills are covered with hardy shrubs, grasses, and scattered acacia and tamarisk trees. The wildlife reflects its diverse habitats. Common mammals include foxes, jackals, wild goats, and hares, while bird species such as partridges, doves, and migratory waterfowl inhabit river valleys and seasonal wetlands. Rivers and small irrigation channels also support fish and amphibians in localized areas, though these populations are limited due to low water availability and seasonal fluctuations.

=== Climate ===
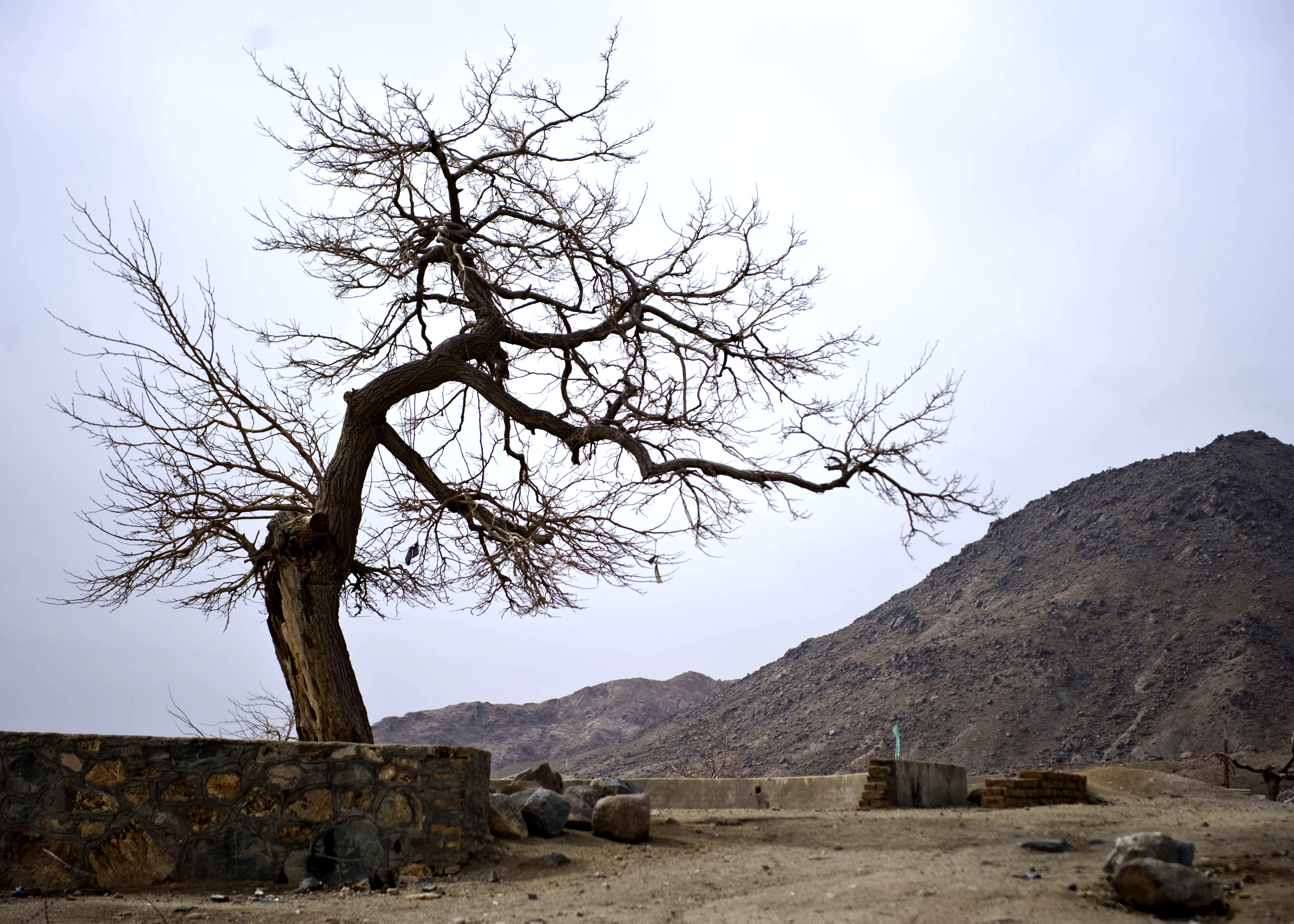
Kandahar typically experiences hot summers

Kandahar has a predominantly arid climate with long, hot summers and mild winters. Average summer temperatures often exceed 40 °C in the plains, while winter temperatures can drop to near freezing at night. Rainfall is scarce, mostly occurring during the winter and spring months, averaging less than 200 mm annually, which makes irrigation essential for agriculture. Wind patterns can cause dust storms, particularly during late spring and early summer, which occasionally disrupt daily life and reduce air quality. The Arghandab River valley and other irrigated areas benefit from slightly more moderate microclimates, allowing for the successful cultivation of high-value crops such as pomegranates, grapes, and melons. Seasonal variations also affect water availability, with spring snowmelt from surrounding hills providing temporary increases in river flow.

== Government and politics ==
=== Local governance ===
Kandahar's governance has historically been shaped by the interplay of tribal authority, central administration, and strategic geography. In the 19th and early 20th centuries, the province was governed through a mixture of tribal elders, local khans, and representatives of the Afghan monarchy, who exercised significant autonomy while recognizing formal sovereignty from Kabul. Early efforts by the Afghan state to consolidate power included the appointment of provincial governors and the establishment of administrative offices in Kandahar, aimed at centralizing decision-making and improving public services.

During periods of conflict from 1979 onwards—including the Soviet–Afghan War, the civil wars, and the Taliban's first regime—formal governance structures were frequently replaced or supplemented by local warlords and tribal leaders, who controlled security, taxation, and dispute resolution. After the U.S.-led invasion in 2001, provincial governance was restored through appointed officials, while traditional councils and community elders continued to exert influence over social and judicial matters, particularly in rural areas.

Since the Taliban regained control in 2021, the provincial administration operates under the framework of the Islamic Emirate of Afghanistan. Governors and district officials are directly appointed by the central Taliban authorities, and formal political parties no longer participate in provincial governance. Nevertheless, tribal networks, religious leaders, and local councils continue to play a role in mediating disputes and influencing decisions at the community level.

As of December 2025, the governor of Kandahar is Mullah Shirin Akhund.

=== Administrative divisions ===
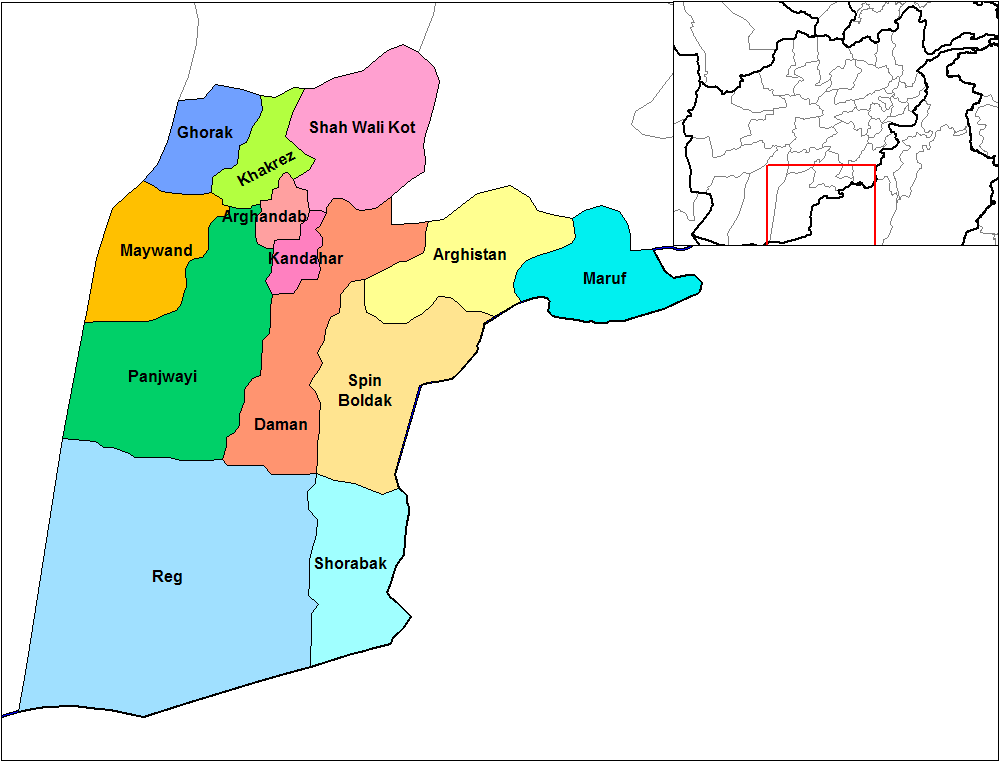
Map of the districts of Kandahar as of January 2004, prior to the redrawing of provincial and district boundaries later that year

With the exception of a few districts, the district borders of Kandahar have been largely unchanged since 1914. The province is divided into 18 districts, each managed by a district head responsible for local administration and coordination with the provincial government. The provincial capital, Kandahar, serves as the administrative, economic, and logistical hub for southern Afghanistan. Other key settlements include Arghandab, Panjwayi, Daman, Spin Boldak, and Shah Wali Kot. District centers are typically located along major roads, river valleys, or population clusters, reflecting both geographic accessibility and demographic patterns. Local administrations are tasked with civil registration, maintenance of basic law and order, and oversight of services such as education, healthcare, and infrastructure development.

Districts of Kandahar Province
District	Capital	Population	Area in km^{2}	Pop. density	Number of villages and ethnic groups
Arghandab		70,016	606	116	79 villages. Pashtun
Arghistan		38,928	3,728	10	Pashtun
Daman		39,193	4,179	9	Pashtun.
Ghorak		10,895	1,742	6	Pashtun
Kandahar	Kandahar	632,601	114	5,539	Predominantly Pashtun, few Baloch, Tajik, Hazara, Uzbek.
Khakrez		25,774	1,738	15	Pashtun
Maruf		37,333	3,335	11	Pashtun
Maiwand		66,297	2,963	22	160 villages. 95% Pashtun and 5% other.
Miyanishin		17,006	803	21	Pashtun. Used to be part of Shah Wali Kot District.
Nesh		15,146	1,110	14	Pashtun. Used to belong to Uruzgan Province.
Panjwayi		98,448	5,841	17	Pashtun
Reg		10,097	13,470	1	Baloch and Pashtun
Shah Wali Kot		49,025	3,345	15	Pashtun
Shorabak		13,020	4,153	3	Pashtun and Baloch
Spin Boldak		113,727	2,963	38	Pashtun
Takhta-pul		14,349	2,926	5	Pashtun
Zhari		96,987	745,1	130	Pashtun. Created out of Maiwand and Panjwayi District.
Dand		50,752	617	82	Pashtun
Kandahar		1,399,594	54,845	26	98.7% Pashtuns, 0.9% Balochi, 0.1% Tajiks, 0.1% Hazaras, 0.1% Uzbeks, 0.2% others. (Note: Note: "Predominantely" or "dominated" is interpreted as 99%, "majority" as 70%, "mixed" as 1/(number of ethnicities), "minority" as 30% and "few" or "some" as 1%.)

=== Security ===
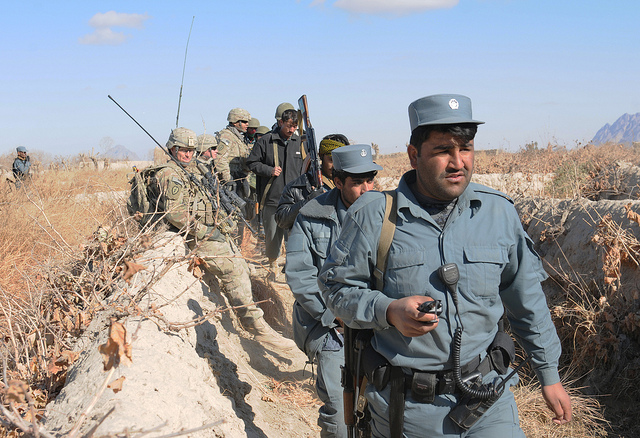
Afghan National Security Forces in southern Kandahar (2012)

The province's security landscape has long been influenced by its strategic location and porous border with Pakistan. During the Islamic Republic era, the province was a central venue of counterinsurgency operations against the Taliban, hosting international military forces and Afghan National Security personnel. Since 2021, the Taliban maintain primary control over provincial security, with the city of Kandahar experiencing a comparatively stable environment, while rural districts remain vulnerable to localized unrest, criminal networks, and sporadic militant activity. The continued influence of tribal structures and local power brokers further shapes the implementation of law and order throughout the province.

== Economy ==
The economy of Kandahar is predominantly based on agriculture, regional trade, and transport-related services. A large share of the population depends directly or indirectly on farming, livestock breeding, market trade, and cross-border commerce with Pakistan. Since 2021, public employment and international aid-related income have declined sharply, increasing reliance on subsistence agriculture, informal labor, and remittances.

=== Agriculture and animal husbandry ===
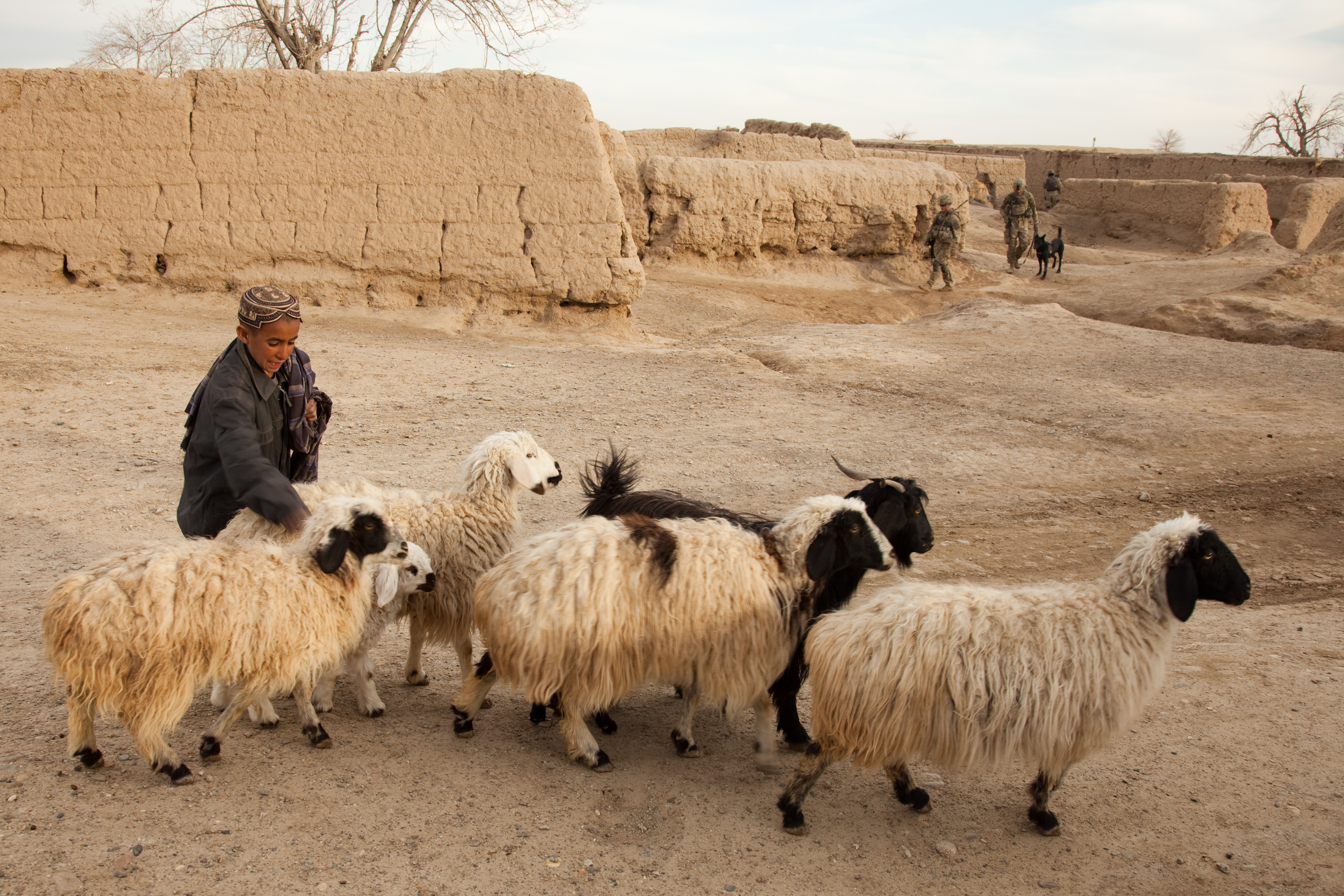
A child herds sheep through a street in Maiwand (2012)

Agriculture remains the primary economic sector of Kandahar. The fertile lands of the Arghandab River valley support the cultivation of wheat, pomegranates, grapes, melons, vegetables, and fodder crops. The province is internationally known for its high-quality pomegranate production, which remains a key export commodity. Since the Taliban return to power in 2021, opium poppy cultivation has been largely suppressed through strict enforcement, significantly altering rural income structures and forcing farmers to return to legal crops. Animal husbandry plays a complementary role, with the breeding of sheep, goats, cattle, and poultry providing meat, dairy products, wool, and hides for both local consumption and trade.

=== Mining and industry ===
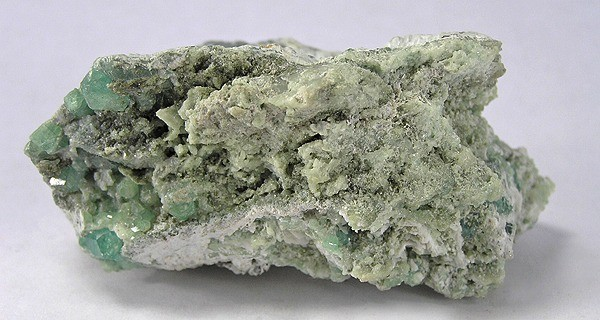
Andradite from Kandahar

Kandahar possesses limited large-scale industrial capacity, with mining activity concentrated primarily on construction materials. The province hosts licensed extraction of gravel, river gravel, crushed stone, marble, sand, clay, and minor fluorite deposits, which are used almost entirely for local and regional construction markets. Marble extraction exists on a small scale and is processed mainly for domestic use rather than export.

Industrial activity is dominated by small-scale manufacturing and processing, including food processing, brick and concrete production, carpet weaving, leatherwork, metal workshops, and stone crushing plants. Most industrial output remains artisanal or semi-mechanized, constrained by weak infrastructure, limited access to capital, fuel shortages, and unstable electricity supply. As a result, Kandahar's industrial sector continues to serve primarily local consumption and basic construction demand, rather than functioning as a major export-oriented industrial region.

=== Trade ===
Trade is one of the most important economic functions of the province due to its location near the border to Pakistan. The Spin Boldak–Chaman crossing serves as a major commercial gateway for imports and exports, facilitating the movement of food, fuel, construction materials, textiles, and consumer goods. Kandahar acts as a distribution hub for southern Afghanistan, linking domestic markets with South Asian supply routes. Informal cross-border trade remains widespread alongside official customs operations.

=== Energy and irrigation ===
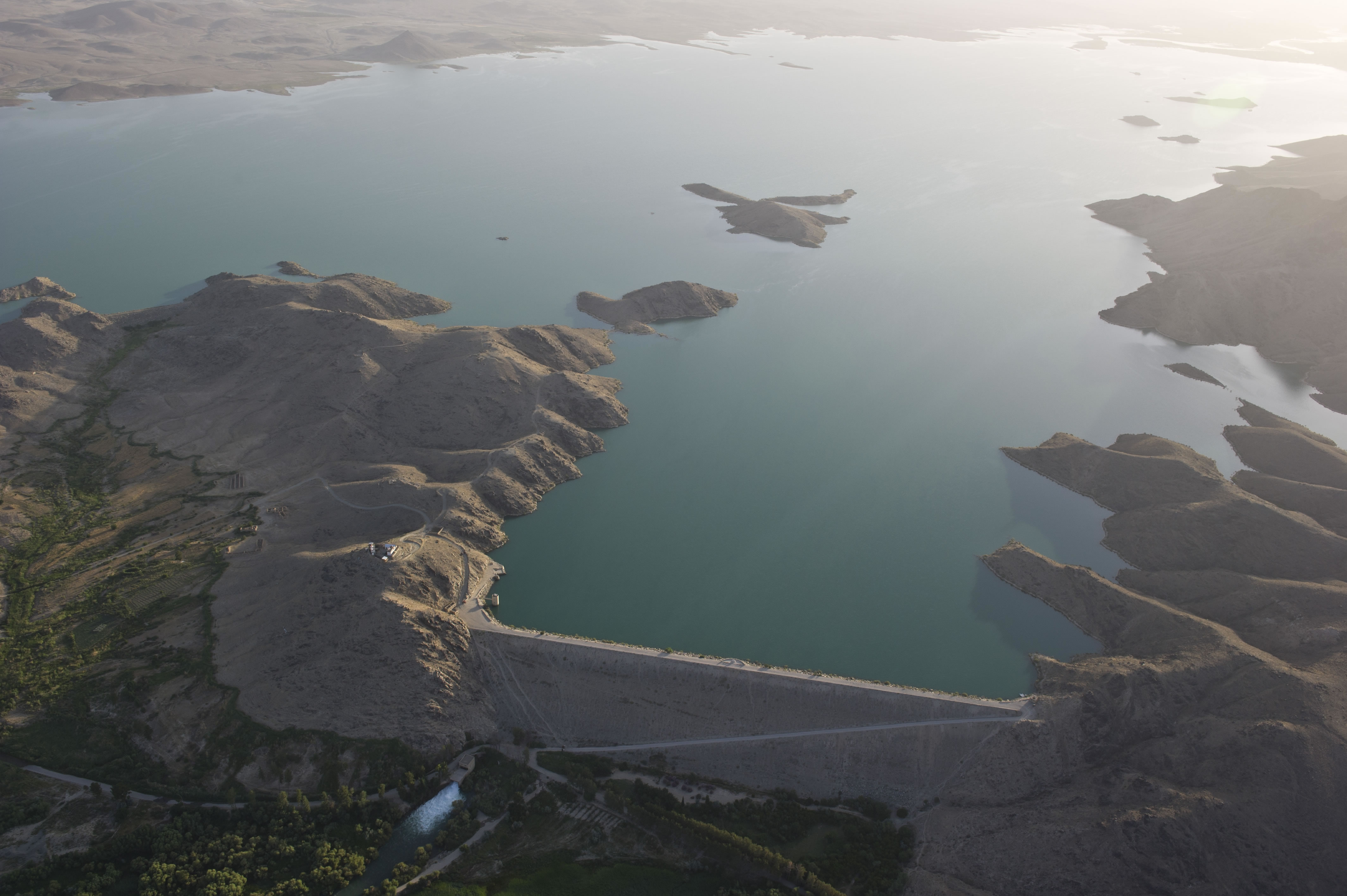
The Dahla Dam in Kandahar

Energy supply in Kandahar is limited and unreliable, relying on a mix of imported electricity, diesel generators, and small-scale solar installations. Rural areas remain especially underserved. Irrigation is critical to the agricultural economy and depends primarily on the Arghandab River system, traditional karez underground canals, and seasonal water flows. Several districts benefit from irrigation provided by infrastructure developed and managed by the Helmand and Arghandab Valley Authority. The Dahla Dam, located north of the city of Kandahar, supplies additional water resources to the province. There are approximately 700 greenhouses in the province. Aging infrastructure, drought cycles, and insufficient maintenance continue to constrain agricultural productivity.

=== Tourism ===
Kandahar's tourism is centered on its historical, cultural, and religious sites, including the mausoleum of Ahmad Shah Durrani and the Shrine of the Cloak of the Prophet Muhammad. Decades of conflict limited both domestic and international visitation. Since 2021, relative stabilization under the Taliban has allowed a revival of local tourism and a limited number of foreign visitors. Tourism remains restricted in scale, with facilities and infrastructure underdeveloped, and international travel constrained by security and political conditions.

=== Communication ===
Telecommunications infrastructure expanded rapidly after 2001, with mobile phone networks and limited internet services reaching most urban areas. Since 2021, communication services continue to function, though under tighter regulation. Internet penetration remains low, especially in rural districts, and access is affected by electricity shortages and economic constraints.

=== Transportation and infrastructure ===
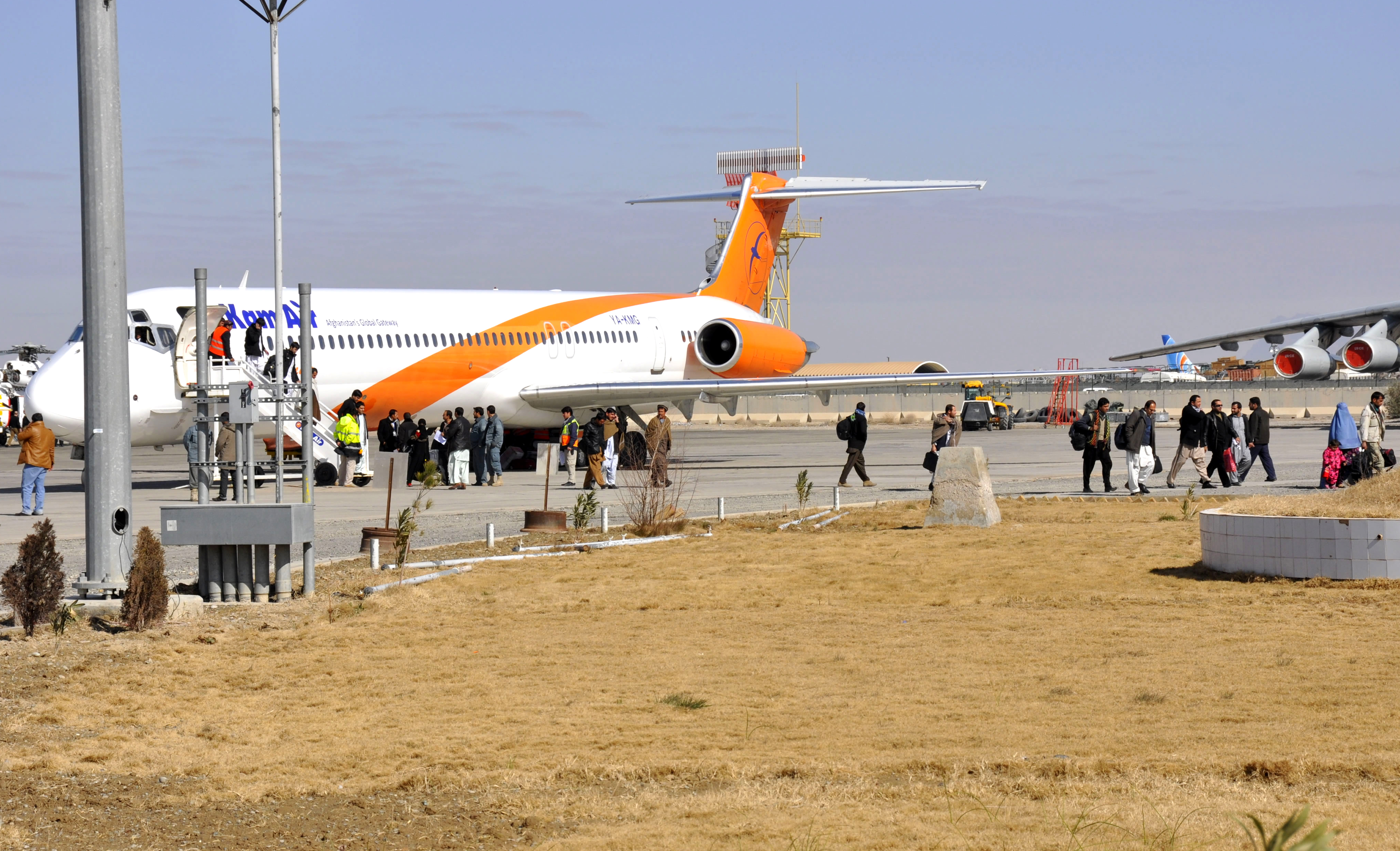
A Kam Air passenger plane at Kandahar International Airport in 2012

Kandahar remains a major transportation hub in Afghanistan. The Ahmad Shah Baba International Airport, located east of the city of Kandahar, serves both civilian and military flights, providing domestic connections and limited international services to the United Arab Emirates, Iran, and other regional countries. Although there is currently no operational railway, plans have been proposed for a line connecting Kandahar to Spin Boldak and onward to Chaman and the Pakistan Railways.

Ground transport relies mainly on trucks and cars, with Spin Boldak serving as a key hub for trade with Pakistan. Bus services connect major towns and village centers, while the capital city formerly had a city bus system and continues to operate taxicabs. The province is linked by major highways to Herat, Kabul, and Quetta in Pakistan, with several key roads paved with support from the United Arab Emirates. Despite these improvements, many secondary and rural routes remain unpaved or in poor condition, limiting access for agricultural and commercial transport.

== Demographics ==
=== Population ===
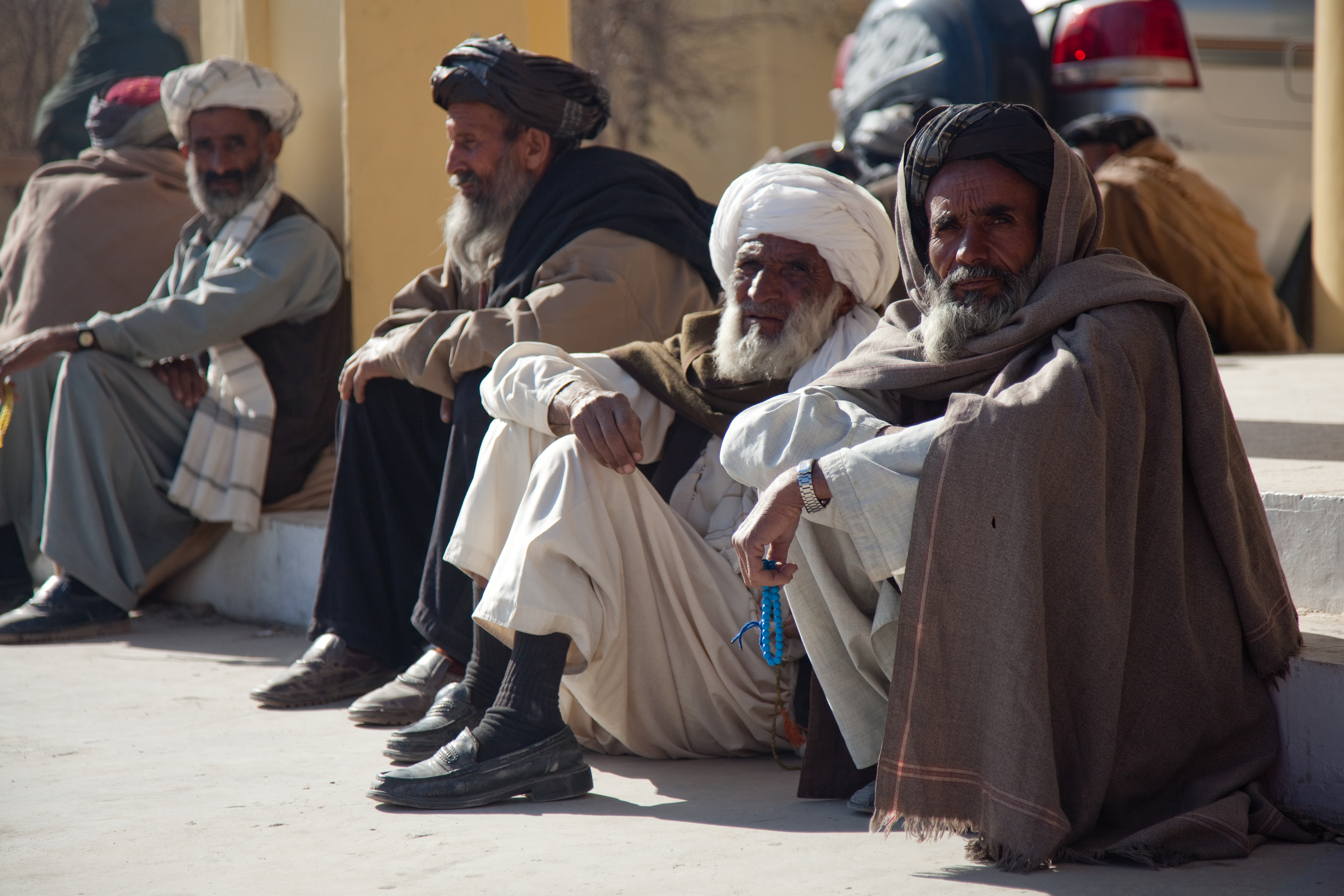
Local men sitting outside of a forward operating base in Pasab, Kandahar

Kandahar province has an estimated population of approximately 1.5 million people as of 2023, spread across urban centers, towns, and rural villages. The provincial capital, Kandahar, hosts by far the largest share of urban residents, followed by Spin Boldak, while the majority of the population lives in rural districts. Poverty and limited infrastructure continue to affect living conditions, particularly in remote districts, with a multidimensional poverty index of 0.428 and 48.4% of the population living in severe poverty as of 2023. Many households rely on subsistence agriculture, animal husbandry, informal labor, or remittances, reflecting the province's economic challenges.

=== Ethnicity, languages, and religion ===
As with much of Afghanistan, ethnic, linguistic, and religious identities in Kandahar are fluid and overlapping. The province is overwhelmingly Pashtun, with one major tribal confederation being the Durrani, specifically the Zirak (like Barakzai, Achakzai, and Alokozai) and Panjpai (like Noorzai), and the other confederation being the Ghilzai (e.g. Tokhi and Hotak). The Baloch and Brahui are concentrated in southern districts, while smaller populations of Hazara and Tajik/Farsiwan reside mainly in urban areas. Pashto serves as the main lingua franca, while Dari is spoken by minorities and for administrative or formal purposes. Many residents are bilingual or multilingual, reflecting historical trade and cultural exchange. The population is predominantly Sunni Muslim, with small Shia minorities among Hazaras and Farsiwan and small Hindu and Sikh communities in the cities. Tribal affiliations remain important in politics, business, and social life, with intermarriage and overlapping identities blurring strict ethnic or religious boundaries.

Estimated ethnolinguistic and -religious composition
Ethnicity	Pashtun	Others	Sources
Period	Pashtun	Others	Sources

2004–2021 (Islamic Republic)	≥98%	∅
2020 EU	1st	–
2018 UN	overwhelming majority (Note: excl. Kochi.)	∅ (Note: incl. Hazara and Hindu.)
2017 CSSF (Note: Demographic information is based on data from 2017.)	majority	∅ (Note: incl. Tajik/Farsiwan, Baloch, and Hazara.)
2015 CP	98%	∅ (Note: incl. Farsiwan and Baloch.)
2015 NPS	majority (Note: excl. Kochi.)	∅
2011 PRT	>98%	∅
2011 USA	98%	–
2009 ISW	98%	∅ (Note: incl. Baloch, Hazara, and Tajik.)

Legend:
- ∅: Ethnicity mentioned in source but not quantified
- –: Ethnicity not mentioned specifically
- Source abbreviations: Empirical sources: –, Government sources: CP – Colombo Plan, EU – European Union Agency for Asylum, PRT – Provincial Reconstruction Team of the United States government, UN – United Nations Assistance Mission in Afghanistan, Editorial sources: CSSF – Center for the Scientific Study of Families, ISW – Institute for the Study of War, NPS – Naval Postgraduate School, USA – United States Army

=== Education ===
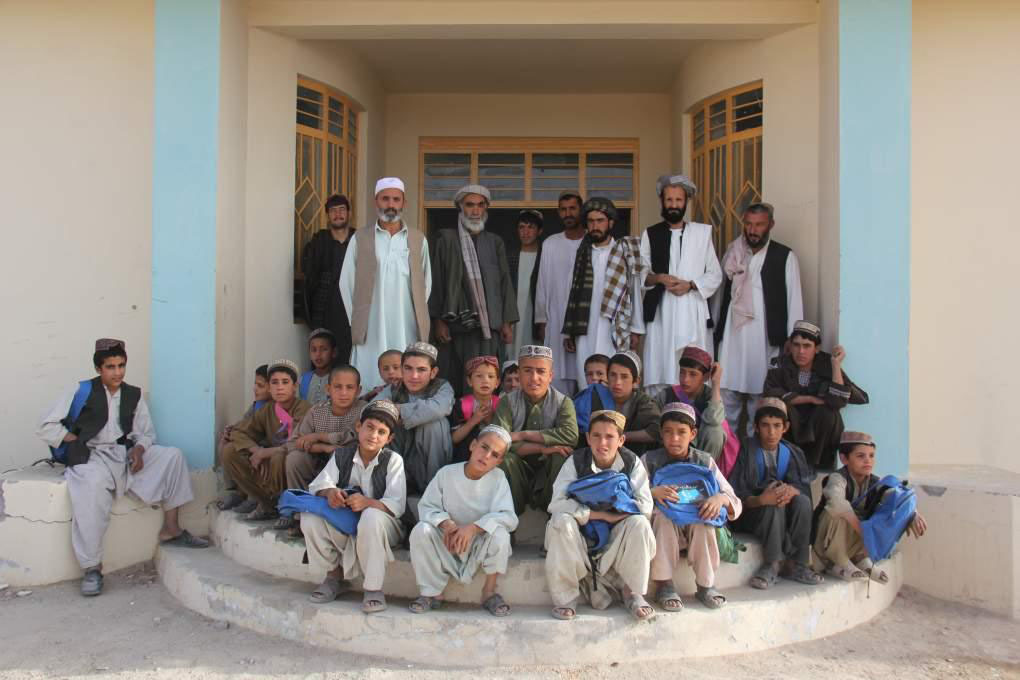
Students of a boys school in Kandahar (2011)

Education access varies widely across the province. As of 2015, Kandahar had over 200 educational institutions, including primary and secondary schools concentrated in urban areas. Kandahar University is the largest educational institution in the province with over 5,000 students as of 2012. Rural districts face significant shortages of schools, teachers, and learning materials. Literacy rates are low, with an overall rate of approximately 13%, and female literacy remains particularly limited. Vocational training and NGO-supported programs provide skills development in rural areas. Since 2021, the Taliban administration has expanded madrasas, but female access to secondary and higher education is restricted.

=== Health ===
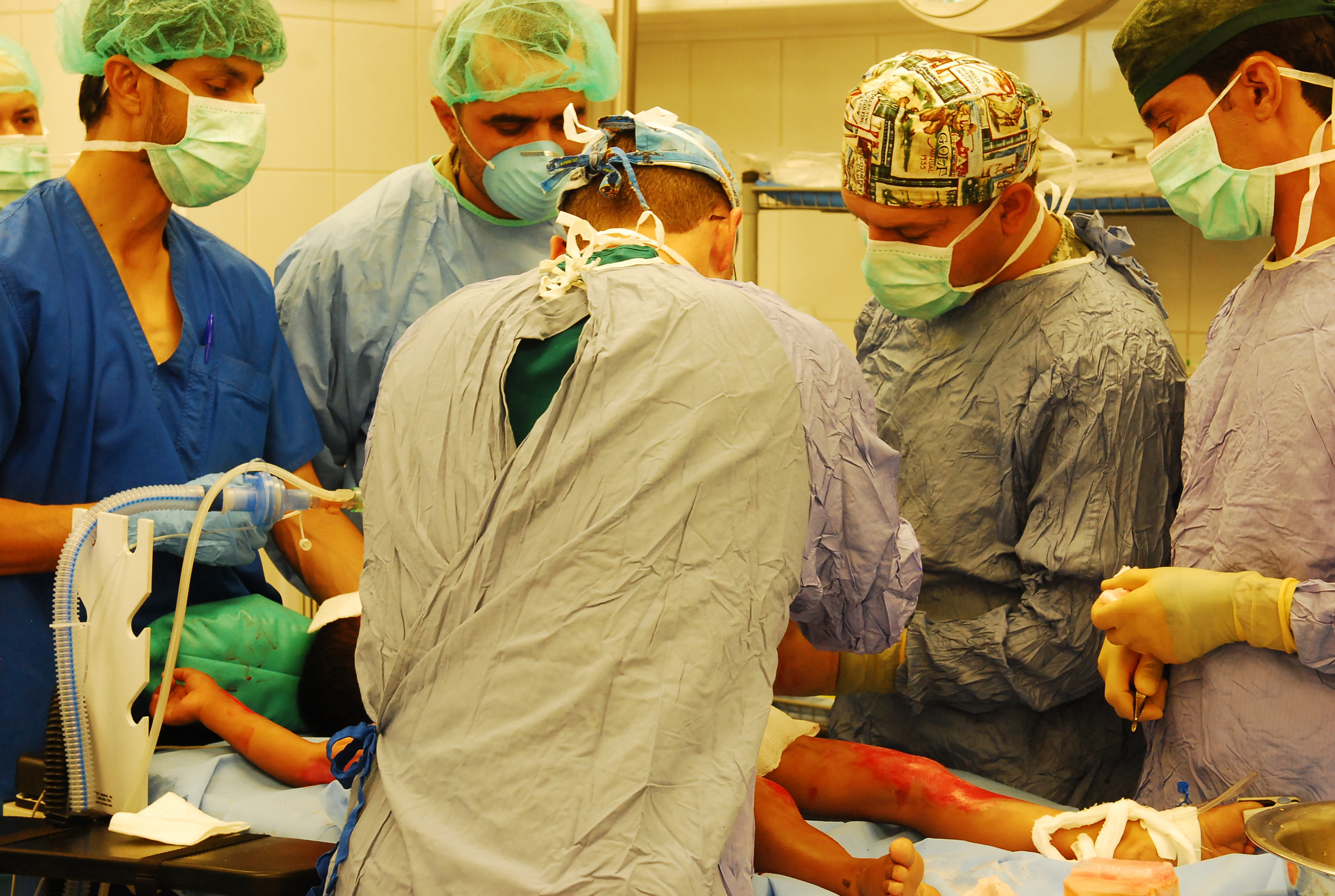
Doctors treating an injured patient at the Kandahar Regional Military Hospital (2010)

There are a number of hospitals in the province, most of them in the city of Kandahar. These include Aino Mina Hospital, Al Farhad Hospital, Ayoubi Hospital, Mirwais Hospital, Mohmand Hospital, Sial Curative Hospital and Sidal Hospital.

Healthcare infrastructure is concentrated in the city of Kandahar, with 133 hospitals, 86 clinics, and 730 pharmacies providing primary and specialized care. People in rural areas often must travel long distances to reach medical facilities. Common health challenges include maternal and infant mortality; malnutrition; and limited access to clean water and sanitation. Non-governmental organizations such as Médecins Sans Frontières and the Islamic Relief Organization supplement government health services, offering vaccinations, basic medical care, and health education.

== Culture ==
=== Music and dances ===
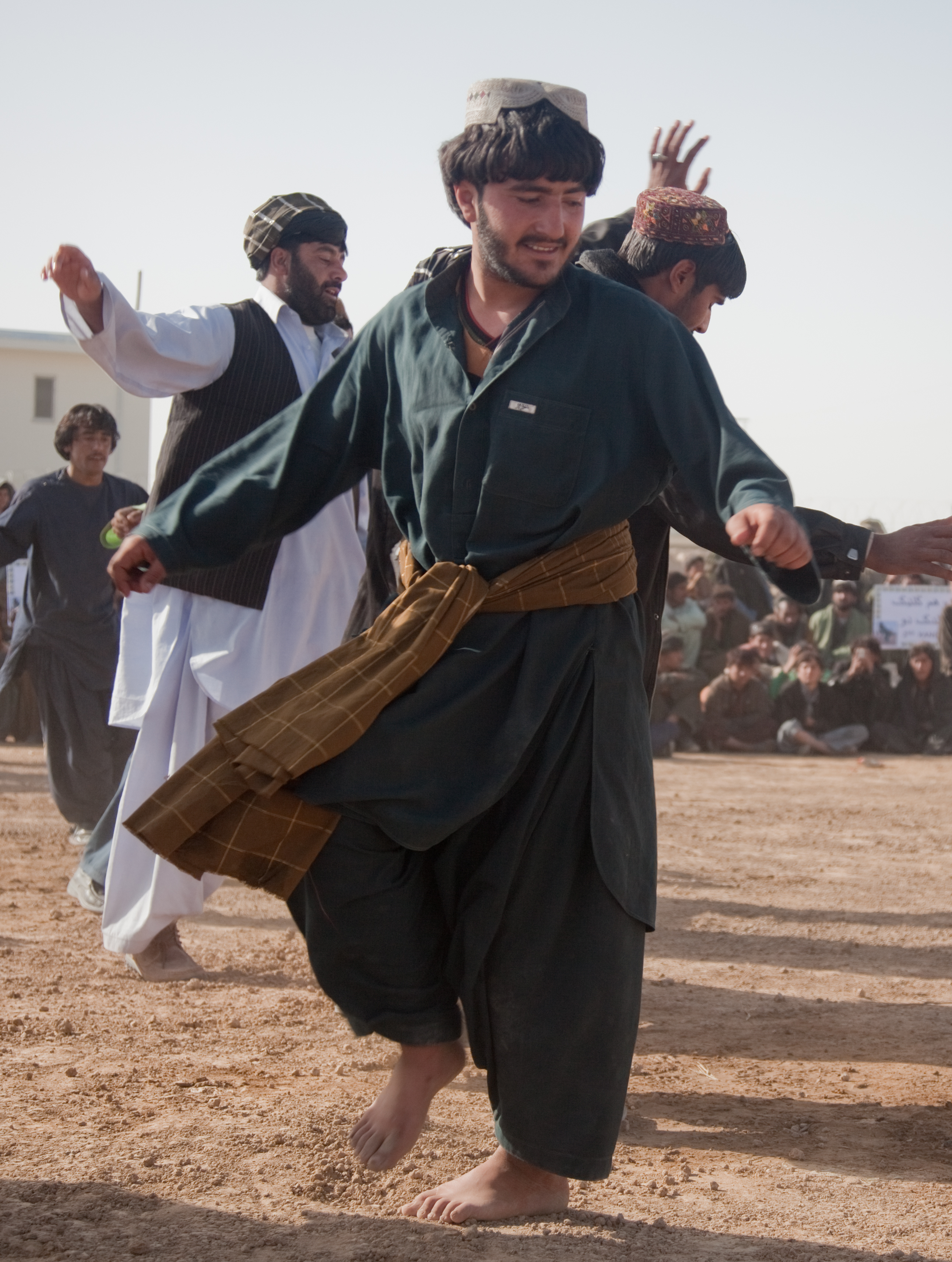
Kandahari men performing the national dance of attan

Kandahar has a rich musical and dance heritage deeply rooted in Pashtun tribal traditions. The attan, a circular group dance, is considered the most iconic cultural expression, performed at weddings, religious festivals, and communal celebrations to symbolize unity and local identity. Music often features traditional instruments such as the rubab, tabla, and sitar, accompanying both festive and ceremonial occasions. Folk songs recount historical events, tribal legends, and heroic deeds, preserving the oral traditions of the region. Religious chants and recitations of the Quran are also central to cultural life, particularly during Ramadan and other Islamic observances. Singers from Kandahar such as Naghma contribute to the modern Afghan music landscape.

=== Dresses and attire ===
Traditional clothing varies across tribal groups but remains a central part of Kandahari identity. Men typically wear perahan o tunban, often paired with turbans, embroidered caps, or sashes to indicate tribal affiliation. Women wear long, colorful dresses with intricate embroidery, complemented by scarves or veils. For special occasions such as weddings, festivals, or religious celebrations, garments feature elaborate patterns, metallic threads, and decorative jewelry, reflecting both social status and regional craftsmanship. Tribal elders and leaders often wear distinct clothing that signals their authority and heritage.

=== Cuisine ===
Kandahar's cuisine is closely tied to its agricultural wealth, particularly its pomegranates, grapes, and melons, which are widely used in both meals and sweets. The province is known for kababs, especially lamb and chicken, often served with rice dishes such as qabeli palaw. Seasonal vegetables like carrots, spinach, and cauliflower are common, alongside dairy products such as yogurt and qurut. Traditional sweets are often accompanied by green tea, which is served throughout the day during family gatherings and communal events.

=== Architecture, art, and literature ===
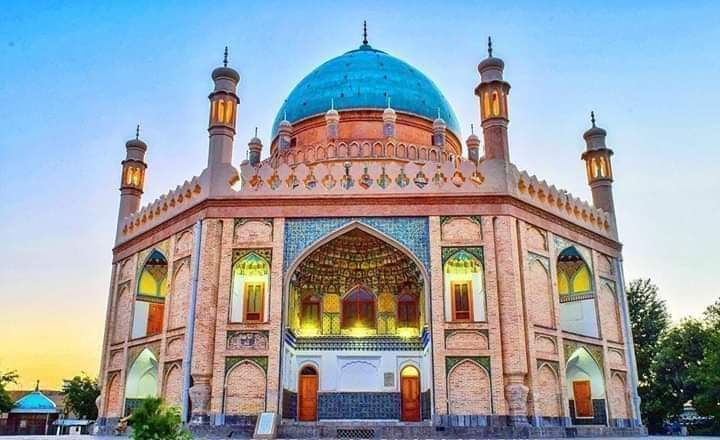
Mausoleum of Ahmad Shah Durrani in 2021

Kandahar features historic Islamic architecture, including mosques, shrines, and traditional courtyard homes. Notable sites include the Mausoleum of Ahmad Shah Durrani and the Shrine of the Cloak of the Prophet Muhammad, which attract pilgrims from across the country. Kandahari art includes calligraphy, carpet weaving, embroidery, and woodwork, reflecting millennia of local craftsmanship. Poetry and storytelling remain highly valued, often performed during social gatherings or religious events, preserving tribal histories, moral lessons, and heroic tales.

=== Media, entertainment, and festivities ===
Radio is the main source of information in rural areas, with stations such as Radio Kandahar, BBC Pashto, and Radio Azadi broadcasting news and cultural programming. Television and social media are more accessible in the city of Kandahar, providing entertainment and global news. Traditional festivities include Eid al-Fitr, Eid al-Adha, Nowruz, and weddings, which feature music, dance, and communal meals. Since 2021, Taliban restrictions have limited music events and public performances, changing the way cultural celebrations are conducted, though private family gatherings continue to uphold traditions.

=== Places of interest ===
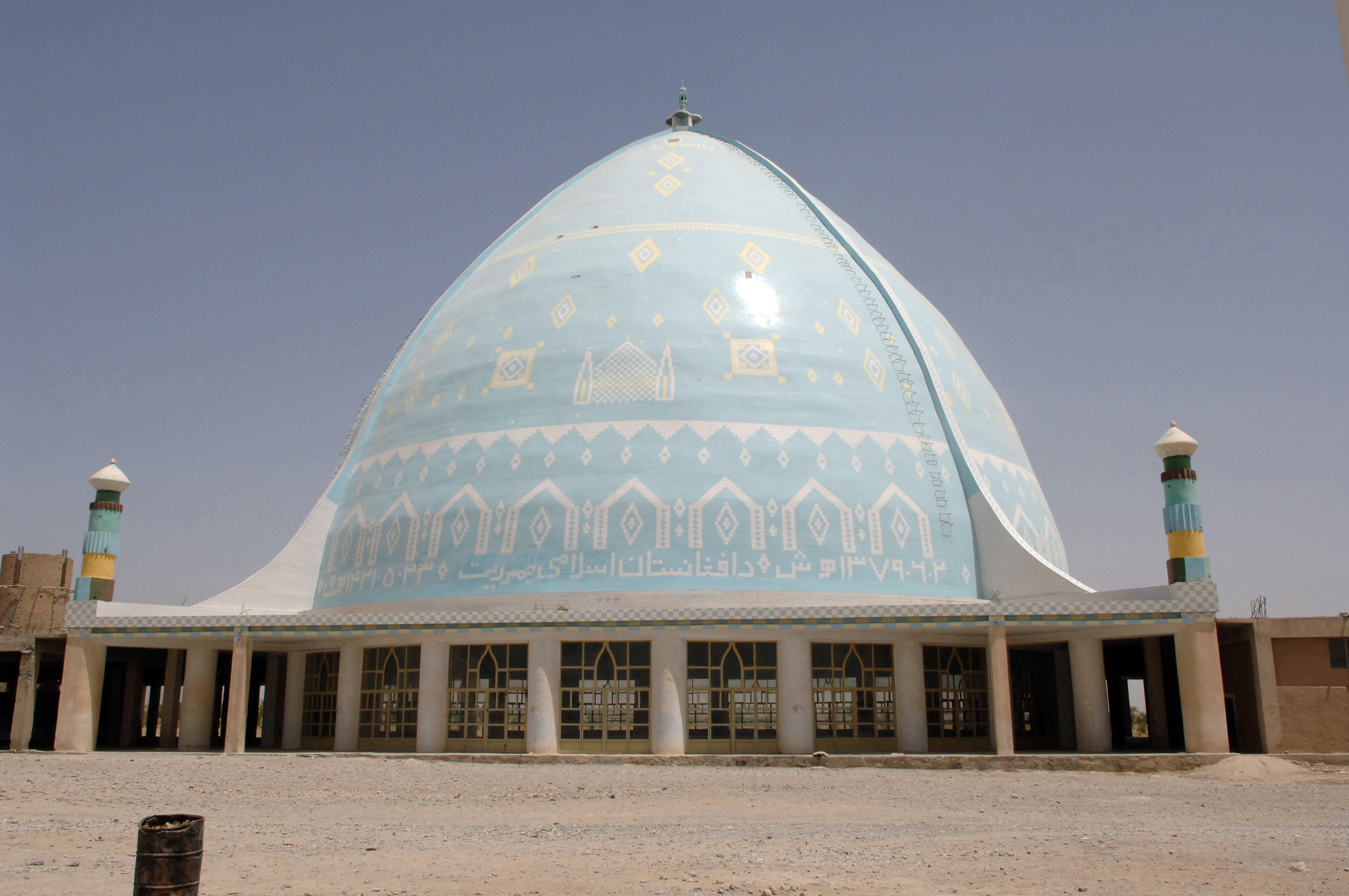
Front view of the Kandahar University Mosque

Kandahar is home to numerous religious, historical, and cultural landmarks, reflecting its long-standing role as a political and spiritual center of Afghanistan. The most iconic site is the Shrine of the Cloak of the Prophet Muhammad, one of the most sacred places in the country. The mausoleums of Ahmad Shah Durrani and Mirwais Hotak, founders of modern Afghanistan, are other major national monuments located in the city. Kandahar also features historic and modern mosques, old city quarters, and archaeological remains linked to ancient trade routes. Beyond urban landmarks, the province is characterized by its fertile river valleys, gardens, and orchards, especially along the Arghandab River. The Dahla Dam and the Arghandab canal network hold both economic and cultural importance, as they sustain traditional irrigation systems that have shaped agriculture, settlement patterns, and livelihoods for generations.

=== Sports ===
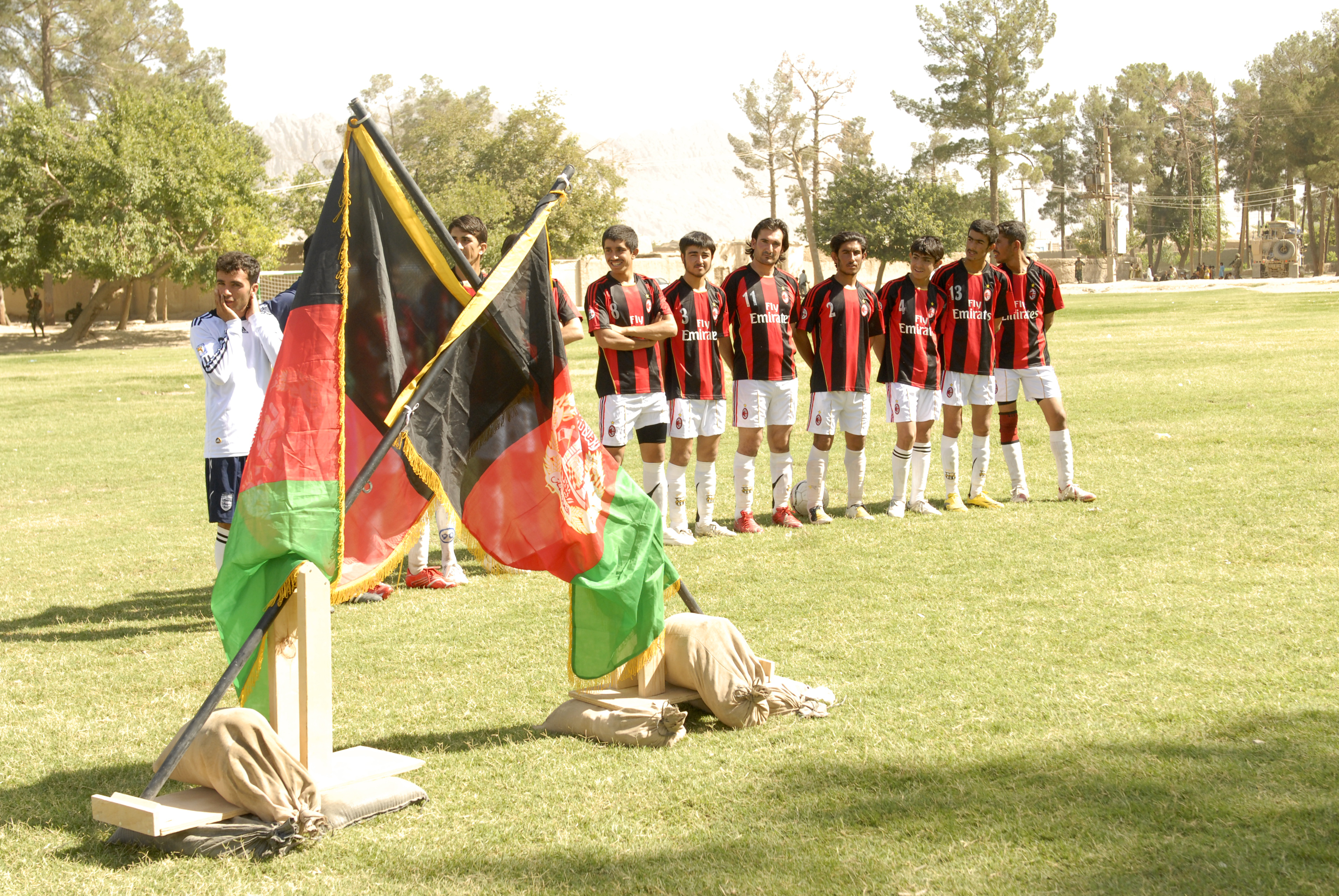
Amateur football players in Kandahar (2011)

Historically, the most prominent traditional sport in Kandahar has been buzkashi, an ancient equestrian game similar to polo. It has long been associated with tribal prestige, strength, and horsemanship, and remains culturally significant, particularly in rural districts. Other traditional activities have included koshti wrestling, archery, and physically demanding folk games practiced during festivals and community gatherings.

In the modern era, cricket has become the most popular sport in Kandahar, especially among younger generations, influenced by Afghanistan's international success. In national cricket competitions such as the Shpageeza Cricket League, Kandahar is represented by the Boost Defenders franchise, which covers the southern provinces, playing its home matches at the Kandahar International Cricket Stadium. Football is also widely played due to its low equipment requirements and long-standing presence in schools and local clubs. During the period of the Islamic Republic, Kandahar was represented in national football competitions through De Maiwand Atalan FC, which served as the regional team for Kandahar together with Helmand, Urozgan, Nimruz and Zabul in the Afghan Premier League. In the successor competition, the Afghanistan Champions League, Kandahar is represented through Aino Mina FC. In addition, combat sports such as boxing and taekwondo, along with fitness and bodybuilding, are practiced in private gyms, mainly in Kandahar.

== Notable people ==
=== Historical figures ===
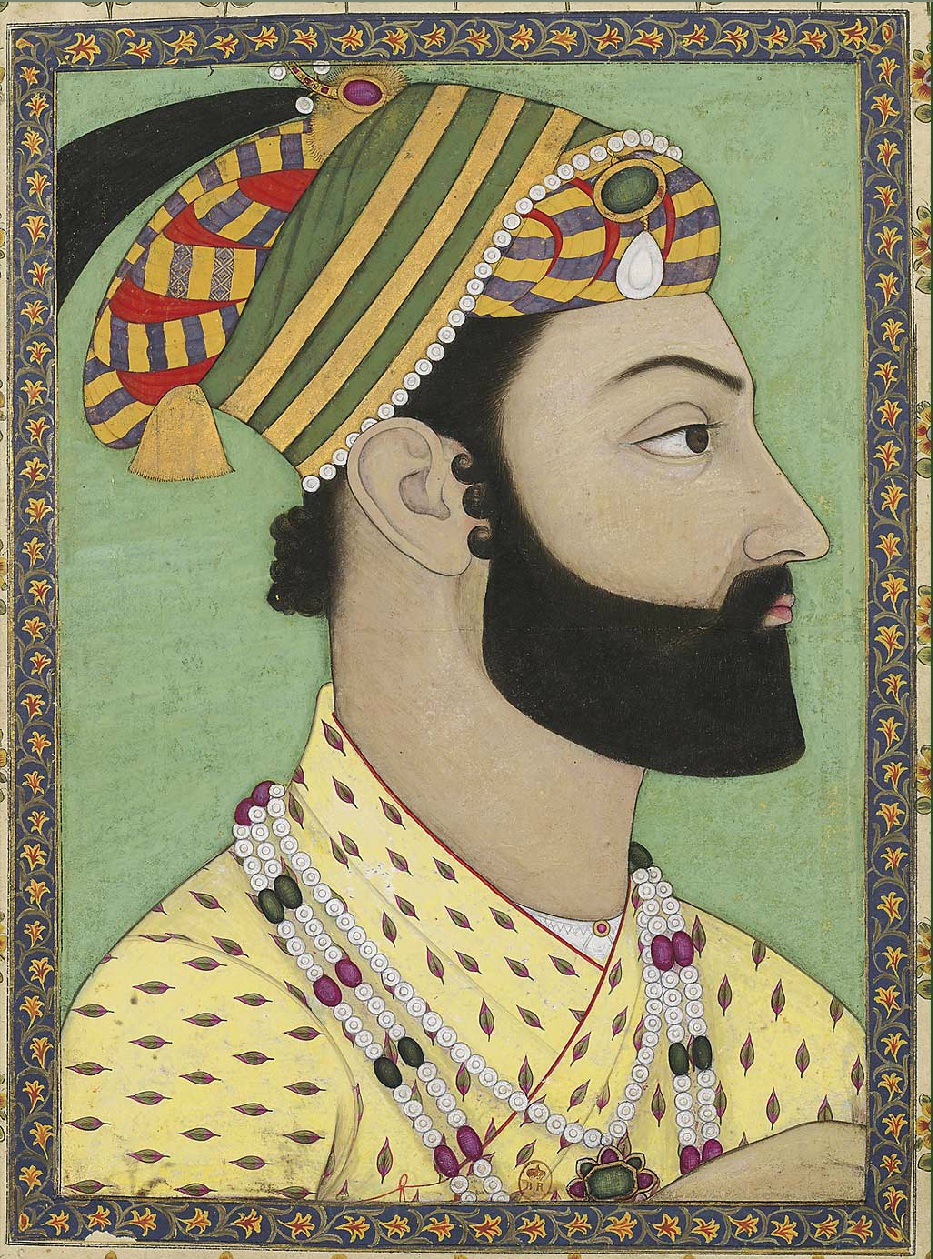
Ahmad Shah Durrani is considered to be the founding father of modern Afghanistan

- Kandahari Begum, first wife of 17th-century Mughal Emperor Shah Jahan
- Ahmad Shah Durrani, 18th-century founder and Shah of the Durrani Empire
- Timur Shah Durrani, 18th-century Shah of the Durrani Empire
- Zaman Shah Durrani, 18th-/19th-century Shah of the Durrani Empire
- Abdul Aziz Hotak, 18th-century Emir of Afghanistan
- Ashraf Hotak, 18th-century Shah of Iran
- Hussain Hotak, 18th-century Emir of Afghanistan
- Mahmud Hotak, 18th-century Emir of Afghanistan
- Mirwais Hotak, 18th-century Emir of Afghanistan and founder of the Hotak dynasty
- Nur Jahan, 20th wife of 17th-century Mughal Emperor Jahangir
- Dost Mohammad Khan, 19th-century Emir of Afghanistan
- Hajji Jamal Khan, 18th-century grand vizier of the Durrani Empire
- Mozaffar-Hosayn Mirza, 16th-century governor of Kandahar
- Rustam Mirza Safavi, 16th-/17th-century administrator

=== Modern figures ===
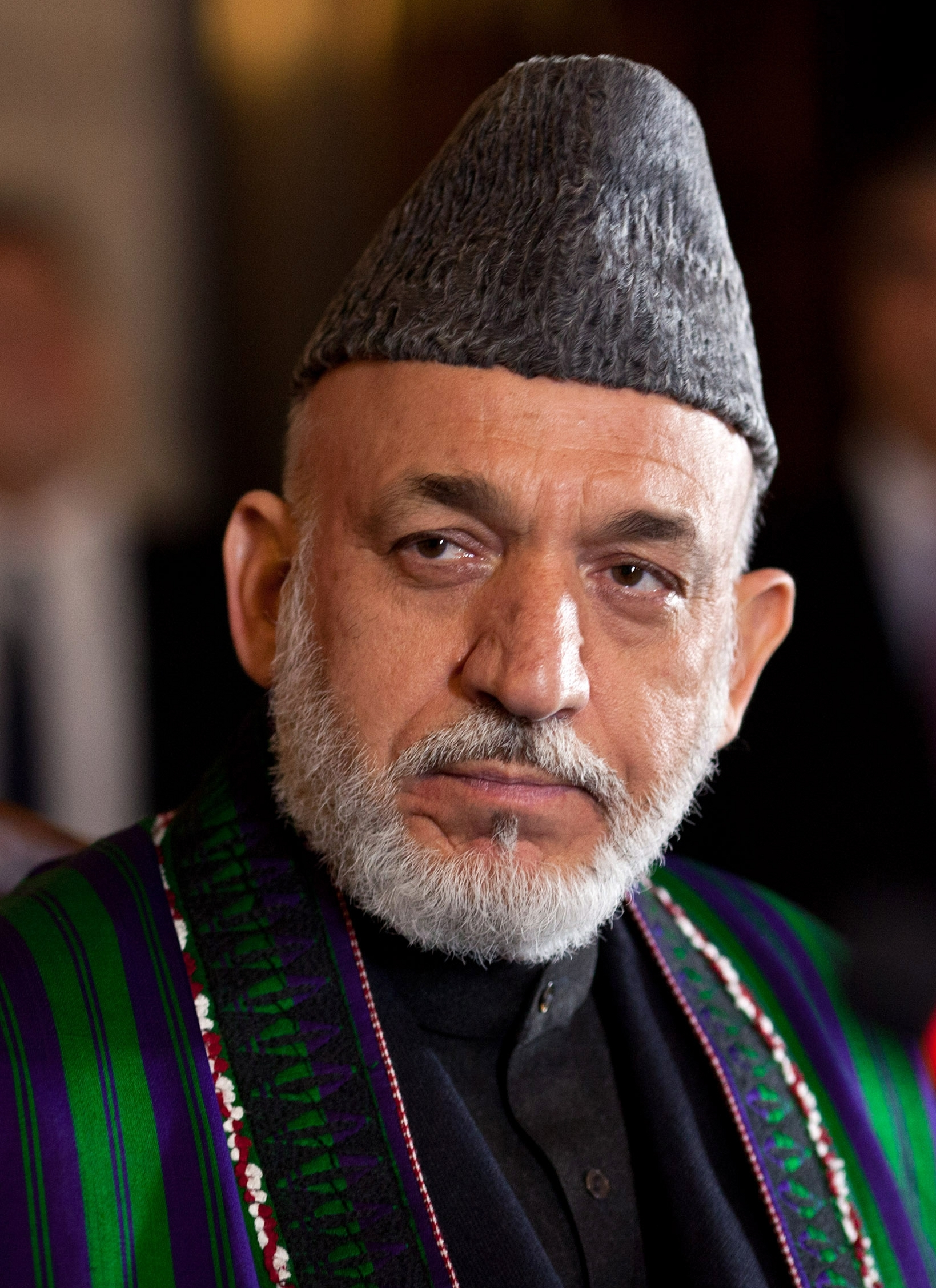
Hamid Karzai, president of the Islamic Republic of Afghanistan from 2001 to 2014

- Bismillah Afghanmal, politician and former governor
- Habibullah Agha, politician and minister
- Faiz Ahmad, politician and leader of the Afghanistan Liberation Organization
- Hasan Akhund, politician and prime minister of Afghanistan
- Ahmadullah Alizai, politician and former governor
- Abdul Rashid Arian, politician and former minister
- Mohammad Nur Ahmad Etemadi, politician and former prime minister of Afghanistan
- Shakiba Hashemi, politician and former MP
- Abdul Hakim Haqqani, politician and chief justice of Afghanistan
- Abdul Rahim Hatif, politician and former acting president of Afghanistan
- Gul Agha Ishakzai, politician and minister
- Shabir Isoufi, former national football player
- Fariba Ahmadi Kakar, politician and former MP
- Obaidulah Jan Kandahari, singer
- Hamid Karzai, politician and former president of Afghanistan
- Zeenat Karzai, former First Lady of Afghanistan
- Khairullah Khairkhwa, politician, governor and former minister
- Abdur Rahman Khan, politician and former Emir of Afghanistan
- Mohammad Ayub Khan, politician and former Emir of Afghanistan
- Sher Ali Khan, politician and former Emir of Afghanistan
- Akhtar Mansour, former supreme leader of the Taliban
- Neda Mohammad, politician and minister
- Naghma, singer
- Nashenas, singer
- Mohammad Arif Noorzai, politician and former minister
- Nur Ahmed Nur, politician and former minister
- Mullah Omar, former supreme leader of the Taliban
- Yousef Pashtun, politician and former minister
- Mohammad Rabbani, politician and former prime minister of Afghanistan
- Gul Agha Sherzai, politician and former governor and minister
- Rona Tarin, politician and former MP
- Assadullah Wafa, politician and former governor
- Muhammad Yousuf Wafa, politician and governor
- Toryalai Wesa, politician and former governor
- Zalmai Wesa, politician and former governor
