= Daman, Afghanistan =

Location in Kandahar, Afghanistan

Daman
- Location in Afghanistan
- Coordinates: 31°37′11″N 65°53′50″E
- Country: Afghanistan
- Province: Kandahar Province
- District: Daman District
- Elevation: 3,402 ft (1,037 m)
- Time zone: UTC+4:30

Daman (Pashto: دامن) is a village and the center of Daman District, Kandahar Province, Afghanistan. It is located at 1,037 metres (3,402 ft) altitude close to the main road from Kandahar to Kabul, east of Kandahar.

== Villages ==
1. Dayi, Daman District

== See also ==
- Kandahar Province
