= George Doman =

American rapper (born 1983)

- Born: August 6, 1983 (age 43)
- Origin: Chicago, Illinois, United States
- Genres: Hip-Hop; Pop
- Occupations: Disability Advocate; Hip-Hop Artist
- Years active: 2007-present
- Labels: Georgetragic; Empire; Warner Music Group
- Spinoffs: Macadoshis; Napolean; Michaela Shiloh; DJ Vlad; Daniel Pemberton; Gerard K. Marino; Junkie-XL; Shadows Fall; JoJo Simmons Jr; Ren Thomas
- Website: http://www.georgetragic.com
George Doman
- Education: Full Sail University
- Height: 5 ft 6 in (168 cm)

George Doman (born August 6, 1983 in Chicago, Illinois), best known by his stage name Georgetragic is an American disability advocate, hip-hop artist, and music business scholar.

== Early life and education ==
Doman was born with cerebral palsy. He earned his bachelor's degree in Music Business and master's in digital marketing from Full Sail University in 2019 and 2020 respectively, he continued at Full Sail University to receive a master's degree in extended studies for the media arts in 2024.

== Career ==
He started his career in the music industry In 2007 by winning a Myspace contest which resulted in a spot on Sony's "God of War 2" video game soundtrack.

In 2020, Doman contributed a verse for Rising Phoenix, a Netflix documentary about Paralympians which earned him a 2021 Sports Emmy for Outstanding Music Direction and Outstanding Long Sports Documentary

In 2021, he joined International Paralympic Committee as a Brand Campaign Assistant for the global campaign WeThe15. He joined Warner Music Group as a Collaborator at Global D.E.I Institute in October 2022.

== Discography ==
Song Information
Serial No.	Title	Album	Year
1	Rising Phoenix	Rising Phoenix	2020
2	Alone	Are You Still Watching?	2020
3	Pouring Pain	Are You Still Watching?	2020
4	Contact High	Are You Still Watching?	2020
5	Story	Story	2017
6	Every App Though	Every App Though (feat. JoJo Simmons)	2016
7	Faded	Faded	2016
8	Still My Rock	Gift I Cherish	2016
9	Party in a Bottle	Gift I Cherish	2016
10	Twin Glocks	Gift I Cherish	2016
11	Grandma	Gift I Cherish	2016
12	X'cuse Me	Gift I Cherish	2016
13	Watch My Style	Gift I Cherish	2016
14	Rock Dis	Gift I Cherish	2016
15	I'm Chosen	Gift I Cherish	2016
16	Glimpse	Glimpse	2015
17	Industry Epidemic	The Reintroduction	2015
18	Traces Of Kings	The Reintroduction	2015
19	My Entertainment	The Reintroduction	2015
20	Dimepiece	The Reintroduction	2015
21	Handicap-Hop	The Reintroduction	2015
22	I Put It Down	The Reintroduction	2015
23	They Realize A Gift Isn't Cursed	The Reintroduction	2015
24	Time 2 Party	The Reintroduction	2015
25	Touch You	The Reintroduction	2015
26	Your A Star	The Reintroduction	2015
27	Suicide	The Reintroduction	2015
28	Rain Money	Digikill Underground	2015
29	Crush	Digikill Underground	2015
30	God of War 2 Video Game Soundtrack		2007

== Accolades ==
Year	Awarding body	Category	Result	Ref
2007	Game Audio Network Guild Awards	Best Original Soundtrack	Won	
2021	Sports Emmy Awards	Outstanding Music Direction and Outstanding Long Sports Documentary	Won	
2022	Clio Awards	Silver Award	Won	
