= Daman District, Afghanistan =

Coordinates: 31.2°N 65.8°E

Daman District دامان ولسوالۍ
- District
- Interactive map of Daman District
- Country: Afghanistan
- Province: Kandahar Province
- Center: Town of Daman

Population (2006)
  - Total: 30,700
- Time zone: + 4.30

Daman District (Pashto: دامان ولسوالۍ) is situated in the central part of the Kandahar Province, Afghanistan. It borders Panjwai and Kandahar districts to the west, Shah Wali Kot District to the north, Zabul Province to the northeast, Arghistan and Spin Boldak districts to the east and Reg District to the south. The population is 30,700 (2006). The center is the village of Daman, located in the central part of the district. The area is irrigated by the Helmand and Arghandab Valley Authority.

The Kandahar International Airport is in the central part of the district, South-West from Daman. The district is currently being focused by USAID and CIDA where hundreds of projects are being implemented.

== Villages ==
1. Dayi, Daman District

2. Landai Kalli

3. Naway Deh

4. Byaban Dara

5. Bashar Kalli

6. Saidano Kalacha

7.

8.
