= Kandahar District =

Kandahar District د کندهار ولسوالی
- District
- Interactive map of Kandahar District
- Country: Afghanistan
- Province: Kandahar
- Center: Kandahar
- No. of nahias: 15

Government
  - Type: Municipality
  - Mayor: Mullah Hekmatullah

Area
  - Land: 273 km^{2} (105 sq mi)
- Elevation: 1,010 m (3,310 ft)

Population
  - Estimate (2025): 732,629
- Time zone: UTC+04:30 (Afghanistan Time)
- ISO 3166 code: AF-KAN
- Website: kandahar-m.gov.af

Kandahar District (Pashto: د کندهار ولسوالی) is one of the 20 districts of Kandahar Province in southern Afghanistan, with an estimated population of 732,629 settled residents. It encompasses Kandahar, the capital and largest city of Kandahar Province.

The administrative center of Kandahar District is the city of Kandahar, which is divided into 15 nahias (city districts). Every nahia has a police station and a number of neighborhoods. Mullah Hekmatullah serves as the current mayor of the city. His predecessor was Haji Nimatullah Hassan.

Kandahar District has a land area of 273 km^{2} (105 sq mi) or 27,337 ha (67,550 acres). In 2015 the district had 61,902 dwelling units in it.

Kandahar District borders the following districts, in clockwise: Shah Wali Kot District in the north; Daman District in the east and south; Panjwai District in the southwest; Zherai District in the west; and Arghandab District in the northwest.

== See also ==
- Districts of Afghanistan
