= Shah Wali Kot District =

District in Kandahar Province, Afghanistan

Coordinates: 32.1°N 66.0°E

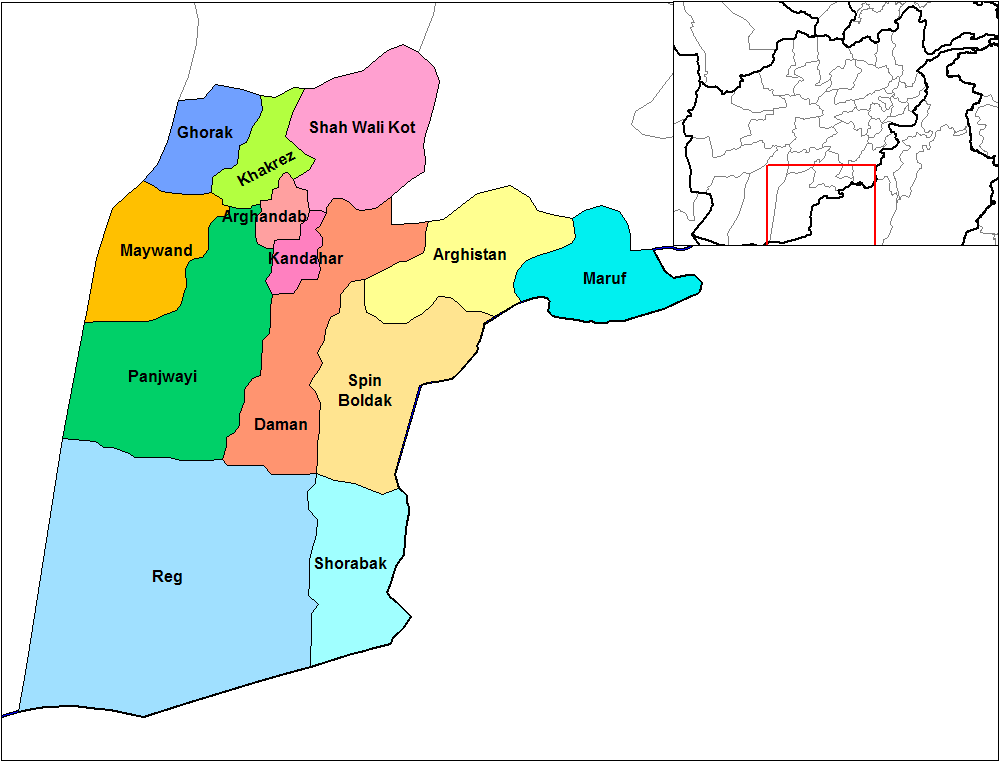
Map of Kandahar districts

Shah Wali Kot District (Pashto: شاه ولي کوټ ولسوالۍ) is situated in the northern part of Kandahar Province, Afghanistan. It borders Khakrez District to the west, Naish District and Oruzgan Province to the north, Zabul Province to the east and Daman and Arghandab districts to the south. The population is 38,400 (2006). The district center is located in the most southern part of the district. The district has been known as a stronghold of the Taliban forces.

== List of recent incidents ==
- On April 22, 2006, four Canadian soldiers were killed by a roadside bomb.
- On October 6, 2008, at least 40 civilians attending a wedding were killed in a coalition airstrike.
- On June 10–14, 2010 Afghan, Australian, and United States forces conducted the Shah Wali Kot Offensive.
- On August 16, 2012, the crash of a U.S. Black Hawk that killed 7 U.S. troops was later claimed by Taliban forces.
