= Durrani =

Pashtun tribe

دراني
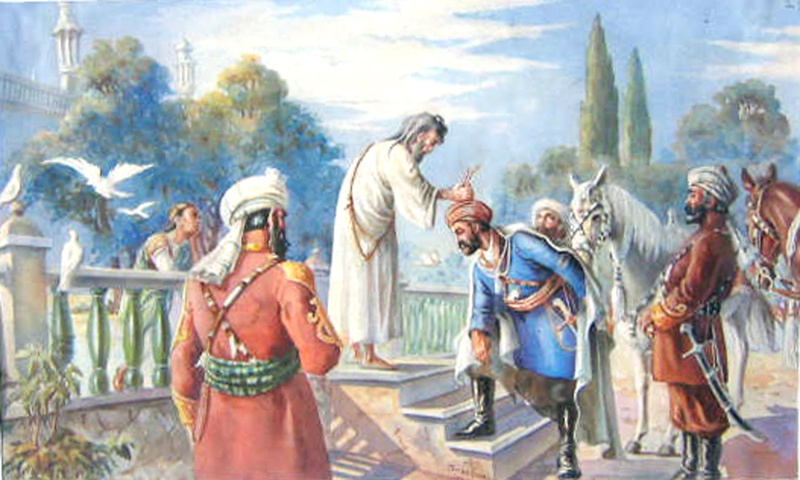
- Coronation of Ahmad Shah Durr-i-Durrān by Abdali chiefs at Kandahar in 1747

Total population
- 7 million in Afghanistan and 1.2 million in Pakistan

Regions with significant populations
- Afghanistan; Iran; Pakistan

Languages
- Pashto

Religion
- Islam

The Durrānī (Pashto: دراني, pronounced [durɑˈni]^{1}), formerly known as Abdālī (ابدالي), are one of the largest tribal confederation of Pashtuns. Their traditional homeland is in southern Afghanistan (Loy Kandahar region), straddling into Toba Achakzai in Balochistan, Pakistan, but they are also settled in other parts of Afghanistan and parts of Khyber Pakhtunkhwa.

Ahmad Shah Durrani, who is considered the founder of the modern state of Afghanistan, belonged to the Abdali tribe. In 1747 after establishing the Durrani Empire based in Kandahar, he adopted the epithet Shāh Durr-i-Durrān, "King, Pearl of Pearls," and changed the name of his Tareen Abdali tribe to "Durrani" after himself.

== Origins ==
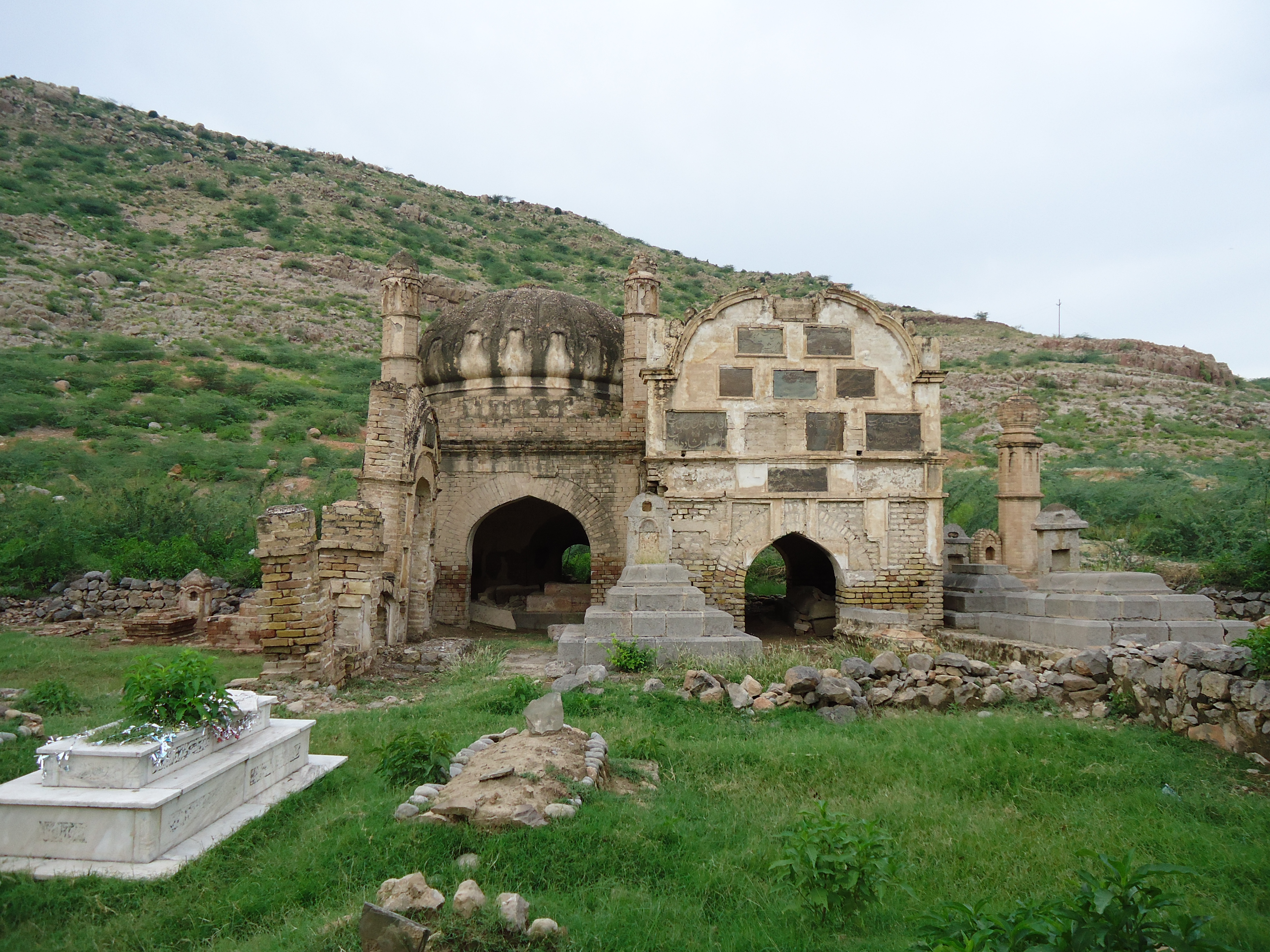
Graveyard of 19th-century Durrani princes and princesses in Kohat, Khyber Pakhtunkhwa, Pakistan.

The origins of the Durrani, formerly known as the Abdali, are unclear and there is no consensus among scholars.

Many scholars such as Georg Morgenstierne, Aydogdy Kurbanov, Charles Masson, Henry Walter Bellew, Joseph T. Arlinghaus and Yu. V. Gankovsky have suggested that the Durranis are descended from the Hephthalites. The evidence for this includes the phonological similarity of the Hephthalites' endonym, Ebodalo, to the name Abdali. However, this theory has remained a matter of debate.

== History ==
=== Early history ===
The Abdalis were recorded to have been a Sheep herding nomadic tribe, According to some traditions, the Abdalis migrated to southern Afghanistan in early 15th century, probably migrating from Ghor. One of the earliest mention of Abdalis is during the early 16th century, When Shah Abbas I bestowed supreme command of it to Sado, chief of the Popalzai tribe, With the title Mir-i Afāghina. According to Safavid sources, it suggests that there was some kind of political unity that have been established among Abdali tribes. This union was established to probably fight against rival tribes such as the Yusufzai, Muhammad and others. The Abdalis were successful at displacing these rival tribes with the aid of the Safavids. some of the Abdali tribal confederation lived in east of Kandahar. By the 18th century, many Abdali tribes were displaced by the Ghalji tribe, they were forced to migrate to Mountains of Herat region. There they were able to take control of the region and established the Abdali principality of Herat. The Abdali tribal confederation increased in numbers, due to many other local tribes in Herat region joining the Abdali tribal confederation. The principality was short lived as it was conquered by Nader Shah Afshar. Nader Shah recruited many Abdali tribesmen into his army. one of the Abdali tribal contingent commander was Ahmad Khan, the second son of Muhammad Zaman Khan chief of the Sadozai branch of Abdalis. Due to their service in the Afsharid army, Nader Shah rewarded the Abdalis by restoring their lands in Kandahar.

=== Durrani Empire ===
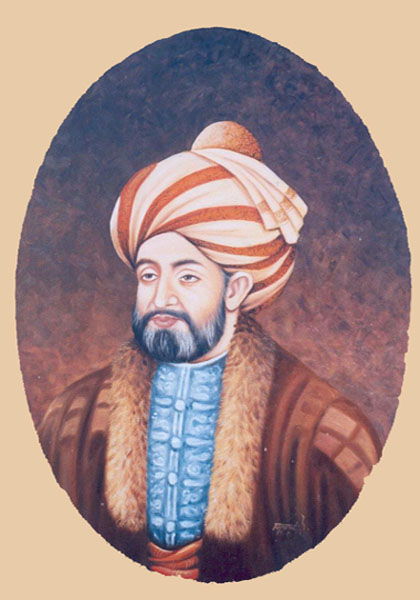
Ahmad Shah Durrani (1747–1772), founder of the Durrani Empire, belongs to Popalzai

In 1747, Ahmad Shah Durrani established the Durrani Empire with its capital at Kandahar. He adopted the title Shāh Durr-i-Durrān, "King, Pearl of Pearls," and changed the name of his tribe "Abdali" to "Durrani" after himself.

Ahmad Shah is now regarded as the founder of the modern state of Afghanistan. Within a few years, he extended his control from Khorasan in the west to Kashmir and North India in the east, and from the Amu Darya in the north to the Arabian Sea in the south.

=== Barakzai dynasty ===
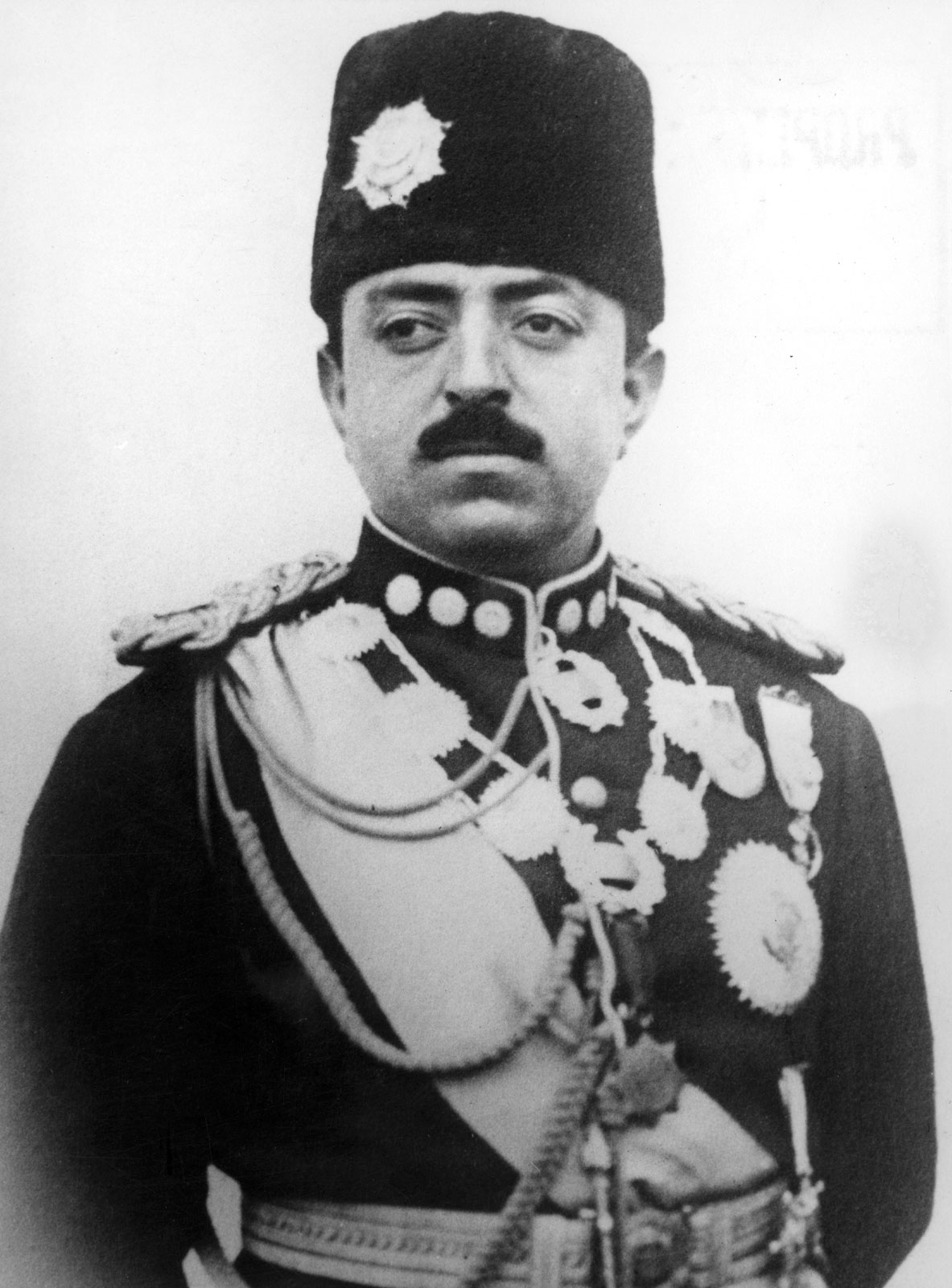
King Amanullah Khan (1919–1929), under whom Afghanistan gained independence over its foreign policy from the British Raj

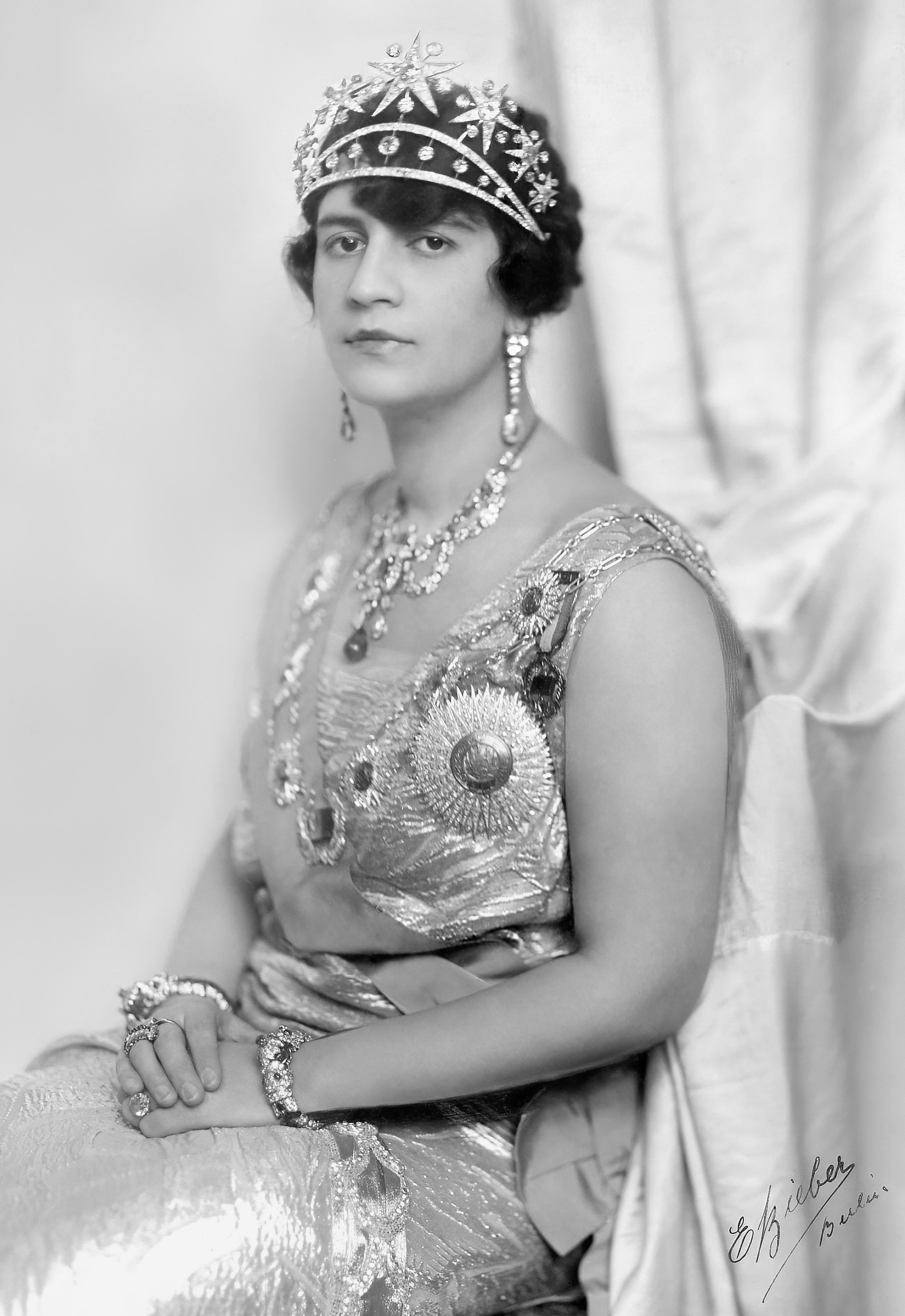
Queen Soraya Tarzi, wife of King Amanullah Khan

In 1823, Emir Dost Mohammad Khan, who belonged to the Barakzai tribe of Durranis, founded the Barakzai dynasty centered at Kabul. Thereafter, his descendants ruled in direct succession until 1929 when King Amanullah Khan, under whom Afghanistan gained independence over its foreign policy from the British Raj, was forced to abdicate and his cousin Mohammed Nadir Shah was later elected king. The Barakzai dynasty ruled present-day Afghanistan until 1973 when Mohammed Zahir Shah, the last Barakzai king, was overthrown in a bloodless coup by his cousin Mohammed Daoud Khan. The coup ended the Barakzai kingdom and established the Republic of Afghanistan (1973—1978).

=== Contemporary period ===
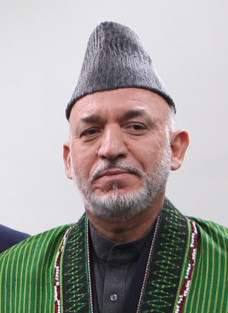
Hamid Karzai, former Afghan president (2001–2014) and leader of the Popalzai clan of Durranis

Contemporarily, the former Afghan president Hamid Karzai (2001–2014), like Ahmad Shah Durrani, also belongs to the Popalzai clan of Durranis.

The current leader of the Taliban - Hibatullah Akhundzada is a member of Nurzai Panjpai.

== Pashto dialect ==
Although many are bilingual in Dari Persian, the Durrani of southern Afghanistan speak Southern Pashto, also known as "Kandahari Pashto", the "soft" dialect of Pashto. It is considered one of the most prestigious varieties of Pashto. This dialect retains archaic retroflex sibilants [ʂ] and [ʐ], which have merged into other phonemes in other dialects. Southern Pashto also preserves the affricates [t͡s] and [d͡z], which have merged into [s] and [z] in some dialects.

The Tareen (Tarin) tribe is historically closely related to Durranis. Although most Tareens speak Southern Pashto, a small section of the Spin clan of Tareens living east of Quetta speaks the unique Wanetsi (Tareeno) dialect of Pashto, which is considered by some linguists to be distinctive enough to be classified as its own language. According to linguist Prods Oktor Skjaervo: "The Pashto area split into two dialect groups at a pre-literary period, represented today on the one hand by all the dialects of modern Pashto and on the other by Wanetsi and by archaic remains in other southeast dialects."

== Subtribes ==
- Sarban
- Tareen
- Achakzai
- Alakozai
- Badozai
- Miana
- Bamozai
  - Nawabi
- Barech
- Ghoryakhel
  - Khalil
  - Daulatyar
    - Daulatzai
  - Chamkani
  - Mattezai
    - Halimzai
  - Daudzai
  - Mulagori
  - Hazarbuz
  - Bayazidkhel
  - Shilmani
  - Zakhil
  - Zeerani
  - Zakhilwal
  - Khawezai
- Hanbhi
- Ishaqzai
- Kiral
- Loni
- Mohammadzai
- Nurzai
- Panjpai
  - Alizai
- Zirak
  - Barakzai
  - Popalzai
    - Habibzai
    - Sadozai
    - Sudhan
    - Wazirzada

== Notables ==
- Ahmad Shah Durrani, Founded Afghanistan
- Amanullah Khan, Initiated war on the British Empire for Afghan Sovereignty in the 1919 Anglo-Afghan War
- Mohammad Zahir Shah, King of Afghanistan
- Mohammad Daud Khan, Afghanistan's first President
- Mahmud Khan Achakzai, Pashtun Nationalist Politician of Balochistan and Chairman of the Pashtunkhwa Milli Awami Party (PKMAP)
- Hibatullah Akhundzada, Supreme Leader of the Islamic Emirate of Afghanistan
- Hamid Karzai, President of the Islamic Republic of Afghanistan
- Abdul Ghani Baradar, Afghan Taliban Mullah and Deputy Minister
- Pashtana Durrani, Pashtun Educationist Woman's rights activist
- Mahmud Ali Durrani, Pakistan National Security Advisor and two-star rank general officer
- Mullah Naqib, was a former Mujahideen Freedom Fighter during the Soviet-Afghan War from Southern Afghanistan
- Abdul Raziq Achakzai, Afghan Police Chief
- Ismatullah Muslim, Militia leader during the war in the 80s who rose in the Afghan Army while collaborating with Pakistani Intelligence and eventually defecting to pro-PDPA government forces
- Obaidulah Jan Kandahari, Classical Pashto singer who was prominent in Kandahar and Quetta where his music was most popular
- Gul Agha Sherzai, former Afghan Mujahideen who became Governor of Nangarhar
- Ataullah K. Ozai‐Durrani, Afghan inventor known for a method of creating instant rice, sold to General Foods Corporation.
- Abdul Ghafoor Khan Durrani, chief of Popalzai Durrani tribe in Balochistan
- Hayatullah Khan Durrani, Pakistani mountaineer
- Ayesha Durrani, Afghan poet

== Notes ==
- ^1In Pashto, "Durrani" (دراني, [durɑˈni]) is the plural form of the word. Its masculine singular is "Durranai" (درانی, [durɑˈnay]), while its feminine singular is "Durraney" (درانۍ, [durɑˈnəy]).

== See also ==
- Tareen
- Ghilji
- Yusufzai
- Kakar
