= Muhammad Yousuf Wafa =

Governor of Balkh, Afghanistan

Haji Muhammad Yousuf Wafa
- حاجي محمد یوسف وفا

Governor of Balkh
- Acting
- Assumed office March 2023
- Supreme Leader: Hibatullah Akhundzada
- Preceded by: Daud Muzamil

Governor of Kandahar
- In office August 2021 – March 2023
- Supreme Leader: Hibatullah Akhundzada
- Preceded by: Rohullah Khanzada
- Succeeded by: Mullah Shirin Akhund

Haji Mohammad Yousuf Wafa (Pashto: حاجي محمد یوسف وفا) is an Afghan Taliban leader who is currently serving as the provincial governor of Afghanistan's northern Balkh Province.

== Tribal affiliation ==
Wafa is a Durrani Pashtun belonging to the Nurzai (var. Noorzai) tribe of the Panjpai tribal confederation. (Note: Although Nurzai self-associate with the Panjpai confederation of Durrani Pashtuns, members of the Zirak confederation of Durranis reject this claim, asserting instead that Nurzai belong to the Ghilzai.) The Nurzai and greater Durrani Pashtuns are historically rooted in southeastern Afghanistan, namely Kandahar where the throne of the Durrani Empire was established in 1747.

=== Relationship with the supreme leader ===
Wafa reportedly maintains a close relationship with the reclusive supreme leader of Afghanistan, Mullah Haibatullah Akhundzada as fellow Nurzai tribesmen. Wafa reportedly acted as a gatekeeper to Akhundzada, meeting with individuals before allowing them to visit the supreme leader.

Wafa was named to be among the Kandahari hardliner faction along with Akhundzada, Hajj minister Nur Muhammad Saqib, Supreme Court Chief Justice Abdul Hakim Haqqani, and Director of Science Farid. The Kandahari faction appeared to favor strictly conservative policies in line with the 1996–2001 Taliban regime and opposed reform measures tied to increased international recognition. The opposite faction, called the Qatar group for its role in the Doha Accords negotiations, is reported to consist of Abdul Kabir, Sirajuddin Haqqani, Abdul Ghani Baradar, Muttaqui, and Mullah Yaqoob and favors the social and human rights reforms asked by foreign nations to being talks of diplomatic recognition.

== Career ==
=== Battle of Kandahar ===
After NATO forces had largely withdrawn from Kandahar as part of the larger summer 2021 withdrawal from Afghanistan, Taliban troops fought a month-long battle against remaining Afghan National Army (ANA) forces of the collapsing Islamic Republic of Afghanistan, backed by U.S. Air Force close air support. Though key Afghan government officials and military personnel were evacuated through Kandahar Airport, Taliban forces led by Wafa captured the provincial capital, Kandahar City, and Wafa (service as Taliban shadow governor) accepted the surrender of the Islamic Republic of Afghanistan's provincial governor, Rohullah Khanzada.

=== Provincial Governor of Kandahar ===
Following the August 2021 Talban capture of Afghanistan, Wafa was appointed by Afghanistan's supreme leader, Mullah Haibatullah Akhundzada, to serve as the first provincial governor of Kandahar in the new Taliban-led Islamic Emirate of Afghanistan government. Kandahar continues to represent both current and historical significance to the Taliban movement as its traditional base of power and the de facto capital of the post-2021 Taliban government.

While serving as Kandahar's provincial governor, Wafa held a meeting with businessmen from the Hong-Kong-based Chinese firm CITIC Limited where he solicited Chinese investment in Kandahar Province. Other meetings convened and advertised by Wafa's office include a meeting with religious ulema to discuss the state of the ummah and a meeting with Save the Children General Manager Christo Parnimandi. In September 2021, Wafa was photographed joining a group of municipal staff to sweep the streets of Kandahar and, in the same month, reportedly gathered the city's begging women to provide them food and a monetary stipend.

==== Islamic State ====
The Islamic State's Khorasan Province conducted only one attack in Kandahar during Wafa's tenure. On 15 October 2021, four ISIS–K suicide bombers entered and conducted successive bombings in the Shia Imam Bargah Mosque (also known as the Fatima Mosque), killing at least 65 worshippers and wounding more than 70 others. The bombing occurred only one week after a similar Shia mosque bombing in Kunduz, after which the Taliban government promised additional security at Shia mosques.

=== Provincial Governor of Balkh ===
In March 2023, the provincial governor of Balkh Province, Mawlawi Mohammad Dawood Muzamil, was killed in a suicide bombing by the Islamic State' Khorasan Province (ISIS–K). Shortly after, Wafa's spokesperson Haji Zaid announced that Wafa would serve as acting governor of Balkh Province in the meantime.

While governor, Wafa met with the president of the ICRC and diplomats from six other nations in December 2023 where he was quoted as saying "Despite the fact that security prevails in Afghanistan, corruption has been eliminated and the fight against narcotics has been carried out, the world still does not want to interact with the Islamic Emirate." Wafa also asked the attending diplomats to share word of Afghanistan's success.

While governor, Wafa reportedly provided 100,000 AFN (approximately $1,400 USD) in cash to a resident who had sold his household goods out of poverty.

In April 2024, Wafa joined Uzbek deputy foreign minister Erkin Khamraev to oversee the delivery of 169 tonnes of food aid from Uzbekistan to alleviate the high rates of starvation in Afghanistan. Balkh Province is the only Afghan province to share a border with Uzbekistan.

During Wafa's tenure as Balkh provincial governor, and only days after his predecessor's assassination by ISIS–K, the group bombed an Iranian (Shia) center in the city of Mazar-i-Sharif, killing 4 and wounding 16 others.

== Controversies ==
Nurullah Adel, reportedly a close relative of Wafa, was arrested by Taliban intelligence on allegations of an extramarital affair. No confirmation of the arrest has been made.
