= Mahmoud Hassan =

Mahmoud Hassan may refer to:

- Mahmud Hasan Deobandi (1851–1920), also known as Mahmud Hasan, Deobandi Sunni Muslim scholar
- Mahmoud Hassan Pasha (1893–?), Egyptian diplomat
- Mahmud Hasan (academic) (1897–?), Bengali academic
- Mahmood Hasan Gangohi (1907–1996), Indian Mufti and Islamic scholar
- Hussein Mahmoud Hassan el-Shafei (1918–2005), Egyptian politician
- Mahmoud Hassan (wrestler) (1919–1998), Egyptian wrestler
- Mahmoud Hassan Bani-Ahmad, father of Princess Basmah Bani Ahmad
- Mahmoud Hassan (footballer, born 1943), Egyptian footballer
- Abul Hassan Mahmood Ali (born 1943), Bangladeshi politician
- Hassan Sheikh Mohamud (born 1955), Somali politician
- Mahmoud Hassan Saleh (born 1962), Egyptian footballer
- Mahmoud Hassan Mgimwa (born 1963), Tanzanian politician
- Mahmoud al-Sarkhi (Sayyid Mahmoud al-Hassani al-Sarkhi, born 1964), Iraqi Shi'ite Muslim cleric
- Adnan Hassan Mahmoud (born 1966), former minister of information of Syria
- Hassan Abdel-Fattah (Hassan Abdel-Fattah Mahmoud Al-Mahsiri, born 1982), Jordanian footballer
- Mosaab Mahmoud Al Hassan (born 1983), Qatari footballer
- Mohamed Mahmoud Hassan (born 1984), Egyptian hammer thrower
- Mahmoud Hassan (footballer, born 1984), Emirati footballer
- Trézéguet (Egyptian footballer) (Mahmoud Ahmed Ibrahim Hassan, born 1994), Egyptian footballer
- Mahmud Hassan, Bangladeshi physician
- Mahmood Hasan (diplomat), Bangladeshi ambassador to Egypt and France
- Ahmed Hassan Mahmoud, Egyptian Paralympic athlete

== See also ==
- Hassan (surname)
- Mohammed Hassan (disambiguation)
- Muhammad Hassan (disambiguation)
