= Zalmai Wesa =

Afghan politician (born 1947)

Zalmai Wesa زلمي ويسا
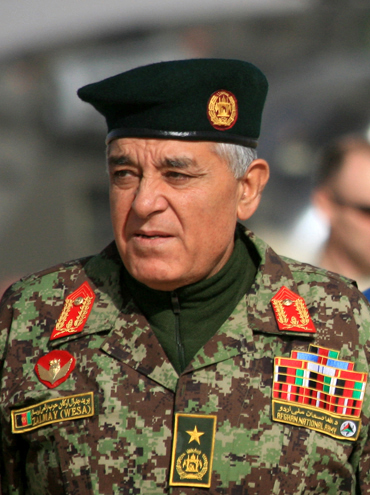
- Wesa in 2011

Governor of Kandahar Province
- In office 21 May 2017 – 18 October 2018
- Preceded by: Humayun Azizi
- Succeeded by: Hayatullah Hayat

Governor of Paktia Province
- In office 24 November 2016 – 20 May 2017

Personal details
- Born: 1947 (age 78–79) Arghandab, Kandahar, Afghanistan
- Party: Democratic Party
- Education: Moscow State University
- Profession: Major General, Former governor of Paktia Province

Zalmay Wesa (Pashto: زلمي ويسا; born 1947) is an Afghan politician. Previously Governor of eastern Paktia Province, he was appointed Governor of Kandahar Province in May 2017 when the previous governor, Humayun Azizi, was injured in the January 2017 Afghanistan bombings.

Zalmai Wesa was born in 1947 in Arghandab, Kandahar, and is the elder brother of Toryalai Wesa, a former governor of Kandahar Province. He is a member of the Afghan communist Khalq Party and received his military education in Moscow in the late 1980s. In 2013 he held the rank of Major General with the 209th Corps.

Wesa was wounded in an assassination attempt by a bodyguard in October 2018, and was erroneously reported dead. The attack killed Abdul Raziq Achakzai, the police chief of Kandahar. The Taliban later claimed responsibility.

Political offices
Preceded by Humayun Azizi	Governor of Kandahar; 21 May 2017–present	Incumbent
