= Weso =

Weso may refer to:

- WESO, a Catholic radio station in Southbridge, Massachusetts, United States
- Weso, Nevada, United States, an unincorporated community

== See also ==
- Wesa
- WESA (disambiguation)
