= List of governors of Kandahar =

This is a list of the governors of the province of Kandahar, Afghanistan.

Governor	Period	Extra	Note
Muhammad 'Amin Khan	?-1865	Governor of Kandahar, revolted against Sher Ali Khan in 1865 but the rebellion was crushed and he was killed.	
Sardar Mir Afzal Khan	?-1878	Sardar Mir Afzal Khan (son of Pur Dil Khan and father of Sardar Abdul Wahab Khan - governor of Mazar-i-Sharif in 1914) was the governor of Kandahar up until the start of the Second Anglo-Afghan War before leaving for Persia upon the approach of the British.	
Mohammad Hassan Khan	April 1881-July 1881	Appointed by Amir Abdur Rahman Khan after withdrawal of British forces from Afghanistan after the second Anglo-Afghan war.	
Mohammad Ayub Khan	July 1881-September 1881	Defeated Mohammad Hassan Khan and briefly ruled the province for the first time before being defeated by Amir Abdur Rahman Khan.	
Nur ul-Haq Ulumi	1989; 1992		
Gul Agha Sherzai	1992; 1994		
Mohammad Hasan Rahmani	1994; 2001		
Gul Agha Sherzai	December 2001; 16 August 2003		
Yousef Pashtun	August 2003; 2005		
Asadullah Khalid	2005; August 2008		
Rahmatullah Raufi	August 2008; 4 December 2008		
Toryalai Wesa	4 December 2008; 2014		
Hamid Masood	2014; 2015		
Humayun Azizi	27 April 2015; 21 May 2017		
Zalmai Wesa	21 May 2017; 18 October 2018		
Hayatullah Hayat	18 October 2018; 3 January 2021		
Rohullah Khanzada	3 January 2021; 12 August 2021		
Muhammad Yousuf Wafa	12 August 2021; March 2023		
Mullah Shirin Akhund	March 2023; Present		

== See also ==
- List of current provincial governors in Afghanistan
