= Afghanistan–United Arab Emirates relations =

- Afghanistan: United Arab Emirates

Diplomatic mission
- Afghan Embassy, Abu Dhabi: Emirati Embassy, Kabul

Afghanistan–United Arab Emirates relations refers to the bilateral relations between Afghanistan and the United Arab Emirates (UAE). In December 2022, Afghan Defense Minister Mullah Yaqoob along with Anas Haqqani made an official visit to the UAE. There he met with UAE President Mohamed bin Zayed Al Nahyan and Vice President Mohammed bin Rashid Al Maktoum.

== History ==
Prior to the September 11 attacks in the United States in 2001, the UAE and Saudi Arabia officially recognized the Islamic Emirate of Afghanistan (Taliban government). During the war in Afghanistan (2001–2021), the UAE had a small humanitarian and peacekeeping military presence in Afghanistan, which was part of the then-International Security Assistance Force (ISAF).

On January 10, 2017, five UAE diplomats were killed in Kandahar. They were there with Humayun Azizi to inaugurate a number of UAE backed projects. The UAE's Ambassador to Afghanistan, Juma Al Kaabi, was wounded and later died of his wounds.

After the fall of Kabul in August 2021, then-Afghan-President Ashraf Ghani flew to Uzbekistan and from there to the UAE. A few weeks later, after the United States and most countries pulled out their citizens, a UAE plane carrying aid landed at Kabul International Airport.

The UAE provided 30 metric tonnes of aid to the victims of the June 2022 Afghanistan earthquake. An additional 16 metric tonnes of medical supplies arrived in the affected area in early July. A 1,000 m^{3} (35,000 cu ft) field hospital was established in Khost. In February 2023, UAE decided to reduce its diplomatic mission in Afghanistan, amid reports that ISIS terrorist group was able to infiltrate Kabul's Green Zone, which is where the UAE embassy is located. Like the rest of the world, the UAE has also not recognized the Taliban rule of Afghanistan as legitimate.

== Afghans in the UAE ==
Around 300,000 Afghan citizens reside in the UAE where many are investors in Dubai and Abu Dhabi. Some of them could be Iranians or Pakistanis using false Afghan passports.

== See also ==
- Foreign relations of Afghanistan
- Foreign relations of the United Arab Emirates
