= Wesa =

Wesa (Pashto: ويسا) is a Pashto surname, found in Afghanistan.

Notable people with this surname include:

- Toryalai Wesa (born 1947), Afghan politician
- Zalmai Wesa (born 1947), Afghan politician

== See also ==
- WESA (disambiguation)
