= Mohammad Hasan =

Mohammad Hasan may refer to:

- Mohamad Hasan (politician) (born 1956), Malaysian politician
- Mohammad Hasan (cricketer) (born 1990), Pakistani cricketer
- Mohammad Hasan Rahmani (c. 1963–2016), Afghan Taliban leader
- Mohammad Rakibul Hasan (born 1977), Bangladeshi photojournalist and filmmaker

== See also ==
- Mohammed Hassan (disambiguation)
- Muhammad Hassan (disambiguation)
