= Mohammed Hassan =

Mohammed Hassan may refer to:

- Mohamed Hassan (Libyan musician) (born 1944), Libyan singer
- Mohamed Hassan (Egyptian musician) (born 1983), Egyptian singer
- Mohammed Abdullah Hassan (1856–1920), emir of Darawiish monarch Diiriye Guure
- Mohammad Hasan Rahmani (c. 1963–2016), Afghan politician
- Muhammad Hussein Ali Hassan (born 1966), Guantanamo Bay detainee
- Mohammed Mohammed Hassen, Yemeni Guantanamo detainee
- Mohamed Waheed Hassan (born 1953), Maldivian politician, 5th president of the Maldives
- Mohammed Hassen, Oromo historian from Ethiopia
- Mohamad Hasan (politician) (born 1956), Malaysian politician
- Mohamed H.A. Hassan (born 1947), Sudanese scientist
- Mohammad Al Hajj Hassan (born 1976), Lebanese cleric
- Mohammed Hassan Dbouk, Lebanese-Canadian accredited journalist with al-Manar television in Lebanon
- Mohammed Hassan El-Zayyat (1915–1993), Egyptian diplomat and Minister of Foreign Affairs
- Mohammed Awad (politician) (died 2007), Iraqi politician, member of Iraqi National Dialogue Council
- Mohammed Hasan Alwan (born 1979), Saudi Arabian short story writer and novelist
- Mohammad Hasan Khan Qajar (1722–1759), chief of the Qoyunlu branch of the Qajar tribe

== Sportspeople ==
- Mohamed Hassan (boxer) (born 1940), Moroccan boxer
- Mohamed Hassan (footballer, born 1985), Egyptian footballer
- Mohamed Hassan (footballer, born 1993), Egyptian footballer
- Mohamed Hassan (swimmer) (born 1972), Egyptian swimmer
- Mohamed Hassan (fencer), Egyptian fencer
- Mohamed Mehdi Hasan (born 1971), Bangladeshi Olympic sprinter
- Haris Mohammed Hassan (born 1958), Iraqi football midfielder
- Abdelilah Mohammed Hassan (born 1934), Iraqi football coach
- Mohammed Hassan (footballer, born 1905) (1905–1973), Egyptian footballer
- Mohammed Hassan Helmy (1912–1986), Egyptian footballer
- Hussain Mohamed Hassan (field hockey) (born 1971), Egyptian field hockey player
- Muhammad Hassan (wrestler), wrestler

== See also ==
- Muhammad Hassan (disambiguation)
- Mohammad Hasan (disambiguation)
