= Rohullah Khanzada =

- روح الله خانزاده

Governor of Kandahar
- In office 3 January 2021 – 12 August 2021
- President: Ashraf Ghani
- Preceded by: Hayatullah Hayat
- Succeeded by: Muhammad Yousuf Wafa

Personal details
- Born: 1971 (age 54–55) Dand District, Kandahar, Afghanistan

Rohullah Khanzada (Pashto: روح الله خانزاده, born 1971 in Dand District, Kandahar) is an Afghan politician, who served as governor of Kandahar Province from January 2021 to August 2021. Khanzada was also a member of the Afghan Cricket Board from 2020 until 15 August 2021.
