= Sadozai Wazirzada =

Descendants of the Sadduzai Dynasty

وزیر زادہ سدوزئی

Regions with significant populations
- Peshawar District, Khyber Pakhtunkhwa

Languages
- Pashto

Religion
- Islam

Related ethnic groups
- Durrani Pashtuns

Sadozai Wazirzada (Pashto: سدوزي وزیرزاده) (also known as Wazirzada Sadozai) are a Pashtun tribe of the Durrani tribal confederation, with their population primarily concentrated in the regions of Khyber Pakhtunkhwa in Pakistan. The Wazirzada's are a branch of the Sadozai tribe which itself is a branch of the Popalzai tribal group. They are descended from the Kamran Khel (clan) who went by the surname Wazirzada due to them serving as Grand Wazirs for the Sadozai ruling dynasty of the Durrani Empire. They trace their ancestry to Grand Vizier Usman Khan, who acted as the Nizam ud Daula (Grand Vizier) for Shah Shuja Durrani.

After the removal of the royal Sadozai dynasty of Ahmad Shah Durrani from rulership over the collapsing Durrani Empire and subsequent replacement by the Barakzai dynasty, many of the Sadozais including the Wazirzada branch faced prospects of political reprisal by the Barakzai and Mohammadzai due to their conflict and disputes. Most of the Sadozais faced exile from the Emirate of Afghanistan and headed towards the Indian subcontinent, with the Wazirzadas under the former Grand Vizier Usman Khan landing and settling in Peshawar in 1842.
