= Daud Muzamil =

Afghan politician (died 2023)

Mullah Muhammad Daud Muzamil Pashto: ملا محمد داود مزمل

Governor of Balkh Province
- In office 6 October 2022 – 9 March 2023
- Prime Minister: Hassan Akhund
- Preceded by: Qudratullah Abu Hamza
- Succeeded by: Muhammad Yousuf Wafa (Acting)

Governor of Nangarhar Province
- In office 21 September 2021 – 6 October 2022
- Prime Minister: Hassan Akhund
- Preceded by: Neda Mohammad
- Succeeded by: Hajji Gul Mohammad

Personal details
- Born: c. 1974 Grishk district, Republic of Afghanistan
- Died: 9 March 2023 (aged 50) Mazar-i-Sharif, Afghanistan
- Cause of death: Assassination by bombing
- Profession: Politician

Mullah Muhammad Daud Muzamil (Pashto: ملا محمد داود مزمل; 1974-died 9 March 2023) was a Taliban member in the Islamic Emirate of Afghanistan (IEA) who served as Governor of Balkh province. Prior to that, he served as Governor of Nangarhar province.

== Death ==
Muzamil was assassinated on 9 March 2023, during a special meeting with officials from Kabul in which the main issue of discussion was the Qosh Tepa Canal project in the area. According to Mohammad Asif Waziri, a police spokesman, a suicide bomber went inside the meeting and detonated his explosives. Two civilians were also killed during the attack and four others were injured.

The Islamic State – Khorasan Province (ISIS-K) later claimed responsibility for the attack. The Afghan National Security Forces, which are under IEA control, soon began special operations against ISIS-K members in the area. Those involved in the assassination of Muzamil were arrested in nearby Faryab Province. Six ISIS-K members were killed in Balkh around 4 April 2023.
