= Zafar Khan (Afghan general) =

Afghan National Army commander (b. 1953)

Brigadier General Zafar Khan
- ال محمد ظفر خان
- Born: 1953 (age 72–73); Yahyakhel District, Paktika Province, Afghanistan
- Relatives: Mohammed Nasir Khan (son)
- Military career
- Allegiance: Republic of Afghanistan Democratic Republic of Afghanistan Islamic Republic of Afghanistan
- Branch: Afghan National Army
- Rank: Brigadier General
- Commands: 37th Commando Brigade; 38th Commando Brigade; 4th Brigade, 205th Corps

Brigadier General Mohammed Zafar Khan (Pashto: ال محمد ظفر خان) (born 1953) is a commander of the Afghan National Army stationed in Uruzgan, Afghanistan. He was appointed for the post of commander of the 4th Brigade, 205th Corps on 11 September 2010.

== Early life and education ==
Zafar Khan is the son of Lt. Haji Shah Alam, an ethnic Pashtun, and was born in 1953 in Yahyakhel District of Paktika Province. His father moved him to Kabul and admitted him to Harbi Shownzai to train him to be an army officer. He passed out from Harbi Shownzai and began studies at Harbi Puhantun. He achieved a scholarship to attend a Soviet military academy in Moscow and completed his further studies for 6–7 years. On his return from Moscow he enrolled himself in paratroop course of Afghanistan and then commando course of Maslak-e-Commando.

== Career ==
On the completion of his military training, Zafar Khan was offered the post of commander of a company-sized unit (toli) in Harbi Puhantun in 1976, and his other posts followed later. He also was a member of the Khalq faction of the People's Democratic Party of Afghanistan.

Posts
Pre-Taliban Posts
Commander of Company-sized units(Toli)	1976
Commander of Battalion of 37th Commando Brigade	1979
Commander of 38th Brigade, Zabul	1984
Commander of 38th Commando Brigade, Paktika	1988
Commander of and Lieutenant General of 40th Army, Bagram	1988–90
Post-Taliban Posts
Brigadier General of 4th Brigade, 205th Corps	2010–

== The Battle of 8 March 1990 between Tanai's Khalq party and Najib's Parcham party. ==
=== Involvement in the Coup of March 1990 ===
On 8 March 1990, Shahnawaz Tanai and his Army personnel with the help of mujahideen commander, Gulbuddin Hekmatyar launched a coup against the then Russian-backed President Mohammad Najibullah. As Najibullah was transferring all the privileges of the Army to the tribal militias and in particular to his special guard, this policy intensified Tanai for which he launched the coup.

President Najibuulah was a member of the Parcham faction of the Communist People's Democratic Party of Afghanistan (PDPA) whereas Defence Minister Shahnawaz Tanai was a member of the Khalq faction of the People's Democratic Party of Afghanistan. After launching the Coup, Tanai taking asylum in Bagram with Lieutenant General Zafar Khan(the Commander in charge of 40th Army Corps, Bagram Airfield and Military Base) and Abdul Qadir Aqa (Air Force Commander) ordered to air strike against Government Buildings. Hekmatyar also ordered his fighters to intensify their attacks against the Kabul regime in support of Tanai. The battle of 8 March 1990 continued as the Khalq party attacked Kabul with 40th Army Corps from Bagram Base and the Parcham party continued attacks on Bagram Base with 8th Army Corps, Ministry of Defence for Govt., Republic Guard, and his own Guards. In the meanwhile Russians backed Najib with huge supplies and troops which resulted in the breakdown of Khalq Hizb.

After the battle, 80 senior officers including Generals and Commanders have seemed to be dead, 27 Khalqi officers along with Hekmatyar and Tanai escaped to Pakistan and 127 Khalqi officers were sentenced to life imprisonment among which Lt. General Zafar Khan, General Abdul Wahab, Lt. General Aziz Rahman, Colonel Sadiq were some of the prisoners.

=== After the Coup of 1990 ===
As Tanai failed with his unsuccessful attempt, Mohammad Najibullah along with his guard and soldiers won the battle of 8 March 1990. He appeared on TV at 10 p.m. the same night to prove that he was physically there and in effective control of the state apparatus. But after he survived the coup, there grew the increasing tensions of the shortage of fuel and food at the end of winter in 1992, as all his supplies have either been damaged or consumed by the people and soldiers. On April 16, having lost internal control, was forced to resign by his own ruling party, following the capture of the strategically important Bagram air base and the nearby town of Charikar, by the Jamiat-e Islami guerrilla group and overnight Najib's regime became weaker and collapsed in winter 1992. As the Mujaheedin commanders entered the Kabul streets, now the entire Govt. was under the control of Mujaheedin.

Hazrat Saheb became the president and the prisoners under Najib's regime were released. After the release, the officers fled to foreign countries along with their family and the regime of Taliban started. But even today, out of 127 officers 50 of them are still maintaining positions in Afghan National Army (ANA).

== Current status ==
General Zafar Khan was appointed Commander of 4th Brigade, 205th Hero Corps in Uruzgan province, Afghanistan on 11 September 2010.

He also shares some of his views on the development of Afghan National Army.

- Afghan National Army soldiers and sergeants should be educated about fighter aircraft, artillery and modern equipments adequately to defend against insurgent activities. If not provided with proper equipments and knowledge the ANA will fail to defend and protect the country.
- The authority of defence from coalition forces should be transferred to Afghan National Army(ANA). The ANA and the Afghan National Police is quite capable to defend the county.
- The ANA Soldiers and Commanders should be taught to maintain loyalty and discipline in their respective positions. Due to the lack of discipline many ANA soldiers who are disturbed having no options left proceed to desert.
- Each Soldier, Sergeant and Commander should be made aware about their honorary posts and qualification. As frequent disrespect behavior among the team or with seniors causes a mess following which the entire Brigade is disturbed.
