= Gul Aqa Nahib =

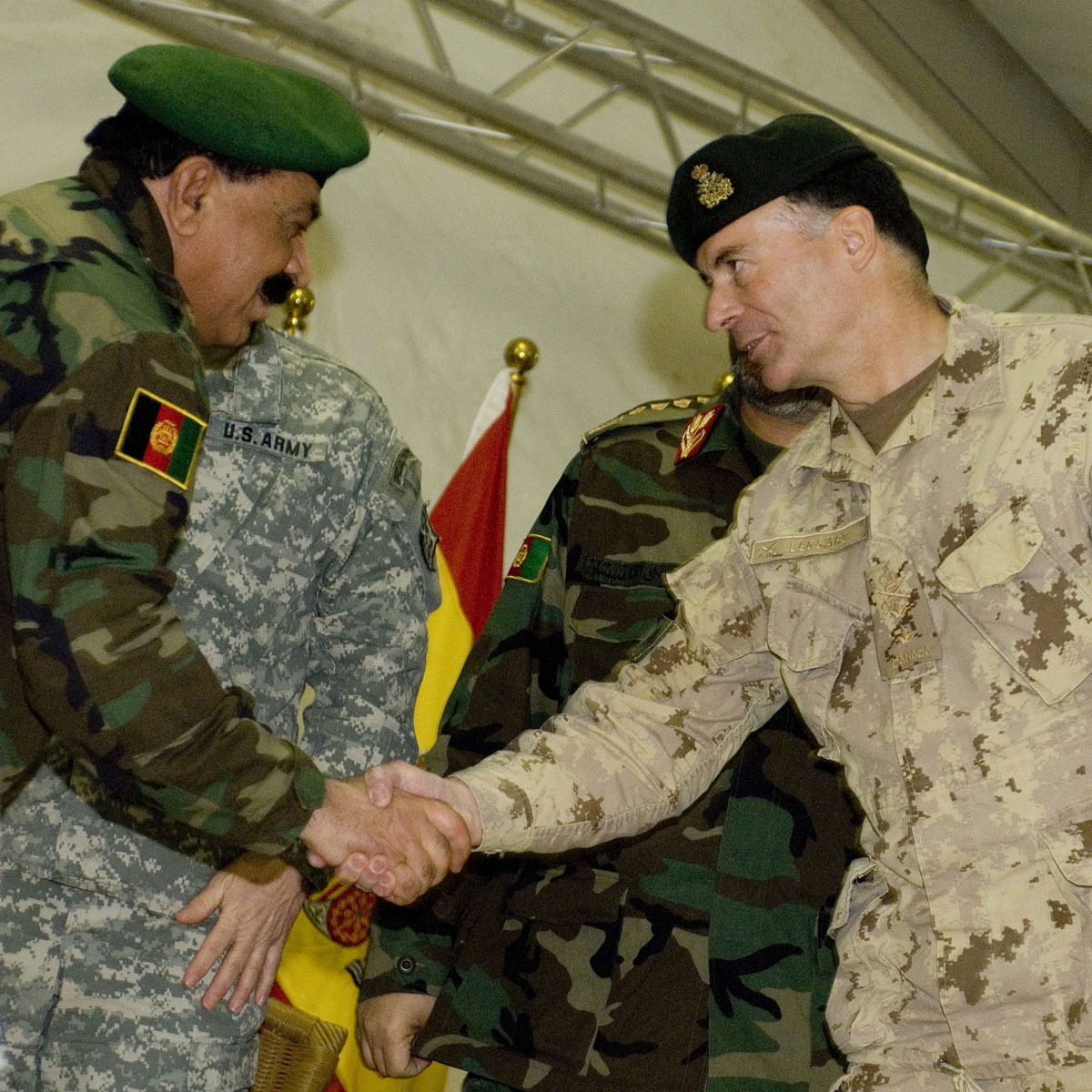

Brigadier General Gul Aqa Nahib (died on June 3, 2020) (also, "Nahibi", "Naebi", or simply "Gul Aqa"; Pashto: ګل اقا نايبي) of the Afghan National Army served as second-in-command to transitional Defence Minister Mohammed Fahim in 2002 and was in charge of 12,000 troops overseeing operations in Kandahar.

He joined the army in 1965

His formal position is as commander of the Afghan 205th Corps, based out of Kandahar Airport, and he was in charge of operations for Southern Afghanistan.

During the 1980s war he fought against the mujahedin in areas like Herat (1981–82) and Khaust (1990–91). Jalaluddin Haqqani arrested him when Khaust fell during April 1991. He served as the army's commissar or political affairs officer till 1982, when Yasin Sadiqi replaced him.

On September 9, 2007, he reported that insurgent forces were no longer able to beat ANA troops in combat.

He spoke Dari, in addition to his native Pashto and supported the idea of conscription.

He died on June 3, 2020.
