= Kiral =

Pashtun tribe

The Kiral (Pashto: کیرال) are a small Durrani Pashtun tribe located in Maruf district, Kandahar province, Afghanistan. Their affiliation with a larger tribe or tribal confederation is unknown.
