= 205th Corps =

Afghan military unit

- Emblem of the 205th Corps
- Active: 19 September 2004 –August 2021
- Country: Islamic Republic of Afghanistan
- Branch: Afghan National Army
- Type: Corps
- Headquarters: Camp Shirzai, Kandahar Province, Afghanistan
- Nickname: Atal (Hero)
- Engagements: War in Afghanistan (2001–2021)

Commanders
- Last commander: General Shafiqullah Rasulzai
- Notable commanders: Gul Aqa Nahib; Rahmatullah Raufi

Insignia
- Corps Flag

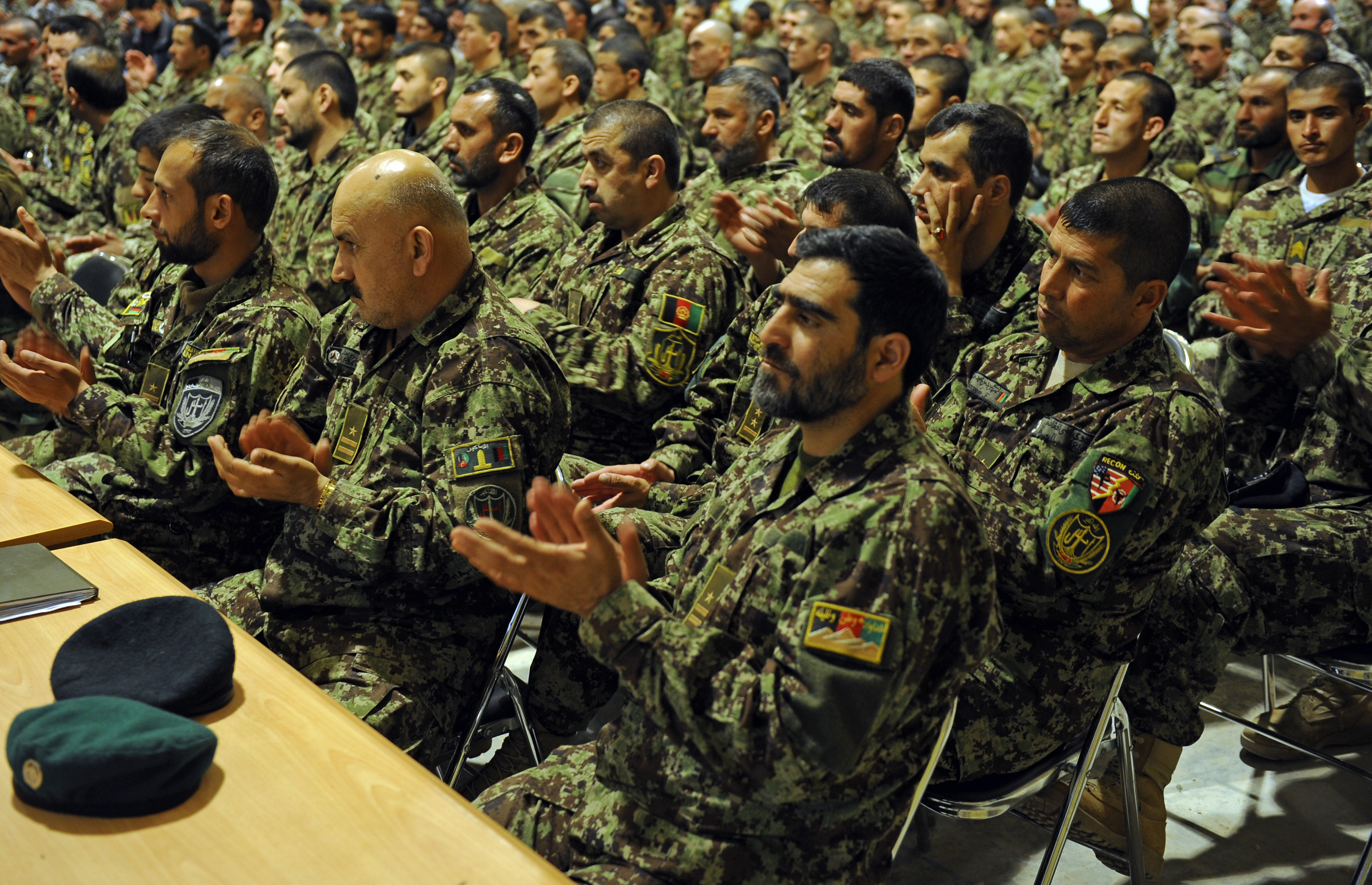
Soldiers of the 205th Corps in Zabul Province.

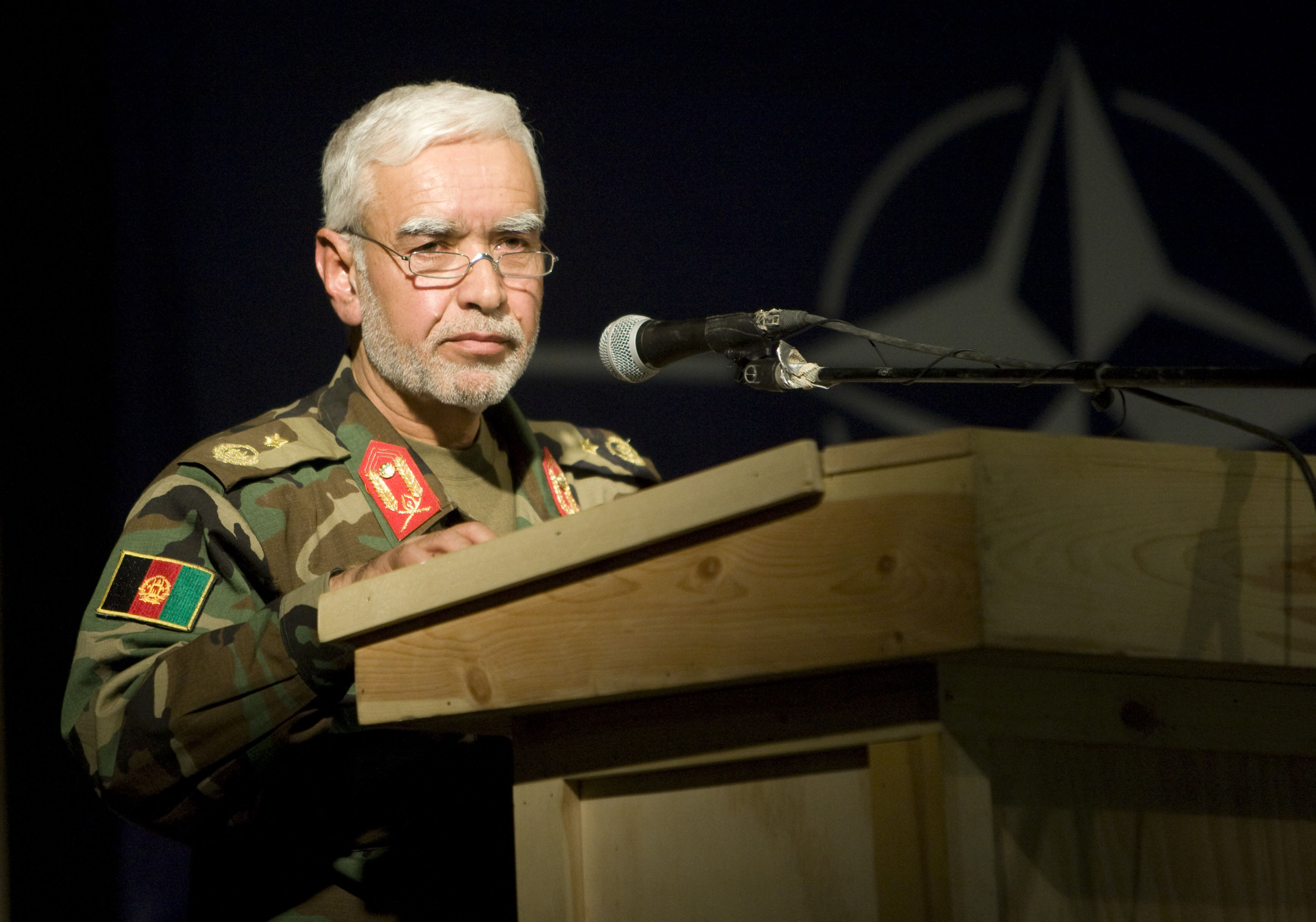
General Zazai, commander of the 205th corps in 2009

The 205th 'Atul' (Hero) Corps is a corps-level formation of the Afghan Army. Its headquarters is located in Kandahar and it was responsible for the south of the country (Kandahar, Zabul, Oruzgan, Helmand and Nimruz provinces), partnered with the ISAF's Regional Command South.

The Corps consisted of four brigades, a commando battalion and three garrisons. The Corps had integrated artillery and air lift capacity.

General Shafiqullah Rasulzai was appointed as the commander of the Corps in late November/December 2020. He was also the last commander of the Corps when it was still part of the Afghan national army. In August 2021, the Corps was defeated during the Taliban offensive and in Battle of Kandahar.

However, in February 2025, during border clashes between Afghanistan and Pakistan, which had intensified in December of 2024, the Taliban deployed the 205th Corps of Kandahar to Helmand province in order to fortify positions near the Pakistan-Afghanistan border in response to clashes between the Pakistani Frontier Corps and Afghan Taliban border guards, thereby confirming the unit's continued existence.

== History ==
Previous Afghan Army formations in the south of Afghanistan, more specifically in Kandahar, were the 2nd Army Corps established under the Kingdom of Afghanistan and lasting until the collapse of the Democratic Republic of Afghanistan. The 2nd Army Corps additionally had their own Afghan Spetsnaz battalion, known as the 212th Special Reconnaissance Battalion, in 1980.

The establishment of the corps started when the first commander, Gul Aqa Nahib, and some of his staff were appointed on 1 September 2004. The corps was officially established in Kandahar on 19 September 2004.

Since August 2008, the Corps moved over 90,000 tonnes of supplies using Mi-17 helicopters of the Afghan Air Force. Three of the 205th Corps' four infantry brigades were assessed as capable of conducting independent operations with minimal support from their combat advisors. "One of the brigades recently planned, executed and sustained themselves during a seven-day operation where they drove deep into what is called an enemy sanctuary or enemy safe haven to destroy identified enemy forces," a U.S. advisor said in December 2008. "They were successful leading the operation, with less than 30 mentors and 20 other coalition soldiers, in addition to their 300 ANA ground force," he said. "That was a great example of ANA's capability to lead and conduct their own operations."

The Corps' 3rd Brigade was heavily involved in fighting the Taliban and Al-Qaeda in Helmand province, alongside British troops deployed as part of Operation Herrick.

The Corps began formation with Kalashnikov rifles and miscellaneous civilian vehicles, but under coalition tutelage was reequipped with Western equipment.

The Corps also supported an ANA regional hospital located in Kandahar, adjacent to Kandahar Airfield, dedicated to the security forces. It was a $5 million medical facility that also serves a trauma center.

=== 2021 Taliban offensive ===
In August 2021, the corps was destroyed during the Taliban offensive and in Battle of Kandahar. Since then, the corps have been reportedly reactivated and reformed into the 205th Al Badr Corps as part of the Taliban's Islamic National Army.

== Provisional order of battle ==
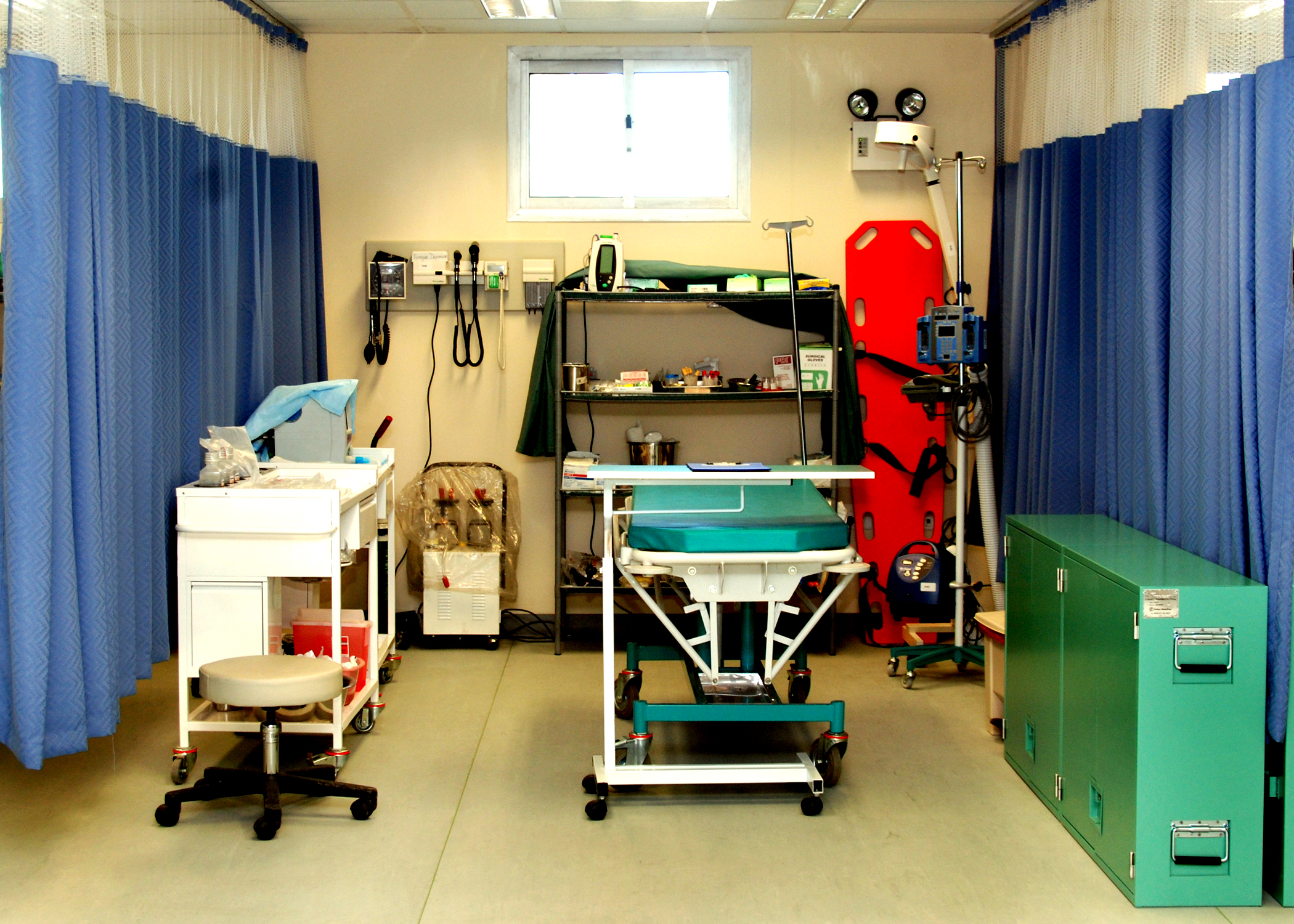
Treatment area inside the Army regional hospital

- Headquarters, Camp Hero, Kandahar
- Commando Battalion
- Regional logistics depot
- 1st Brigade, Camp Hero, Kandahar
- 2nd Brigade, Qalat, Zabul
- 3rd Brigade, FOB Pasab, Zhari District, Kandahar commanded by Brigadier General Murtaza
- 4th Brigade, Multi National Base Tarin Kot, Tarin Khowt, Oruzgan, commanded by Brigadier General Zafar Khan (redesignated brigade of another corps which was transferred into the 205th Corps' area of responsibility)

Each brigade had three infantry battalions, a combat support battalion, some with D-30 howitzers, and a combat service support battalion.
