= Gul Agha Sherzai =

Afghan politician

Gul Agha Sherzai گل آغا شیرزی
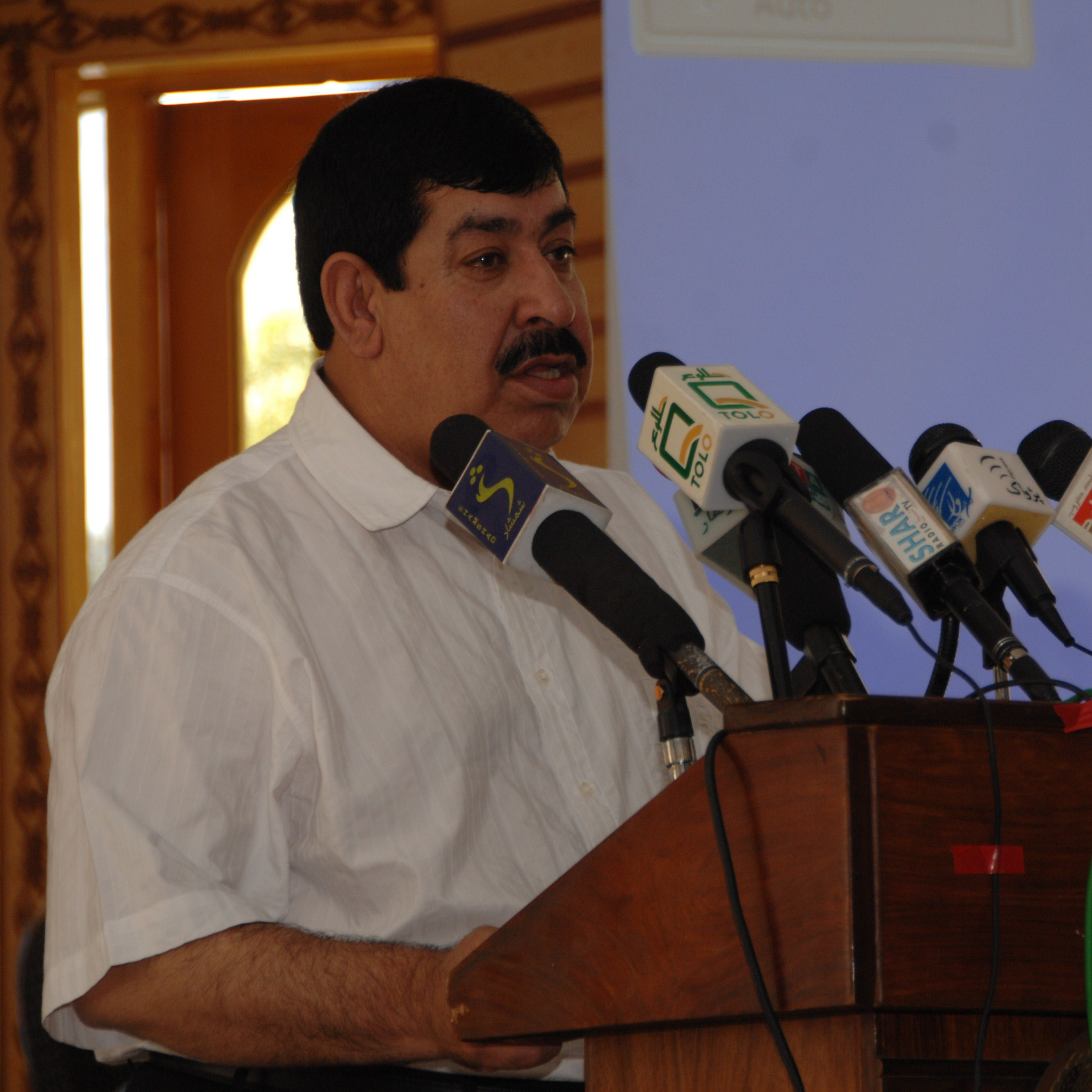
- Sherzai speaking at the Rule of Law Conference for Eastern Afghanistan in October 2009

Governor of Nangarhar Province, Afghanistan
- In office 12 July 2005 – October 2013
- Succeeded by: Maulvi Attaullah Ludin

Minister of Borders and Tribal Affairs of Afghanistan
- In office 25 July 2017 – 15 August 2021
- Succeeded by: Norullah Noori (Taliban government)

Personal details
- Born: 1954 (age 71–72) Kandahar Province, Kingdom of Afghanistan
- Party: Independent
- Profession: Politician, former Mujahideen leader

Gul Agha Sherzai (Pashto: ګل آغا شيرزی; born 1954), also known as Mohammad Shafiq, is a politician and former warlord in Afghanistan. He is a former governor of Nangarhar province in eastern Afghanistan. He previously served as Governor of Kandahar province, in the early 1990s and from 2001 until 2003. In October 2013, Sherzai resigned from his post as governor and formally announced himself as a candidate for Afghanistan's 2014 Presidential Election, and served as the minister of border and tribal affairs until the Taliban captured Afghanistan again in 2021.

== Early years ==
Sherzai was born in 1954 in Kandahar province His father Haji Abdul Latif, proprietor of a small tea shop in Kandahar, rose to become a famous Mujahideen commander. Sherzai took the name Gul Agha when he joined his father in the Mujahideen, who were fighting in the southern Afghanistan area against the Soviet and Afghan government forces.

His father was later murdered and he added Sherzai (Pashto for "son of lion") as his last name. He is an ethnic Pashtun from the Barakzai tribe. His father was locally known as Haji Latif Sagwan, ("Sagwan" is a term used for a "dog fighter") which is a derogatory term used for gamblers, who was a well-known dog fighter in southern Afghanistan. Sherzai would later collaborate with then-Governor of Kandahar, General Nur ul-Haq Ulumi, to stage fake attacks on the Afghan military, resulting in the ISI increasing supplies sent to Sherzai, who would sell them in Kandahar with the blessings of the PDPA government.

After the collapse of the PDPA government in 1992, Sherzai served as Governor of Kandahar. He was known outside of Afghanistan as one of the major warlords until around September 1994 when the Taliban began their conquest in Kandahar. Sherzai resigned from his post as governor and remained hidden until late 2001 in Pakistan.

== The Karzai administration ==
Sherzai's capture of Kandahar in late 2001, with assistance from American special forces and Hamid Karzai, marked the first time territory in southern Afghanistan had been captured from the Taliban forces.

According to Matthieu Aikins, writing in Harper's Magazine Karzai appointed a Mullah Naqib to the Governorship of Kandarhar. Aikins reported that American officials favored Sherzai over Karzai's choice, and encouraged him to oust Mullah Naqib.

In August 2003, Afghan President Karzai decreed that officials could no longer hold both military and civil posts, and replaced Sherzai with Yousef Pashtun as Governor of Kandahar.

=== Political career after Kandahar ===
In 2004, Sherzai was appointed Governor of Nangarhar Province, after a spell as "Special Advisor" to Hamid Karzai.

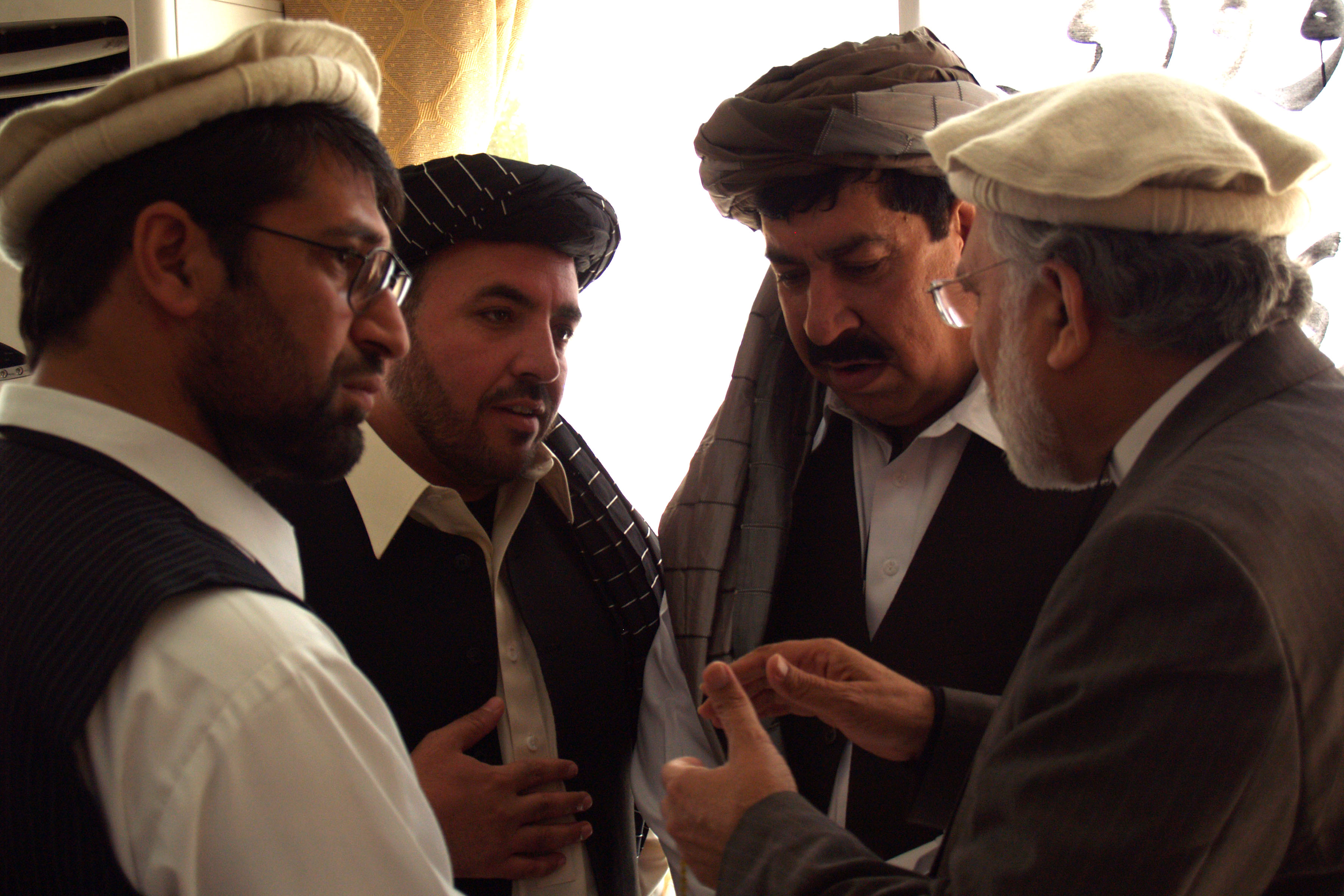
Sherzai speaking in 2009 with the governors of Nuristan, Laghman and Kunar province.

In July 2006, Sherzai narrowly escaped an assassination attempt at a funeral outside Jalalabad. The attempt killed five police officers and wounded several more people, including some children. He opened the newly built highway connecting Jalalabad city with Torkham, which is one of the most popular border towns between Afghanistan and Pakistan. Afghan President Karzai and Pakistan's Prime Minister Shaukat Aziz were also present during the inauguration.

In 2008 he met Barack Obama.

In January 2009, an article by Ahmad Majidyar of the American Enterprise Institute included Sherzai on a list of fifteen possible candidates in the 2009 Afghan Presidential election. In May 2009, he announced that he would not be a candidate. Nevertheless, his name was on an August 2009 ballot, and preliminary results placed him 17th in a field of 38.

Sherzai's brother is Abdul Raziq Sherzai, a commander who captured Kandahar airfield in 2001-02 and was subsequently made the Kandahar wing commander of the Afghan Air Force.

On October 2, 2013, Sherzai resigned from his post as Governor of Nangarhar Province and formally announced himself as a candidate for Afghanistan's 2014 Presidential Election.

Since 2021, Sherzai pledged allegiance to the Taliban government and he had also congratulated their victory in the American War in Afghanistan after they took over Kabul.

Preceded by Mohammad Hasan Rahmani	Governor of Kandahar Province, Afghanistan; 2001–2003	Succeeded by Yousef Pashtun

Preceded by Haji Din Mohammad	Governor of Nangarhar Province, Afghanistan; 2004–2021	Succeeded by Neda Mohammad
