= Yousef Pashtun =

Afghan politician

Yousef Pashtun محمد یوسف پښتون

Senior Adviser Minister to the President on Construction, Mines, Water & Energy
- Incumbent
- Assumed office January 2010
- Preceded by: Eng. Tawab Asifi

Minister of Urban Development & Housing
- In office January 2005 – December 2009
- Lieutenant: Sayed Shareef Hussaini
- Preceded by: Gul Agha Sherzai
- Succeeded by: Sultan Hussain Hissary

Governor of Kandahar
- In office August 2003 – December 2004
- Lieutenant: Mohammad Anass
- Preceded by: Gul Agha Sherzai
- Succeeded by: Asadullah Khalid

Minister of Urban Development
- In office April 2002 – August 2003
- Lieutenant: Engineer Nasir Sabiri
- Preceded by: Abdul Qadir
- Succeeded by: Gul Agha Sherzai

Personal details
- Born: 15 November 1946 (age 79) Kandahar, Kingdom of Afghanistan
- Party: Independent
- Spouse: Qamar Angaar Pashtun
- Education: M.Arch, M.U.P.
- Alma mater: American University of Beirut
- Profession: Architect / Urban Planner

Mohammad Yousef Pashtun (Pashto: یوسف پښتون) is an Afghan technocrat and politician. He served as Minister of Urban Development and Housing for two terms (2002–2003, 2005–2010) and as Governor of Kandahar province in 2003, replacing Gul Agha Sherzai under President Hamid Karzai's administration. In 2010, he was appointed as Senior Adviser to President Karzai on Construction, Mines, Water & Energy. In 2014, minister Pashtun continued to serve as Senior Adviser to President Ashraf Ghani. Yِousef Pashtun is also chairing the Kabul New City Development Authority Board.

== Biography ==
Yousef Pashtun, an ethnic Pashtun of the Barakzai tribe, was born in the city of Kandahar. He was born to one of the elite families of Kandahar on November 15, 1946. His grandfather, General Mohammad Nabi Khan was the Army Chief of Southern Zone of Afghanistan during the Third Afghan - Anglo War under the command of King Amanullah Khan. His father, Brigadier Mohammad Ghani Khan, served as Corps Commander of Eastern and afterwards Northern Zone of Afghanistan. His maternal grandfather Haji Gul Muhammad Khan was an active politician and key figure in Southern Afghanistan's political leadership. Pashtun graduated from Ahmad Shah Baba High School in 1965. He began studying engineering at Kabul University, and being ranked in top 10 of Afghanistan's Higher Secondary Board Exam, he soon received a USAID/Kabul University scholarship to attend American University of Beirut in Lebanon, where Pashtun earned a bachelor's degree in Architecture, and two master's degrees, one in Architecture (1973) and Urban Design and Planning (1977).

After his Masters, he worked in "Dar-ul-Handasa Design & Construction Company" in the Middle East. Under this company he worked on the master plans of Dubai and Ras-al-Khaima cities. After his return to Afghanistan he worked as a lecturer in Engineering Faculty of Kabul University.

=== During Soviet invasion ===
After the Soviet invasion, Yousef Pashtun escaped three times from Soviet troops and finally had to leave Afghanistan, and he took refuge to Pakistan. In Pakistan he started helping the Afghans fighting against Soviet troops by providing humanitarian aid. He started to provide humanitarian aid to the Mujahideen and also founded a Hospital for free treatment of Afghans affected by the war. He worked a lot to support the Afghans in their resistance against Soviet occupation. During the war against Soviet invasion he formed strong ties with United Nations and then he founded several other NGOs like Mercy Corps International (MCI) for the agricultural development of Afghanistan, Demining Agency for Afghanistan (DAFA) and Rehabilitating Infrastructure for Rural Afghanistan (RIFRA) for the development of Afghanistan.

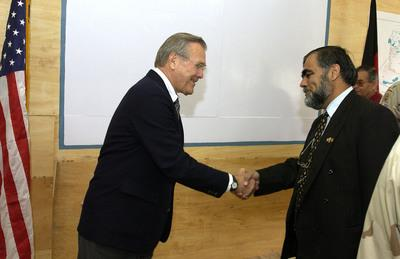
Kandahar Governor Yousef Pashtun with US Secretary of Defense Donald Rumsfeld, Kandahar Airbase – 2003

=== Taliban Era ===
After the Soviet withdrawal he was proposed so many posts in the Afghan Mujahideen's Government but he refused and continued with his task of reinstating the Former King of Afghanistan Mohammad Zahir Shah. He lived in exile in Quetta, in Pakistan where he worked to reinstate the previous king of Afghanistan, Zahir Shah. During exile in Quetta, Yousef Pashtun along with some other Prominent Afghan Political figures like Abdul Ahad Karzai(father of Hamid Karzai), Hamid Karzai, Gul Agha Sherzai and other figures worked to reinstate the former Afghan king. He has also worked in the executive committee of Loya Jirga under the command of Mohammad Zahir Shah (The father of the Nation and former King of Afghanistan).

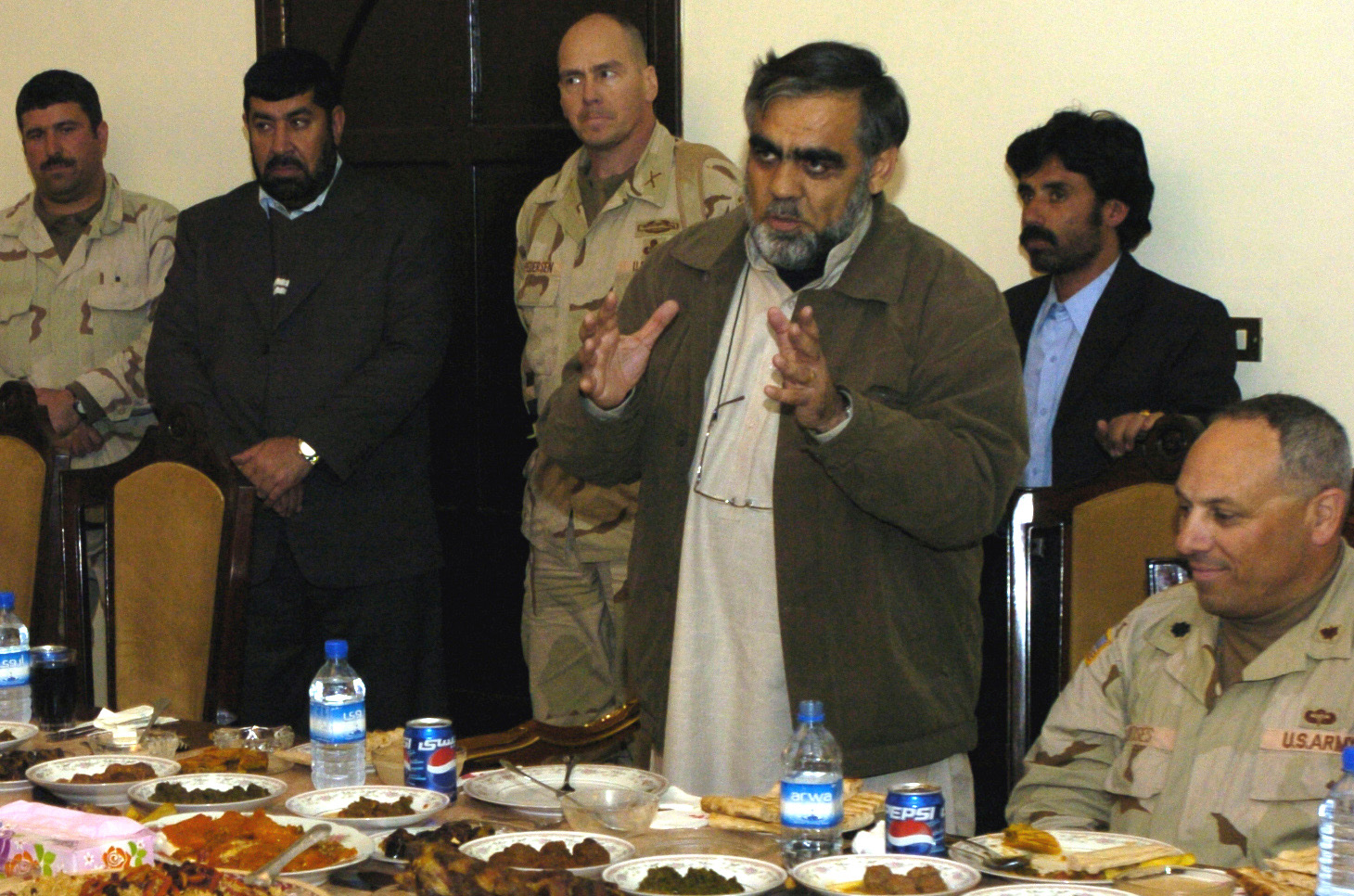
Governor Yousef Pashtun briefing US Army Joint Task Force with Gul Agha Sherzai in Kandahar, 2003.

=== After the Fall of Taliban ===
During U.S. Invasion over Taliban Government in 2001, Yousef Pashtun provided assistance to the American special forces, as a liaison between the U.S. forces and the armed groups led by Gul Agha Sherzai, as he was trusted by both sides. They attacked the Southern Zone and captured Kandahar city within a week. When Gul Agha Sherzai was announced as Governor of Kandahar in January 2002, Pashtun was appointed as the Executive coordinator of Kandahar province to reinstate the local Government, and for better coordination of the foreign aid.

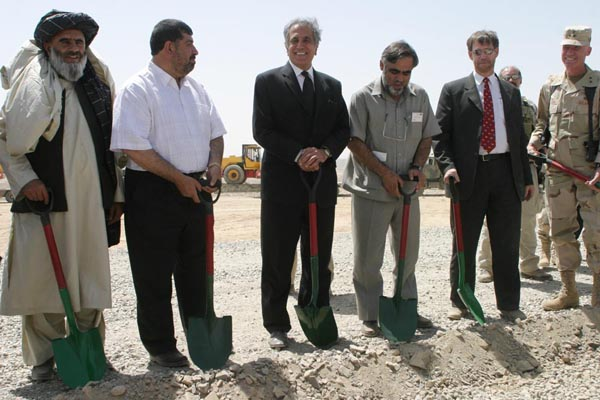
Pashtun in the inaugurating ceremony to start road construction in southern Afghanistan with Gul Agha Sherzai, Zalmay Khalilzad and Oruzgan Province Governor.

=== Kandahar Governor ===
Karzai's government ruled that officials could not hold military and civil posts simultaneously, hence Hamid Karzai replaced Gul Agha Sherzai as the Governor of Kandahar and appointed Yousef Pashtun on 15 August 2003. Sherzai transferred the power peacefully as Pashtun was much close to him and they were from the same Barakzai tribe. Yousef Pashtun was seen as central government loyalist and more effective administrator, Afghan officials said. International Community was also interested to work with him for the rehabilitation of Kandahar as he was an experienced Urban plan with technical expertise. Yousef Pashtun tried to enhance the development projects in Kandahar which created more job opportunities for the locals, leading to the stabilization of the region. He was successful so far in his goals, to achieve development and peace in the province. As he was not known as a Tribal leader, but as an intellectual, hence he was able to unite the tribes efficiently. During his term, he reduced the poppy cultivation by 40% in the province. Yousef Pashtun created special unit for coordinating foreign aid to be channeled through one channel and spent on prioritized projects. He also worked on uniting the Governors of Southern Afghanistan (Kandahar, Helmand, Oruzgan, Zabul and Nimroz) to cooperate with each other. He worked on Kandahar city's new master plan, rehabilitation of city roads and upgrading the local Municipality System in the city.

=== Minister of Urban Development ===
In 2002, he was appointed Minister of Urban Development and Housing under the Transitional Government, and a year later, was appointed Governor of Kandahar Province. In 2004 after the start of Republic Government of Afghanistan, he returned to Kabul resuming his role as Minister of Urban Development and Housing. In 2006 he got vote of confidence from the Parliament to resume his post as the Minister of Urban Development. As a Minister of Urban Development, he established an Independent Board for the Development of Kabul New City. The Board brings together key stakeholders, including relevant government agencies, as well as urban specialists and economists. The board prepared a master plan for the city in the context of Greater Kabul. The master plan and its implementation strategy for 2025 were endorsed by the Afghan Cabinet in early 2009. Soon, as a top priority, the initiative turned into one of the biggest commercially viable national development project of the country, expected to be led by the private sector. During his term, he was able to complete the Strategic expansion plans for all major cities of Afghanistan which counts up to 20 cities.

Minister Yousef Pashtun played the leading role in the rehabilitation of Current Parliament of Afghanistan. He is actively leading the Design and Construction of New Parliament of Afghanistan to be built by 2015.

=== Senior Adviser Minister to the President of Afghanistan on Construction, Mines, Water & Energy ===
In the second term of Hamid Karzai as the President of Afghanistan, he resigned from Urban Development ministry. Later, Karzai was appointed him as the Senior Adviser Minister to the President of Afghanistan on Construction, Mines, Water & Energy. After 2014 Presidential elections, newly elected President Mohammad Ashraf Ghani reappointed him. Pashtun leads different National Technical Committees for Construction, Urban Development, Public Works, Mines, Transportation, Water & Energy. He currently chairs Independent Board of Kabul New City Development.

Minister Pashtun was also a prominent candidate for the post of Director General, UN-Habitat representing South Asian Countries in 2010.

=== Public Image ===
Pashtun is much known for his strict fight against land mafia when he was Minister of Urban Development as well as Senior Adviser to the President. He is currently Head of the committee for counter land grabbing and land mafia. He got much public acclaim when he revealed the name of Marshal Qaseem Fahim, the then Vice President of Afghanistan as the leader of land mafia and involved in several huge land grabbing cases in Afghanistan on National Television. This interview portrayed his image as a Politician who is much blunt and not involved in political deals in Afghanistan. Some political analysts highlights his transfer from Minister to Senior Adviser to president as a move to keep him more involved in this fight against land mafia. Unlike Cabinet minister who is answerable to both houses of Parliament, Vice Presidents and other Government authorities, as Adviser of President he can perform his job without any interruption from Members of Parliaments or any other political group. He is also known as one of the most influential Adviser to President Karzai, especially on technical issues.

=== Personal life ===
Yousef Pashtun married Qamar Angaar, daughter of Late Faiz Mohammad Angaar. Faiz Mohammad Angaar was a renowned Afghan political activist, reformist and Editor-in-Chief of local weekly newspaper "Angaar" (Burning Embers). Minister Pashtun is father of two sons and three daughters. He was born in a large family of 18 siblings. He has fluency in Pashto, Dari, English, Urdu, Arabic and Armenian languages.

=== Publications & Studies ===
No.	Publication
1.	Architectural Trends in Beirut during 1880–1970, 1973 - American University of Beirut.
2.	Survey and preliminary planning for 23 towns in the River states, Nigeria.
3.	Master Plan for the town of Okrika, Nigeria.
4.	Master Plan for the town of Ogbia, Nigeria.
5.	Master Plan for the town of Omuku, Nigeria.
6.	Master Plan for the town of Okehi, River states, Nigeria.
7.	Master Plan survey and study for the city of Kuduna, Nigeria.
8.	Master plan for Ras-ul-Khima, United Arab Emirates.
9.	Master Plan for Manama, Bahrain.
10.	Master Plan for the town of Wafra, Kuwait.
11.	Master Plan and first Phase Design for Yarmuk University, Cross, Jordan.
12.	Preliminary study Master Plan for Medina Munawara, Saudi Arabia.
13.	Master Plan for one million scale city of Kandahar, Afghanistan.
14.	Statistical Survey of Afghan population at the district level, refugees and settled, coauthor, Dr. Tom Eimy, USAID-Pakistan.

=== Paper Studies ===
No.	Paper
1.	The Effects of Armed Conflict and Migration on Social fabrics, University London.
2.	The effects of social disintegration on Urban Development in Afghanistan.
3.	Informal settlements are the major challenge to Urban development.
4.	Urban Planning through public participation in Afghanistan.
5.	Water Supply and Sanitation as the status of developed city in Afghanistan.
6.	Housing and poverty in Afghanistan.
7.	Well Serviced cities are the machines of developing economy underdeveloped.
8.	Program for the settlement of 1.5 million Afghan Nomads.
9.	Program for the 85 townships for the settlement of returning 6 million Afghan refugees.
10.	Proposal for the development of Basic Urban Services in 40 Afghan cities and townships.
11.	Mortgage Policy and Program for Housing in Afghanistan.

=== Memberships ===
No.	Membership
1.	Member of Association of Lebanese Architects and Planner ( 1975 )
2.	Member of the Afghan association of Architects and Engineers.
3.	Chairman SWABAC ( South-West Afghanistan all NGO coordination), 1988–1991

=== Awards ===
No.	Award
1.	Best Design awards, Yarmuk University, Jordan, 1977
2.	South-West Afghanistan Development Plan, Achievement award, US department of state.
3.	Best Program for Urban Up-grading; Awards of the Municipality of Lima, Peru, 2008.
4.	UNHABITAT, Best achievement in Urban Development Award, 2008.

Preceded by Gul Agha Sherzai	Governor of Kandahar Province, Afghanistan; 2003–2004	Succeeded by Asadullah Khalid
Preceded by Abdul Qadir	Minister of Urban Development and Housing, Afghanistan; 2004–Present	Succeeded by Incumbent
