= Abdul Raziq Achakzai =

Afghan police chief (1979–2018)

- عبدالرازق اڅکزی
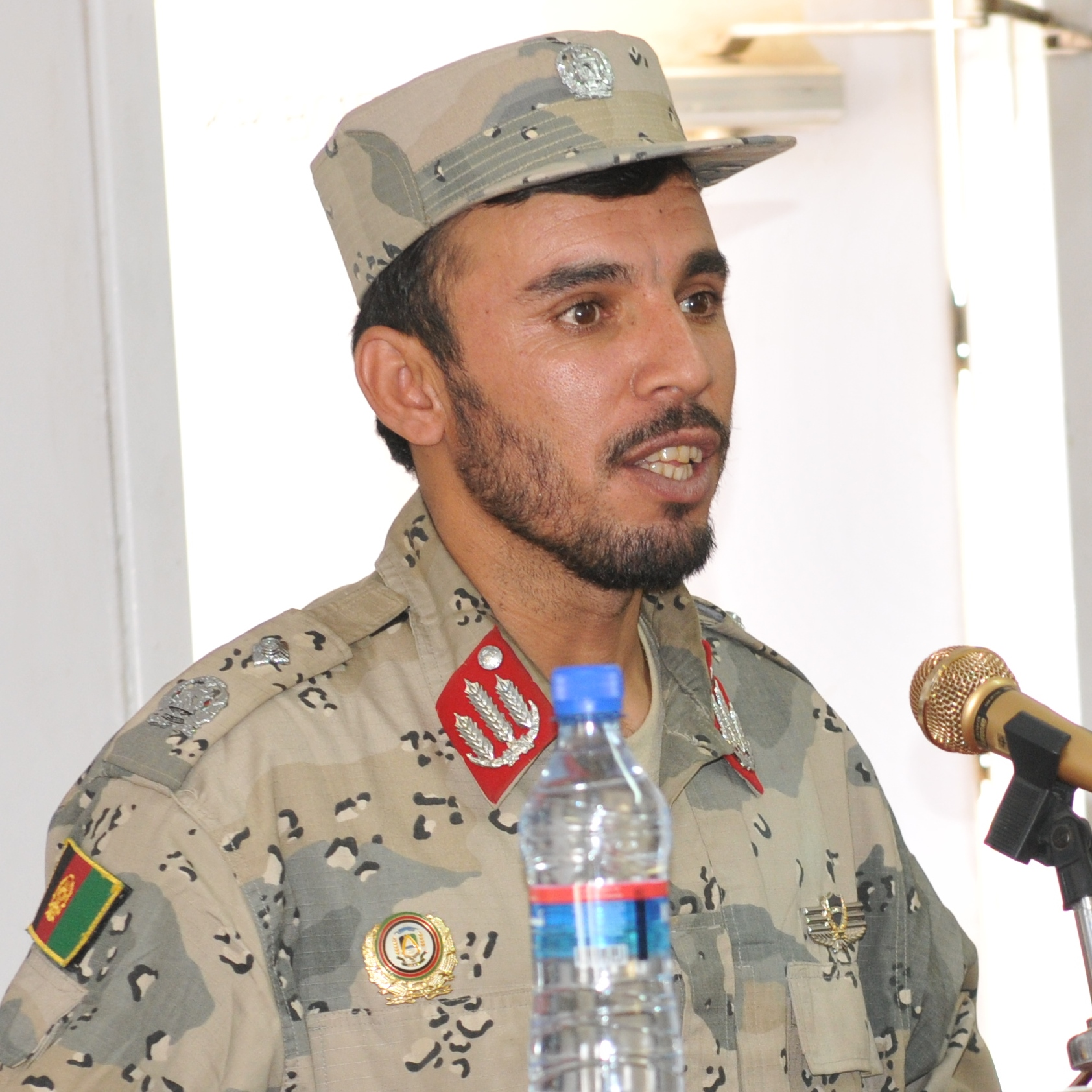
- Achakzai in 2012
- Born: Abdul Raziq; 1979; Spin Boldak, Afghanistan
- Died: October 18, 2018 (aged 39); Kandahar, Afghanistan
- Spouse: 3
- Children: 14
- Military career
- Allegiance: Islamic Republic of Afghanistan
- Branch: Afghan Border Police
- Service years: 2002–2018
- Rank: Lieutenant general
- Conflicts: War in Afghanistan

Abdul Raziq Achakzai, also known as General Raziq, (Pashto: عبدالرازق اڅکزی; Persian/Dari: عبدالرازق اچکزی; 1979 – October 18, 2018) was the chief of police for Kandahar Province. Many Afghans regarded him as a national hero while others viewed him simply as a warlord. In late 2001, Achakzai became a member of Gul Agha Sherzai's forces whom the Taliban had surrendered to after the U.S. invasion of Afghanistan. Achakzai was considered to be one of the most powerful security officials in Afghanistan for the last few years of his life.

After surviving several assassination attempts over the years, Achakzai was killed in an insider attack by a bodyguard of the provincial governor, who opened fire on him and other security officials after a meeting with the U.S. Army General Scott Miller at the governor's compound in Kandahar. Achakzai was succeeded by his brother, Tadeen Khan, who had no military-related experience. Tadeen's nomination was a result of heavy pressure from powerful tribal elders who persuaded the Afghan government to overlook his lack of experience and training.

== Early years ==
Abdul Raziq was born in 1979 in the Spin Boldak area of Kandahar Province in Afghanistan. He was a member of the Adozai sub-tribe of Achakzai and never received formal education. He and his family fled to Balochistan, Pakistan after the Taliban took control of Afghanistan in 1994.

The Taliban had killed his father and uncle when they seized control of Spin Boldak, hanging Raziq's uncle from a tank barrel. The Taliban who had killed Raziq's father and uncle were members of the rival Noorzai tribe, causing him to later seek revenge against the Noorzai and the Taliban. He returned to Afghanistan in the fall of 2001 and became a member of fighters loyal to Gul Agha Sherzai.

Achakzai is thought to have received annual kickbacks from customs revenues exacted at border crossings. He became extremely wealthy as a result of his control over the province and a major border thoroughfare. He also spent time in Dubai and was heavily involved in horse trading. He also had businesses abroad.

Following his death, the Afghan government began construction of a large mausoleum dedicated to Achakzai, which is near the Khirka Sharif complex and the Eidgha Gate on the main Kabul–Kandahar Highway. It was walled off prior to its completion after the resurgence of the Taliban.

== Military career ==
In November 2001, Achakzai joined anti-Taliban forces that were led by Sherzai and Fida Mohammad. Instead of fighting, a peaceful transition of power took place in Kandahar between the Taliban and the other group. Although he was unknown in 2001, he gradually rose to command the Afghan Border Police on Afghanistan's border between Kandahar and Pakistan's Balochistan Province.

== Personal life ==
Achakzai had three wives and 14 children.

== Human rights abuses ==
Achakzai was alleged to have committed numerous human rights violations including extrajudicial killings, forced disappearances, and torture in the Kandahar province. In 2017, the United Nations Committee on Torture wanted Achakzai to be prosecuted for allegations of torture and enforced disappearances. The committee also stated that Achakzai was 'operating secret detention centers' where people were being tortured. Achakzai denied all the allegations made against him by the U.N. committee.

Apart from international human rights organizations, residents of Kandahar also accused him of being involved in human rights violations. Some tribal elders and provincial legislators expressed relief over his death. One legislator said that Kandahar province became less violent after his death.

Former Afghan President Hamid Karzai and other powerful allies had refused to prosecute Achakzai for many years alleging a lack of credible evidence of crime.

In August 2011, the U.S. military banned the transfer of detainees to Afghan authorities in Kandahar. The military stated that they are investigating reports regarding abuse of prisoners by provincial police chiefs as they have received "credible allegations" that detainees are being mistreated while in the custody of Achakzai. Military spokesman, Col. Gary Kolb, said that the U.S. will not hand over detainees to Afghan officials until they are sure that there are no issues.

An investigation of Afghan government documents and "hidden ledgers" by the New York Times published in May 2024 indicated that officers in the Achakzai police force "abducted hundreds, if not thousands" of Afghans to be "killed or tortured" in Achakzai's "secret jails". Using only evidence corroborated by at least two people, (often including eyewitnesses), the Times tallied "368 cases of forced disappearances" and dozens of extrajudicial killings attributed to Achakzai's forces. According to the Times, resentment against Achakzai's abuse of power among the local population in Kandahar was so great that it helped turn them against the Afghan government and in favor of the Taliban.

== Alleged drug smuggling and corruption ==
Achakzai was also accused of being involved in drug smuggling and corruption cases. American officials have acknowledged in front of the members of U.S. Congress that Achakzai had made millions by collecting major cuts from all the trucks that pass through the Spin Boldak crossing.

Similarly Canadian Brig.Gen. Jonathan Vance, former commander of NATO-led forces, acknowledged that Achakzai was directly involved in drug smuggling.

Matthieu Aikins, in his investigative story in Harper's Magazine, stated that Achakzai made $5–6 million every month through drug smuggling.

In 2010, the head of Afghan customs revenue said that every year the Afghan government is receiving only a 'fifth of what the government should collect' in customs revenue from the Spin Boldak crossing. In 2015, a newspaper run by a group of Hazaras also reported that the Afghan government was only receiving 1/5th of what it should be receiving from the customs border which was under the control of Abdul Raziq. Raziq maintained full control of the Spin Boldak crossing until his death.

== See also ==
- Afghan National Police
