= Juma Al Kaabi =

Emirati Ambassador to Afghanistan (1966–2017)

United Arab Emirates Ambassador to Afghanistan
- In office July 28, 2016 – January 10, 2017
- President: Khalifa bin Zayed
- Preceded by: Yousef Saif Khamis Al Ali
- Succeeded by: Essa Salem Al Dhaheri

Personal details
- Born: Juma Mohammed Abdullah Al Kaabi; 1966 Al Qor, Ras Al Khaimah, United Arab Emirates
- Died: February 15, 2017 (aged 50–51) France
- Cause of death: Injuries from a bombing attack suspected by Taliban
- Resting place: Al Qor, Ras Al Khaimah, UAE
- Profession: Diplomat

Juma Mohammed Al Kaabi (Arabic: جمعة محمد الكعبي; 1966 – February 15, 2017) was an Emirati career diplomat who served as the United Arab Emirates Ambassador to Afghanistan from July 28, 2016 to January 10, 2017. Al Kaabi died from injuries sustained in the 10 January 2017 Afghanistan bombings while he was on a humanitarian mission to open an orphanage in Kandahar, Afghanistan.

== Early life and education ==
Al Kaabi was born in 1966 in the village of Wadi Al Qor in Ras Al Khaimah, United Arab Emirates. He was the eldest of his siblings. He has 2 brothers and 6 sisters. His father died while he was 18 years old and he became the primary caretaker of his family.

== Career ==
After finishing high school, he joined the United Arab Emirates Armed Forces. He then joined the UAE Ministry of Foreign Affairs for 8 years before being appointed on July 28, 2016 as the UAE Ambassador to Afghanistan.

== Death ==
On January 10, 2017 Al Kaabi was on a humanitarian mission to Kandahar province, Afghanistan, to lay the foundation stone of an orphanage sponsored by the UAE government. A bombing occurred while he was at a dinner visit at the Kandahar governor's house, Humayun Azizi. A member of the Kandahar governor’s staff – likely a cook – smuggled explosives hidden in food to the compound. Authorities said the bomb was planted in a sofa and exploded when Ambassador Juma Al Kaabi and Kandahar Governor Humayun Azizi had stepped out of the room. A total of 13 people were killed and 18 were injured in the explosion among them Al Kaabi and Azizi. 5 UAE diplomats were killed in the attack. The attack was one of three attacks that occurred on the same date. Taliban claimed responsibility for the other two attacks, but denied responsibility for the attack on the UAE diplomatic mission.

Al Kaabi was evacuated to Abu Dhabi by a military plane for treatment of his injuries. He was then transferred for medical treatment to a specialized hospital in France. On February 15, 2017, the Ministry of Presidential Affairs announced that Al Kaabi had died due to his injuries.

According to Emirati security officials, the bomb was a sophisticated device used in an assassination attempt and had three compartments, which exploded one after the other ensuring that even late-arriving rescuers were hit by the blasts.

== Personal life ==
Al Kaabi was married and had 3 daughters, 2 sons, and 2 grandchildren.

== See also ==
- Afghanistan–United Arab Emirates relations
