= List of governors of Nangarhar =

This is a list of the governors of the province of Nangarhar, Afghanistan.

== Governors of Nangarhar Province ==
| Governor | Period | Extra | Note |
|---|---|---|---|
| Abdul Qadir | 2001; July 2002 | | |
| Din Mohammad | Jul 2002; 2004 | | |
| Gul Agha Sherzai | 7 July 2005; October 2013 | | |
| Attaullah Lodin | 14 November 2013; 21 March 2015 | | |
| Salim Khan Kunduzi | 19 May 2015; 2 October 2016 | | |
| Mohammad Gulab Mangal | 22 October 2016; 13 May 2018 | | |
| Hayatullah Hayat | 14 May 2018; 2 February 2019 | | |
| Shah Mahmood Miakhel | 4 February 2019; 23 August 2020 | | |
| Ziaulhaq Amarkhil | 23 August 2020; 24 August 2021 | | |
| Neda Mohammad Nadeem | 24 August 2021; 20 September 2021 | | |
| Daud Muzamil | 21 September 2021 late 2022 | | |
| Hajji Gul Mohammad | late 2022 present | | |

== See also ==
- List of Afghanistan governors
