= Hayatullah Hayat =

Afghan politician

- حيات الله حيات
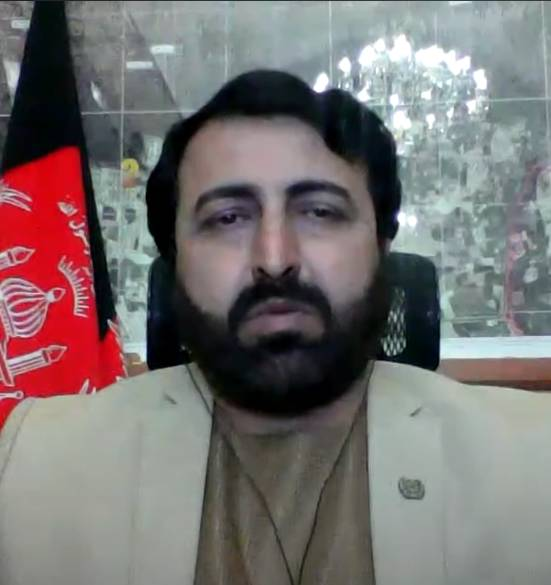
- Hayat in 2020

Governor of Kandahar Province
- In office 4 February 2019 – 3 January 2021
- Preceded by: Zalmai Wesa
- Succeeded by: Rohullah Khanzada

Governor of Nangarhar
- In office 15 May 2018 – 4 February 2019
- Preceded by: Mohammad Gulab Mangal
- Succeeded by: Shah Mahmood Miakhel

Personal details
- Born: 1974 (age 51–52) Khogyani District, Nangarhar Province

Hayatullah Hayat (Pashto: حيات الله حيات; born 1974) is a politician in Afghanistan and former Interior Minister. He previously served as Governor of Wardak, Helmand, Nangarhar and Kandahar provinces, and also as the Minister of Rural Rehabilitation and Development. Hayat was appointed as Minister of Interior in March 2021, replacing Masood Andrabi. He served as Minister of Interior Affairs until 19 June 2021.
