= Badozai =

Pashtun tribe

The Badozai (Pashto: بادوزۍ) is a Pashtun tribe, found generally in Pakistan. It is currently located in Balochistan mainly. The Badozai Tribe has its roots linking it with the Arabs known Bidunes” those who travelled, places with their camels, originating from today’s Middle east Saudi Arabia.

== History ==
The Badozai belong to a Pashtun tribe that originally migrated from Kandahar, Afghanistan centuries ago.

In the 1885 The cyclopædia of India and of eastern and southern Asia, the author cited one "MacGregor", describing the Badozai:

...a tribe inhabiting the Past-i-Koh, to the west of Sib, in the Kohistan of Baluchistan, Muzaffargarh and Multan.

== Economic activity ==
The main economic sector the Badozai tribe belongs to is agriculture.
