= Muhammad Hassan =

Muhammad Hassan may refer to:

- Muhammad Hassan (Brunei) (reign 1582–1598), ninth Sultan of Brunei
- Muhammad Hassan (Taliban), an alleged leader in the Taliban's Quetta Shura
- Muhammad Hassan (wrestler) (born 1980), American professional wrestler born Marc Copani
- Muhammad Nurridzuan Abu Hassan (born 1992), Malaysian footballer
- Muhammad Hasan, Afghan prince

== See also ==
- Mohamad Hasan (politician) (born 1956), Malaysian politician
- Mohamed H.A. Hassan (born 1947), Sudanese scientist
- Mohammad Hasan (disambiguation)
- Mohammed Hassan (disambiguation)
