= Panjpai =

Durrani Pashtun tribal confederation

The Panjpai (Pashto: پنجپاي) are a Durrani Pashtun tribal confederation found primarily in southern Afghanistan.

The confederation's tribes are generally given as the Alizai, Ishakzai and Nurzai.
