= Humayun Azizi =

Afghan politician

Humayun Azizi ھمایون عزیزی

Governor of Kandahar Province
- In office 27 April 2015 – 20 May 2017
- Preceded by: Toryalai Wesa
- Succeeded by: Zalmai Wesa

Afghanistan Ambassador to Netherlands
- In office 2017–2020

Personal details
- Born: 1974 (age 51–52) Herat, Afghanistan
- Party: Independent
- Children: 4
- Education: University of France
- Profession: Physician, diplomat

Humayun Azizi (Pashto: ھمایون عزیزی) is an Afghan physician who served as governor of Kandahar Province, Afghanistan, from April 2015 until 2017. He has previously been state minister for parliamentary affairs. He has been Afghanistan's Ambassador to the Netherlands from 2017 to 2020 and currently the Afghan ambassador to France since 2020.

== Career ==
Humayun Azizi is a Pashtun from the Herat Province. He obtained his PhD in medicine from the Kabul Medical University. He was a doctor in a Herati hospital from 2000 to 2003. A general surgeon, he soon became head of the Burns Unit at Herat Zone Hospital in 2002. Alongside his profession, he was also interested and active in social and political affairs of Afghanistan. In 2005 Azizi was elected as member of Provincial Council of Herat and chaired the council for 4 years. In 2004 Azizi resumed further studies in plastic surgery in France and received his certificate in 2009.

Humayun Azizi has been supporting cultural and civil society organizations in Herat province. In 2009, he established Afghanistan Islamic Civil Partnership assembly, and he is still running the assembly in order to create opportunities for Afghan youth and other civil organizations in the country. He was appointed Minister of State for Parliamentary Affairs of the Islamic Republic of Afghanistan in 2010. Moreover, Azizi was a member of regional Peace Loya Jirga, Peace Consultative Jirga and Traditional Loya Jirga, and was appointed as a member of Preparation Committee of Traditional Loya Jirga by president Hamid Karzai in 2011. He is also an active member of the National Security Council of Afghanistan. In April 2015, president Ashraf Ghani appointed Azizi the provincial governor for the southern Kandahar Province of Afghanistan.

== Assassination attempt ==
On January 11, 2017, Azizi was injured in an explosion at the governor's compound. He was hosting a welcome dinner to an Emirati diplomatic mission who were on a humanitarian mission to open an orphanage in Kandahar. A total of 13 people were killed, among them 5 Emirati diplomats, and 18 were injured in the explosion, including Azizi and the United Arab Emirates Ambassador to Afghanistan Juma Al Kaabi. His subsequent hospitalization lasted 2 months.
