= Neda Mohammad Nadeem =

Police Chief of Nangarhar province

Mullah Neda Mohammad Nadeem ندا محمد ندیم
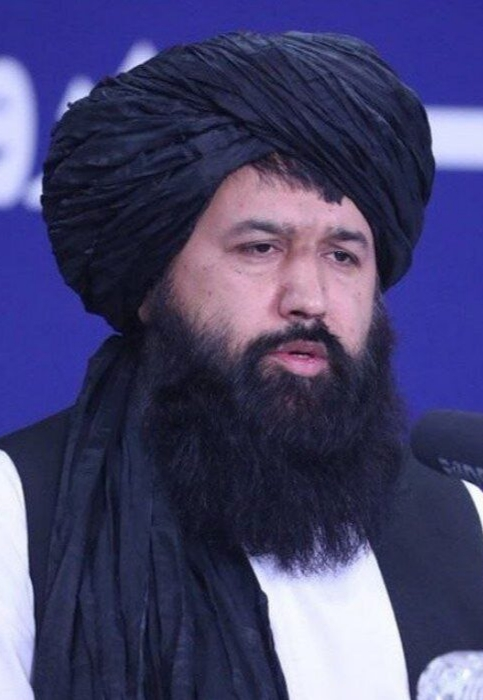

Minister of Higher Education
- Incumbent
- Assumed office 18 October 2022 (Note: Acting: 18 October 2022 – 15 August 2025)
- President: Hibatullah Akhundzada
- Prime Minister: Hassan Akhund
- Preceded by: Abdul Baqi Haqqani

Police Chief of Nangarhar
- In office 20 September 2021 – 18 October 2022
- President: Hibatullah Akhundzada
- Prime Minister: Hassan Akhund

Governor of Nangarhar
- In office 15 August 2021 – 20 September 2021
- President: Hibatullah Akhundzada
- Succeeded by: Daud Muzamil

Personal details
- Born: 17 November 1978 (age 47) Kandahar Province, Democratic Republic of Afghanistan
- Profession: Politician; Military Commander

Neda Mohammad Nadeem (Pashto: ندا محمد ندیم; born 17 November 1978) is a politician in Afghanistan and a member of the Taliban. He is serving as the acting Minister of Higher Education since October 2022. Previously, he held a position as Police Chief of the Nangarhar province since September 2021. Nadeem also served as Governor of Nangarhar province from August 2021 to 20 September 2021 and was replaced by Daud Muzamil.

== Early life and career ==
Born in Kandahar on 17 November 1978, Nadeem graduated from religious madrasa. He joined the Taliban in an unknown year. Between 2011 and 2013, he served in several positions, such as head of the Recruitment and Guidance Department, Taliban security chief and governor in Nangarhar, governor of Kabul, a member of the Taliban Red Crescent Committee, deputy of Taliban Administrative Intelligence, and military commander in the Northwest Zone. The mass killing of the Hazaras in Mirza Olang village in Sayyad district of Sari Pul province is linked to his forces under his command.

== International Sanctions ==
On March 7, 2023, Neda Mohammad Nadeem was sanctioned by the EU for contributing to continued violations of women's rights in Afghanistan, citing his role as the Acting Minister for Higher Education in the Taliban government, which issued decrees banning women from receiving higher education across Afghanistan. He was also sanctioned on similar grounds by Australia in 2025. On October 5, 2026, citing treatment of women by the Taliban, the ICC unsealed arrest warrants for Nadeem.
