= Rahmatullah Raufi =

Afghan politician

Lt General Rahmatullah Raufi (born 1946 in Wardak Province, Afghanistan) is a former governor of Kandahar from August 2008 until he was fired on December 4, 2008 for unknown reasons. Before that he was a senior military commander of the Afghan National Army presently commanding the 205th Corps, which is responsible for Afghanistan's restive southern provinces. He was the main Afghan commander of government forces in Operation Mountain Thrust.

He was replaced by Afghan-Canadian academic Tooryalai Wesa.

Preceded by Asadullah Khalid	Governor of Kandahar Province, Afghanistan; August 2008– December 2008	Succeeded by Tooryalai Wesa
