= WESA =

WESA may refer to:

- WESA (FM), public radio station based in Pittsburgh, Pennsylvania
- WFGI (AM), the radio station that was previously known as WESA in Charleroi, Pennsylvania
- Wapeneienaars van Suid-Afrika, Gun Owners of South Africa
- World Esports Association
- Wills, Estates And Succession Act of British Columbia

== See also ==
- Wesa, Pashto surname
