= Toryalai Wesa =

Politician in Afghanistan

Tooryalai Wesa توريالی ویسا
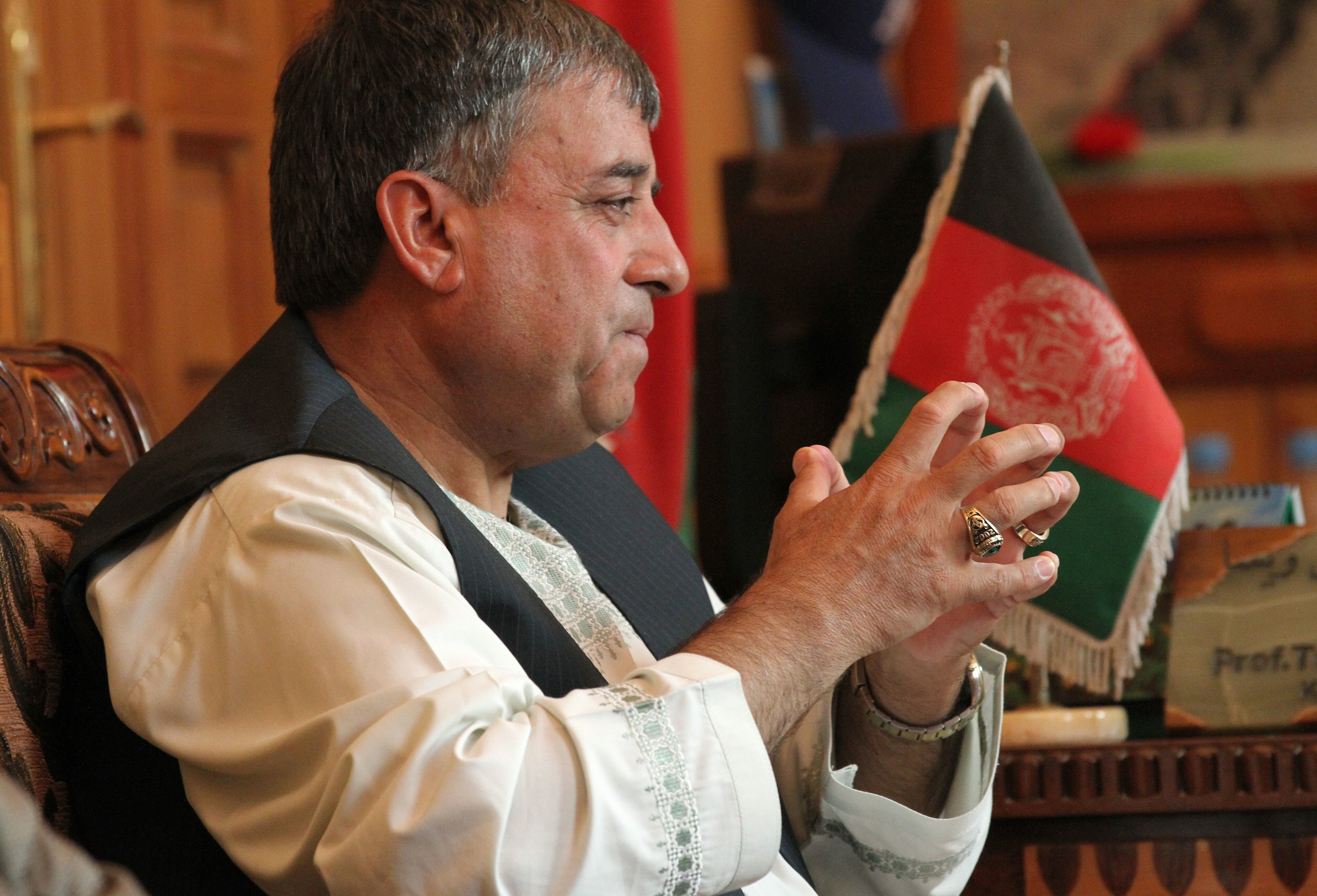
- Wesa at the governor's house in Kandahar (April 2012)

Governor of Kandahar Province
- In office 19 December 2008 – 26 April 2015
- Preceded by: Rahmatullah Raufi
- Succeeded by: Humayoon Azizi

Personal details
- Born: c. 1949 (age 76–77) Kandahar Province, Afghanistan
- Spouse: Rangina

Tooryalai Wesa (Pashto: توريالی ویسا; born c. 1949) is a politician in Afghanistan. He was Governor of Kandahar Province from December 2008 to 2014.

== Early years ==
Wesa was born in a village near Kandahar in southern Afghanistan. He is an ethnic Pashtun, possibly from the Mohammadzai branch of Barakzai tribe.

After securing his BS in Agricultural Economics and Extension from the Faculty of Agriculture at Kabul University in 1973, he pursued his MS at the Department of Agricultural Economics and Extension at the Faculty of Agricultural Sciences at American University of Beirut in Lebanon. Due to the start of the Lebanese Civil War, he travelled to the United States where he studied at the University of Nebraska–Lincoln. He received his MS in 1977 before returning to Afghanistan.

Wesa was named senior advisor to the Afghan Minister for Higher Education in 1989 and returned to his native city in 1991 as the founding president of Kandahar University. He and the family were forced to leave the country after Gul Agha Sherzai and other warlords fought for control over Kandahar. From 1993 to 1994, he served as a guest lecturer in the University of Zurich, Switzerland.

Before his appointment as Governor of Kandahar, he lived for 13 years in Coquitlam, British Columbia, Canada. He obtained his PhD from the University of British Columbia in Canada. His thesis was "The Afghan Agricultural Extension System: Impact of the Soviet Occupation and Prospects for the Future".

From 1995 to 1998, he worked for the Asian Studies Center and the Center for Policy Studies in Education at the University of British Columbia.

As a student, lecturer and researcher, Dr. Wesa has been associated with 10 universities worldwide and has published 20 articles including text books.

In addition to his career as an academic, Dr. Wesa has worked as a consultant for the Canadian Government (Statistics Canada), the US Government (USAID), British Government (DFID), the United Nations (FAO and UNDP) and several NGOs (including the SENLIS Council).

== Return to Afghanistan ==
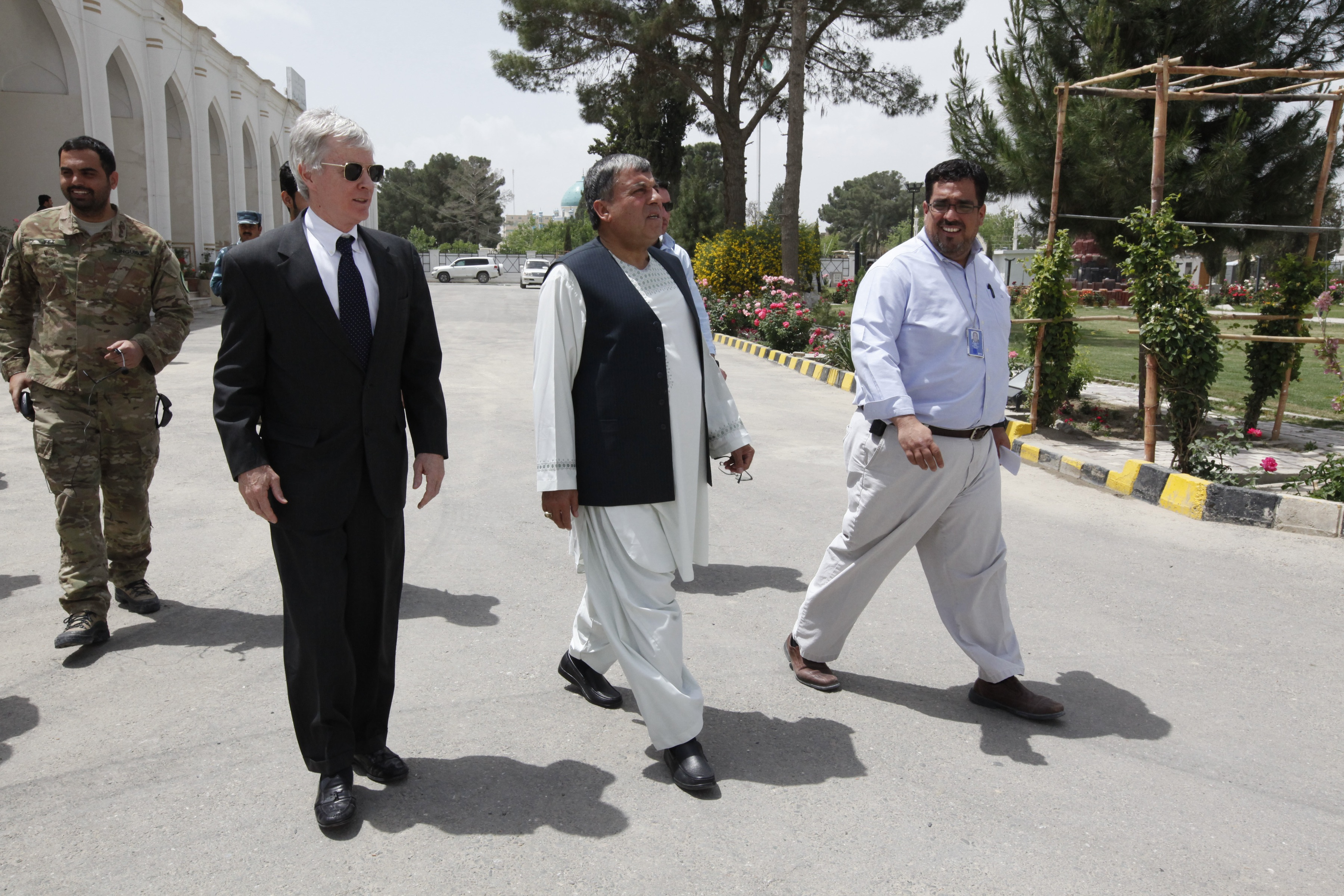
U.S. Ambassador Ryan Crocker and Toryalai Wesa in 2012.

Wesa was chosen by President Hamid Karzai to serve as Governor of Kandahar. Prior to that he was Chancellor of Kandahar University.

Dr. Wesa is fluent in English, Persian, German, Arabic, and his native Pashto language. His immediate family includes a wife and three daughters, one of which is a lawyer and another an economist. His wife, Rangina, is a gynecologist, training midwives.

== Assassination attempts ==
Wesa has survived a number of assassination attempts in Afghanistan.

He narrowly escaped an assassination attempt on 27 November 2009 when a roadside bomb damaged his vehicle.

On 28 April 2012, two Taliban suicide bombers unsuccessfully tried to kill him.

Preceded by Rahmatullah Raufi	Governor of Kandahar Province, Afghanistan; December 2008–present	Succeeded by incumbent
