= Mohamed Hassan (Egyptian musician) =

Egyptian singer (born 1983)

Mohamed Hassan محمد حسن
- Birth name: Mohamed Hassan Saad-Allah Ali Farag
- Also known as: Khalefet El-Andaleeb (The Nightingale Successor)
- Born: 3 December 1983 (age 41); Giza, Egypt
- Genres: Arab pop; Soul music; House music
- Occupation(s): Singer, lawyer
- Instrument(s): Vocal, piano
- Years active: 2009–present
- Labels: Platinium Records
- Website: mohamed-hassan.net

Mohamed Hassan (Arabic: محمد حسن born 3 December 1983) is an Egyptian singer who rose to fame in the third season of Arab Idol in 2014, broadcast by the MBC network. He was one of the best singers in the Program. He distinguished in Arab Idol with his deep strong sensitive voice. He Joined Arab Idol to achieve his father's dream to become a famous Arab singer. Hassan won the hearts of millions around the Arab world by singing for Abdelhalim Hafez and many other soul songs for other Arab stars. The Egyptian singer also has a Bachelor of Laws from Cairo University 2004. Before Arab Idol, Hassan was a Trouper in AbdelHalim Nouira orchestra in Cairo Opera House. He also was the vocalist of a band consisting of a group of talented youth friends called Taefeel Masry. Hassan often sings Eastern music, especially Egyptian Folk music and House Music. His idols are Abdelhalim Hafez, Mohamed Abdel Wahab, Warda and Saber el Rebaii.

Of his own songs:

- Khayyal
- Ana Masry (Ehdon Dafayerha)
- Wabbo (WaBBO Masry El-Taefeel) titre
- Ehky Ya Rawy
- Helmy Aeesh
- Ah Ya Ensan

Songs he performed in Arab Idol:

- Hayart Alby Maak (Umm Kulthum)
- Ay Dameet Hozn La (Abdelhalim Hafez)
- Ally Soutak (Mohamed Mounir)
- Khallas Tarak (Saber el Rebaii)
- Mabyesaalsh Alaya Abdan (Mohamed AbdEl Motteleb)
- Gabbar (Abdelhalim Hafez)
- Hawa Ya Hawa (Afaf Rady).
- Aal Helwa wel Morra (AbdelGhany El-Sayed)
- El Alb Yeeshak kol Gamil (Umm Kulthum)
