= Nawabi =

Sub-clan of the Barakzai tribe

Nawabi (Pashto: نوابي) is a sub clan of the Barakzai Pashtun tribe. The majority of this clan played an important role during the Barakzai dynasty - such as Ismail Khan Nawabi.

The name Nawabi is borrowed from the Arabic, being the honorific plural of Naib or "deputy". The name Nawab is used among West and South Asians.

The English adjective nawabi, from Pashto: نوابی, describes anything associated with a nawab.
