= Matthieu Aikins =

Canadian-American journalist and author

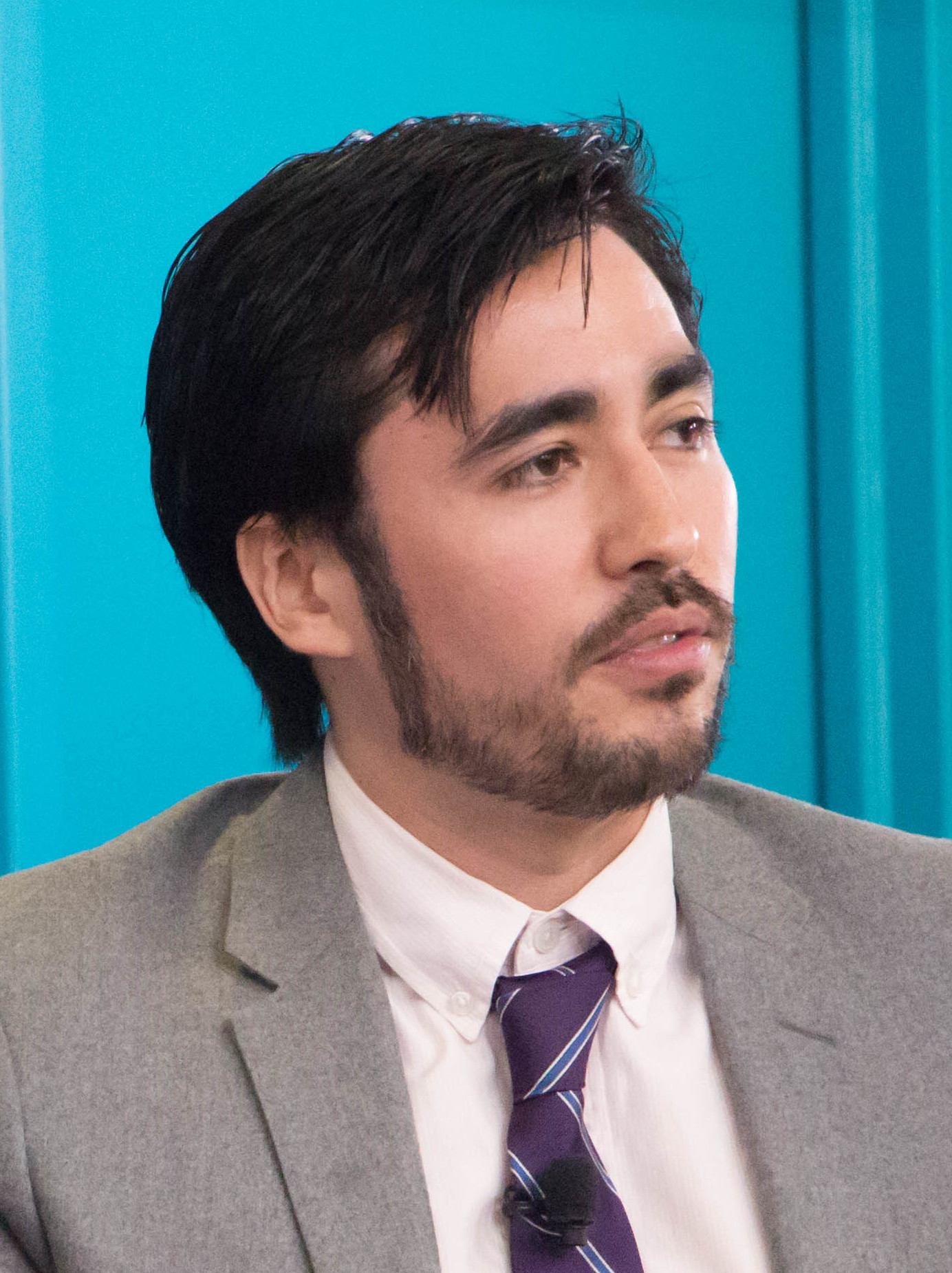
- Aikins in 2018
- Education: Queen's University at Kingston; New York University (2012)
- Occupation: Journalist
- Awards: Pulitzer Prize for International Reporting (2022), National Magazine Award for Reporting (2022), George Polk Award for Magazine Reporting (2014), Pulitzer Prize for Explanatory Reporting (2025)
- Website: maikins.com

Matthieu Aikins is a Canadian-American journalist and author best known for his reporting on the war in Afghanistan. He is a contributing writer for The New York Times Magazine, as well as a Puffin Foundation Fellow at the Type Media Center. He has also been a fellow at New America, the Council on Foreign Relations, and the American Academy in Berlin.

He is a recipient of two Pulitzer Prizes, the George Polk Award, and the National Magazine Award, and his writing has appeared in the anthology The Best American Magazine Writing 2012.

== Early life and education ==
Aikins grew up in Nova Scotia, Canada, and graduated from Queen's University at Kingston in 2006. Afterwards, he spent several years traveling North America and Eastern Europe. During that period, he contributed to Canadian newspapers and alt-weeklies. One of his articles, "Adam's Fall", about suicides from the Angus L. Macdonald Bridge in Halifax, Nova Scotia, won two major prizes; in 2009, the Halifax-Dartmouth Bridge Commission decided to build suicide-prevention barriers.

== Journalism career ==
In 2022, Aikins was awarded the Pulitzer Prize in International Reporting, as part of a New York Times team that investigated civilian casualties from US airstrikes in Afghanistan, Iraq, and Syria. Aikins was also a finalist for the Pulitzer in the same category that year for his contribution to The New York Times's reporting on the collapse of the Afghan government. His cover story for The New York Times Magazine on the fall of Kabul to the Taliban won the 2022 National Magazine Award for Reporting, and the Asia Society's Osborn Elliott Prize for Excellence in Journalism on Asia.

In 2016, he joined a friend and former translator for the United States on the "smuggler's road" to Europe, which is also a testament to the European migrant crisis. The book based on that experience, The Naked Don't Fear the Water, was published in February 2022. In 2019, he was announced as the Edward R. Murrow press fellow of the Council on Foreign Relations.

In 2008, Aikins traveled overland from Uzbekistan to Afghanistan, where he began his career reporting from the region. His half-Asian features and command of Persian allowed him to blend in as an Afghan, and Aikins began filing stories while traveling in local transportation and sleeping in roadside tea houses.

He wrote several breakthrough articles in 2009, including "Unembedded in Afghanistan" for The Coast, which led to his second Canadian Association of Journalists prize in two years, after his first for "Adam's Fall". He also wrote a story for Harper's Magazine, "The Master of Spin Boldak", about the Afghan Border Police in the town of Spin Boldak in Kandahar, Afghanistan. The article was later used to train U.S. military intelligence analysts on the region's history.

In 2010, he won a Canadian National Magazine Award for his story "Last Stand in Kandahar", published in The Walrus, which led to a National Magazine Award in Canada for "Best New Creative Talent". His 2011 article "Our Man in Kandahar", about the Afghan Border Force commander, Brigadier General Abdul Raziq, was a finalist in the reporting category for the National Magazine Awards. In 2012, he received a master's degree from New York University in Near East Studies.

In 2013, he published an article called "The A-Team Killings" in Rolling Stone, which investigated allegations against a U.S. Army Special Forces unit in Wardak Province, Afghanistan, received the 2013 George Polk Award for magazine reporting, and the 2014 Medill Medal for Courage in Journalism. His 2014 article "Whoever Saves a Life" in Matter about first responders in Syria won him a slew of awards, including the Livingston Award and the Overseas Press Club.

== Bibliography ==
=== Articles ===
- "Adam's Fall". The Coast. 31 January 2008.
- "Unembedded in Afghanistan". The Coast. 1 October 2009.
- "The Master of Spin Boldak". Harper's Magazine. December 2009.
- "Last Stand in Kandahar". The Walrus. 12 December 2010.
- "How Long Can the U.S. Ignore Systemic Torture in Afghanistan?". The Atlantic. 12 October 2011.
- "Our Man in Kandahar". The Atlantic. November 2011.
- "The A-Team Killings". Rolling Stone. 6 November 2013.
- "Whoever Saves a Life". Matter. Medium. 14 September 2014.
- "Inside the Fall of Kabul". The New York Times Magazine. 10 December 2021.

=== Books ===
- The Naked Don't Fear the Water: An Underground Journey with Afghan Refugees. Harper. 2022. ISBN 978-0063058583.
