= January 2017 Afghanistan bombings =

Series of bombings in Afghanistan

10 January 2017 Afghanistan bombings
- Part of War in Afghanistan (2001–2021)
- January 2017 Afghanistan bombings (Afghanistan)
- Location: Kabul, Kandahar, Lashkargah, Afghanistan
- Date: 10 January 2017
- Deaths: 65+ to 98+ (+3)
- Injuries: 94+
- Perpetrators: Taliban (claimed the first and the third bombing, denied responsibility of the second bombing); Haqqani network (suspected of the second bombing)

On 10 January 2017, multiple bombings in Afghanistan targeted the government and tribal establishments during the renewed War in Afghanistan. The Taliban claimed responsibility for all but one of the attacks, which targeted a United Arab Emirates diplomatic mission. In total, between 64 and 88 people were killed, at least 94 wounded, with at least three attackers also killed. Other attacks may have taken place.

== Bombings ==
=== First bombing ===
The first attack was a twin suicide bombing in front of the National Assembly of Afghanistan in the capital Kabul. The Taliban claimed responsibility for this attack that killed at least 46 people, mostly parliament workers, and wounded over 70, while they claimed that 70 were killed. The target was a National Directorate of Security minibus. There were two bombers, one on foot and one in a car.

=== Second bombing ===
The second attack occurred at Governor Humayun Azizi's guesthouse in Kandahar, when the United Arab Emirates ambassador Juma Al Kaabi and his fellow diplomats were being hosted for dinner. The UAE ambassador and diplomats were on a visit to Kandahar to lay the foundation stone for an orphanage to be built and sponsored by the UAE government. A hidden bomb was detonated during the meeting, killing at least 11 people and wounding at least 18. Among both the dead and the injured were many prominent Afghan politicians and diplomats, including 5 Emirati diplomats who were killed in the blast. The UAE Ambassador to Afghanistan, Juma Al Kaabi, was also injured during the attack, and died of his injuries more than a month later, on 15 February. Abdul Ali Shamsi, Kandahar's deputy governor, was also among those killed.

Although suspected, the Taliban did not claim responsibility for the bombing and instead blamed it on "internal local rivalry". Much of the bombing was orchestrated by a longtime cook named Sayeed Mahboob Agha. Agha had previously worked as a cook for members of the Taliban, and was known to have ongoing contact with the Taliban. Agha moved from Farah province to Kandahar to work at the Kandahar governor's guesthouse, on the recommendation of Taliban acquaintances. He was later offered $30,000 and a residence in Pakistan in exchange for smuggling a bomb into the guesthouse.

=== Third bombing ===
A third bombing that targeted a tribal elder occurred in Lashkargah, where at least seven to 16 civilians were killed and six to nine were injured, not including the deceased suicide bomber. The Taliban claimed responsibility for the attack.

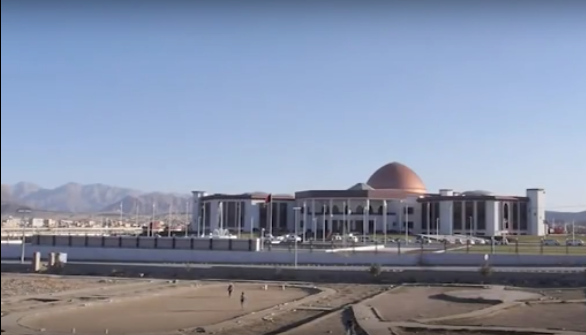
The National Assembly of Afghanistan.

== Victims ==
The bombings killed numerous civilians, diplomats, and guards. In total, at least 64 to at least 88 people were killed and at least 94 were wounded. Some of the named victims include:

- Five UAE diplomats, killed. The diplomats are Mohammed Ali Al Bastaki, Abdullah Mohammed Al Kaabi, Ahmed Rashid Al Mazroui, Ahmed Abdul Rahman Al Tunaiji, and Abdul Hamid Sultan Al Hammadi.
- UAE Ambassador Juma Al Kaabi, wounded, later died of his wounds in February 2017.
- Governor Humayun Azizi, wounded.
- Deputy governor Abdul Ali Shamsi, killed.
- MP Rahima Jami, wounded.
- Hashim Karzai, cousin of former president Hamid Karzai, wounded, later died of wounds on 16 January 2017.

== Reactions ==
The attacks triggered widespread condemnations and were denounced by multiple countries, organizations, and world leaders including the United Nations, UN Security Council, and the Gulf Cooperation Council.

Flags in the United Arab Emirates were flown at half mast for 3 days. Condolences poured in and the country's ministries, government departments and institutions honoured those killed. The United Arab Emirates stated that the attack on its diplomats would not stop it from continuing its humanitarian presence in Afghanistan.

== See also ==
- List of Islamist terrorist attacks
- List of terrorist incidents, 2017
- List of terrorist attacks in Kabul
