= Nurzai =

Pashtun tribe in Afghanistan

Noorzai (Pashto: نورزی) is the name of a Pashtun tribe, part of the Panjpai section of Durrani Pashtuns. Their name means "son of light" whereas Nur is an Arabic word that means "light", and "zai" means "son of" in the Pashto language. Historically the Noorzai tribe can be found in Kandahar province, as well as Helmand province, Herat and Farah. Furthermore, the tribe is even spread out as far as Pakistan. They are specifically centered in Panjwai district, Maywand district, Nawzad, Garmsir and Washir district. These places were infamous for being one of the main battlegrounds during the war in Afghanistan.

== Notable individuals ==
- Hibatullah Akhundzada, Supreme Commander of the Taliban and Islamic Emirate of Afghanistan
- Bashir Noorzai, Former Afghan drug lord known for being the "Pablo Escobar of the Middle East". He was one of the earliest members of the Afghan militant group Taliban.
- Maulavi Ubaidurrahman Nurzai, Was a Taliban commander who fought against a NATO-led coalition in Helmand province. He took part in the battle of Garmsir.
- Mohammad Arif Noorzai, Former minister of border and tribe affairs for Afghanistan.
- Wali Muhammad Noorzai, prominent MPA and Noorzai tribal leader in Balochistan. He represents Quetta District and advocates for his constituents' rights and development. As a respected tribal leader, he resolves disputes and promotes peace, bridging the gap between government and tribal communities.
- Abdul Jabar Qahraman, Afghan army general who was an influential leader and politician.
- Zalmay Khalilzad, American diplomat and foreign policy expert. He was the highest muslim-american in government during his time in office. Furthermore, he was the former ambassador to Afghanistan during the bush administration. He took part in the Doha-agreement which caused the American armed forces to withdraw from Afghanistan.
