= Mohammad Hasan Rahmani =

Mohammad Hasan Rahmani محمد حسن رحمانی
- Born: 1963; Uruzgan province, Kingdom of Afghanistan
- Died: February 7, 2016 (aged 52–53); Karachi, Pakistan

Mohammad Hasan Rahmani (circa 1963 – 7 February 2016), also written Muhammad Hassan Rahmani, was the governor of Kandahar Province for the Taliban until 2001 and then a member of the Taliban's top council, the Rahbari Shura.

== Early life ==
Hasan was born in Uruzgan Province in 1963 and raised in poverty. He belonged to the Achakzai Pashtun tribe. He attended a madrasa (Islamic seminary) in Quetta, Pakistan. Hasan fought as a mujahideen with the Islamic Revolution Movement (Harakat-i-Inqilab-i-Islami) led by Mohammad Nabi Mohammadi during the Soviet–Afghan War. He lost one of his legs to a landmine during a raid on a Soviet base in 1989 and had a wooden pegleg after that.

Hasan was governor of Kandahar Province from when the Taliban took control of it in 1994 until the United States invasion of Afghanistan in 2001. He governed in strict accordance with the Taliban's interpretation of Sharia law, which called for the death penalty for adultery and amputation for thievery. Regarding homosexuality, Hasan stated, "According to the Koran, homosexuality is a great sin. I have listened to the radio, and I know that even in the rest of the world there is a great struggle against this. But our religious scholars are not agreed on the right kind of punishment. Some say we should take these sinners to a high roof and throw them down, while others say we should dig a hole beside a wall, bury them, then push the wall down on top of them." However, in practice, homosexuals were punished only by public shaming. His rule also required men to grow beards and banned television and cinema.

After the US invasion, the Taliban leader Mohammed Omar appointed Hasan to the Rahbari Shura, also known as the Quetta Shura, and he moved to Pakistan, where he was active in the top Taliban leadership and the resistance to the US-led forces in Afghanistan. He and two other members of the shura represented the Taliban at peace talks with Afghan government representatives held secretly in Urumqi, China, in May 2015.

Mohammed Omar's death was announced in July 2015 (he had died in 2013) and Akhtar Mansour was appointed his replacement as supreme leader of the Taliban. Hasan was one of several senior Taliban leaders who opposed Mansour's appointment and did not pledge allegiance to him. Hasan wanted Omar's son Mohammad Yaqoob to be the leader, and objected to the process and speed in which Mansour was appointed. It was rumoured that Hasan was expelled from the shura, but this was denied by Taliban spokesman Zabiullah Mujahid. It was reported weeks before Hasan died that he had relented and pledged loyalty to Mansour.

Hasan died of cancer in hospital in Karachi on 7 February 2016. He was buried in Quetta.

== See also ==
- Mohammad Hassan Akhund – another Taliban leader named Mohammad Hassan
