= Fort Lewis (Washington) =

Former U.S. Army post in Washington state

- Part of Installation Management Command
- Located near: Tacoma, Washington
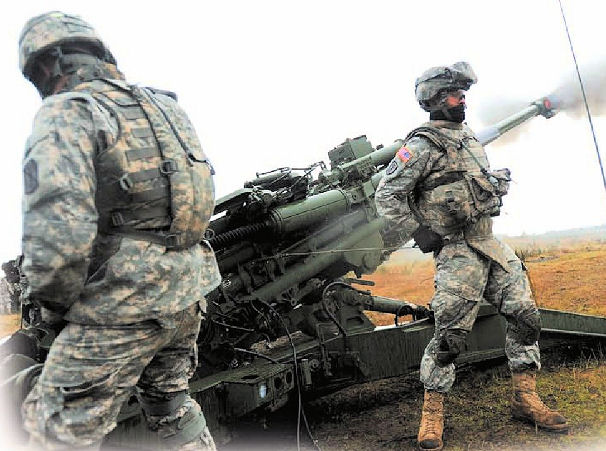
- Personnel of the 17th Field Artillery Brigade, Fort Lewis

Site information
- Controlled by: United States Army

Location
- Coordinates: 47°06′21″N 122°33′52″W

Site history
- Built: 1917
- In use: 1917–present

Garrison information
- Garrison: Headquarters and Headquarters Company, Joint Base Garrison (US Army)

Fort Lewis is a United States Army base located 9.1 miles (14.6 km) south-southwest of Tacoma, Washington. Fort Lewis was merged with McChord Air Force Base on February 1, 2010, to form Joint Base Lewis–McChord.

Fort Lewis, named after Meriwether Lewis of the Lewis and Clark Expedition, was one of the largest and most modern military reservations in the United States, consisting of 87,000 acres (136 mi^{2}; 350 km^{2}) of prairie land cut from the glacier-flattened Nisqually Plain.

Joint Base Lewis-McChord (Fort Lewis) is a major Army installation, with much of the 2nd Infantry Division in residence, along with Headquarters, the 7th Infantry Division, 593rd Expeditionary Sustainment Command, and the 1st Special Forces Group. However, the Headquarters of the 7th Infantry Division is primarily a garrison management body. Fort Lewis's geographic location provides rapid access to the deep-water ports of Tacoma, Olympia, and Seattle for deploying equipment. Units can be deployed from McChord AFB, and individuals and small groups can also use the nearby Sea-Tac Airport. The strategic location of the base provides Air Force units with the ability to conduct combat and humanitarian airlifts with the C-17 Globemaster III.

== Joint Base Garrison ==
The Joint Base Garrison operates the installation on behalf of the warfighting units, families, and extended military community who depend on JBLM for support. The mission of the unit is to provide support to mission commanders and the joint base community, to serve as an enabler to the soldiers as they train and project America's combat power, and to make JBLM the station of choice for American soldiers and their families.

With an Army joint base commander and an Air Force deputy joint base commander, the garrison supports the installation through directorates and agencies that provide a full range of city services and quality-of-life functions, everything from facility maintenance, recreation, and family programs to training support and emergency services.

The major organizations that make up the bulk of the Joint Base Garrison include:

- Directorates of Public Works: Logistics
- Family and Morale, Welfare, and Recreation
- Human Resources; Emergency Services
- Plans and Training Security and Plans

Additional staff offices that support the installation mission include the Joint Base Public Affairs Office, the Religious Support Office, the Resource Management Office, the Equal Employment Opportunity Office, the Installation Safety Office, and the Plans, Analysis, and Integration Office. Other partners who work closely with the Joint Base Garrison include the Civilian Personnel Advisory Center, the Mission and Installation Contracting Command, and the Joint Personal Property Shipping Office.

Three military units support the Joint Base Garrison.

- 627th Air Base Group

Provides command and control and administrative oversight to the Airmen who perform installation support duties on behalf of the garrison.

- Headquarters and Headquarters Company, Joint Base Garrison

Provides administrative oversight to the Army personnel in the garrison and supports newly arrived soldiers during their in-processing period.

JBLM Soldiers receive medical care through on-base Madigan Healthcare System facilities such as the Madigan Army Medical Center, the Okubo Clinic, and the Nisqually Clinic. JBLM Airmen receive medical care at the McChord Clinic as well as the Madigan Army Medical Center.

=== JBLM Main and JBLM North ===
JBLM has more than 25,000 soldiers and civilian workers. The post supports over 120,000 military retirees and more than 29,000 family members living both on and off-post. Fort Lewis proper contains 86,000 acres (134 sq mi; 350 km^{2}), and the Yakima Training Center covers 324,000 acres (506 sq mi; 1,310 km^{2}).

JBLM Main & North have abundant, high-quality, close-in training areas, including 115 live fire ranges. Additional training space is available at the Yakima Training Center in eastern Washington, including maneuver areas and additional live fire ranges.

In 2009, the former Fort Lewis Regional Correction Facility was remodeled and renamed the Northwest Joint Regional Correctional Facility (NWJRCF). The facility houses minimum- and medium-security prisoners from all branches of the U.S. Armed Forces.

Also adjacent to the post is Camp Murray (Washington National Guard).

== History ==
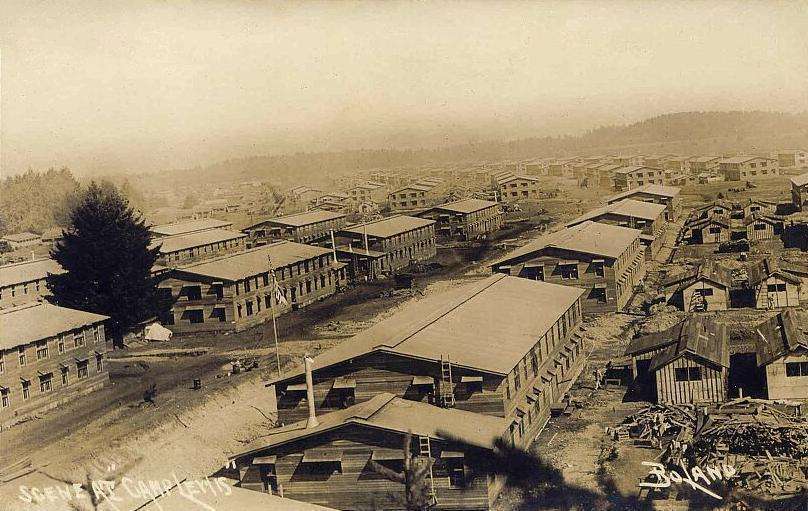
Camp Lewis c. 1917

Camp Lewis during World War I construction

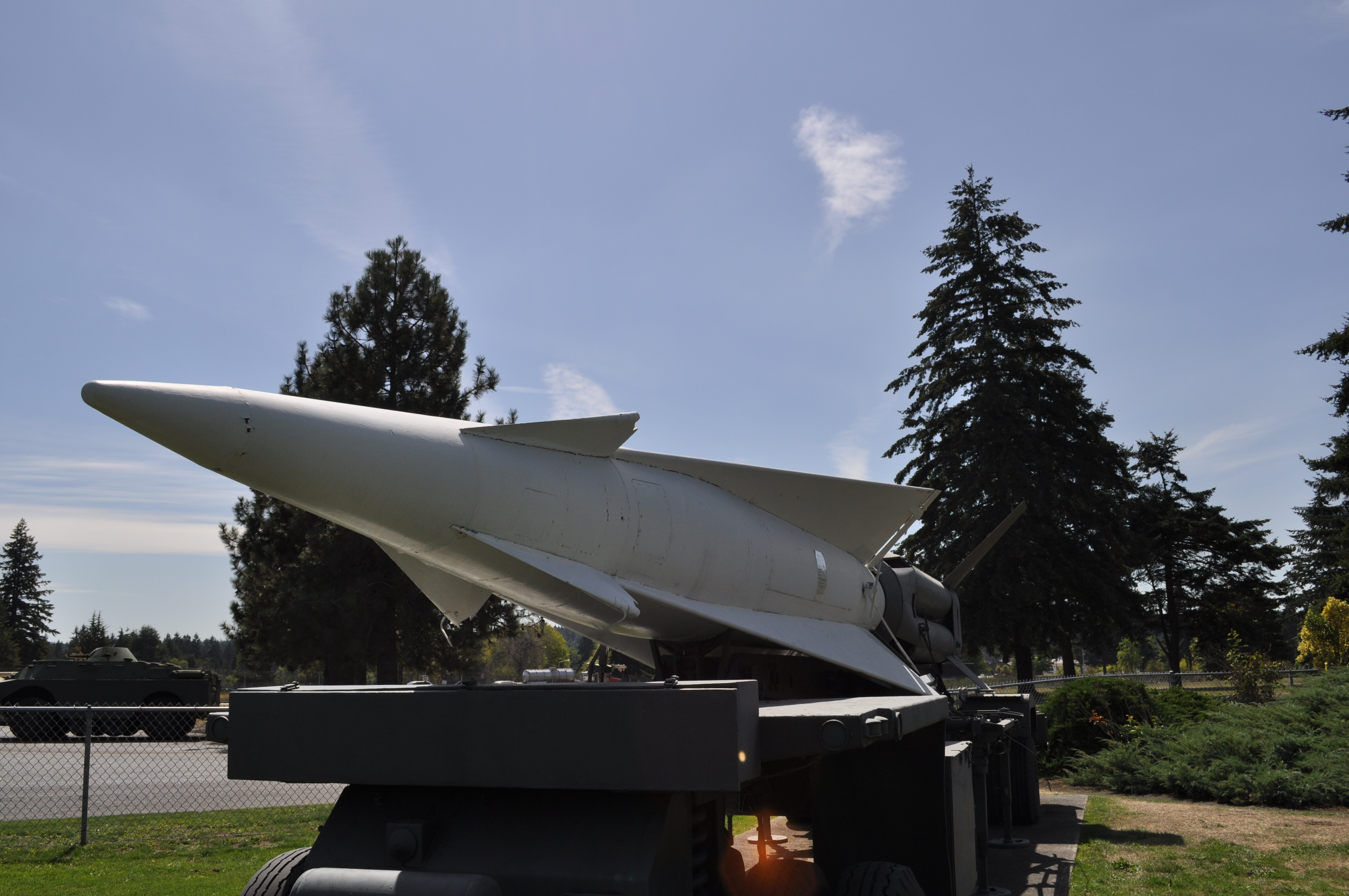
MIM-14 Nike Hercules anti-aircraft missile at the Fort Lewis Military Museum

Fort Lewis was originally established in 1917 with the passage of a Pierce County bond measure to purchase 70,000 acres (280 km^{2}) of land to donate to the federal government for permanent use as a military installation. A portion of the initial land was taken from the Nisqually tribe's reservation. (The Nisqually people would later petition unsuccessfully for the return of this land.) In 1927, Pierce County passed another bond measure to establish a military airfield just north of Fort Lewis. The airfield, called Tacoma Field, opened in 1930 and was renamed McChord Field in 1940. McChord Field separated from Fort Lewis when the U.S. Air Force was created in 1947 and was subsequently renamed McChord Air Force Base. The two bases operated independently of one another for more than 60 years before merging in 2010.

Fort Lewis began as Camp Lewis in 1917, when the citizens of Pierce County voted by an eight-to-one margin to bond themselves for $2,000,000 (equivalent to $50,259,740 in 2025) to buy 68,721 acres (107.377 sq mi; 278.10 km^{2}) of land. They donated the land to the federal government for military use. The only stipulation was that the tract be used as a permanent army post. Captain David L. Stone and his staff arrived at the camp site on May 26, 1917, and a few days later the initial construction began. As work on the camp was pushing forward, the War Department named it "Camp Lewis" after Meriwether Lewis of the Lewis and Clark Expedition. The entire camp was ready for occupancy a month ahead of schedule. In 90 days, Stone had supervised the construction of a "city" of 757 buildings and 422 other structures, all lighted and heated for 60,000 men. The first recruits moved into their new barracks on September 5, 1917, exactly two months after the post building plan had been handed to the contractors.

When they implemented the auction of the new cantonment, workmen subscribed for $4,000 to build the main gate, which is still standing. The arch was built of fieldstone and squared logs, resembling the old blockhouses that stood in the northwest as forts. Some 60,000 men, including the 13th and 91st Divisions, moved into the hastily constructed cantonment to train for World War I. Recruited largely from the northwest, the 91st was considered "Washington's Own." In 1917, Pierce County, through the process of condemnation proceedings (eminent domain), took 3,370 acres (13.6 km^{2}) of the Nisqually Indian Reservation (14 km^{2}) for the Fort Lewis Military Reserve.

The following two years saw tremendous activity at Camp Lewis as men mobilized and trained for war service. With the conclusion of the war, activities at Lewis ground to a standstill. Camp Lewis passed from the hands of Pierce County and became the property of the federal government when the deed for 62,432 acres (253 km^{2}) was recorded in the county auditor's office in Tacoma.

When World War I ended in 1918, the Nisqually people petitioned for their land to be returned to them, but the request was denied by the Secretary of War, Newton Baker.

Brigadier General David L. Stone, who had supervised the original construction of Fort Lewis as a captain, returned as its commanding general in 1936, serving until 1937. The project of constructing an army airfield, which later became McChord Air Force Base, directly north of the Fort Lewis installation, received approval as a WPA project in January 1938, and $61,730 was allocated for construction. The allocation provided for clearing, grading, and leveling a runway 6,000 feet (1,800 m) long by 600 feet (180 m) wide.

From 1942 to 1943, 42 Japanese, German, and Italian Americans were held at Fort Lewis as part of the government's "enemy alien" internment program during World War II. The Japanese and Italian internees were transferred to Fort Missoula and the Germans to Fort Lincoln, and the temporary detention facility closed on March 30, 1943. Italian prisoners of war, organized into units, were trained as quartermaster units at Fort Lewis since, after Italy surrendered to the Allies and declared war on Germany, they were not strictly held to the work requirements that prohibited prisoners of war from working on items directly headed for the war or in the war effort.

At the conclusion of World War II, the northwest staging area of Fort Lewis became a separation center and discharged its first soldiers in October 1945. Sometime in the early 1960s, Interstate 5 was built through the fort, separating the northwest corner of the fort and creating "Northfort". With the departure of the 4th Infantry Division (United States) for Vietnam in 1966, Fort Lewis once again became a personnel transfer and training center. David H. Hackworth described his service commanding a training battalion at the Fort during the Vietnam War in his memoir "About Face". In 1972, the 9th Infantry Division (United States) was reactivated and trained there until its deactivation in 1991.

The Fort Lewis Military Museum was established in 1972 to preserve and document the post's history.

The base received much media attention in the wake of the Kandahar massacre, committed by a Fort Lewis soldier in March 2012.

The 1st Joint Mobilization Brigade disbanded in late May 2014. It previously controlled and provided host unit support for mobilizing, deploying, and demobilizing reserve component units from all the U.S. military services. The unit began as the 2122nd Garrison Support Unit (Army Reserve), overseeing the mobilization of about 27,000 Soldiers. The group of fewer than a dozen personnel mobilized about 15,000 soldiers within three weeks at the start of the War in Afghanistan. The unit was redesignated the 654th Area Support Group (Forward) in May 2004 and the 1st JMB in March 2007. Training and mobilization validation moved to individual units (instead of the 1st JMB) in 2011.

=== Major units ===
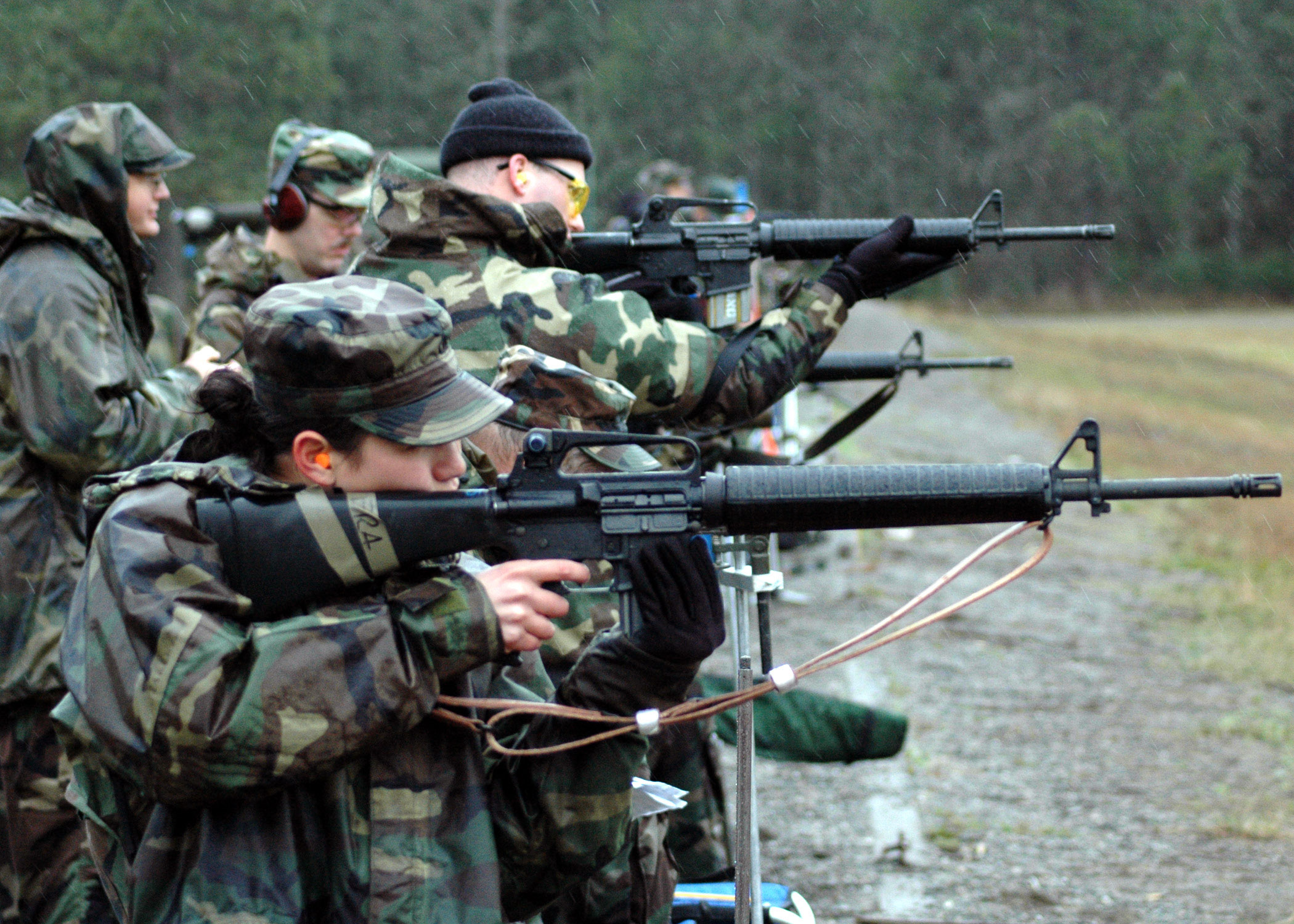
Rifle confidence training

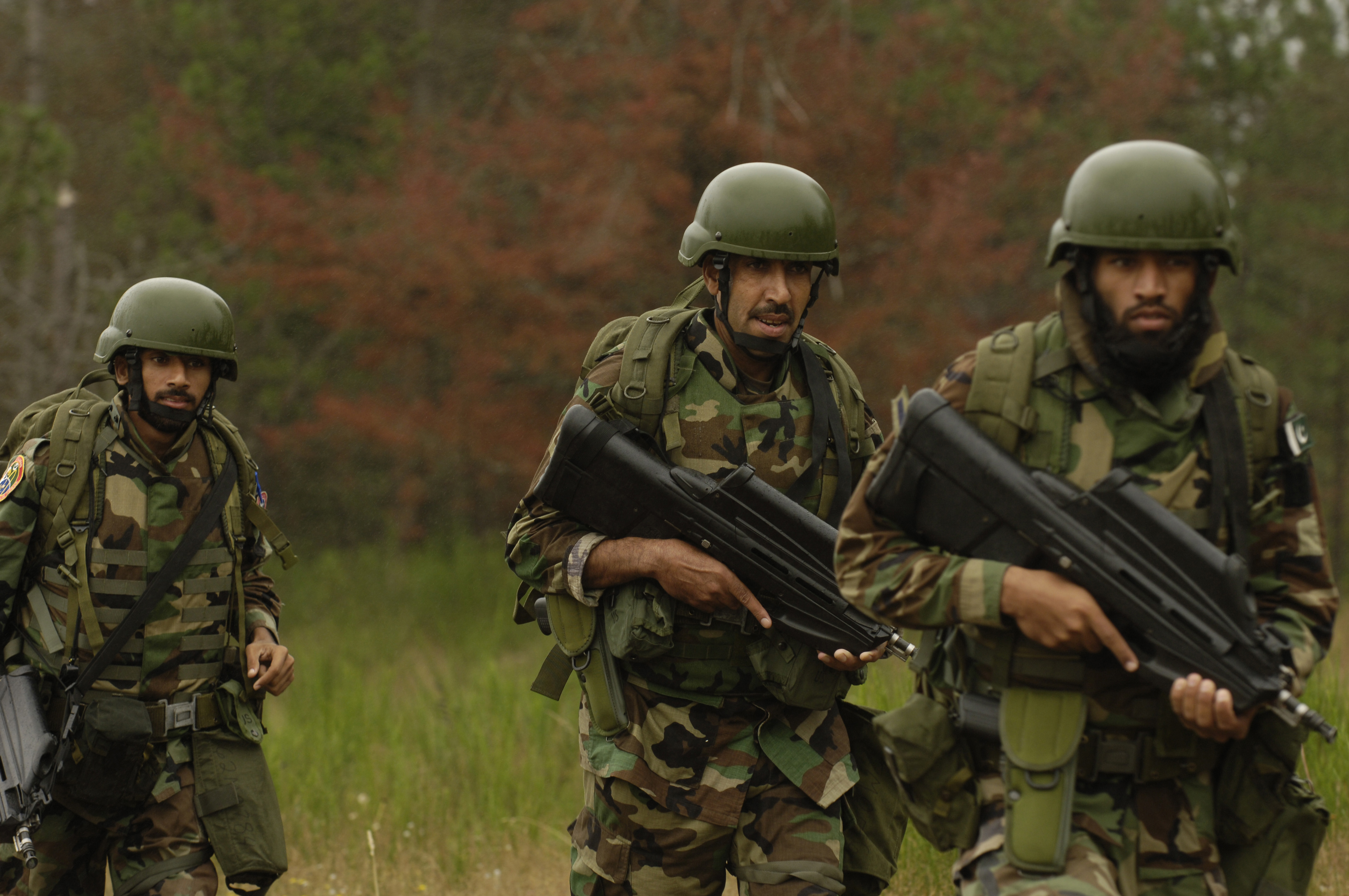
Pakistani Special Services Wing carrying FN F2000 rifles while on training at Fort Lewis, July 23, 2007

The United States Army's I Corps commands most Army units at Joint Base Lewis-McChord and conducts planning and liaison with other assigned active and Reserve component units in the continental United States. It is one of the active Army's contingency corps. I Corps stays prepared to deploy on short notice worldwide to command up to five divisions or a joint task force.

In 1981, the I Corps was reactivated at Fort Lewis. On October 12, 1999, General Eric K. Shinseki, Chief of Staff of the Army, announced I Corps would lead the acceleration of Army transformation, training, and the initial creation of the first two Stryker Brigade Combat Teams at Fort Lewis. Since September 11, 2001, I Corps and Fort Lewis assets have been active in providing support for global war on terrorism operations, including Operation Noble Eagle (Homeland Defense), Operation Enduring Freedom (Afghanistan), and the Iraq War.

On February 5, 2004, Task Force Olympia was activated as a sub-element of I Corps headquarters with the mission to command forward-deployed units in Iraq. This marked the first time that I Corps had forward soldiers in combat since the end of the Korean War. Task Force Olympia included units from all three components of the Army (Active, Reserve, and National Guard) as well as Marine and Australian officers. Task Force Olympia's subordinate units included the 3rd Stryker Brigade Combat Team, 2nd Infantry Division, which deployed for Iraq on November 8, 2003, and returned to Fort Lewis after one year of combat duty, and the 1st Brigade, 25th Infantry Division, which departed Fort Lewis on September 15, 2004, for one year, and returned in September 2005. On June 1, 2006, the 1st Brigade, 25th Infantry Division, changed its name and became the 2d Cavalry Regiment, Stryker Brigade Combat Team, with its home station in Germany. A new unit then unveiled the colors of its new designation on June 1, 2006: the 4th Brigade, 2d Infantry Division.

Subordinate units assigned to Fort Lewis are:

- 7th Infantry Division
  - 1st Brigade, 2nd Infantry Division
  - 2nd Brigade, 2nd Infantry Division
  - 17th Field Artillery Brigade
  - 16th Combat Aviation Brigade
  - 201st Expeditionary Military Intelligence Brigade
  - 555th Engineer Brigade
- 593rd Expeditionary Sustainment Command
  - 42nd Military Police Brigade
  - 62nd Medical Brigade
- Henry H. Lind Noncommissioned Officer Academy
- 1st Special Forces Group (Airborne)
- 2nd Battalion, 75th Ranger Regiment
- 66th Theater Aviation Command
- 4th Battalion, 160th Special Operations Aviation Regiment (Airborne)
- 404th Army Field Support Brigade
- Eighth Brigade, U.S. Army Cadet Command (ROTC)
- 189th Infantry Brigade (First Army, DIVWEST)
- 191st Infantry Brigade (inactivation ceremony held on 8 January 2014)
- Headquarters, 6th Military Police Group (CID)
- Washington Regional Flight Center
- Western Regional Medical Command
- Public Health Command Region-West
- The KIM Dental Activity
- The Veterinary Treatment Facility

=== JBLM Main and JBLM North ===
JBLM has more than 25,000 soldiers and civilian workers. The post supports over 120,000 military retirees and more than 29,000 family members living both on and off-post. Fort Lewis proper contains 86,000 acres (350 km^{2}), the Yakima Training Center covers 324,000 acres (1,310 km^{2}).

JBLM Main & North have abundant, high-quality, close-in training areas, including 115 live fire ranges. Additional training space is available at the Yakima Training Center in eastern Washington, including maneuver areas and additional live fire ranges.

In 2009, the former Fort Lewis Regional Correction Facility was remodeled and renamed the Northwest Joint Regional Correctional Facility (NWJRCF). The facility houses minimum- and medium-security prisoners from all branches of the U.S. Armed Forces.

During the summer months (June, July, and August), JBLM North hosts the Leader Development and Assessment Course, a capstone program for the U.S. Army's ROTC program.

Also adjacent to the post is Camp Murray (Washington National Guard).

=== Yakima Training Center ===
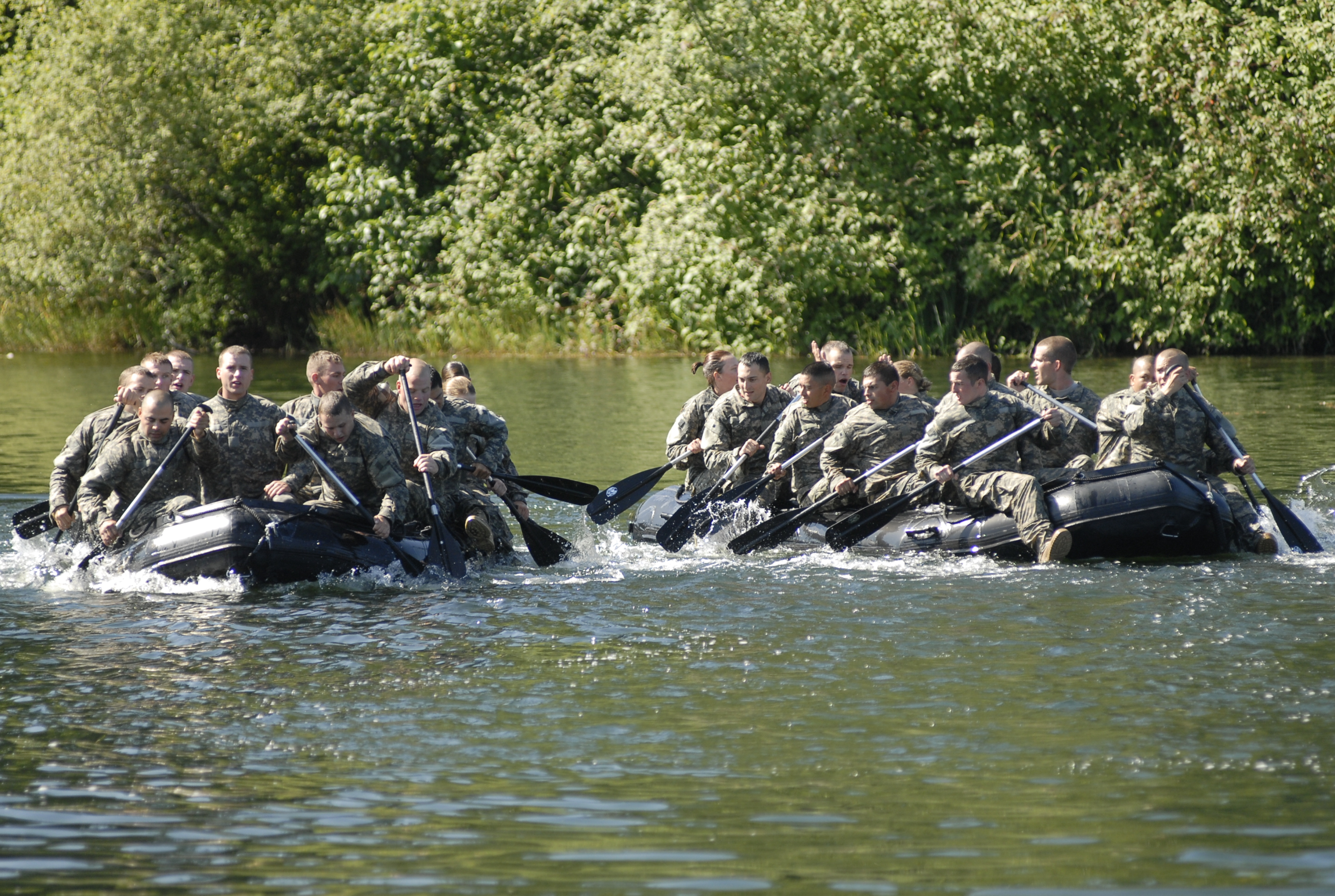
Teams of ROTC cadets compete at the water confidence course during Leader Development and Assessment Course training

The Yakima Training Center is a major sub-installation of JBLM and provides a full range of training lands and ranges to active and reserve component units. Encompassing more than 320,000 acres (500 sq mi; 1,300 km^{2}), YTC is a world-class facility.

The training center is in the high desert and is covered with sagebrush, volcanic formations, dry gulches, and large rock outcroppings. YTC has vast flat valleys separated by intervening ridges that are suited to large-scale mechanized or motorized forces. Much of the steeper terrain resembles areas of Afghanistan. Twenty-five ranges, including the state-of-the-art Multi-Purpose Range Complex and Shoot House, are available for individual or collective training.

Prior to 1941, the area consisted of ranches and a few scattered silica mines. Just before World War II, the Army's need for a large training and maneuver area became apparent, and the Army negotiated with landowners to lease 160,000 acres (250 sq mi; 650 km^{2}) for the Yakima Anti-Aircraft Artillery Range. Military organizations in the Pacific Northwest used the center for range firing and small unit tests. The first range was constructed in 1942 on Umtanum Ridge, 13 miles (21 km) northeast of the present cantonment area.

In 1947, approximately 60,000 acres (240 km^{2}) were cleared of unexploded ammunition and returned to the original owners. During 1949 and 1950, the state of Washington used the center for summer training of its National Guard units, and regular Army troops were permanently assigned to the center. At the start of the Korean War, the Army decided to expand the Yakima Training Center. In 1951, the Installation was enlarged to 261,451 acres (1,058.05 km^{2}), and construction of the current cantonment area began.

In 1986, a further expansion was initiated, and in 1992, the Army acquired additional land to enlarge YTC to 327,000 acres (1,320 km^{2}). The Multi-Purpose Range Complex opened in 1989, and the Shoot House and Urban Assault Course opened in 2005. YTC has an AAFES shopette, a recreation center, and a gymnasium available to soldiers and their families. The Firing Point community club, with cafeteria, opened in February 2009.

=== Gray Army Airfield ===
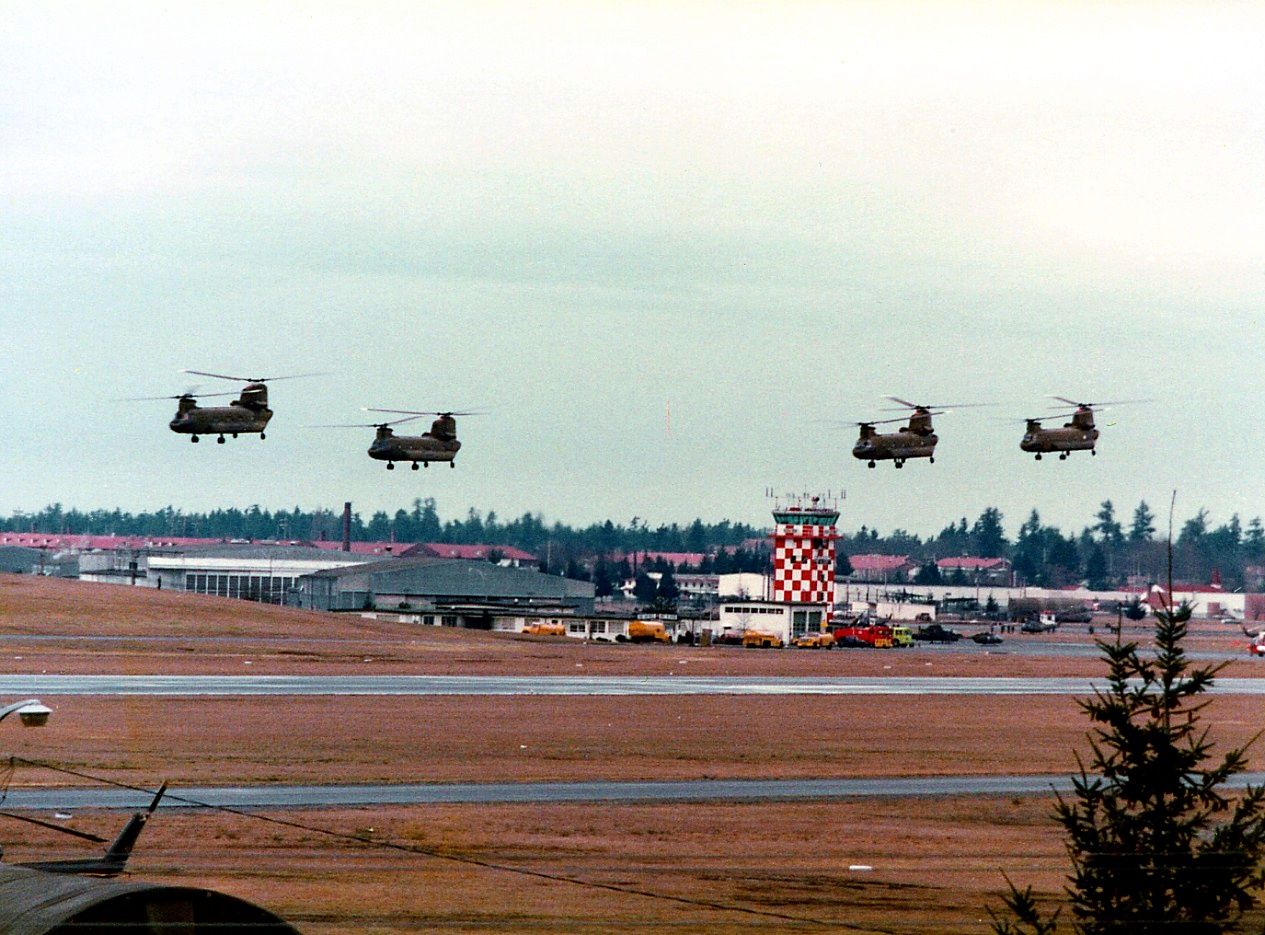
Chinook helicopters over Gray Army Airfield at Ft. Lewis in 1977

Gray Army Airfield (IATA: GRF, ICAO: KGRF) is a military airport located within Fort Lewis. The field is named in honor of Captain Lawrence C. Gray, who died during a free balloon flight at the field on November 4, 1927. The field is now used by Army helicopters.

Helicopters based at the airfield assisted with medical evacuations at Mount Rainier National Park on numerous occasions in the 1970s. Army helicopters were also used to insert search-and-rescue [SAR] teams into inaccessible areas on the east, north, and west sides of the mountain, lowering rangers to the ground by a cable device known as a "jungle penetrator". Helicopters began assisting with high-altitude (above 10,000 feet) SAR operations in the 1980s. Helicopters were also used for "short haul" rescue operations, in which a ranger and litter were carried in a sling below the helicopter to the scene of the accident.

During World War II, the Air Transport Command's 4131st Army Air Force Base Unit used GAAF as the CONUS hub for the Alaskan West Coast Wing, ferrying supplies, equipment, and aircraft to the Eleventh Air Force at Elmendorf Field, near Anchorage. Also used by Air Technical Service Command as an aircraft maintenance and supply depot, primarily to service aircraft being sent to Alaska. The Army Air Force closed its facilities in 1947.

== Geography ==
According to the United States Census Bureau, the CDP has a total area of 15.9 square miles (41.2 km^{2}), of which 15.3 square miles (39.6 km^{2}) are land and 0.6 square miles (1.6 km^{2}) are water. The total area is 3.78% water. The military base is, as previously stated, much larger than the CDP defined by the Census Bureau.

Fort Lewis' terrain is primarily a mixture of dense conifer woods and open Puget prairie-garry oak woodlands. Invasive Scotch Broom has taken over many areas. The landscape is very rocky from glacial meltwater deposits. Poison oak is found in the training areas. Canada Thistle grows thickly in some areas. All trees are to be left standing; post policy prohibits cutting or trimming them.

The temperatures during summer vary from the mid-40s at night to the mid-70s during the day, occasionally peaking over 90 °F (32 °C). Although July and August are the driest months.

Fort Lewis, due to its size and reserved land, serves as an important habitat for amphibian development and study.

== Demographics ==
Fort Lewis has been tracked by the U.S. Census Bureau as an unincorporated place in the 1970 U.S. census and then as a census-designated place (CDP) since the 1980 U.S. census.

Historical population
Census	Pop.	Note	%±
1970	38,054		—
1980	23,761		−37.6%
1990	22,224		−6.5%
2000	19,089		−14.1%
2010	11,046		−42.1%
2020	14,052		27.2%
U.S. Decennial Census; 1960 1970 1980 1990; 2000 2010

=== Racial and ethnic composition ===
Fort Lewis CDP, Washington – Racial and ethnic composition Note: the US Census treats Hispanic/Latino as an ethnic category. This table excludes Latinos from the racial categories and assigns them to a separate category. Hispanics/Latinos may be of any race.
Race / Ethnicity (NH = Non-Hispanic)	Pop 2000	Pop 2010	Pop 2020	% 2000	% 2010	% 2020
White alone (NH)	10,685	6,635	6,746	55.97%	60.07%	48.01%
Black or African American alone (NH)	3,758	1,122	1,699	19.69%	10.16%	12.09%
Native American or Alaska Native alone (NH)	222	138	148	1.16%	1.25%	1.05%
Asian alone (NH)	631	323	674	3.31%	2.92%	4.80%
Native Hawaiian or Pacific Islander alone (NH)	332	238	390	1.74%	2.15%	2.78%
Other race alone (NH)	71	19	54	0.37%	0.17%	0.38%
Mixed race or Multiracial (NH)	883	771	972	4.63%	6.98%	6.92%
Hispanic or Latino (any race)	2,507	1,800	3,369	13.13%	16.30%	23.98%
Total	19,089	11,046	14,052	100.00%	100.00%	100.00%

=== 2000 census ===
As of the census of 2000, there were 19,089 people, 3,476 households, and 3,399 families residing on the base. The population density was 1,248.5 people per square mile (482.0/km^{2}). There were 3,560 housing units at an average density of 232.8 per square mile (89.9/km^{2}). The racial makeup of the base was 60.4% White, 20.3% African American, 1.4% Native American, 3.4% Asian, 1.8% Pacific Islander, 6.2% from other races, and 6.4% from two or more races. 13.1% of the population were Hispanic or Latino of any race.

There were 3,476 households, out of which 85.8% had children under the age of 18 living with them, 89.3% were married couples living together, 6.6% had a female householder with no husband present, and 2.2% were non-families. Of all households, 2.0% were made up of individuals, and 0.0% had someone living alone who was 65 years of age or older. The average household size was 3.75, and the average family size was 3.78.

The age distribution was 32.1% under the age of 18, 28.0% from 18 to 24, 37.5% from 25 to 44, 2.0% from 45 to 64, and 0.4% who were 65 years of age or older. The median age was 22 years. For every 100 females, there were 168.3 males. For every 100 females age 18 and over, there were 212.5 males. All these statistics were typical for military bases.

The median income for a household on the base was $32,384, and the median income for a family was $32,251. Males had a median income of $20,878 versus $20,086 for females. The per capita income for the base was $12,865. 8.2% of the population and 7.1% of families were below the poverty line. Out of the total population, 10.7% of those under the age of 18 and 0.0% of those 65 and older were living below the poverty line.

== See also ==
- 91st Division Monument
