= Johnny M. Horne Jr. =

Former U.S. Staff Sergeant and convicted criminal for murder

Johnny Mclnerny Horne Jr. is a former Staff Sergeant in the U.S. Army convicted, along with Cardenas J. Alban, for the murder of Qassim Hassan, a sixteen-year-old Iraqi. At the time of the killing Horne was a member of Company C, 1st Battalion, 41st Infantry Regiment, based in Fort Riley, Kansas. He pleaded guilty to one count of unpremeditated murder and one count of conspiracy to commit murder and received three years of confinement, reduction in rank to Private, forfeiture of all wages and a dishonorable discharge. Horne was confined at the Northwest Joint Regional Correctional Facility on Fort Lewis and was released in September 2005 after having his sentence reduced to one year by, then, Maj. Gen. Peter W. Chiarelli.

In August 2004, U.S. forces opened fire on a group of men along a road in Al Sadr City in Baghdad. Troops from the 1st Battalion arrived on the scene to find a burning truck and casualties around it. Witnesses said that the Iraqi teen already had severe abdominal wounds and burns before the shooting. Horne claimed that he carried out a "mercy killing".

Since his release Horne has spoken out in defense of a group of US military personnel convicted of war crimes colloquially known as the "Leavenworth 10."
