= Joint Regional Correctional Facility =

Joint Regional Correctional Facility (JRCF) can refer to:

- Northwest Joint Regional Correctional Facility
- Midwest Joint Regional Correctional Facility
