= 308th Brigade =

308th Brigade may refer to:

- 308th Brigade, Royal Field Artillery, United Kingdom
- 308th Infantry Brigade, United Kingdom
- 308th Civil Affairs Brigade, United States

== See also ==
- 308th Brigade Support Battalion, United States
- 308th Division (disambiguation)
- 308th Regiment (disambiguation)
