= 94th Field Artillery Regiment =

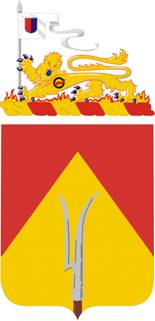
- Coat of arms
- Active: 1933-present
- Country: United States
- Branch: United States Army
- Type: Field artillery
- Role: USARS parent regiment
- Size: regiment
- Motto: FLEXIBLE
- Branch color: Scarlet
- Engagements: World War II; Normandy; Northern France; Rhineland; Battle of Arracourt; Ardennes-Alsace; Central Europe; Vietnam War; Operation Desert Storm; War on terrorism; Operation Iraqi Freedom

Insignia
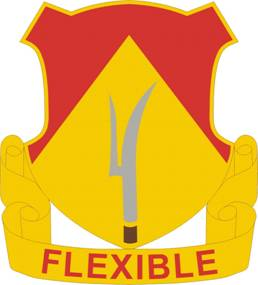
- Distinctive unit insignia

The 94th Field Artillery is a regiment of the Field Artillery Branch of the United States Army. It was constituted in 1933.

== History ==
It was redesignated as Battery A, 94th Armored Field Artillery Battalion on 1 January 1942. Five days later it was assigned to the 4th Armored Division at Pine Camp, New York. During the Second World War, the 94th Field Artillery earned six campaign streamers. The unit fought with distinction spanning from Normandy though the Ardennes-Alsace region into the Rhineland.

After World War II, the 94th Field Artillery converted and redesignated on 1 May 1964 as the 94th Constabulary Squadron and was concurrently relieved from their assignment to the 4th Armored Division and reassigned to the 11th Constabulary Regiment.

On 6 January 1948, they were subsequently converted and redesignated again as the 94th Field Artillery Battalion and relieved from assignment to the 11th Constabulary regiment. The 94th Field Artillery was inactivated on 20 May 1949 and later reactivated on 15 June 1954 at Fort Hood, Texas once again a part of the 4th Armored Division. The unit was relieved from assignment to the 4th Armored Division on 1 April 1957 and was reorganized and redesignated as the 94th Artillery, a parent regiment under the Combat Arms Regimental System.

The battalion was activated on 25 June 1963 in Germany and relieved on 10 May 1971 from assignment to the 4th Armored Division and assigned to the 1st Armored Division.It was again redesignated as the 94th Field Artillery on 1 September 1971. The 94th Field Artillery fought with distinction in Vietnam, earning 14 campaign streamers from 1966 to 1971. The 94th Field Artillery deployed with the 1st Armored Division to Southwest Asia during Operation Desert Shield/Storm. The 94th Field Artillery was again inactivated on 15 January 1992, only to be reactivated on 16 July 1995 to the 1st Armored Division in Germany as Alpha Battery, 94th Field Artillery (MLRS). On 16 September 2000 the Field Artillery was redesignated as the 1st Battalion, 94th Field Artillery (MLS/TA) and deployed with the 1st Armored division to Iraq for 15 months from April 2003 to July 2004, in support of Operation Iraqi Freedom. The unit then deployed in support of Joint Task Force – East to Romania and Bulgaria from August to October 2007 and exercise Stable Guardian in Poland in December 2007. On 29 May 2008, the 94th Field Artillery cased its colors on Strassburg Kaseme in Idar-Oberstein, Germany for its re-stationing to JBLM, WA. In June 2011, Alpha Battery 1-94 FAR deployed to Iraq for Operation New Dawn for a six-month rotation in support of Operation Iraqi Freedom. Simultaneously, Charlie Battery 1-94 FAR deployed to Kuwait in support of the defense of the Arabian peninsula, and Bravo Battery and 125 FSC deployed to Jordan, all for one year deployments. In December 2013, the battalion deployed to the CENTCOM AOR for a nine-month deployment to Camp Redleg, UAE in support of GWOT. Upon redeployment in September 2014 to JBLM, the unit reset and retrained for any follow-on missions. Coming out of the COVID-19 PANDEMIC, the battalion continued to shift focus to gunnery, culminating in a BN FTX during January 2021. Throughout 2021, 1-94 FAR also participated in joint training exercises across the INDOPACOM AOR to include missions in Japan, Australia, Indonesia, and Thailand in support of Exercises ORIENT SHIELD, TALISMAN SABRE, GARUDA SHIELD, and COBRA GOLD. They continue to build on past exercises and missions and are preparing for both missions in Thailand and the Philippines in 2022.

In 2022, 1-94 FAR continues to build strategic alliances by participating in a Subject Matter Expert Exchange (SMEE) and Bi-lateral HIRAIN exercises in the Philippines, Thailand, and Indonesia during Exercises SALAKNIB BALIKATAN, COBRA GOLD, and GARUDA SHIELD. In addition, Bravo Battery "BULLDOGS" conducted training in Anchorage, Alaska, testing the Platoon's capabilities of the High Mobility Artillery Rocket System (HIMARS) in extreme-cold weather conditions as part of JPMRC 22–05.

== Current Status of Regimental Elements ==
- 1st Battalion, 94th Field Artillery Regiment (United States)- active, assigned to the 17th Field Artillery Brigade
- 2nd Battalion, 94th Field Artillery Regiment (United States)- inactive since 31 July 1972
- Battery C, 94th Field Artillery Regiment (United States)- inactive since 2 October 1986
- Battery D, 94th Field Artillery Regiment (United States)- inactive since 21 December 1975

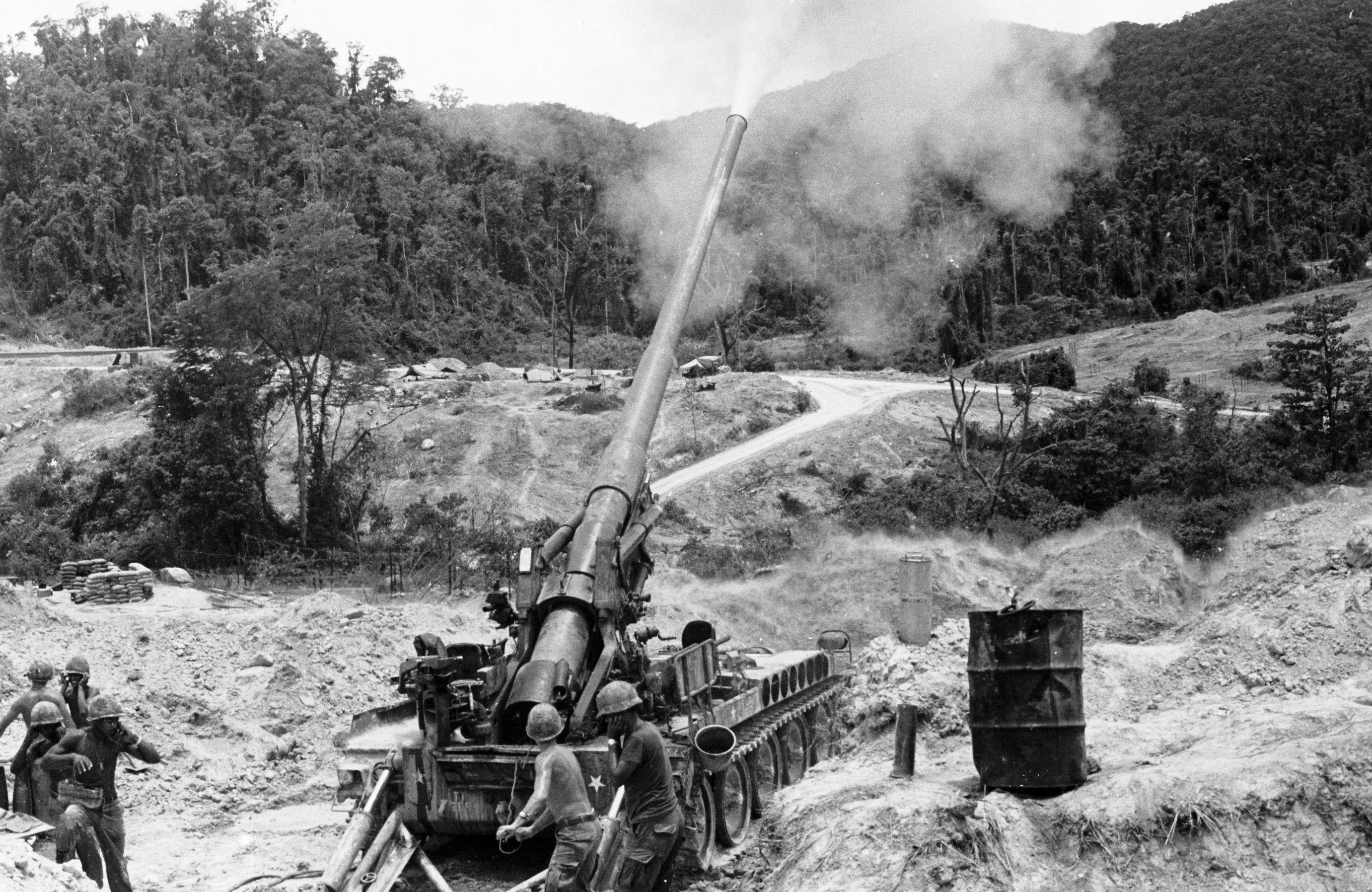
M107 self-propelled gun of "A" Battery, 2nd Battalion, 94th Artillery fires in support of Marines in the A Shau valley, 1 August 1967

== Lineage and honors ==
=== Lineage ===
- Constituted 1 October 1933 in the Regular Army as the 94th Field Artillery
- Redesignated 1 January 1942 as the 94th Armored Field Artillery Battalion
- Assigned 6 January 1942 to the 4th Armored Division and activated at Pine Camp, New York
- Converted and redesignated 1 May 1946 as the 94th Constabulary Squadron; concurrently relieved from assignment to the 4th Armored Division and assigned to the 11th Constabulary Regiment
- Converted and redesignated 6 January 1948 as the 94th Field Artillery Battalion and relieved from assignment to the 11th Constabulary Regiment
- Inactivated 20 May 1949 in Germany; concurrently redesignated as the 94th Armored Field Artillery Battalion and assigned to the 4th Armored Division
- Activated 15 June 1954 at Fort Hood, Texas
- Relieved 1 April 1957 from assignment to the 4th Armored Division; concurrently reorganized and redesignated as the 94th Artillery, a parent regiment under the Combat Arms Regimental System
- Redesignated 1 September 1971 as the 94th Field Artillery
- Withdrawn 16 November 1986 from the Combat Arms Regimental System and reorganized under the United States Army Regimental System

=== Campaign participation credit ===
- World War II: Normandy; Northern France; Rhineland; Ardennes-Alsace; Central Europe
- Vietnam: Counteroffensive, Phase II; Counteroffensive, Phase III; Tet Counteroffensive; Counteroffensive, Phase IV; Counteroffensive, Phase V; Counteroffensive, Phase VI; Tet 69/Counteroffensive; Summer–Fall 1969; Winter–Spring 1970; Sanctuary Counteroffensive; Counteroffensive, Phase VII; Consolidation I; Consolidation II; Cease-Fire
- Southwest Asia: Defense of Saudi Arabia; Liberation and Defense of Kuwait; Cease-Fire
- War on Terrorism

=== Decorations ===
- Presidential Unit Citation (Army) for ARDENNES
- Valorous Unit Award for IRAQ 2003–2004
- Meritorious Unit Commendation (Army) for SOUTHWEST ASIA 1990–1991
- Army Superior Unit Award for 1995–1996
- French Croix de Guerre with Palm, World War II for NORMANDY
- French Croix de Guerre with Palm, World War II for MOSELLE RIVER
- French Croix de Guerre, World War II, Fourragere

== Distinctive unit insignia ==
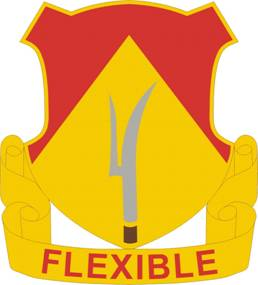

- Description: A Gold color metal and enamel device 1 1/8 inches (2.9 cm) in height overall consisting of a shield blazoned: Per chevron Gules and Or, issuant from base a guisarme in pale Proper. Attached below and to the sides of the shield a Gold scroll inscribed "FLEXIBLE" in Red letters.
- Symbolism: The shield is divided scarlet and yellow, scarlet being the Artillery color and yellow the color of Artillery guidon markings. The charge shown is known as a guisarme, a weapon used in ancient times to reach the enemy behind the defense. It symbolizes the operations of the organization.
- Background: The distinctive unit insignia was originally approved for the 94th Armored Field Artillery Battalion on 1 August 1942. It was redesignated for the 94th Constabulary Squadron on 4 December 1946. It was redesignated for the 94th Field Artillery Battalion on 9 May 1949. The insignia was redesignated for the 94th Armored Field Artillery Battalion on 5 October 1955. It was redesignated for the 94th Artillery Regiment on 24 June 1963. Effective 1 September 1971, the insignia was redesignated for the 94th Field Artillery Regiment.

== Coat of arms ==
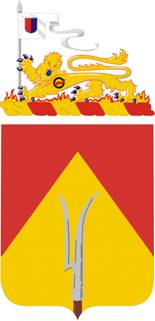

- Blazon
  - Shield: Per chevron Gules and Or, issuant from base a guisarme in pale Proper.
  - Crest: On a wreath Or and Gules, issuing from four flames of fire Proper, a lion passant guardant Or armed and langued Azure charged on the shoulder with an annulet of the last surmounted by a lightning flash of the second the dexter paw supporting a lance Argent flotant to sinister therefrom a banner the upper third extended to form a streamer of the like bearing an escutcheon parti per pale of the second and third.
  - Motto: FLEXIBLE.
- Symbolism
  - Shield: The shield is divided scarlet and yellow, scarlet being the Artillery color and yellow the color of Artillery guidon markings. The charge shown is known as a guisarme, a weapon used in ancient times to reach the enemy behind the defense. It symbolizes the operations of the organization.
  - Crest: The crest commemorates the unit's combat action in World War II and subsequent service in Germany with the United States Constabulary. The lion is taken from the arms of Normandy where the organization initially contacted the enemy. The four flames of fire refer to the unit's four decorations. The scarlet and blue shield, taken from the arms of Bastogne, and the white color of the banner, alluding to snow, refers to the organization's participation in the rescue of Bastogne in heavy snow fall during the Ardennes Campaign. The banner is of a type frequently used in Europe in the Middle Ages. The annulet and lightning flash, simulating the insignia of the United States Constabulary, allude to the unit's postwar service in Germany.
- Background: The coat of arms was originally approved for the 94th Armored Field Artillery Battalion on 1 August 1942. It was redesignated for the 94th Constabulary Squadron on 3 December 1946. It was redesignated for the 94th Field Artillery Battalion on 9 May 1949. The insignia was redesignated for the 94th Armored Field Artillery Battalion on 5 October 1955. It was redesignated for the 94th Artillery Regiment on 24 June 1963. It was amended to add a crest on 12 March 1965. Effective 1 September 1971, the insignia was redesignated for the 94th Field Artillery Regiment. It was amended to correct the blazon of the crest on 15 September 2004.

== See also ==
- Field Artillery Branch (United States)
- U.S. Army Coast Artillery Corps
