= Cardenas J. Alban =

United States Army soldier and murderer (born 1975)

Cardenas J. Alban (born 1975) is a former Staff Sergeant in the United States Army from Inglewood, California who was convicted of the murder of Qassim Hassan, a sixteen-year-old Iraqi. The teenager was found with severe abdominal injuries and burns, and the shooting was described as a "mercy killing." Alban was sentenced to one year's confinement, demoted to Private and given a bad conduct discharge. Johnny M. Horne Jr. pleaded guilty in the same case. The murder occurred in August 2004, and the guilty plea followed in October 2004.
