= 308th Brigade Support Battalion =

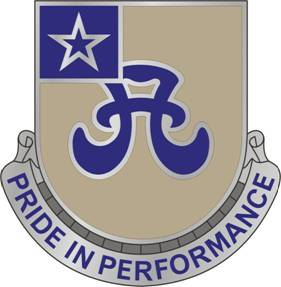
- Distinctive unit insignia
- Active: 1943–45; 1961–71; 2007–present
- Country: United States
- Allegiance: United States Army
- Branch: Active Army
- Type: Support
- Role: Support
- Size: Battalion
- Part of: 17th Field Artillery Brigade
- Garrison/HQ: Joint Base Lewis-McChord, Washington, United States
- Nickname: "Red Lions"
- Motto: "Pride in Performance!"
- Anniversaries: 26 April (Birthday)
- Engagements: Normandy Campaign; Northern France Campaign; Rhineland Campaign; Ardennes-Alsace Campaign; Central Europe Campaign; Iraq Campaign

Insignia
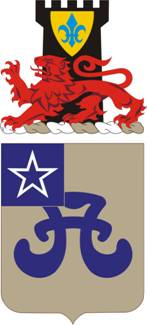
- Coat of Arms

The 308th Brigade Support Battalion is a U.S. Army battalion was formed 23 February as the 308th Quartermaster Sterilization Battalion at Vancouver Barracks, Washington. The battalion was broken up 1 August 1943 and reorganized and Headquarters and Headquarters Detachment was re designated as the 308th Quartermaster Fumigation and Bath Battalion. The other companies became the 855th, 856th, 857th, and 858th Quartermaster Fumigation and Bath Companies. On 1 November 1943, the 308th was once again reorganized and re designated as the Headquarters and Headquarters Detachment, 308th Quartermaster Battalion. The battalion took part in World War II in the Normandy, Northern France, Rhineland, Ardennes-Alsace, and Central Europe campaigns, and was inactivated 25 November 1945 in Austria.

The 308th Quartermaster Battalion was reformed on 14 September 1961 as part of the Regular Army and activated 25 September 1961 in Germany. The battalion was reorganized and re designated 2 August 1965 as the 308th Supply and Service Battalion, and inactivated 26 July 1971 in Germany.

On 15 June 2005 the 308th Support Battalion was again organised and activated 18 July 2007 at Fort Lewis, Washington in support of the 17th Fires Brigade.
