= 17th Field Artillery Brigade =

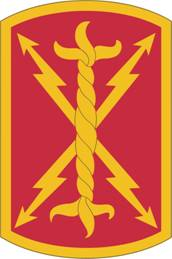
- 17th Field Artillery Brigade shoulder sleeve insignia
- Active: 19 August 1918 – 8 February 1919; 19 January 1943 – 15 November 1945; 22 January 1951 – 21 June 1975; 21 September 1978—present
- Country: United States
- Branch: United States Army
- Role: Field Artillery
- Size: Brigade
- Part of: I Corps
- Garrison/HQ: Joint Base Lewis-McChord
- Nickname: Thunderbolt Brigade
- Motto: "Thunderbolt!"

Insignia
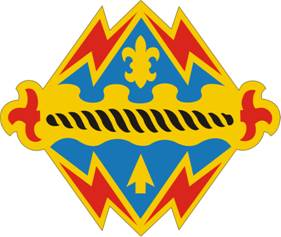
- Distinctive Unit Insignia

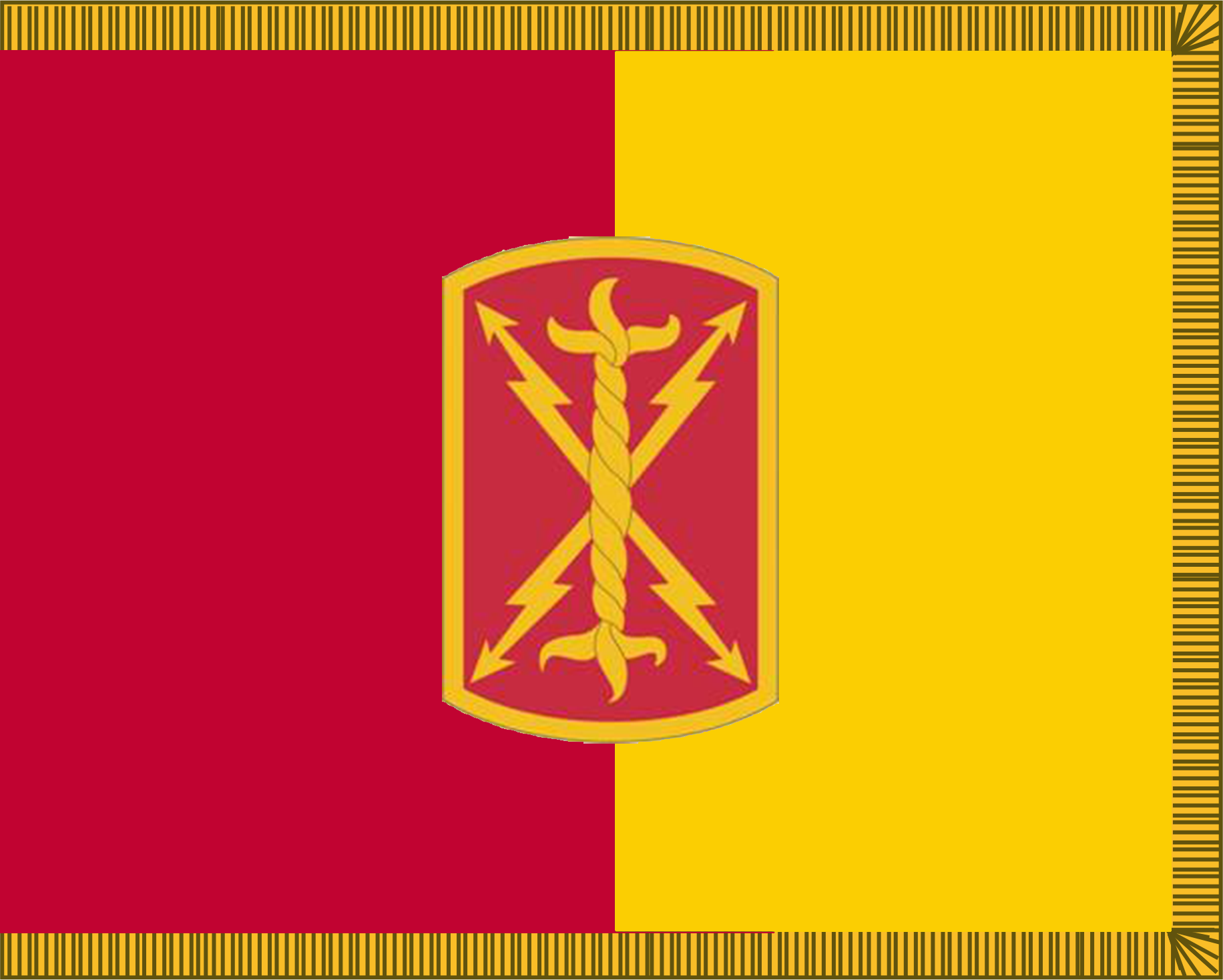
- 17th Artillery Brigade Flag

The 17th Field Artillery Brigade, "America's Premier HIMARS Brigade", is an artillery brigade in the United States Army. It is currently based in Joint Base Lewis McChord Washington as Force Fires Headquarters for I Corps.

== History ==
The 17th Field Artillery Brigade began as part of the 17th Division at Camp Bowie, Texas on 31 July 1918. It demobilized in February 1919 after World War I.

The 17th Field Artillery Brigade activated again at Fort Sill January 1943. During World War II the 17th Field Artillery Brigade participated in Normandy, Northern France, Rhineland, Ardennes-Alsace, and Central Europe.

- Staged at Camp Myles Standish from 20 February 1944.
- Departed Boston, Massachusetts Port of Embarkation on 28 February 1944.
- Arrived in England on 8 March 1944.
- Landed in France on 12 June 1944 and entered the Normandy campaign.
- Normandy Campaign concluded on 24 July 1944.
- Northern France campaign started July 1944.
- Crossed into Belgium on 5 September 1944.
- Northern France campaign concluded on 14 September 1944.
- Entered Germany on 15 September 1944 and started Rhineland campaign.
- Returned to Belgium on 1 October 1944.
- Reentered Germany on 1 November 1944.
- Returned to Belgium on 23 December 1944 to participate in the Ardennes-Alsace campaign.
- Reentered Germany on 4 February 1945, and resumed Rhineland campaign.
- Rhineland Campaign concluded on 21 March 1945.
- Central Europe campaign starts 22 March 1945.
- Central Europe campaign concluded 11 May 1945, and unit prepares to be withdrawn from ETO, and deployment to PTO.
- Unit withdrawn from Germany, and arrived Hampton Roads Port of Embarkation to prepare for invasion of Japan on 9 July 1945
- Unit moved to Camp San Luis Obispo, California on 15 July 1945 to train and re-equip for Pacific Theater.
- Unit at Camp San Luis Obispo on VJ Day.
- Unit moved to Fort Ord, California for demobilization on 20 September 1945.
- Inactivated 15 November 1945 at Fort Ord

The 17th Field Artillery Brigade activated at Fort Campbell, Kentucky 22 January 1951.

The unit was redesigned 21 March 1978 as Headquarters and Headquarters Battery, 17th Field Artillery Group.

The 17th Field Artillery deployed to Iraq from Fort Sill, OK in 2003 and again in 2005. In 2007 the 17th Field Artillery Brigade moved to Fort Lewis, Washington a renamed 17th Fires Brigade.

The 17th Fires Brigade deployed to the Basra Province in the summer of 2009.

The unit was designated as a subordinate unit to 7th Infantry Division, 1 October 2012

The 1st Battalion, 377th Field Artillery Regiment was officially inactivated February 2014.

For the purpose of standardizing, the 17th Fires Brigade was officially renamed 17th Field Artillery Brigade on 19 February 2014.

== Lineage and honors ==
=== Lineage ===
- Constituted 31 July 1918 in the Regular Army as Headquarters, 17th Field Artillery Brigade, and assigned to the 17th Division
- Organized 19 August 1918 at Camp Bowie, Texas
- Demobilized 8 February 1919 at Fort Sill, Oklahoma
- Reconstituted 12 October 1936 in the Regular Army; concurrently consolidated with Headquarters and Headquarters Battery, 17th Field Artillery Brigade (constituted 1 October 1933 in the Regular Army), and consolidated unit designated as Headquarters and Headquarters Battery, 17th Field Artillery Brigade
- Activated 19 January 1943 at Fort Sill, Oklahoma
- Reorganized, redesignated, and joined 13 March 1944 as Headquarters and Headquarters Battery, VII Corps Artillery
- Inactivated 15 November 1945 at Fort Ord, California
- Activated 22 January 1951 at Fort Campbell, Kentucky
- Inactivated 21 June 1975 in Germany
- Redesignated 21 March 1978 as Headquarters and Headquarters Battery, 17th Field Artillery Brigade
- Activated 21 September 1978 in Augsburg, Germany
- Reorganized and redesignated 17 July 2007 as Headquarters and Headquarters Battery, 17th Fires Brigade

=== Campaign participation credit ===
- World War II: Normandy Campaign (with arrowhead); Northern France Campaign; Rhineland Campaign; Ardennes-Alsace Campaign; Central Europe Campaign
- War on Terrorism: Campaigns to be determined

=== Decorations ===
- Meritorious Unit Commendation (Army), Streamer embroidered IRAQ 2005–2006

== Assigned and Attached Units ==
The 17th Field Artillery Brigade is currently composed of the following units:

- Headquarters and Headquarters Battery
- 1st Battalion, 3rd Field Artillery Regiment (HIMARS)
- 1st Battalion, 94th Field Artillery Regiment (HIMARS)
- 308th Brigade Support Battalion
