= Joint Base Lewis–McChord =

US military installation near Tacoma, Washington, US

Joint Base Lewis–McChord
- Near Lakewood, Washington
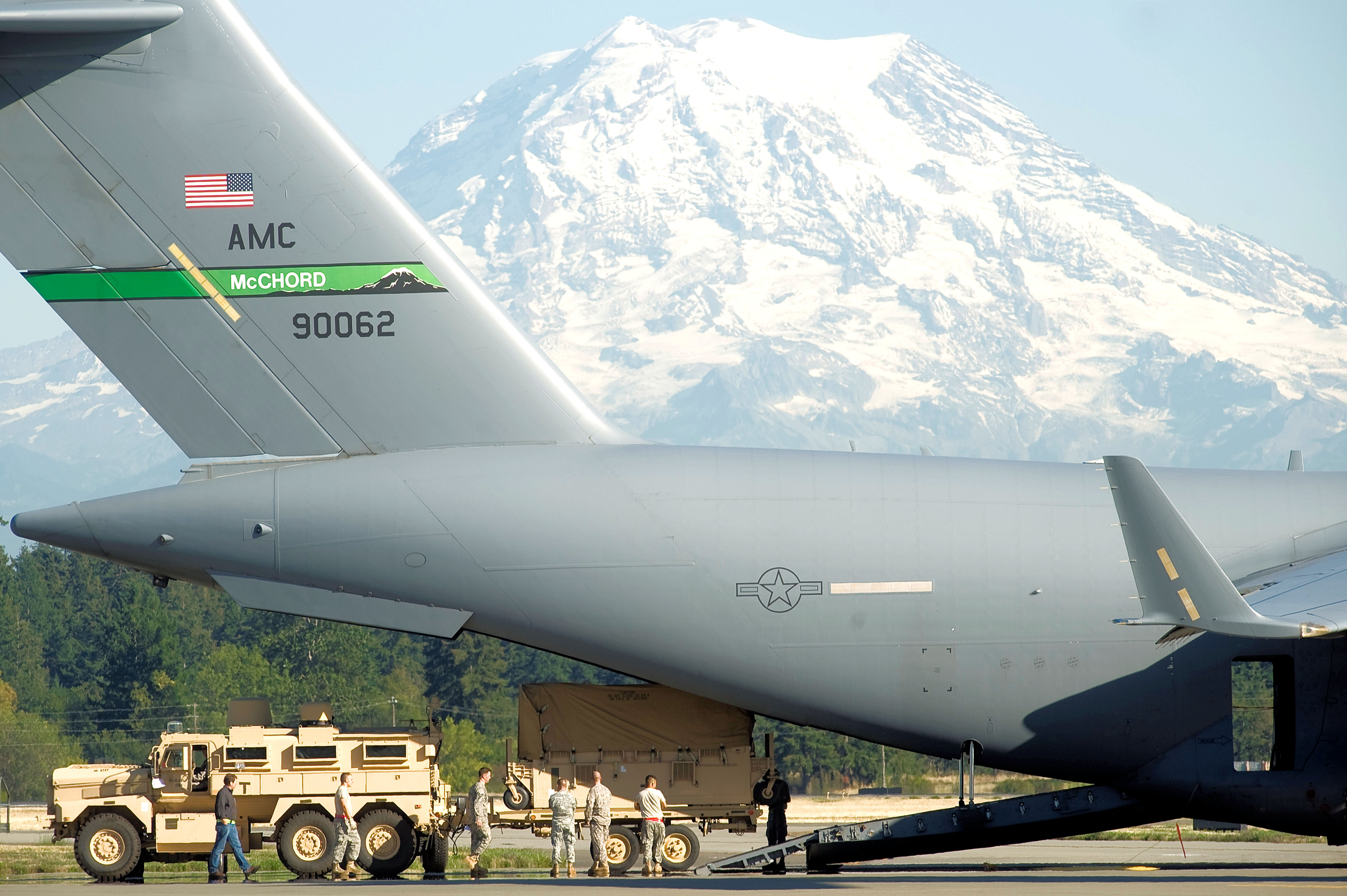
- C-17 with Mount Rainier in the background.

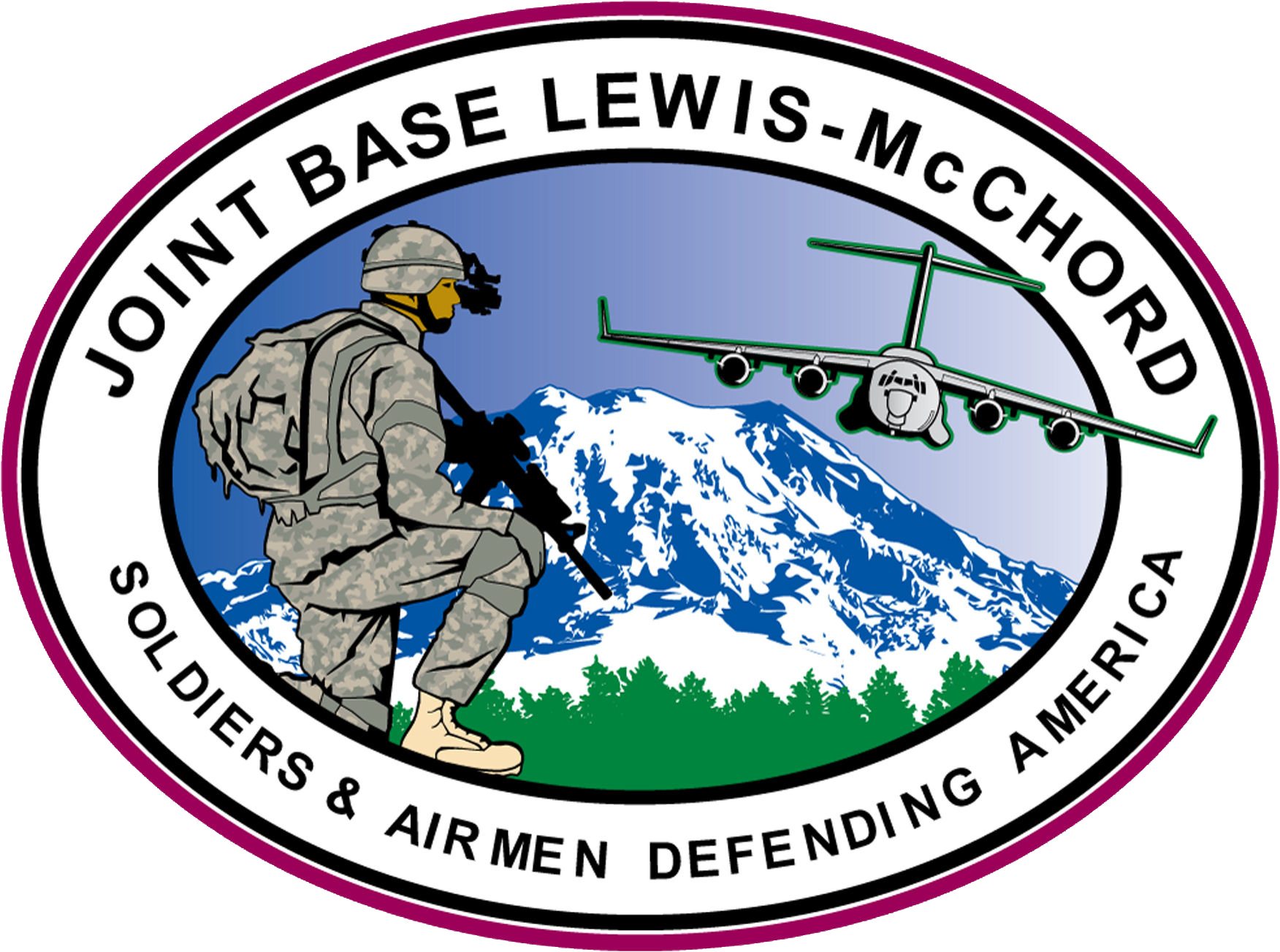

Site information
- Type: Joint base
- Operator: United States Army
- Controlled by: United States Department of Defense
- Open to the public: No
- Website: home.army.mil/lewis-mcchord/

Location
- Location in the United States
- Coordinates: 47°06′21″N 122°33′52″W

Site history
- Built: 1917–1927
- Built by: U.S. Army Quartermaster Corps
- In use: 1917–present
- Events: World War I, World War II, Cold War, Global War on Terrorism

Garrison information
- Current commander: Col. Phil Lamb, USA
- Occupants: I Corps; 62nd Airlift Wing; 1st Special Forces Group; 2nd Ranger Battalion

Airfield information
- Identifiers: IATA: TCM, ICAO: KTCM, FAA LID: TCM
- Elevation: 98.1 metres (322 ft) AMSL
Runways
Direction	Length and surface
16/34	3,080.9 metres (10,108 ft) Asphalt/Concrete
Assault Strip	914.4 metres (3,000 ft) Asphalt
- Other Facilities: See Gray Army Airfield for its airfield data.

Joint Base Lewis–McChord (JBLM) is a U.S. installation located 9.1 miles (14.6 km) south-southwest of Tacoma, Washington, operated by the United States Army. The installation is an amalgamation of Fort Lewis and McChord Air Force Base, which merged on February 1, 2010, to form a joint base as a result of 2005 Base Realignment and Closure Commission recommendations. JBLM is home to I Corps and the 62nd Airlift Wing.

Joint Base Lewis–McChord is a training and mobilization center for all services and is the only Army power projection base west of the Rocky Mountains in the Continental United States. Its geographic location provides rapid access to the deepwater ports of Tacoma, Olympia, and Seattle for deploying equipment. Units can be deployed from McChord Field, and individuals and small groups can also use nearby Sea-Tac Airport. The strategic location of the base provides Air Force units with the ability to conduct combat and humanitarian airlift with the C-17 Globemaster III.

== Fort Lewis ==
Fort Lewis is a United States Army base located 9.1 miles (14.6 km) south-southwest of Tacoma, Washington. Fort Lewis was merged with McChord Air Force Base on February 1, 2010, to form Joint Base Lewis–McChord.

Fort Lewis, named after Meriwether Lewis of the Lewis and Clark Expedition, was one of the largest and most modern military reservations in the United States, consisting of 87,000 acres (136 sq mi; 350 km2) of prairie land cut from the glacier-flattened Nisqually Plain. It is the premier military installation in the northwest and is the most requested duty station in the Army.

Joint Base Lewis–McChord (Fort Lewis) is a major Army installation, with much of the 2nd Infantry Division in residence, along with Headquarters, 7th Infantry Division; 593rd Expeditionary Sustainment Command; 1st Special Forces Group; and 2nd Battalion, 75th Ranger Regiment. However, the Headquarters of the 7th Infantry Division is primarily a garrison management body. Fort Lewis's geographic location provides rapid access to the deep water ports of Tacoma, Olympia and Seattle for deploying equipment. Units can be deployed from McChord Field, and individuals and small groups can also use nearby Sea-Tac Airport. The strategic location of the base provide Air Force units with the ability to conduct combat and humanitarian airlifts with the C-17 Globemaster III.

== Fort Lewis Major units ==
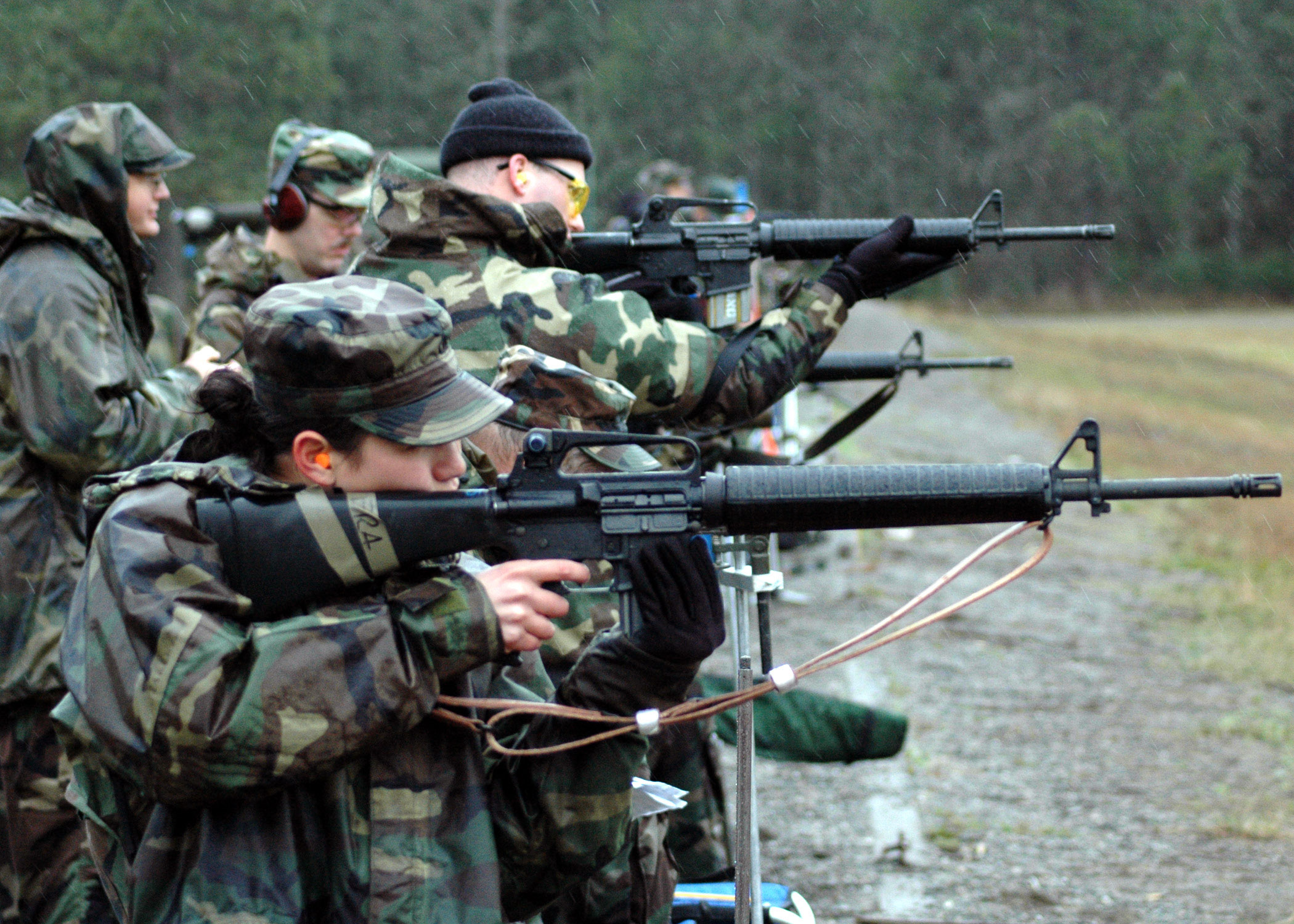
Rifle confidence training

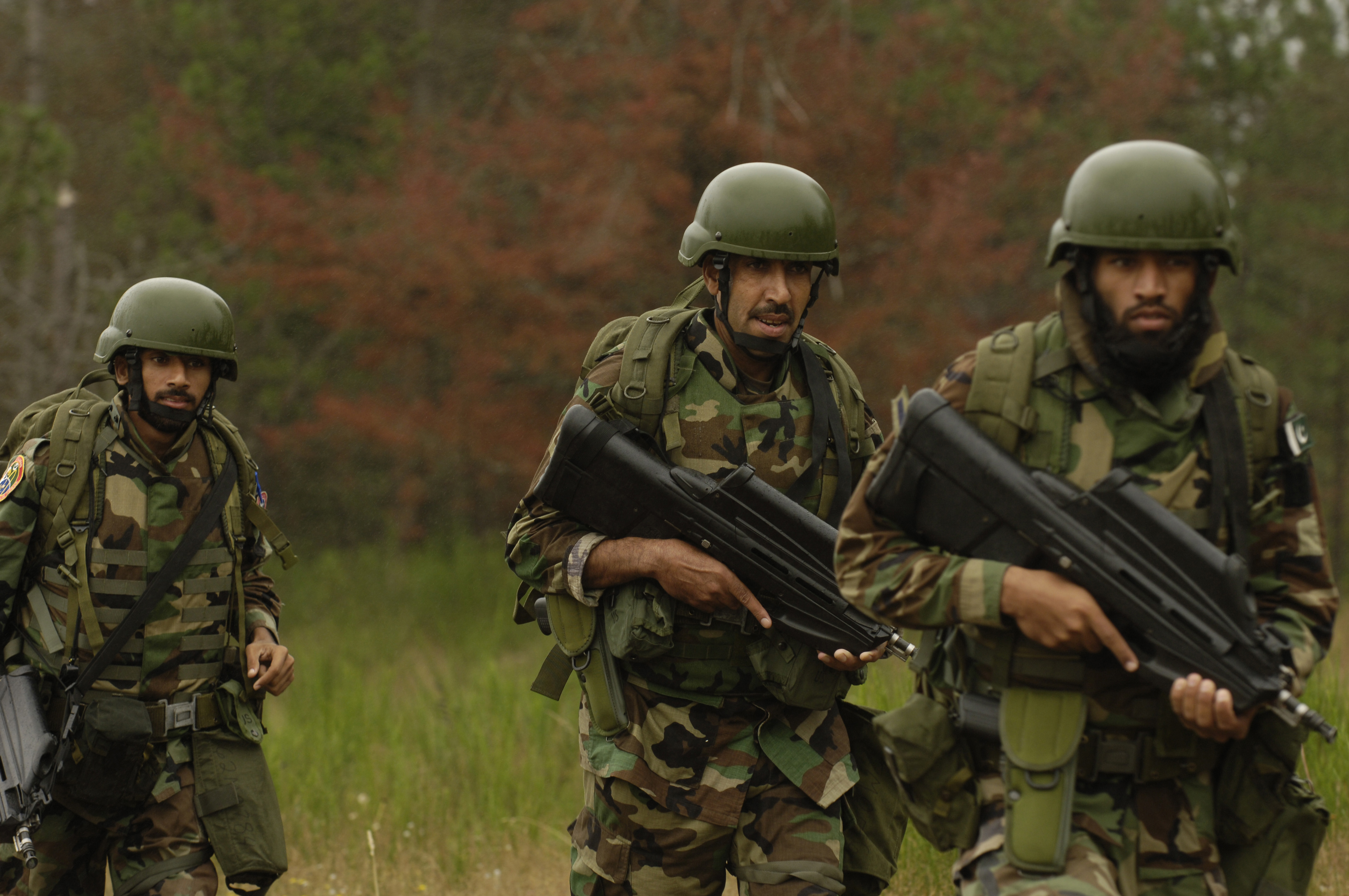
Pakistani Special Services Wing carrying FN F2000 rifles while on training at Fort Lewis, 23 July 2007.

The United States Army's I Corps commands most Army units at Joint Base Lewis–McChord, and conducts planning and liaison with other assigned active and Reserve component units in the continental United States. It is one of the active Army's contingency corps. I Corps stays prepared to deploy on short notice worldwide to command up to five divisions or a joint task force.

In 1981, I Corps was reactivated at Fort Lewis. On 12 October 1999, General Eric K. Shinseki, Chief of Staff of the Army, announced I Corps would lead the acceleration of Army transformation, training and the initial creation of the first two Stryker Brigade Combat Teams at Fort Lewis. Since 11 September 2001, I Corps and Fort Lewis assets have been active in providing support for global war on terrorism operations, including Operation Noble Eagle (Homeland Defense), Operation Enduring Freedom (Afghanistan) and the Iraq War.

On 5 February 2004, Task Force Olympia was activated, as a sub-element of I Corps headquarters with the mission to command forward-deployed units in Iraq. This marked the first time that I Corps had forward soldiers in combat since the end of the Korean War. Task Force Olympia included units from all three components of the Army (Active, Reserve and National Guard) as well as Marine and Australian officers. Task Force Olympia's subordinate units included the 3rd Stryker Brigade Combat Team, 2nd Infantry Division, which deployed for Iraq on 8 November 2003, and returned to Fort Lewis after one year of combat duty, and the 1st Brigade, 25th Infantry Division, which departed Fort Lewis on 15 September 2004, for one year and returned September 2005. On 1 June 2006, the 1st Brigade, 25th Infantry Division cased its colors and became the 2d Cavalry Regiment – Stryker Brigade Combat Team with its home station in Germany. A new unit then uncased the colors of its new designation on 1 June 2006 – the 4th Brigade, 2d Infantry Division.

Subordinate units assigned to Fort Lewis are:

- 7th Infantry Division
  - 1st Brigade, 2nd Infantry Division
  - 2nd Brigade, 2nd Infantry Division
  - 17th Field Artillery Brigade
  - 16th Combat Aviation Brigade
  - 201st Expeditionary Military Intelligence Brigade
  - 555th Engineer Brigade
- 593rd Expeditionary Sustainment Command
  - 42nd Military Police Brigade (inactivation ceremony held on 29 May 2025)
  - 62nd Medical Brigade
- Henry H. Lind Noncommissioned Officer Academy
- 404th Army Field Support Brigade
- Eighth Brigade, U.S. Army Cadet Command (ROTC)
- 189th Infantry Brigade (First Army, DIVWEST)
- 6th Military Police Group (CID)
- Washington Regional Flight Center
- Western Regional Medical Command
- Public Health Command Region-West
- KIM Dental Activity
- Veterinary Treatment Facility
- Special Operations Command (Airborne) units based at Joint Base Lewis–McChord
  - 1st Special Forces Group (Airborne)
  - 2nd Battalion, 75th Ranger Regiment
  - 4th Battalion 160th Special Operations Aviation Regiment (Airborne)

== McChord Air Force Base ==
The McChord Air Force Base (AFB) is a United States Air Force controlled base in the northwest United States, in Pierce County, Washington. South of Tacoma, McChord AFB is the home of the 62d Airlift Wing, Air Mobility Command, the airbase's primary mission being worldwide strategic airlift.

The facility was consolidated with the U.S. Army's Fort Lewis on 1 February 2010 to become part of the Joint Base Lewis–McChord complex. This initiative was driven by the Base Realignment and Closure Round in 2005 and is designed to combine current infrastructure into one maximizing war fighting capability and efficiency, while saving taxpayer dollars.

== 62d Airlift Wing ==
The 62nd Airlift Wing (62 AW) is the host unit at McChord AFB. It is assigned to the Eighteenth Air Force and is composed of more than 7,200 active duty military and civilian personnel. It is tasked with supporting worldwide combat and humanitarian airlift contingencies. Aircraft of the 62d fly around the globe, conducting airdrop training; it also carries out the Antarctic resupply missions.

=== Components ===
The 62d Operations Group flies the C-17 Globemaster III transport from McChord Field. It consists of three airlift squadrons and an Operations Support Squadron. Air Mobility Command

- 62d Airlift Wing
  - 4th Airlift Squadron
  - 7th Airlift Squadron
  - 8th Airlift Squadron
  - 10th Airlift Squadron
  - 62d Operations Support Squadron (62 OSS)
  - 62d Maintenance Group (62 MXG)
  - 627th Air Base Group (627 ABG)
  - 62d Medical Squadron (62 MDS)
  - 62d Comptroller Squadron (62 CPTS)

Other major units stationed at McChord Field are:

- Western Air Defense Sector
- 262d Cyberspace Operations Squadron
- 361st Recruiting Squadron
- 373d Training Squadron

Air Force Special Operations Command

- 22nd Special Tactics Squadron

Air Force Reserve Command

- 446th Airlift Wing (USAFR)
  - 446th Operations Group
  - 97th Airlift Squadron
  - 313th Airlift Squadron
  - 728th Airlift Squadron
  - 446th Aeromedical Evacuation Squadron
- 446th Mission Support Group
  - 446th Maintenance Group
  - 446th Aerospace Medicine Squadron
  - 446th Aeromedical Staging Squadron
  - 446th Maintenance Squadron

== History ==
=== Fort Lewis ===
In 1916, a combination of local civilian businessmen seeking the creation of a military base in the Puget Sound area and a military survey team approved a military post to be constructed near American Lake. Businessmen and Washington voters approved a donation of the land near American Lake to the United States government. The base (then known as Camp Lewis) would serve as a vital training base for United States soldiers during World War I. This base would be known as one of the most well-managed and cheaply funded bases that were constructed during World War I. Additional construction of the camp would officially commemorate a renaming of Camp Lewis to Fort Lewis in 1927.

The construction of the base also included the seizure of Nisqually tribe reservation lands for their use as an artillery field. Legal seizure of the lands occurred through eminent domain and seizure, which resulted in tribal members being forced from their homes.

Units trained at Fort Lewis would serve with distinction in both the Pacific and European theaters during World War II. Prisoner of war compounds were constructed to house German and Italian POWs until the end of the war. Fort Lewis units also participated in major operations in the modern-day, including Operation Just Cause and Operations Desert Shield and Desert Storm.

=== McChord Air Force Base ===
McChord Air Force Base was originally named Tacoma Field in 1927 when a local voting measure voted to create a municipal airport. This airport would be purchased by the United States government in 1938 and renamed McChord Field in May 1938 in honor of Colonel William McChord, who had died in an aircraft accident in Virginia. The early work and construction of the base prior to the start of World War II occurred under the Works Projects Administration. McChord Field served as a critical piece of defense infrastructure during World War II, training bomber aircraft pilots who would participate in the allied invasion of Italy, southern France, and the Doolittle Raid. McChord Field became McChord Air Force Base in 1948 with the formation of the United States Air Force as a separate division of the armed forces from the United States Army.

McChord Air Force Base served as an airlift base since the end of World War II. The base functions as a strategic airlift base participating in transport (such as in Operation Desert Shield), humanitarian (such as relief during 1992 typhoons, support during the eruption of Mount St. Helens in 1980, and support to New Orleans after Hurricane Katrina), and air defense roles (such as military interception in the aftermath of the 9/11 attacks).

Fort Lewis and McChord Air Force Base officially joined to form Joint Base Lewis McChord in 2010 following the apolitical Base Realignment and Closure Commissions recommendations in 2005.

== Geography and environment ==
The large protected lands available to military reservations makes environmental protection significantly important worldwide. Both Fort Lewis and McChord Air Force Base lands have been used as areas to conduct significant environmental studies. The use of military equipment on the base reservation contains the potential to damage environmental habitats. United States military facilities have implemented and continue to implement practices that include environmental preservation and protections.

== Joint Base Headquarters ==
The Joint Base Headquarters (JBHQ) operates the installation to support the warfighting units, their families and the extended military community. The mission of the JBHQ is to provide support to mission commanders and the joint base community, to serve as an enabler to the soldiers as they train and project America's combat power, and to make JBLM the station of choice for American soldiers and their families.

With an Army joint base commander and an Air Force deputy joint base commander, the JBHQ supports the installation through directorates and agencies that provide a full range of city services and quality-of-life functions; everything from facility maintenance recreation and family programs to training support and emergency services.

The major organizations that make up the bulk of the JBHQ include:

- Directorates of Public Works: Logistics
- Family and Morale, Welfare and Recreation
- Human Resources; Emergency Services
- Directorate of Plans, Training, Mobilization, and Security (DPTMS)

Additional staff offices that support the installation mission include the Joint Base Public Affairs Office, the Religious Support Office, the Resource Management Office, Equal Employment Opportunity Office, the Joint Base Safety Office and the Plans, Analysis and Integration Office. Other partners who work closely with the JBHQ include the Civilian Personnel Advisory Center, the Mission and Installation Contracting Command and Joint Personal Property Shipping Office.

Two military units support the JBHQ

- 627th Air Base Group

Provides command and control and administrative oversight to the Airmen who perform installation support duties on behalf of the Joint Base Commander.

- Headquarters and Headquarters Company, JBLM

Provides administrative oversight to the Army personnel in the JBHQ and supports newly arrived soldiers during their in-processing period.

JBLM Service Members receive medical care through on-base facilities such as Madigan Army Medical Center, the Okubo Clinic, the Nisqually Clinic, and the McChord Clinic.

In 2010, Joint Base Lewis–McChord was called the U.S. military's "most troubled base" 2010 by Stars and Stripes newspaper. By 2015, the base had changed its public image, winning recognition in the Army Communities of Excellence awards program with a Silver Award in 2012, and Bronze Awards in 2013 and 2014.

=== JBLM overview ===
JBLM has two Senior Service Component Commanders, one Army (Commander, I Corps) and one Air Force (Commander, 62nd Airlift Wing), and has more than 45,000 service members and civilian workers. The post supports over 120,000 military retirees and more than 29,000 family members living both on and off post. The base has a total active population of nearly 210,000 inhabitants, making it the fourth largest military installment worldwide by population. JBLM consists of four geographical areas, Lewis Main, Lewis North, McChord Field, and Yakima Training Center. Lewis Main, Lewis North and McChord Field cover over 86,000 acres (35,000 ha); while Yakima Training Center covers 324,000 acres (131,000 ha).

JBLM Lewis Main, Lewis North and McChord Field have abundant high-quality, close-in training areas, including 115 live-fire ranges. Additional training space is available at Yakima Training Center in eastern Washington, including maneuver areas and additional live-fire ranges.

In 2009, the former Fort Lewis Regional Correctional Facility was remodeled and renamed the Northwest Joint Regional Correctional Facility (NWJRCF). The facility houses minimum and medium security prisoners from all branches of the U.S. Armed Forces.

JBLM Lewis North hosted the Leader Development and Assessment Course, a capstone program for the U.S. Army's ROTC program until it was relocated to Fort Knox, KY in 2014.

Camp Murray (Washington National Guard) is adjacent to the post. McCants Hangar was dedicated in honor of Hershel Daniel McCants Jr.
