= 6th Military Police Group (United States) =

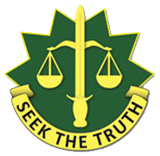
- Founded: March 9, 1965
- Country: United States
- Branch: United States Army
- Garrison/HQ: Joint Base Lewis–McChord
- Website: https://www.cid.army.mil/6th.html

Commanders
- Commander: COL Travis A. Jacobs
- Command Sergeant Major: CSM Jametta A. Bland
- Operations Officer: CW5 Keith McCullen

The 6th Military Police Group (or 6th MP Group) is a brigade-level federal law enforcement agency of the United States Department of the Army based in Joint Base Lewis–McChord and part of the United States Army Criminal Investigation Division (CID). Its primary function is to investigate felony crimes and serious violations of military law and the United States Code within the United States Army.

The 6th Military Police Group's area of responsibility includes all of the United States west of the Mississippi River as well as Korea and Japan.

== Mission and purpose ==
The 6th Military Police Group's stated purpose is:

The 6th Military Police Group (CID) conducts criminal investigations of serious, sensitive, or special interest matters to support commanders and preserve the Army’s resources in peacetime, combat, and contingency operations throughout the area of operation. Provide trained and ready units and/or personnel in support of CID operations in Afghanistan Theater of Operations and Kuwait Theater of Operations. Execute tactical control responsibilities for Title 10 investigations and investigative support operations and administrative control responsibilities for all operations for the deployed Afghanistan Theater of Operations battalion.

The special agents under the 6th MP Group do not fall under a given installation's regular chain of command, instead reporting directly to military police officers under the CID.

The 6th MP Group agents investigate felonies including deaths but are often specialized; there are dedicated personnel including a dedicated drug suppression team, sexual assault investigators and civilian victim advocates, and a suicide task force. The 6th MP Group also conducts preventative outreach programs such as with domestic violence intervention.

== History ==
The 6th MP Group was constituted on March 9, 1965, and activated on March 25, 1965, at the Presidio of San Francisco in California and deactivated on March 29, 1972. The 6th MP Group was reactivated on October 16, 1994, at Fort Lewis in Washington.

Elements of the 6th MP Group operated within Afghanistan as part of Operation Enduring Freedom.

After the murder of Vanessa Guillén at an armory at Fort Hood in 2020, an investigation found that issues with drugs and violent crime had gone unaddressed under the 6th MP Group at Fort Hood, largely due to the CID agents stationed at Fort Hood being understaffed and largely comprising new, inexperienced apprentice agents. The investigation also raised concerns about CID leadership comprising regular MP officers who are unaccustomed to running a specialized investigative unit like CID. An investigation into Fort Hood's leadership resulted in fourteen commanders and other leaders being relieved or suspended, and led to the formation of a People First Task Force which aims to address issues at Fort Hood and overall Army policy. A separate investigation was also conducted to review the available resources of the 6th MP Group at Fort Hood as well as their policies and procedures.

== Subordinate units ==
The 6th Military Police Group comprises three battalions:

- 11th Military Police Battalion (CID) has their battalion headquarters in Fort Hood, Texas and their area of responsibility covers Texas, New Mexico, Arizona and Oklahoma.
  - Arizona: Fort Huachuca
  - Oklahoma: Fort Sill
  - Texas: Fort Bliss, Fort Hood, and Joint Base San Antonio
- 19th Military Police Battalion (CID) has their battalion headquarters in Schofield Barracks, Hawaii and their area of responsibility covers Alaska, Hawaii, South Korea, Japan, and Okinawa.
  - Alaska: Fort Wainwright and Joint Base Elmendorf–Richardson
  - Hawaii: Schofield Barracks
  - Japan: Camp Zama and Torii Station
  - Korea: Korea Field Office, Camp Humphreys, Camp Red Cloud, Camp Casey, Camp Carroll, Daegu, Yongsan
- 22nd Military Police Battalion (CID) has their battalion headquarters in Joint Base Lewis–McChord and their area of responsibility covers California, Colorado, Kansas and Washington.
  - California: Fort Irwin National Training Center and Presidio of Monterey
  - Colorado: Fort Carson
  - Kansas: Fort Leavenworth and Fort Riley
  - Washington: Joint Base Lewis–McChord
