= 62nd Medical Brigade =

United States military unit

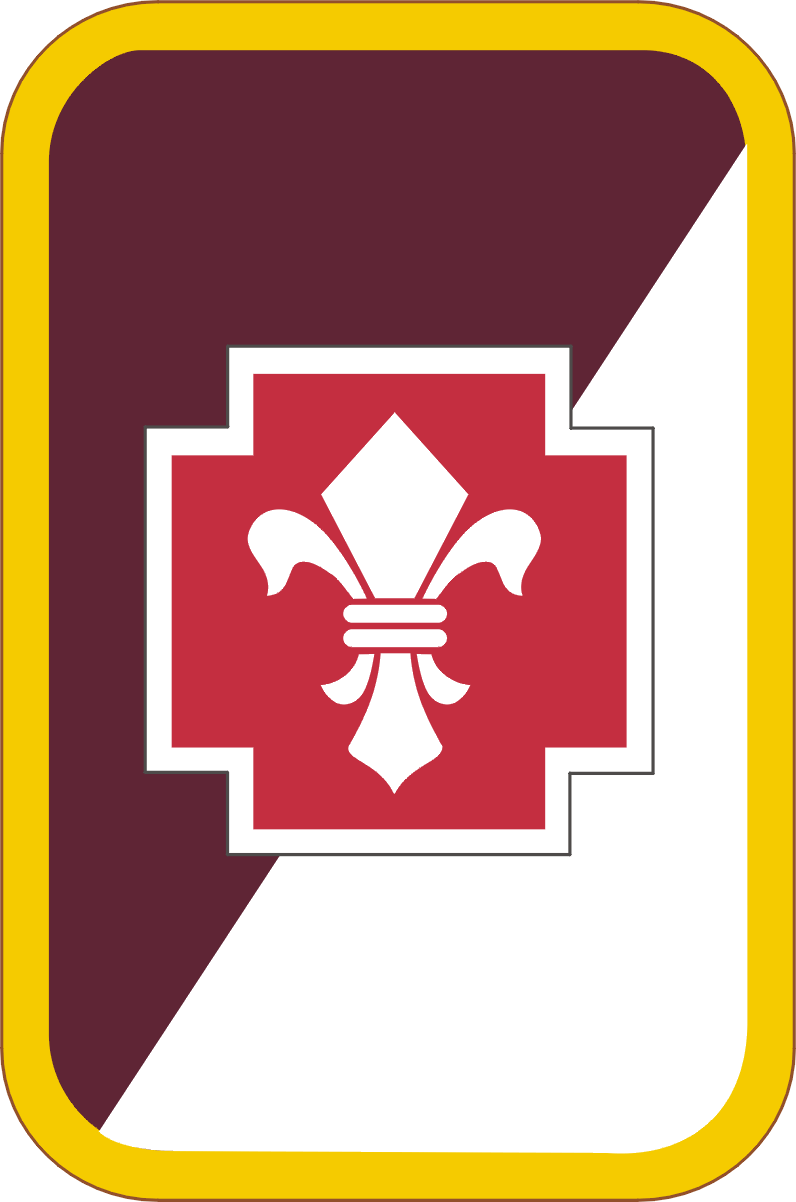
- Active: 1943 – present
- Country: United States
- Branch: United States Army
- Type: Medical
- Part of: I Corps
- Garrison/HQ: Joint Base Lewis-McChord
- Nickname: "America's Medics!"
- Mottos: Proud and Steadfast
- Engagements: World War II; Operation Desert Shield; Operation Restore Hope; Afghanistan; Iraq War

Commanders
- Current commander: COL Jason Hughes

Insignia
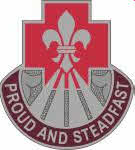
- Distinctive unit insignia

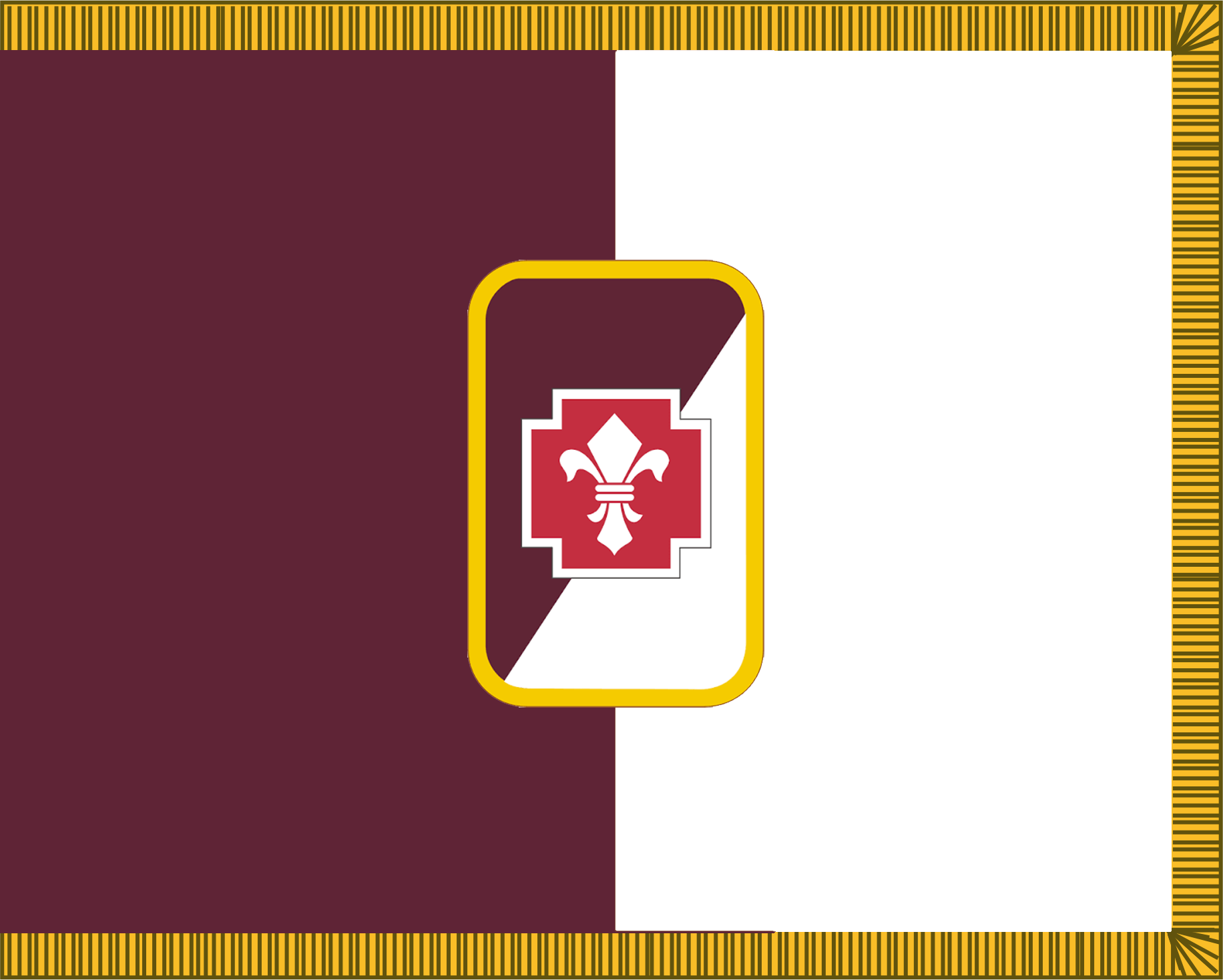
- 62nd Medical Brigade Flag

The 62nd Medical Brigade, (formerly the 62nd Medical Group) of the United States Army is a unit of the Medical Department, assigned to I Corps and stationed at Joint Base Lewis-McChord, Washington. Currently, the brigade is commanded by Colonel Jason W. Hughes. The command sergeant major is Jared R. Voller.

The commander's mission statement for the success of the brigade is the following:

Organize, train, equip, deploy, and command and control medical forces in support of global contingencies. Provide full and direct force health protection operations in support of forces engaged in full spectrum operations.

Most recently, the brigade has served as the Task Force Medical-Afghanistan headquarters and was pivotal to the US Government response to the COVID-19 pandemic.

== History ==
=== World War II ===
The Headquarters and Headquarters Company, 62nd Medical Brigade was originally constituted on 19 December 1942 as the 62nd Medical Battalion (Corps). It was activated on 25 January 1943 as the 62nd Medical Battalion, Motorized, at Fort Leonard Wood, Missouri.

On 15 September 1943, the battalion and its subordinate units were reorganized and re-designated as Headquarters Detachment, 62nd Medical Battalion, the 578th Ambulance Company, the 501st Collecting Company, the 502nd Collecting Company and the 635th Clearing Company.

During its service in WWII, the 62nd Medical Group participated in four campaigns: Normandy, Northern France, Rhineland, and Central Europe. The group headquarters was inactivated on 13 November 1945.

=== Post World War II ===
It was then reorganized and re-designated 8 October 1957 as the Headquarters and Headquarters Detachment, 62nd Medical Group, stationed at Bad Kreuznach, Rheinland Pfalz, Federal Republic of Germany, The 7th Medical Brigade was the next higher headquarters. After being stationed in Germany, HHD 62nd Medical Group had a permanent change of station to Fort Lewis, Washington in summer 1968, where it has been stationed ever since. Since reactivation, it has participated in numerous exercises and operations including relief operations following Hurricane Andrew.

The unit was awarded the Joint Award for meritorious achievement while serving with the Task Force Somalia from 5 December 1992 to 4 May 1993.

On 16 October 2001, the 62nd Medical Group was re-designated as 62nd Medical Brigade. Additionally, Headquarters and Headquarters Detachment was re-designated as Headquarters and Headquarters Company.

=== Second Gulf War ===
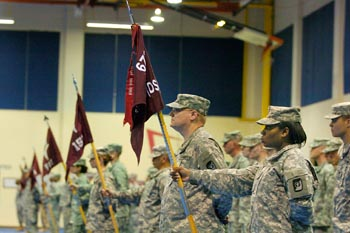
62nd soldiers at parade rest

The Headquarters, 62nd Medical Brigade began initial planning for deployment as the medical brigade for Task Force Ironhorse, 4th Infantry Division from Fort Hood, Texas. The brigade was one element of the task force planned to enter Iraq through Turkey. When the northern option dissolved, the brigade deployed to Kuwait in February 2003, where it received its change of mission from V Corps, 900 km through Kuwait to Mosul, Iraq, the brigade made it quicker and safer than any other Combat Service Support unit in theater. ATask Force Steadfast provided echelon above division combat health support to the 101st Airborne Division (Air Assault). The multi-component task force had representation from the National Guard, Reserves, and active component that provided command and control, hospitalizations, ground and air evacuation, preventive medicine, combat stress, medical logistics, and area medical support. The brigade headquarters redeployed to Fort Lewis in August 2003, with the last brigade's element returned in July 2004.

The 62nd Medical Brigade received orders for a second rotation in support of Operation Iraqi Freedom 04–06 in June 2004. The Headquarters, 62nd Medical Brigade began planning for deployment as the sustainment theater of operations medical command and control. The brigade deployed to Kuwait in December 2004, as the headquarters element of a multi component task force which includes, Army, Air Force, Navy, and Marine elements from the active and reserve component. The task force provided Level III hospitalization, vet services, PM, mental health, combat stress, logistics, ground and air evacuation operations throughout CENTCOM area of responsibility. Level III hospitalization was performed by Expeditionary Medical Facility (EMF) Portsmouth and Dallas (USN), vet services by 993rd and 64th Vet Detachment (USA), preventive medicine services by FDPMU-E (USN), mental health services by COSTAF (USAF), combat stress services by (USN), logistical support by Forward Team, 6th MLMC and the 551st Medical Logistics Company (USA), ground evacuation by the 514th Medical Company (GA) (USA), and air evacuation by the 236th Medical Company (AA) (USA). The 54th Medical Company (AA) provided air evacuation in Iraq.

On 10 July 2007, 62nd Medical Brigade's colors were cased once again for OIF 07–09. 62nd Medical Brigade was tasked with the command and control all medical aspects (Medical, Dental, Preventive Medicine, Veterinarian Services, Combat Stress Control, and Medical Logistics) in support of soldiers, sailors, airmen, marines, contractors and local nationals in the Iraq Theatre of Operations. Present at the Casing of the Colors ceremony was guest Brigadier General Sheila Baxter, Commander of Madigan Army Medical Center and Western Regional Medical Command.

The 62nd Medical Brigade Headquarters served as the command and control (C2) element as Task Force Medical-Afghanistan (TF MED-A) from June through December 2013. Primary responsibilities included the coordination of all medical assets for the Army, Navy, and Air Force at echelons above brigade combat team (EABCT) throughout Afghanistan.

Individual members and elements from throughout the brigade continue to serve with missions around the world.

== See also ==
- AMEDD
- MEDCOM
- Fort Sam Houston
- 1st Medical Brigade
- 44th Medical Brigade
