= 189th Infantry Brigade (United States) =

- Shoulder sleeve insignia
- Active: 24 June 1921 – 8 October 1945; 9 January 1948 – 15 September 1951; 1 March 1952 – 1 April 1959; 24 October 1997 – 16 October 1999; 1 December 2007 – present
- Country: United States
- Branch: Regular Army and Reserve
- Type: Infantry
- Role: Training
- Size: Brigade
- Part of: 85th Support Command
- Garrison/HQ: Joint Base Lewis-McChord, Washington
- Nickname: "Bayonet Brigade"
- Mottos: Swift and Lethal
- Engagements: World War II: Northern France Campaign; Rhineland Campaign; Ardennes-Alsace Campaign; Central Europe Campaign
- Decorations: Army Superior Unit Award

Commanders
- Current commander: COL Lou Kangas; CSM Victor Benavides

Insignia
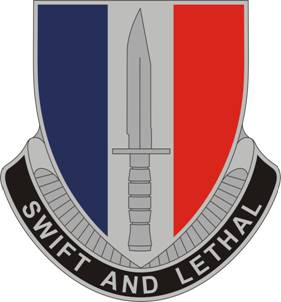
- Distinctive unit insignia

- Designated but not authorized shoulder sleeve insignia

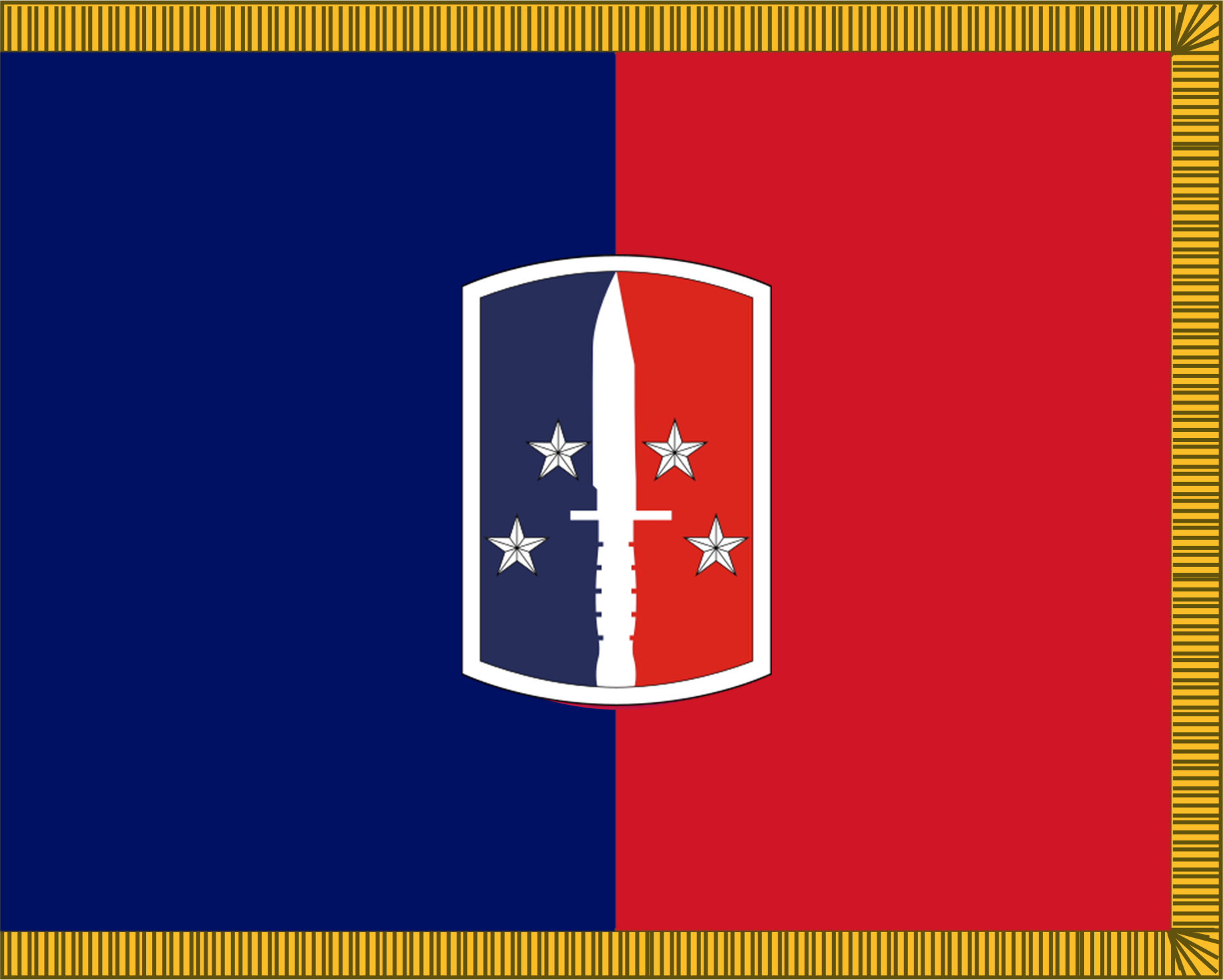
- 189th Infantry Brigade Flag

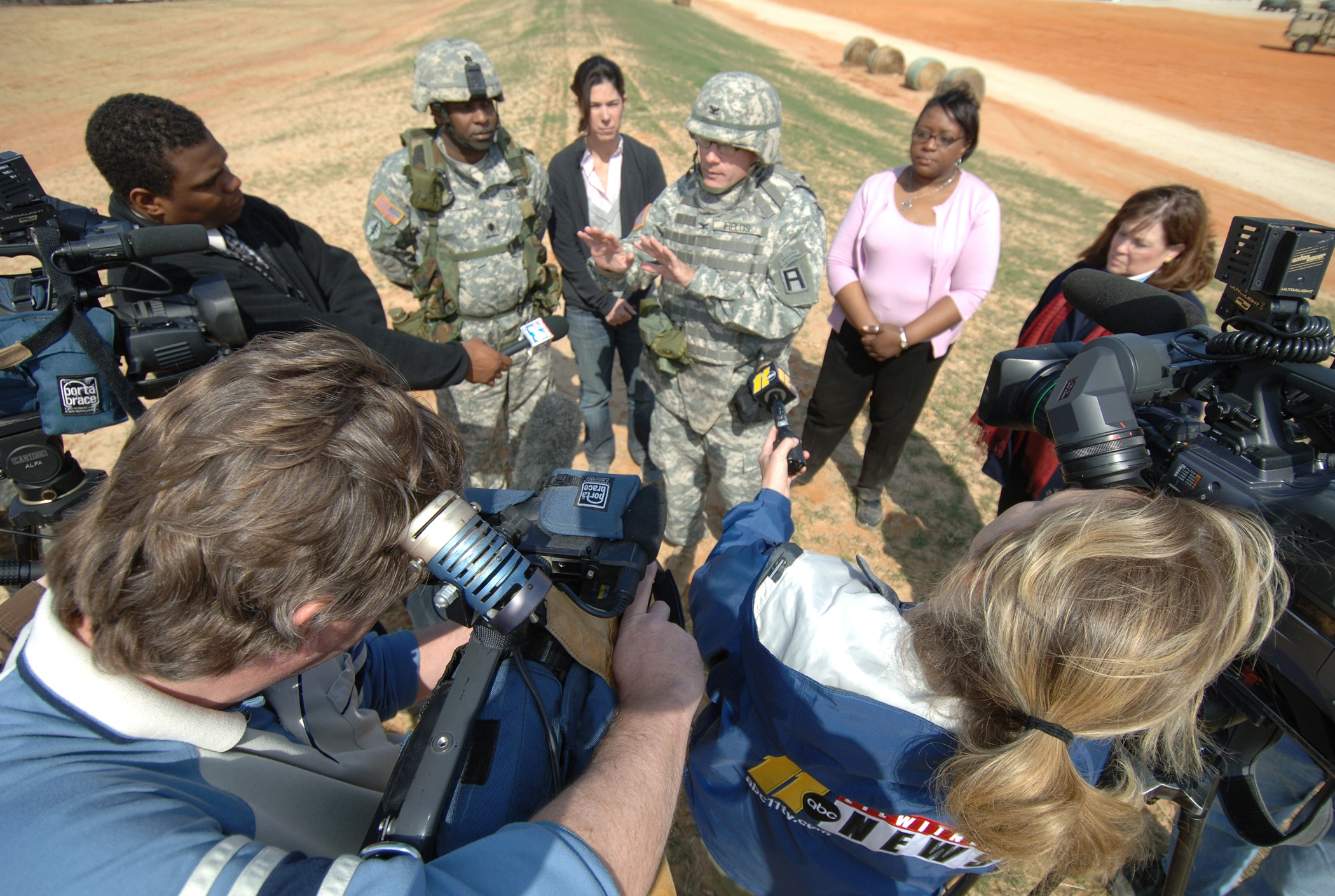
Colonel Mark Fields, former commander of the 189th Infantry Brigade explains training doctrine and other information about provincial reconstruction teams to media.

The 189th Infantry Brigade is an Infantry brigade of the United States Army based at Joint Base Lewis-McChord, Washington. It is a training brigade subordinate to First Army.

Originally organized as a part of the 95th Infantry Division for World War I, the brigade never saw combat in that conflict. Kept active and in the reserve through much of the 20th century, the brigade in name was reorganized into a different unit for fighting during World War II. Seeing numerous moves, activations and deactivations, the brigade has been used principally as a training unit for most of its existence. Reactivated again in 2006, the brigade is now primarily responsible for training provincial reconstruction teams and their supporting elements for deployment to the War in Afghanistan.

== History ==
=== Origins ===
The 189th Infantry Brigade was first constituted and activated on 24 June 1921 in the Organized Reserves, and assigned to the 95th Division. The brigade was organized in 1922 at Muskogee, Oklahoma. It would stay active as a reserve brigade for the interwar period, but it would not be utilized for any pertinent missions.

On 23 March 1925 the formation was reorganized as the 189th Brigade. On 24 August 1936 the formation was reorganized again as the 189th Infantry Brigade. In 1940, the brigade's headquarters was changed to McAlester, Oklahoma.

=== World War II ===
The formation saw great changes in preparation for mobilization to fight during World War II. On 13 February 1942 the brigade structure was downsized greatly and converted into a reconnaissance element. It was combined with assets from the 190th Infantry Brigade to form the 95th Reconnaissance Troop which was subsequently assigned to the 95th Division once again. The troop was ordered into active military service on 15 July 1942 and reorganized at Camp Swift, Texas, as the 95th Cavalry Reconnaissance Troop, an element of the 95th Division. The division itself was also in the process of being reorganized into the 95th Infantry Division.

On 1 August 1943, the group was reorganized, given vehicles, and redesignated as the 95th Reconnaissance Troop, Mechanized. It was then deployed with the 95th Infantry Division to England on 17 August 1944 was subsequently deployed to northern France. The troop fought with the Division through northern France, and eventually northern Germany capturing town after town until the end of the war. The formation received four campaign streamers for its participation, the only four it was to earn.

After the end of World War II, the troop returned home and began the process of demobilization. It inactivated on 8 October 1945 at Camp Shelby, Mississippi.

On 26 December 1947, the inactive formation was redesignated as the 95th Mechanized Cavalry Reconnaissance Troop. It was then activated on 9 January 1948 at Oklahoma City, Oklahoma. On 17 December 1948, the brigade headquarters was moved to Stillwater, Oklahoma. On 30 June 1949, the troop was again reorganized as the 95th Reconnaissance Company. This allowed it to take on a larger structure and control more personnel. The formation was inactivated on 15 September 1951 at Stillwater, Oklahoma.

It was again activated 1 March 1952 at Jonesboro, Arkansas. The company had its location changed to Wewoka, Oklahoma on 1 June 1955. The company would be inactivated for their last time four years later on 1 April 1959 when it was disbanded in Wewoka.

The 95th Reconnaissance Company would never see action again. Its elements would return to their designations before World War II. On 21 January 1963, the main elements of the company were reconstituted as the 189th Infantry Brigade. It was then allotted to the Active duty force. Though inactive, if the brigade was ever activated again it would be formed as a part of the active duty force as a separate brigade. The 190th Infantry Brigade would not be reactivated, either. Its assets would be designated as 3rd Brigade, 24th Infantry Division, having never been reorganized after its redesignation in 1942.

On 24 October 1997, the brigade was activated at Fort Bragg as a training brigade. With a population of nearly 50,000 soldiers and numerous other tenant units, the fort had a large contingent of soldiers necessitating multiple brigades for training. However, after two years of service on the Fort, it was inactivated on 16 October 1999 at the base. The elements of the brigade were subsequently merged with the 4th Brigade, 78th Division (Training Support), another training brigade on base responsible for exercises.

=== Reactivation ===
The 189th Infantry Brigade was activated once again on 1 December 2006 at Fort Bragg. This was done by reflagging the 4th Brigade, 78th Division back to the 189th Infantry Brigade. The reflagging was just one part of the overall streamlining of the First Army from five training support Divisions commanding 16 divisional brigades to two larger regions commanding 16 separate brigades. The process was also designed to make identification of the brigades easier. It was assigned to Division East of the First Army. Division East contains eight training brigades with responsibilities for the entire region east of the Mississippi River.

The brigade was organized as a training brigade preparing Army Reserve and Army National Guard units for deployment. The brigade prepares other units for mobilization and provides training, assistance, and support to them during pre-deployment exercises, and evaluates performance and progress of these units as they are deploying. Since its reactivation, the brigade has specialized in training provincial reconstruction teams (PRTs) deploying to Afghanistan. In early 2007, the 189th Infantry Brigade, along with the 158th Infantry Brigade, cooperated to train the first 12 PRTs at once at Fort Bragg for three-month training exercises. PRT personnel were trained in a wide range of scenarios, ranging from hospital repairs to childbirth scenarios and language labs. Afterwards, they conducted a conference on the training, in which it was decided that cultural awareness and language training needed to be stressed for future PRTs. It was during this training that the brigade finally received its distinctive unit insignia and shoulder sleeve insignia on 25 May 2008. In early 2008, the Brigade began training another group of 12 PRTs. Several months later, the Brigades began training the next 12 PRTs for a 270-day deployment to Afghanistan.

In 2011, the 189th Infantry Brigade transferred from the authority of Division East, First Army, to Division West, First Army, and uncased its colors at Joint Base Lewis-McChord on 7 September.

The brigade has worked closely with the Civilian Response Corps to standardize and institutionalize the training for the PRTs. All members of the PRTs are required to assemble for the training, which lasts approximately six weeks. These PRTs include members of the Army, Navy, Air Force, and civilian military contractors, as well as members of the UN Assistance Mission Agency (sic: United Nations Assistance Mission in Afghanistan?), and numerous other groups. It has also been responsible for training security forces that guard the PRTs, including elements of the 33rd Infantry Brigade Combat Team.

== Organization ==
The 189th Infantry Brigade is a Combined Arms Training Brigade (CATB) assigned to the 85th Support Command. Like all formations of the 85th Support Command, the brigade is not a combat formation, but instead trains Army Reserve and Army National Guard units preparing for deployment. As of January 2026, the brigade consists of a Headquarters and Headquarters Company, five active duty battalions, and five reserve battalions.

- 189th Infantry Brigade, at Joint Base Lewis–McChord (WA)
  - Headquarters and Headquarters Company, at Joint Base Lewis–McChord (WA)
  - 1st Battalion, 356th Regiment (Logistical Support), at Joint Base Lewis–McChord (WA)
  - 1st Battalion, 357th Regiment (Brigade Support Battalion), at Joint Base Lewis–McChord (WA)
  - 2nd Battalion, 357th Regiment (Infantry), at Joint Base Lewis–McChord (WA)
  - 2nd Battalion, 358th Regiment (Armor), at Joint Base Lewis–McChord (WA)
  - 3rd Battalion, 358th Regiment (Field Artillery), at Joint Base Lewis–McChord (WA)
  - 3rd Battalion, 360th Regiment (Training Support), in Salt Lake City (UT)
  - 3rd Battalion, 363rd Regiment (Training Support), at Joint Forces Training Base – Los Alamitos (CA)
  - 1st Battalion, 364th Regiment (Training Support), at Joint Base Lewis–McChord (WA)
  - 2nd Battalion, 364th Regiment (Training Support), at Joint Base Lewis–McChord (WA)
  - 3rd Battalion, 364th Regiment (Brigade Engineer Battalion), at Joint Base Lewis–McChord (WA)

The brigade's four training support battalions and logistical support battalion are Army Reserve formations.

== Honors ==
=== Unit decorations ===
Ribbon	Award	Year	Orders
	Army Superior Unit Award	2008-2011	Permanent Orders 332-07 announcing award of the Army Superior Unit award

=== Campaign streamers ===
Conflict	Streamer	Year(s)
World War II	Northern France	1944
World War II	Rhineland	1945
World War II	Ardennes-Alsace Campaign	1944–1945
World War II	Central Europe	1945
