= 404th Army Field Support Brigade =

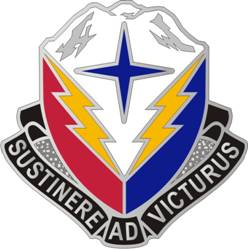
- Active: 16 October 2008 - present
- Country: United States
- Branch: Army
- Type: Support
- Size: Brigade
- Garrison/HQ: Joint Base Lewis-McChord, Washington
- Motto: Sustinere ad Victurnus (Sustain To Win)
- Website: https://www.aschq.army.mil/Units/404th/

Commanders
- Current commander: COL Jeremiah S. O'Connor
- Command Sergeant Major: CSM Brian L. Creed

Insignia
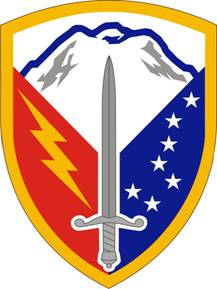
- Former SSI 2008-2010

- Current SSI United States Army Materiel Command

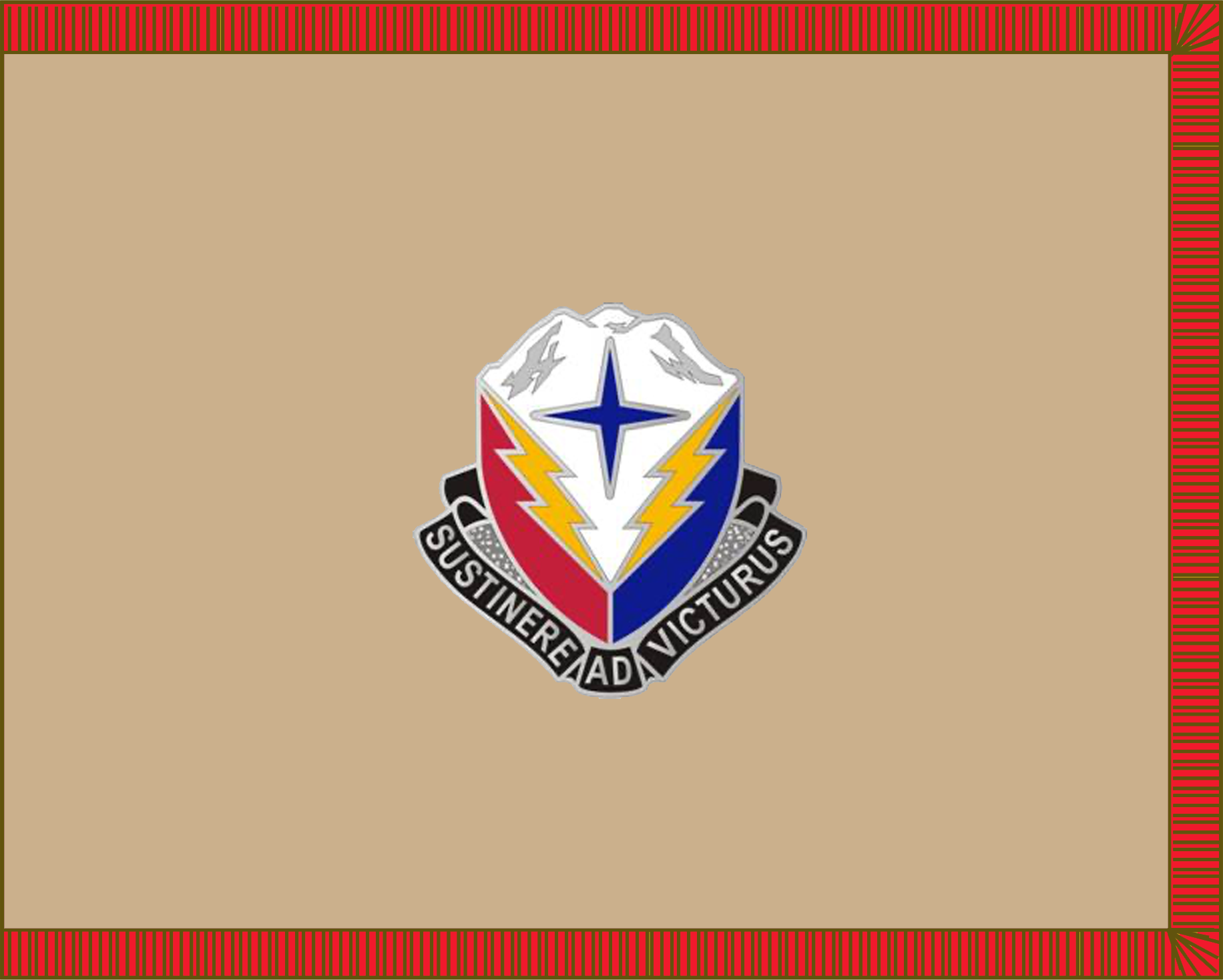
- 404th Army Field Support Brigade Flag

The 404th Army Field Support Brigade (AFSB) of the United States Army is a subordinate unit of the Army Materiel Command (AMC) that provides installation logistics, maintains prepositioned material, and supports capabilities to increase soldier and material readiness - both on land and via sealift.

The Brigade was activated October 16, 2008. The Brigade commands two Army Field Support Battalions, two Logistics Support Teams, and 17 Logistics Readiness Centers. As of 2022, the brigade was focused on the Army's new DSLE (division logistics support element) concept for division sized elements.

In 2024, the brigade was supporting the Army's Rapid Removal of Excess (R2E) program disposing of old, outdated equipment and redistributing equipment still in useful condition to other Army units.

== Organization ==
- 404th Army Field Support Brigade, at Joint Base Lewis–McChord (WA)
  - Army Field Support Battalion-Charleston, at Joint Base Charleston (SC)
  - Army Field Support Battalion-Lewis, at Joint Base Lewis–McChord (WA)

== Insignia ==
The Distinctive Unit Insignia is a silver metal pin in the shape of a shield with a white mountain at the top. A blue four pointed star is on the mountain and the bottom of the shield is divided red and blue with gold lightning bolts on the inside. Below all is a black ribbon with the motto "Sustinere Ad Victurus" (Sustain To Win). The insignia was approved 16 October 2008.

== Former Commanders ==
From	To	Commander
2006	2008	COL Steven Risley
2008	2009	COL Brian R. Haebig
2009	2011	COL George G. Akin
2011	2013	COL Leafaina O. Yahn
2013	2015	COL James S. Moore
2015	2017	COL Sydney A. Smith
2017	2019	COL Peter J. Crandall
2019	2021	COL Michael E. Rivera
2021	2023	COL John C. Rotante
2023		COL Jeremiah O'Connor
