= Northwest Joint Regional Correctional Facility =

Military prison at Fort Lewis, Washington

Coordinates: 47.0872681°N 122.6336516°W

Northwestern Joint Regional Correctional Facility (NWJRCF) was a Level II correctional activity with facility operations in Fort Lewis, Washington and Submarine Base Bangor, Washington.

NWJRCF reports directly to the United States Army Corrections Command in Fort Leavenworth, Kansas.

== Mission statement ==
The Northwestern Joint Regional Correctional Facility provides custody/control, education and vocational opportunities as well as behavioral mental health programs of prisoners in an effort to assist their transition back into the civilian community or return to duty. On order, prepare individual soldiers to deploy and conduct full-spectrum operations.

== Organization structure ==
The NWJRCF consists of primarily of Army Soldiers assigned to the 508th Military Police Battalion, Army Corrections Brigade. These Soldiers are joined by several members of the Navy assigned to the sub base in Bangor who serve as the liaisons for their respective service personnel incarcerated within the facility and also assist in the daily operations of the facility. The staff is rounded out Navy Department and Army civilians.

== History ==
The Fort Lewis Regional Corrections Facility (RCF) was activated in March 1957 as an Installation Detention Facility (IDF) to specifically satisfy the post's short term confinement and those transfers to the United States Corrections Brigade at Fort Riley, Kansas or the United States Disciplinary Barracks at Fort Leavenworth, KS. During the Vietnam War the facility was managed by personnel from the 18th Military Police Company (Escort Guard), 392d MP Bn, 2 MP Gp. The Company personnel were supplemented by soldiers from units assigned to Ft. Lewis which raised the company headcount to upwards of 270 guard personnel. Not until the commencement of the Vietnam War did the IDF population began to regularly exceed 50 Army prisoners although many times prior it was well over that amount. The IDF was officially established as a Regional Corrections Facility on 20 June 1984. As the number of Desert Storm unit deployments increased, the Acting Commander, I Corps & Fort Lewis approved the activation of a Provisional Battalion Headquarters to assume command of rear detachment units. When officially activated on 30 November 1990, the Garrison Troop Support Battalion (GTSB) assumed command of 15 rear detachment commands. The IDF commander was designated the commander of the GTSB.

On 1 May 1991, the IDF was reorganized as a Regional Corrections Facility to support Army commands and activities in the Western United States, Alaska, Hawaii, and Korea. The facility operated a wide variety of correctional and employment programs to support prisoners from all military departments within the Department of Defense. In October 1992, the GTSB was inactivated and the battalion was redesignated as the Law Enforcement Battalion consisting of the Correctional Holding Detachment, B Company (garrison law enforcement) and C Company (corrections). On 30 March 1993, Department of the Army redesignated the Law Enforcement Battalion as the 704th Military Police Battalion. The battalion was activated, reorganized, and redesignated as the 508th Military Police Battalion (Internment/Resettlement) 16 October 2005 at Fort Lewis, Washington, and deployed in December to serve in Operation Iraqi Freedom.

The 508th Military Police Battalion (I/R) was constituted on 29 July 1921 in the Organized Reserves as the 308th Military Police Battalion. The battalion was withdrawn from the Organized Reserves on 1 January 1938 and allotted to the Regular Army. The battalion was redesignated on 1 June 1940 as the 508th Military Police Battalion. The battalion was activated on 20 March 1944 at Fort Sam Houston, Texas, and arrived in the European Theater in December 1944. It initially served in England where in January 1945, it was transferred to the newly formed 15th Army. In mid-March, the 508th was moved to France and attached to 1st Army. The battalion participated in the final drive of the allied armies into Germany performing traffic control, operation of straggler control points, and suppression of violence between Russian and Polish displaced persons and German Civilians in and around the area of Dueren, Germany. The battalion was reorganized and redesignated 20 October 1947 as the 508th Military Police Service Battalion. During 1945–51 the battalion and its subordinate companies were located in the Stetten Kaserne, Dachau Strasse, responsible for law and order operations in the locale and on the Munich and Garmisch Military Posts. The battalion was inactivated 1 July 1964 in Germany, and reactivated 25 August 1967 at Fort Riley, Kansas. Companies A, B, C, and D were inactivated 1 November 1970, followed by the Headquarters and Headquarters Detachment on 29 March 1973.

In October 2008, the Regional Corrections facility was realigned under the Army Corrections Command. On 30 April 2009, the memorandum of agreement between all services as directed by BRAC 2005, established the partnership with the Consolidated Naval Brig Miramar Detachment Puget Sound, as the Northwestern Joint Regional Correctional Facility.

In the second half of 2019, it was announced that the NWJRCF would be demolished for the construction of a new facility to be built on the same site. A ceremony to commemorate the closure of the (old) NWJRCF and celebrate the groundbreaking for the (new) NWJRCF facility was held on 3 March 2020.

In February 2025, Upon their arrival, the 508th MP BN (D) established what is now known as Task Force Guardian. Their joint team, composed of U.S. Army, U.S. Navy and U.S. Marines personnel with a variety of specialties, is responsible for providing internal and external security while illegal aliens await their safe and humane return to their home countries.

“Many of our personnel have never operated in a joint environment, but task force leadership built a cohesive team quickly and we felt welcomed from day one,” said U.S. Army Lt. Col. Travis Nicholson, 508th MP BN (D) commander and former Task Force Guardian commander. “Specifically, as a multi-component Army element within the Joint Task Force, our voices were heard and helped quickly shape operations to ensure illegal aliens are safe, secure and humanely treated.”

== Notable former inmates ==
- Robert Bales (born 1973), perpetrator of the Kandahar massacre
- Johnny M. Horne Jr. (born 1971), murdered a teenaged Iraqi girl
