= Robert Bales =

American mass murderer

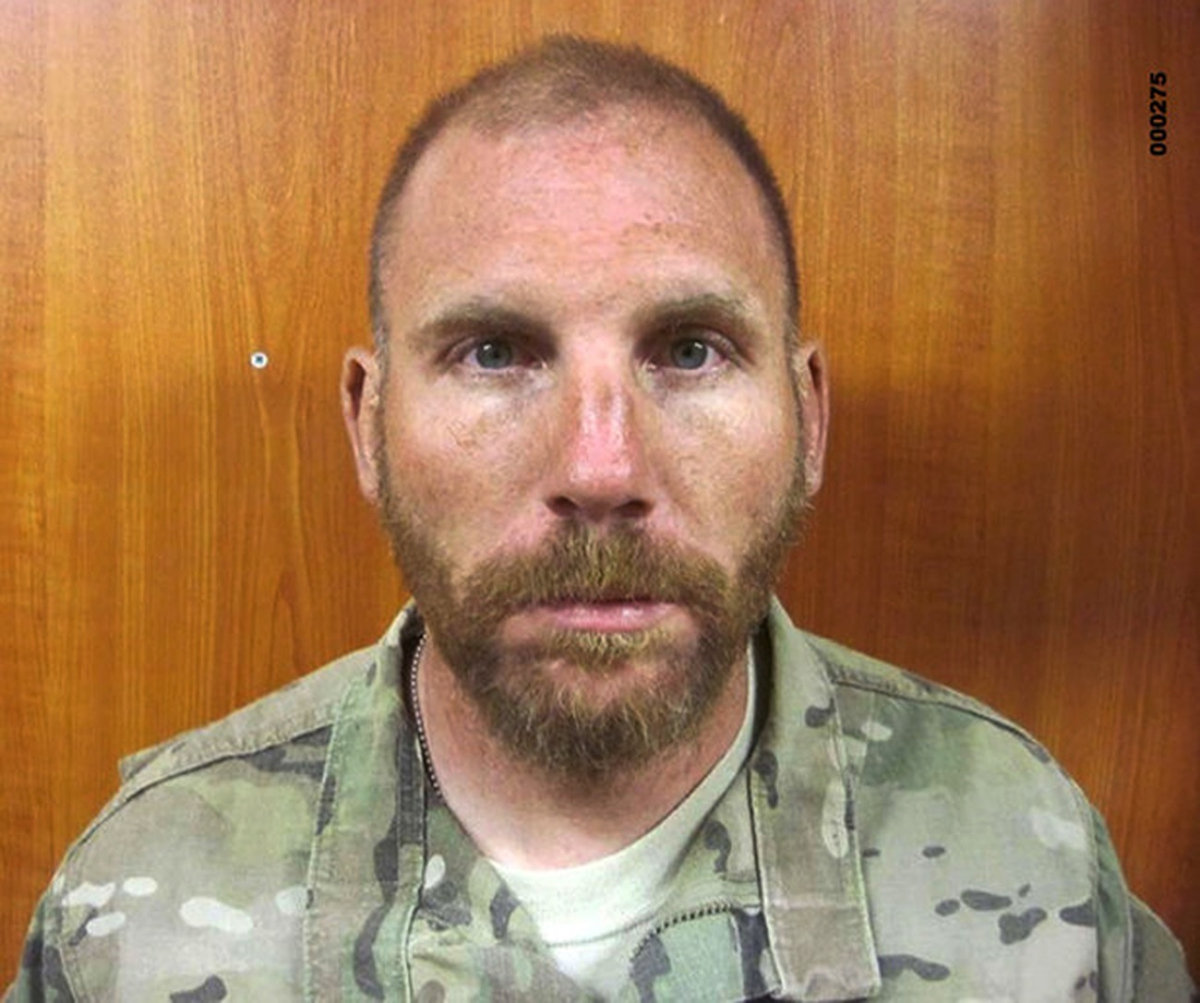
- Bales in March 2012
- Born: June 30, 1973 (age 53); Norwood, Ohio, U.S.
- Education: Ohio State University
- Occupation: Former U.S. Army soldier
- Known for: Kandahar massacre
- Spouse: Karilyn Bales
- Children: 2
- Status: Incarcerated
- Convictions: Premeditated murder (16 counts); Attempted premeditated murder (6 counts); Assault with a dangerous weapon (7 counts)
- Penalty: Life imprisonment Dishonorable Discharge

Details
- Date: March 11, 2012; 03:00 AFT
- Locations: Balandi and Alkozai villages of Afghanistan
- Target: Afghan civilians
- Killed: 16
- Injured: 6
- Weapons: M4 carbine and M9 sidearm; some victims were found with both gunshot and stab wounds.
- Imprisoned at: United States Disciplinary Barracks

Robert Bales (born June 30, 1973) is an American mass murderer, convicted war criminal, and former U.S. Army sniper who murdered 16 Afghan civilians in a mass shooting in Panjwayi District, Kandahar Province, Afghanistan, on March 11, 2012 – an event known as the Kandahar massacre.

In order to avoid a possible death sentence, Bales pleaded guilty to 16 counts of murder, six counts of attempted murder, and seven counts of assault in a plea deal. On August 23, 2013, he was sentenced to life in prison without parole. Before sentencing, Bales expressed his regret by referring to the murders as "an act of cowardice". While Bales has exhausted all military appeals, his attorney announced in 2019 that he would be seeking a new trial in civilian court due to possible side effects of mefloquine, an anti-malaria drug that Bales claims to have been taking at the time of the shooting.

== Early life and education ==
Bales was born on June 30, 1973, and raised in Norwood, Ohio, near Cincinnati, the youngest of five brothers. He attended Norwood High School where he played football and was named class president. After high school Bales briefly enrolled at College of Mount St. Joseph, then transferred to Ohio State University, where he studied economics for three years, but left without graduating in 1996.

After leaving college, Bales worked as a stockbroker at five financial services firms in Columbus, Ohio. The firms were related, sharing employees and corporate offices. During that period, while employed with Michael Patterson, Inc., Bales and the firm engaged in fraudulent securities activities. In 2003, an arbitration panel found both Bales and his employer liable for financial fraud related to the handling of a retirement account and ordered them to pay $1.2 million in civil damages. Gary Liebschner, the victim, said he "never got paid a penny" of the award. According to Liebschner's lawyer, they had not pursued legal action against Bales to collect the judgment because they were unable to locate Bales, who had joined the U.S. Army at age 28, just 18 months after the long-running arbitration case was filed.

In May 1999, while still employed with a securities firm in Ohio, Bales, his brother Mark, and Marc Edwards co-founded a financial services firm named Spartina Investments in Doral, Florida. The state dissolved Spartina in September 2000, after the company failed to file its annual report in a timely manner.

Bales' brother-in-law stated that Bales joined the Army after the September 11 attacks because he "felt it was something he should do because he felt he had to make something right" and that joining the Army was his way of vindicating himself.

In 2002, Bales was charged with assaulting his then-girlfriend and ordered to undergo anger-management counseling.

In 2003, Bales met his later wife-to-be Kari Primeau while she was at a bar supporting her friend's band. Kari states that Bales was a man "full of enthusiasm, eager to tell her every little thing he was learning about war and how to wage it," until he deployed to Iraq. Their relationship grew serious while he was overseas.

In 2008, Bales was briefly detained after fleeing a hit and run.

== Career ==
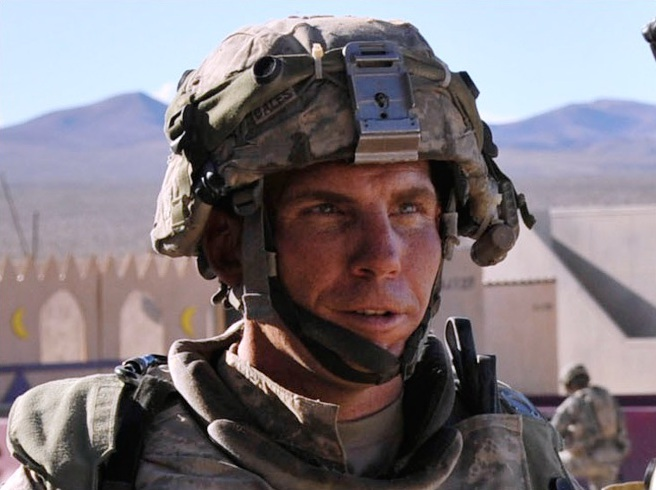
Bales at the Fort Irwin National Training Center in August 2011

Bales enlisted in the U.S. Army in November 2001, shortly after the September 11 attacks. He was initially assigned to the 2nd Battalion, 3rd Infantry of the 3rd Stryker Brigade, 2nd Infantry Division in Fort Lewis. He completed three tours in the Iraq War: twelve months in 2003 and 2004, fifteen months in 2006 and 2007, and ten months in 2009 and 2010. During the 2007 tour, he reportedly injured his foot in the Battle of Najaf, and during the 2010 tour, he was treated for traumatic brain injury after his vehicle was rolled in an accident.

According to public records, Bales had been involved in several incidents while stationed at Fort Lewis which had resulted in the police responding. In 2002, he got into a fight with a security guard at a Tacoma area casino and was charged with misdemeanor criminal assault, but the charge was dismissed after he paid a small fine and attended anger management classes. Another confrontation outside of a bar in 2008 was also reported to police, but no charges were filed.

Bales was promoted to staff sergeant (SSG) on April 1, 2008, which made him responsible for nineteen men, whom he believed were insufficiently prepared. It was also at this time that he became increasingly critical about Special Forces superiors, claiming that they were too passive towards the enemy, accompanied by a hostile attitude and a belief that he was not being granted the respect that he believed he had earned. While in Iraq, Bales was injured twice and sustained 10 IED blasts. In 2010, it is speculated, he may have sustained a traumatic brain injury when his humvee flipped over. He received orders of deployment to Afghanistan in December 2011, which were speculated to have caused marital conflict and financial strain because his family was not expecting him to be deployed again. On February 1, 2012, he was assigned to Camp Belambai in the Kandahar Province, Afghanistan, where he was responsible for providing base security for U.S. Army Special Forces and U.S. Navy SEALs who were engaged in village stability operations.

=== Kandahar massacre ===
On March 10, Bales was posted to guard duty with a private in his unit, with whom he discussed a promotion that he wanted and thought he deserved, since he had already been passed over for the promotion once before. While on watch, Bales saw lights flashing on and off in the nearby villages of Naja Bien and Alikozai, and concluded that Taliban insurgents were communicating with light signals. When he was relieved of guard duty at 9:00 pm, he claims that he alerted the new guard team of this and that they did not take him seriously, but the Army denies that the conversation ever took place. He then joined SSG David Godwin and Sergeant (SGT) Jason McLaughlin to drink whiskey mixed with diet soda from a plastic water bottle, although drinking alcohol was prohibited on base. Bales says he had had six or seven drinks over the next couple of hours while watching the movie Man on Fire – a revenge action film about an ex-military bodyguard who goes on a murderous rampage after the girl he has been hired to protect is kidnapped and presumed dead. According to the Army's investigation, as Bales became increasingly intoxicated, he once again discussed his prospective promotion to Sergeant First Class, the anger he felt about his comrades being seriously injured by insurgent attacks, his complaints about the leadership of the Green Berets, his marriage, and his financial troubles. Around midnight, Bales consumed a handful of over-the-counter sleeping pills, stating that he had not slept in days and wanted to rest. The pills did not move him to sleep, so he took his concerns to Green Beret SGT Clayton Blackshear, emphasizing that he felt he and his men were not doing enough to stop Taliban insurgents from operating freely in the area and targeting US soldiers. Bales also requested to take Blackshear's place and run point when the men were patrolling on foot—a job that Bales had done while in Iraq. Per Blackshear's testimony in the Army's investigation, Bales said that he did not care if he died in the line of duty, because his life did not matter as much as the lives of Blackshear and younger soldiers. Blackshear informed Bales that the Green Berets were short-staffed and could not take decisive action until their forces were replenished. Bales then went back to his room and lay awake.

In the early morning hours of March 11, 2012, Bales killed 16 Afghan civilians (nine children, some as young as two years old, four women and three men) in the villages of Balandi and Alkozai in the Panjwayi District of Kandahar Province near Camp Belambai. According to official reports, Bales left combat outpost Camp Belamby at 3:00 am local time wearing night vision goggles. Bales was wearing traditional Afghan clothing over his ACU. Government officials with knowledge of the investigation state that the killings were carried out in two phases, with Bales returning to base in between. An Afghan guard reported a soldier returning to base at 1:30 am, and another guard reported a soldier leaving at 2:30 am. Bales is believed to have first gone to Alkozai, about 1/2 mile (0.80 km) north of Camp Belambay, then to Najiban (called Balandi in earlier reports), located 1 1/2 miles (2.4 km) south of the base. Four people were killed and six wounded in Alkozai, and twelve people were killed in Najiban. U.S. sentries at the base heard gunshots in Alkozai, but did not take action besides attempting to view Alkozai from their post inside the base. Until March 22, U.S. authorities recognized 16 people killed, including nine children, four men, and three women. On March 22 that number was revised to 17, but later reduced back to 16. It was initially reported that five others were injured, and that number was eventually increased to six.

When Bales returned to the base to resupply his ammunition, he states that he told one of the sergeants that he was drinking with earlier that night that he had "just killed some military-aged males in Alikozai, that he was going to go to Naja Bien to finish it", and that he wanted the Sergeant to "take care of his wife and kids." The sergeant was reportedly irritated, half asleep, and did not believe him, only relenting to "take care of Bales' kids" so that he would leave him to go back to sleep. Bales claims that he expected not to come back to the base. He left for the second time after resupplying his ammo, adding grenades and a grenade launcher to his resources.

Bales stated in an interview that he went to the homes of suspected insurgents, where insurgent satellite phones, bombs, and rifles had been found. In the same interview, Bales states that he did not find any of the enemy cache that he had been looking for. He also reported being disoriented when he left the last villagers' home, realizing that he was now cold, wearing only a T-shirt and army pants.

According to the Army, Bales burned some of the victims' bodies, an act considered desecration under Islamic law. Bales claims that he did not do this, stating that it must have been a lantern that was knocked over. Witnesses said that the eleven corpses from one family were shot in the head, stabbed, then gathered into one room and set on fire. A pile of ashes was found on the floor of one victims' house; at least one child's body was found partially charred. A reporter for The New York Times inspected the children's bodies taken to a nearby American military base and reported seeing burns on some of the legs and heads.

When Bales exited the last house in Naja Bien, the commanding officer of the Green Berets, CPT Daniel Fields, ordered a rescue team to begin scouring the area around the base for SSG Bales, also dispatching the Persistent Ground Surveillance System, a high tech air balloon with a thermal camera attached to it. At 4:30 am, the camera picked up SSG Bales' signal, walking back to the base. At 4:47 am, Bales approached the base, weapons of his fellow Americans pointed at him. He was then disarmed and turned over to the Green Berets.

According to the Army, Bales went back and forth for the next eight hours between confessing and obstructing the investigation. Afghans from the surrounding villages had loaded the bodies of the victims onto trucks and were bringing them to the base.

On March 24, U.S. Army investigators said Bales was the sole person responsible for the shootings, which were the result of two separate attacks. Investigators said Bales returned to Camp Belambai after the first attack and left the camp an hour later to commit the second. It was reported that when he finally returned to the camp and surrendered his weapon, it was wrapped in an Afghan shawl. After being arrested, Bales sought out attorney John Henry Browne, well known in Washington state for reducing his clients' potentially hefty prison sentences and representing serial killer Ted Bundy in court.

Immediately after the massacre, the US Army Criminal Investigation Division went to the scene to attempt to investigate but came under enemy fire; one Afghan soldier was killed in the interaction. When the soldiers finally gained access to the crime scene, families had already removed the bodies and buried them. No photos of the bodies were taken, and DNA evidence was scraped off of the walls of Afghan homes for forensic evidence. A page and a half report was written and officially submitted. The lack of forensic evidence prohibited the confirmation of the accuracy of Afghan allegations against Bales. The DNA evidence gathered from the walls of Afghan homes and from the family members of the deceased was never cross referenced against the US database to verify if any of the three adult males among the sixteen victims were enemy combatants.

A senior military official said Bales had been drinking alcohol with two other soldiers on the night of the shootings, in violation of military rules in combat zones. According to Defense Secretary Leon Panetta, Bales acknowledged the killings and "told individuals what happened" immediately after being captured. Minutes later, he refused to speak with investigators and asked for an attorney. Browne later said, "I don't know that the government is going to prove much. There's no forensic evidence. There's no confession." Browne met with Bales on March 19 and claims that his client remembers "very little" of the event. At the time of November 5, 2012, Browne refused to give any concrete information on this topic for fear of the Army kicking him off the case for "disclosing still classified information." However, in May 2013, Browne said his client would confess to the massacre in return for avoiding the death penalty.

An interview about the investigation with an Army intelligence officer stated that crime scene evidence, specifically that of shot patterns, was being looked at to determine the true nature of the crime. The officer stated that, as a sniper, "Bales is trained to wait for his shot and quietly blend back into his surroundings. But, allegedly, he went contrary to his strongest skillset. He burst into the open, fired up close, and stayed at the scene." The officer deemed this "incomprehensible behavior" and stated that the investigation was ruling out nothing as possible influences in Bales' motivation.

In alternative theories to the massacre, villagers said that the crime was committed by more than one soldier. A woman by the name of Bibi Massoma claims that two Americans entered the room - one shot her husband while the other shot her six-month-old baby. Villagers in the area are also confused as to how a lone sniper was responsible for the killings in both the Balandi and Alkozai villages, since they were a 30-minute walk apart, in addition to having to sneak off base, past Special Forces troops, patrols and military surveillance measures.

=== Detention ===
After his arrest, Bales was transferred out of Afghanistan, stopping at a U.S. military base in Kuwait. His stop in Kuwait upset the Kuwaiti government, as they had heard about the Bales case from news reports before being informed by the U.S. government. According to an unnamed official: "When they learned about it, the Kuwaitis blew a gasket and wanted him out of there."

On March 16, 2012, Bales was flown from Kuwait to the Midwest Joint Regional Correctional Facility in Fort Leavenworth, Kansas. According to U.S. Army Colonel James Hutton, Chief of Media Relations, Bales was being held in special housing in his own cell, and was able to go outside the cell "for hygiene and recreational purposes".

On March 19, 2012, Bales met with Browne at Fort Leavenworth, Kansas, prison.

On March 23, 2012, the U.S. government charged Bales with seventeen counts of murder, six counts of attempted murder, and six counts of assault.

On June 1, 2012, the government dropped one of the murder charges, because one victim had been double counted. Simultaneously, other charges were filed, including abuse of steroids, alcohol consumption, and attempting to destroy evidence. Assault charges were increased from six to seven.

In October 2012, Bales was transferred to Northwest Joint Regional Correctional Facility at Joint Base Lewis-McChord.

=== Legal proceedings ===
Browne defended Bales with assigned military lawyers. Browne described Bales as "mild-mannered", claiming his client was upset after seeing a friend's leg blown off the day before the killings, but held no animosity toward Muslims. "I think the message for the public in general is that he's one of our boys and they need to treat him fairly." Browne denied the deadly rampage was caused by alcohol intoxication or marital problems and said Bales was "reluctant to serve." According to Browne, Bales did not want to return to the front lines. Browne said, "He wasn't thrilled about going on another deployment ... he was told he wasn't going back, and then he was told he was going." Browne also criticized anonymous reports from government officials, stating "the government is going to want to blame this on an individual rather than blame it on the war."

Bales had no documented history of mental disorders, and had undergone an extensive mental health screening to become a sniper in 2008. In 2010, he suffered a concussion in a Humvee accident, underwent traumatic brain injury treatment at Fort Lewis, and was deemed healthy. Although Bales was never diagnosed with a mental disorder, Fort Lewis-McChord has had a history of psychiatric misdiagnosis and may have sent soldiers with PTSD back into combat. Investigators examining his medical history described his ten-year U.S. Army tenure as "unremarkable" and found no evidence of serious traumatic brain injury or post-traumatic stress. A high-ranking U.S. official told The New York Times, "When it all comes out, it will be a combination of stress, alcohol and domestic issues—he just snapped." However, Bales had been taking an anti-malaria medication (mefloquine) now known to cause a wide range of side effects, to include aggression, paranoia, psychosis, hallucinations, and suicidal thinking. The Army, as well as the prosecution, deny providing the drug to Bales, although a fellow soldier testified that he had witnessed the distribution. It was also found that Bales had started taking stanozolol three weeks before the massacre.

Then-Secretary of Defense Leon Panetta announced that the United States would seek the death penalty, and President Barack Obama instructed the military to "prosecute" the case aggressively.

As part of the legal proceedings, an Article 32 hearing was held November 5–13, 2012, at Joint Base Lewis-McChord. The hearing included the testimony of eyewitnesses from Afghanistan via a live video link; Bales did not testify.

On May 29, 2013, it was announced Bales would plead guilty (thereby avoiding a possible death sentence) and describe the events of March 11, 2012. On June 5, Bales pleaded guilty in a plea deal to 16 counts of murder and six counts of assault and attempted murder. When asked by Judge Col. Jeffery Nance "What was your reason for killing them?", he said he had asked himself that question "a million times" and added, "There's not a good reason in this world for why I did the horrible things I did." He maintained he did not recall setting bodies on fire, but admitted the evidence was clear that he had. He said he had taken the steroids solely to be "huge and jacked" and blamed them for "definitely" increasing his irritability and anger.

At the sentencing hearing, defense attorneys argued for a sentence of life with the possibility of parole, arguing that he was a troubled man who snapped, not a "cold-blooded murderer". Bales took to the stand to issue an apology to his victims. Lt. Col Jay Morse, a member of the US Army Trial Counsel Assistance Program, was the lead prosecutor in the Bales case. The prosecution, seeking life without the possibility of parole, closed their arguments with: "In just a few short hours, Sgt. Bales wiped out generations. Sgt. Bales dares to ask you for mercy when he has shown none."

On August 23, 2013, a six-person panel sentenced Bales to life in prison without parole. He was also demoted to the lowest enlisted rank, dishonorably discharged, and forfeited all pay and allowances. A commanding general overseeing the court-martial has the option of reducing the sentence to life with the possibility of parole. Afghan villagers and the families of Bales' victims were upset by the decision, saying he deserved death. Bales is incarcerated in the maximum security section of the United States Disciplinary Barracks at Fort Leavenworth. In September 2017, the U.S. Army Criminal Appeals Court upheld Bales' conviction and sentencing. The three-judge panel called the allegation of the use of mefloquine by the defense "speculative." The US Supreme Court later refused to hear Bales' appeal. In December 2020, the defense of Bales requested a pardon from President Donald Trump. Trump did not pardon Bales in his first term.

=== Content ===
During several months of interviews while incarcerated, Bales revealed in depth his recollection of his actions the night of the murders, and why he believed he acted the way he did, to reporter Brendan Vaughan in an article published in GQ magazine on October 21, 2015.

In 2023, a podcast series titled The War Within: The Robert Bales Story covered the story of the Kandahar massacre, and featured audio recordings of extensive interviews with Bales, as well as commentary from soldiers, lawyers, medical experts, and Afghan civilians who were involved with the case in various capacities.

== Personal life ==
Bales is married and has two children.

After the massacre, his family was moved from their home in Lake Tapps, Washington, for their protection.

The Bales family was struggling financially and had put its home up for sale three days before the shootings. The property was listed for $229,000, approximately $50,000 less than what they had paid for it in 2005, and was worth $100,000 less than what they owed the bank.
