= Insurgents' bodies incident =

Abuse of human remains in Afghanistan

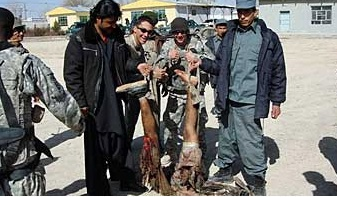
American soldiers from the U.S. Army's 82nd Airborne Division and Afghan policemen pose with the corpse of a suicide bomber.

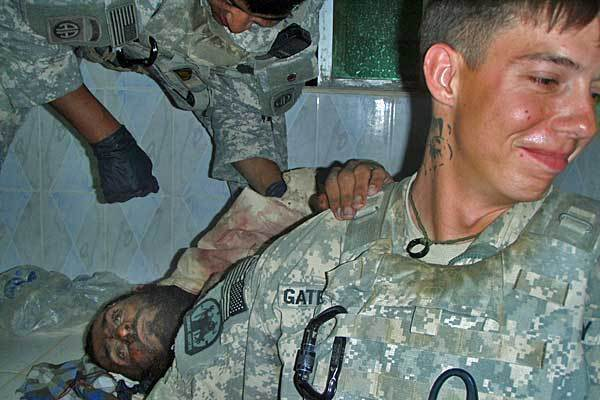
A U.S. Army soldier from the 82nd Airborne Division with a dead insurgent's hand on his shoulder.

The Insurgents' bodies incident is an incident involving American soldiers and Afghan policemen who posed with body parts of dead insurgents during the War in Afghanistan.

On April 18, 2012, the Los Angeles Times released photos of U.S. soldiers posing with body parts of dead insurgents, after a soldier in the 82nd Airborne Division gave the photos to the Los Angeles Times to draw attention to "a breakdown in security, discipline and professionalism" among U.S. troops operating in Afghanistan. The pictures had been taken at a police station in Zabol province in February 2010.

The event followed two other recent and embarrassing revelations about soldier morale and discipline in the US army: the case of soldiers urinating on dead Taliban soldiers in 2011, which was made public in January 2012, and the burning of the Quran at Bagram Airfield, which had occurred in February 2012.

== Detail ==
On April 18, 2012 the Los Angeles Times released photos of U.S. soldiers from the 82nd Airborne Division posing with body parts of dead insurgents, after a soldier in the 4th Brigade Combat Team, 82nd Airborne Division gave the photos to the LA Times to draw attention to "a breakdown in security, discipline and professionalism" among U.S. troops operating in Afghanistan.

The incident involved a paratrooper platoon from the 82nd Airborne Division which was charged with two missions, one of which involved the inspecting and identifying of the remains of insurgent suicide bombers. The first mission occurred in Afghanistan's Zabul province in February 2010. The platoon visited a police station in the provincial capital of Qalat where the Afghan police kept the disfigured body of a person whose legs were severed. The paratroopers were told by the police that the severed legs belonged to a suicide bomber that attempted to attack a police unit. Posing with Afghan police officers, some paratroopers held the corpse's severed legs.

According to the Los Angeles Times, the platoon was directed by the second mission to the morgue in Qalat in late April or early May 2012. Here the paratroopers would identify three insurgents whose explosives had detonated accidentally as they were preparing a roadside bomb according to Afghan police. After taking a few fingerprints, then troops posed grinning and mugging for photographs next to the remains. The Los Angeles Times reported that two troops held a dead man's hand and raised their middle finger in a photo. A soldier gripped the man's hand and leaned over the bearded corpse. Alongside other remnants, an unofficial platoon patch that said "Zombie Hunter" was affixed, and a photo was taken.

== Reactions ==
=== American ===
The Los Angeles Times showed copies of the whole 18 photos to the United States Army which launched an investigation into the incident. U.S. Army spokesman George Wright said that posing with corpses for photographs outside of officially sanctioned purposes is a violation of Army standards. "Such actions fall short of what we expect of our uniformed service members in deployed areas," according to Wright, who also said that after the end of the investigation the Army would "take appropriate action" against the involved persons. U.S. Army spokeswoman LTC Margaret Kageleiry told the L.A. Times that most of the soldiers which are seen on the photos have been identified.

U.S. Secretary of Defense Leon E. Panetta called the soldiers behavior unacceptable, promised a full investigation and said about the soldiers behavior in comparison to the U.S. armed forces in general: "This is not who we are, and it's certainly not what we represent when it comes to the great majority of men and women in uniform." The actions of the soldiers were condemned by General John Allen, commander of the International Security Assistance Force in Afghanistan (ISAF). US Ambassador to Afghanistan Ryan Crocker said: "The actions were morally repugnant, dishonor the sacrifices of hundreds of thousands of U.S. soldiers and civilians who have served with distinction in Afghanistan, and do not represent the core values of the United States or our military." The New York Times reported that according to White House sources, President Barack Obama called for an investigation of the matter and said that those responsible would be held accountable.

=== Afghan ===
Taliban spokesman Zabiullah Mujahid called the pictures disrespectful, and condemned both the U.S. soldiers involved in the pictures as well as the Afghan police also featured in them. "We strongly condemn these occupiers and their puppets who are without culture, who are brutal and inhumane," Mujahid said. "Next to these occupiers there are some Afghans—puppets—who were ordered to stand next to the bodies of the martyrs." Afghan President Hamid Karzai said that it is "a disgusting act to take photos with body parts and then share it with others".

As of 19 April 2012, there has been no news of mass protests by the Afghan people such as after the Quran burnings in February 2012, which Afghan lawmakers ascribe to the Afghan people's lack of sympathy for suicide bombers. Mohammad Naim Lalai Hamidzai, a parliamentarian from southern Kandahar, told the Associated Press that "the people of Afghanistan remember the killing of innocent people by suicide bombers and people do not have a good image of these suicide bombers. The burning of Qurans and the killing of children create emotions in people, but there is no sympathy for suicide bombers who kill innocent people." Another reason for the muted reaction in Afghanistan was that evening TV bulletins did not show the photos, and that many ordinary Afghans have no internet access.

== Investigation and action ==
On the day of the release, the U.S. Army announced that it had started a criminal investigation. By 2018, there were no reports freely available on the World Wide Web about the results of the investigation. On May 4, 2012, however, weeks after the pictures' release, U.S. Secretary of Defense Leon E. Panetta visited Ft. Benning, Georgia and spoke to the 3rd Infantry Brigade about the need for discipline. He said, "These days it takes only seconds for a picture, a photo, to suddenly become an international headline. And those headlines can impact the mission we're engaged in. They can put your fellow service members at risk. They can hurt morale. They can damage our standing in the world, and they can cost lives." The case appears to have ended, at least publicly, with that speech.

== See also ==
- Abu Ghraib torture and prisoner abuse
