= Anti-American sentiment in Afghanistan =

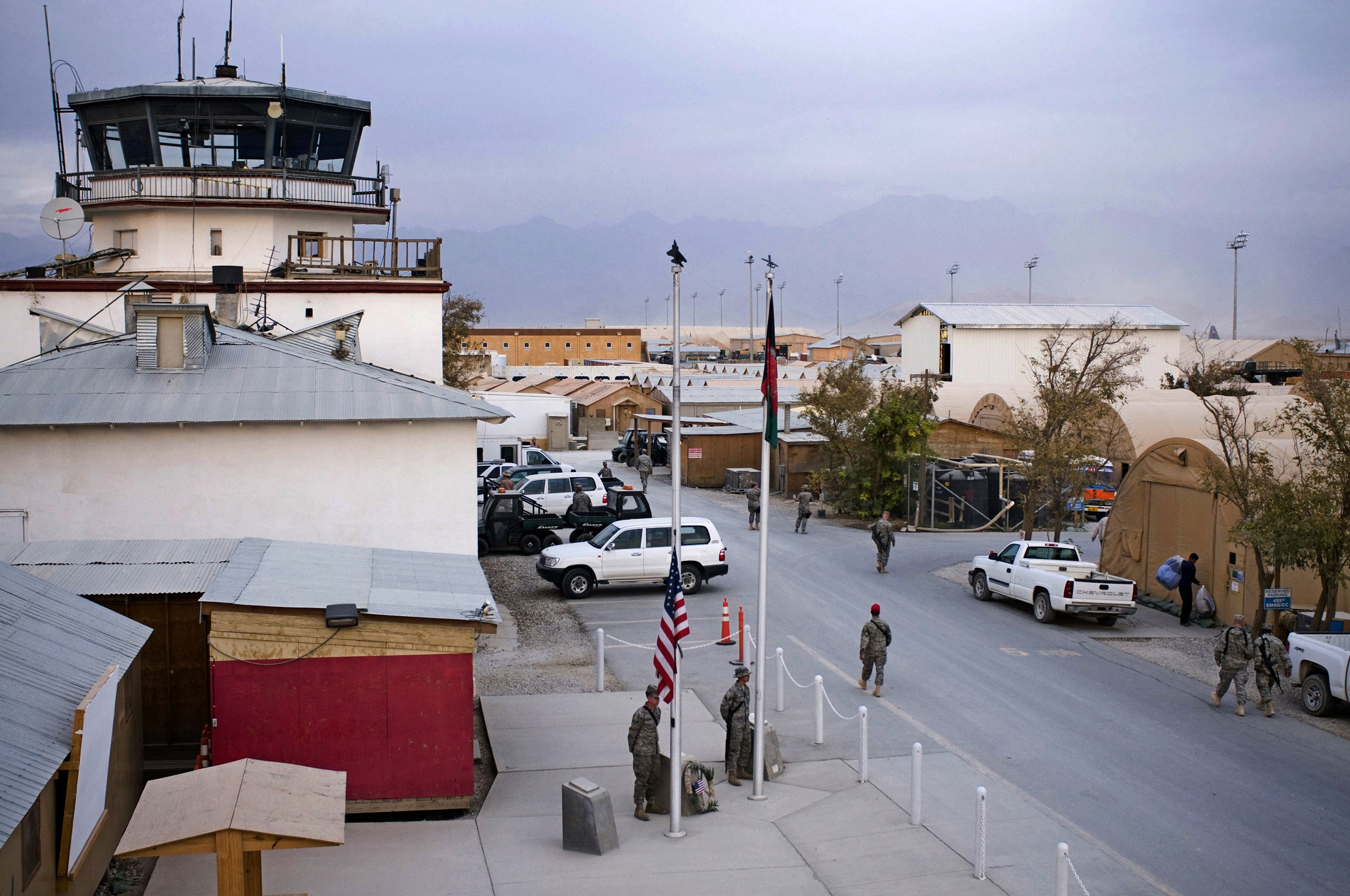
The Quran burning incident inflamed anti-American sentiment among Afghans.

Anti-American sentiment in Afghanistan has been encouraged by the Quran burning incident and the leaking online of a video of US troops urinating on Taliban fighters. Drone strikes have also led to growing anti-Americanism in and beyond Afghanistan.

After the Fall of Kabul in 2021, Taliban parade 'mock funerals' coffins draped in UK and US flags for NATO powers, as they celebrate 'independence day'. Badri 313 Battalion released an image mocking the famed photo of US soldiers raising the American flag on Iwo Jima.

== See also ==
- Anti-American sentiment
- Parwan Detention Facility at Bagram Airfield
- Haditha killings
- Maywand District killings
- How the World Sees America
- Anti-Afghan sentiment in the United States
