= Habibullah Jan (disambiguation) =

Habibullah Jan may refer to:

- Habibullah Jan (Gardez) denounced Guantanamo captive Kakai Khan
- Habibullah Jan (Nimroz), a district administrator, assassinated on February 25, 2003—see 2003 in Afghanistan
- Habibullah Jan, a Wolesi Jirga representative, assassinated on July 5, 2008
