= Midwest Joint Regional Correctional Facility =

Built in 2010, newer of two military prisons at Fort Leavenworth, Kansas

Coordinates: 39.3736°N 94.9439°W

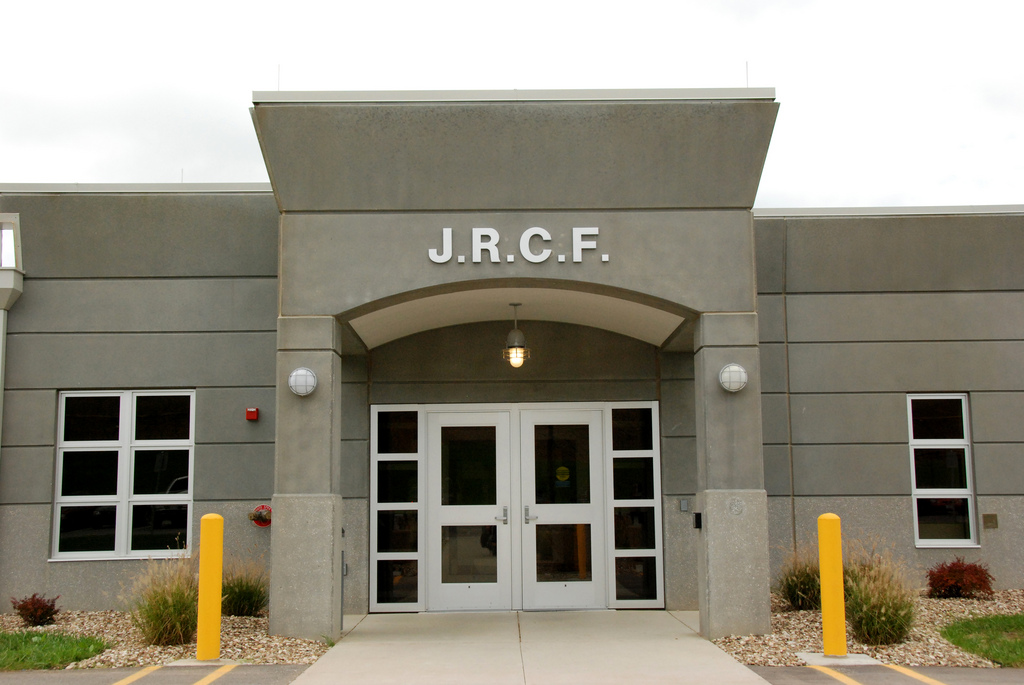
Official Army photo of the prison in 2011

The Midwest Joint Regional Correctional Facility (JRCF) is a military prison at 831 Sabalu Road, Fort Leavenworth, Kansas, which opened in 2010.

The 224,736-square-foot (20,878.7 m^{2}) prison on 45 acres (18 ha) has a design specification of 512 beds with 43 in special housing and the rest in general housing and dormitory. The prison handles inmates sentenced to terms of ten years or less. It also will house people who are awaiting trial.

It is one of three major federal prisons on federal land in Leavenworth. The civilian prison Federal Correction Institution, Leavenworth, is outside the boundaries of Fort Leavenworth on the southwest edge and the military United States Disciplinary Barracks is on the northeast side near the Sherman Army Airfield. The Joint Regional Correctional Facility is across Coffin Road just southwest of the Disciplinary Barracks.

The prison opened as part of the Base Realignment and Closure with the consolidating (and closing) of prisons in Lackland Air Force Base, Fort Sill, and Fort Knox.

The prison, rather than using traditional block house construction, utilizes modular cells.

The facility has 480 geothermal wells, each 280 feet (85 m) deep to handle its cooling and heating.

The street reaching it is named for Master Sergeant Wilberto Sabalu Jr., an Army corrections non-commissioned officer killed in a small arms attack in the Afghanistan war on 6 May 2007.

== Notable inmates ==
The following inmates were confined to J.R.C.F. while awaiting trial by court-martial, and were transferred to the Disciplinary Barracks following their convictions.

- Chelsea Manning, accused of leaking government documents in 2010 to WikiLeaks.
- Robert Bales, accused of killing 16 Afghan civilians in the Kandahar massacre on 11 March 2012.
