= Habibullah Jan =

Afghan warlord

- Died: July 4, 2008
- Occupations: Warlord, legislator

Habibullah Jan (died July 4, 2008) was an Afghan warlord who was elected to represent Kandahar Province in Afghanistan's Wolesi Jirga, the lower house of the national legislature, in 2005. He was a member of the Alizai tribe. He sat on the "Kandahar Security Shura". He was a "sometimes rival of [President] Karzai", according to a report prepared at the Navy Postgraduate School. Karzai created the Zhari District out of parts of Maywand and Panjwai districts in 2004 as reward for Habibullah Jan helping defeat the Taliban in Kandahar.

He was assassinated by gunmen on July 4, 2008, while returning from a visit to an Afghan army outpost in Zhari District. The Navy School report asserted his assassins were Taliban.
