= Murder of Farkhunda Malikzada =

2015 public lynching of an Afghan woman in Kabul

- Part of Islamic extremism and violence against women in Afghanistan
- Snapshot of the video showing Malikzada bleeding while being swarmed and beaten by a mob near the Shah-Do Shamshira Mosque
- Location: 34°31′31″N 69°10′42″E; Kabul, Afghanistan
- Date: 19 March 2015; 11 years ago
- Target: Farkhunda Malikzada (aged 27)
- Attack type: Mob lynching via bludgeoning and dragging by car
- Weapons: Stones, sticks, motor vehicle
- Deaths: 1 (Malikzada)
- No. of participants: 50+
- Motive: False accusation that Malikzada had burned the Quran

The murder of Farkhunda Malikzada was committed by a mob in Kabul, Afghanistan, on 19 March 2015. Malikzada, a 27-year-old Afghan woman, had been involved in an argument with a street vendor over his practice of selling amulets when he publicly accused her of burning the Quran, attracting a large group of people from the Shah-Do Shamshira Mosque. Shortly thereafter, she was publicly lynched, with several members of the mob bludgeoning her and then running her over with a car, which dragged her for nearly 100 metres (330 ft). Subsequently bringing her near the Kabul River, the mob, while yelling the takbir and anti-American slogans, took turns further bludgeoning her corpse before setting it on fire, with some of the assailants ripping off parts of their clothes to use for kindling, as Malikzada's clothes were soaked in blood and her corpse would not stay burning.

In the aftermath of Malikzada's lynching, a number of Muslim clerics and Afghan government officials stated that she had desecrated Islam in order to gain American citizenship, and a police investigation was also launched to determine whether she had truly burned the Quran. When it was revealed that she had not done so, 49 people were arrested in connection with her death and protests erupted throughout Kabul. Three men were sentenced to 20 years in prison, another eight men were sentenced to 16 years in prison, and a 20-year-old man who had fabricated his birth certificate in an attempt to present himself as a legal minor was sentenced to 10 years in prison. Additionally, 11 police officers received one-year prison sentences for their failure to protect Malikzada from the mob.

Malikzada's murder was condemned by the United States and the European Union, and drew renewed international attention to the issue of women's rights in Afghanistan. Later that year, the Solidarity Party of Afghanistan sponsored the construction of a memorial for her in Kabul.

== Background ==
Farkhunda was an observant Muslim who wore a veil (hijab). At the time of her murder, she had just finished a degree in Islamic studies and was preparing to take a teaching post. Her name means "auspicious" and "jubilation" in Dari.

== Murder ==
Farkhunda had previously been arguing with a local cleric named Zainuddin in front of Shah-Do Shamshira Mosque where she worked as a religious teacher, about his practice of selling amulets. During this argument, Zainuddin reportedly accused her of burning the Quran. She responded:

"I am a Muslim, and Muslims do not burn the Quran!"

Hundreds of angry radicals flocked to the shrine upon overhearing the mullah's accusation. Police arrived and attempted to lead Farkhunda to a local precinct building one mile away, but she refused, asking for a female police officer to accompany her. The mob was able to drag Farkhunda away into the street where they knocked her to the ground and began beating and kicking her. More police arrived, firing warning shots into the air and temporarily dispersing the crowd. They moved her into the Shah-Do Shamshira Mosque in an attempt to shield her. As the crowd grew in size and rumors that she was working with Americans began circulating, the mob attempted to storm the shrine. Police hoisted her onto the roof of the building in an attempt to rescue her from the crowd, but Farkhunda, struck by stones and planks thrown by the mob, suddenly slipped and fell into the crowd.

The mob dragged Farkhunda into the street and beat and stomped her. She was bludgeoned with sticks and rocks outside the mosque, then placed into the road and run over with a car, dragging her body almost 100 metres (330 ft). Police offered no resistance, and directed traffic around the scene. The mob then dragged her body to the nearby bank of the Kabul River, took turns stoning her and set her on fire. Her body was soaked in blood and would not burn, so the crowd ripped off articles of their own clothing to ignite and maintain the fire. The mob shouted the Takbir during the lynching, including after they were certain Farkhunda was dead.

Farkhunda's parents said the killing was instigated by the mullah Farkhunda had been speaking to. According to Tolo News he loudly accused her of burning the Quran "in order to save his job and life." An eyewitness said that the mob was chanting anti-American slogans while beating Farkhunda. The mob was captured on video accusing her of working with Americans, and of being a French embassy worker.

== Funeral ==
On 22 March, a number of women, dressed in black, carried Farkhunda's coffin from an ambulance to a prayer ground and then to a graveyard called Pansad Family (پانصد فميلى in Persian) in Chaikhana, a northern neighborhood of Kabul. This was a marked departure from tradition, which holds that such funerals are typically only attended by men. At the end of 2015, it was reported that Farkhunda's grave was half-finished.

== Investigation ==
Of 49 suspects tried in the case, four men were originally sentenced to death for their roles in Farkhunda's lynching. The sentences were handed down by Judge Safiullah Mojadedi in Kabul on 5 May 2015. Eight other defendants were sentenced to 16 years in prison. The trial was noted for its unusual brevity, lasting just two days. The verdict has been criticized because although some investigators believe a fortuneteller set the attacks on Farkhunda in motion, this person was found not guilty on appeal. According to Judge Mojadedi, three suspects in the lynching were still at large at the time of the 5 May sentencing.

On 19 May 2015, eleven police officers including the local district police chief were sentenced to one year in prison for failing to protect Farkhunda.

On 2 July 2015, an appeals court overturned the capital punishment of the four men condemned in the lynching. Three of those had their sentences reduced to 20 years in jail, while the fourth was re-sentenced to 10 years prompting street protests and a debate on women's rights. The chief of police and a caretaker of the Shah-Do Shamshira shrine where the murder occurred were acquitted.

In August 2015, an examination of the outcome of the proceedings in the matter by a panel of lawyers appointed by President Ashraf Ghani resulted in a planned recommendation to the Supreme Court of Afghanistan that those accused in her death be retried.

On 19 March 2016, the Women's Political Participation Committee, an Afghan civil society organization, called for reevaluation of the Supreme Court's decisions with more transparency.

=== Supreme Court of Afghanistan ===
- Zainuddin was "the custodian of a holy shrine who trafficked in Viagra, condoms and pagan amulets, and who, when exposed, falsely accused a young woman named Farkhunda of burning a Quran." His sentence was reduced from capital punishment to 20 years, which are to be served in the Pul-e-Charkhi prison.
- Sharaf Baghlani served as an agent of the Afghan National Directorate of Security (NDS). He claimed to have been the one who delivered the fatal blow to Farkhunda. His sentence was also reduced from capital punishment to 20 years in the same prison.
- Abdul Basheer was the man who drove his vehicle over Farkhunda. His sentence was also reduced from capital punishment to 20 years in prison.
- Muhammad Yaqoub was filmed throwing a large rock the size of a watermelon onto Farkhunda’s face. He claimed to be 17 years old at the time of the crime, and must serve only 10 years due to being a minor.

== National reactions ==
=== Support and opposition ===
Immediately after her death, a number of prominent public officials turned to Facebook in support of her murder. A spokesman for the Kabul police Hashmat Stanekzai, wrote that Farkhunda "thought, like several other unbelievers, that this kind of action and insult will get them U.S. or European citizenship. But before reaching their target, they lost their life."

After it was revealed that she did not burn the Quran, the public reaction in Afghanistan turned to shock and anger. Hundreds of protesters took to the streets of Kabul on 23 March protesting her brutal death. Protesters marched from where the attack began to where Farkhunda was thrown in the river. A number of women on the march wore masks of her bloodied face while others condemned the government for failing to bring security to Afghanistan. Shukria Barakzai, a member of parliament representing Kabul Province and a longtime women’s rights activist, told Al Jazeera that her killing had triggered the city and the rest of the country to think about women's rights. She said: "This is not a male or female issue, this is a human issue and we will not stop until the killers are brought to justice." Roshan Siren, a former member of parliament, said that the murder highlights violence against women in the country, and has become a rallying point for a younger generation of women to campaign for "the protection and progress of women."

Farkhunda’s father expressed that police could have done more to save her.

==== Protests ====
On 23 March, hundreds of women protested the attack, demanding that the government prosecute those responsible for Farkhunda's murder. The protest was organized by Solidarity Party of Afghanistan and residents of Kabul. Farkhunda's murder has also become a rallying point for women's rights activists in Afghanistan. On 24 March, thousands of people protested the attack in front of the Afghan Ministry of Justice in Kabul. On 27 April, Leena Alam and her co- actors re-enacted the attack during a protest in Kabul, in what Afghan observers called an unprecedented case of a public theatrical performance commemorating a woman's murder.

=== Government of Afghanistan ===
Afghan president Ashraf Ghani ordered an investigation into the incident and, in a statement released by his office, condemned the "act of extreme violence". He described the killing as "heinous". He also said that Farkhunda's murder revealed that Afghanistan's police were too focused on the Taliban insurgency in the country and not focused enough on local policing.

Nine men who were seen in the video of Farkhunda's murder on social media were subsequently detained. The Interior Ministry later reported that 28 people were arrested and 13 police officers suspended as part of investigations. Hashmat Stanikzai, an official spokesman for the Kabul police who publicly endorsed the murder, was sacked over comments that he made on social media supporting Farkhunda's killers.

The Afghanistan Ministry of Hajj and Religious Affairs announced that it found no evidence that Farkhunda had burned the Quran.

Following a campaign by protesters who put boards replacing the Andarabi Road sign with "Farkhunda Road" where she was murdered, the cabinet of President Ghani in a meeting approved to officially rename the part of the road to Martyr Farkhunda Road (جاده شاهد).

A monument has been erected in her honor in Kabul.

== International reactions ==
=== United States ===
US attorney Kimberley Motley represented Farkhunda's family in the first court. After the first court hearing Motley stated that Farkhunda's trial was a defining moment for women's rights in Afghanistan. In the first hearing, Motley indicated that there were twenty-two convictions which included four death sentences, eight people were given sixteen years in prison, and ten police officers were convicted for their failure in protecting Farkhunda. Due to pressures that Motley and the family received from the Afghan Government she did not represent the family in the subsequent court hearings.

In a "secret" Appellate Court Hearing and when the death sentences were overturned in a secret hearing held 43 days after Motley termed the ruling as "shocking." Motley further stated that, "The rule of law is the foundation of any civilised society. If the courts don’t get this decision right then you have to ask how serious it is about progressing the rights of women. Justice for Farkhunda is a reflection of how women will be treated in Afghanistan in the future."

In a scathing op-ed Motley wrote, "Promises of a transparent legal process were once again shattered by the Afghan judiciary. This week, its precipitous decision regarding the Farkhunda case was leaked from a "secret" hearing in the Appellate Court. Blatantly disregarding the law, the court decided that the men convicted of having a primary role in Farkhunda's horrific death were entitled to a reduction in their sentence. Assertions of corruption mean absolutely nothing if those that are in power - like the Appellate Court judges - are allowed to continue to perpetrate such legal atrocities. The inability of the judiciary to handle Farkhunda's case in a fair and equal manner simply reinforces questions about its commitment to progress the status of women in Afghanistan."

Afghan American historian Ali A Olomi argued that Farkhunda's murder demonstrated the endurance of an underlying culture of violence and devaluation of human life that comes out of generations of Afghans being raised during a war and facing oppression.

=== European Union ===
The European Union condemned the attack. A spokeswoman for European Union foreign policy chief Federica Mogherini said in a statement that "the killing of Ms. Farkhunda... is a tragic reminder of dangers women face from false accusations and the lack of justice in Afghanistan." She added, "We all hope that [those] responsible can be brought to justice." The United States also condemned the murder, with a statement from its embassy in Kabul calling for "those responsible to be brought to justice so such heinous acts will never occur again".

== Reaction from Islamic scholars ==
=== Afghanistan ===
The day after the murder, certain imams and mullahs endorsed the killing during Friday prayer services in their mosques. One of them, the influential Maulavi Ayaz Niazi of the Wazir Akbar Khan mosque, warned the government that any attempt to arrest the men who had "defended the Quran" would lead to an uprising.

After it was revealed she did not burn the Quran, senior Islamic scholars in Afghanistan expressed outrage over the incident. Ahmad Ali Jebreili, a member of Afghanistan's Ulama Council set for administering Islamic law, condemned the attack, accusing it of contravening Islam. Haji Noor Ahmad, a local cleric, said "People come and execute a person arbitrarily; this is totally prohibited and unlawful. However, some justified her killing and were met with public anger."

Yama Rasaw of the International Policy Digest blamed intolerance among Afghans and Muslims for the killing of Farkhunda.

=== Pakistan ===
Abu Ammaar Yasir Qadhi, a prominent, conservative, Islamic scholar, expressed horror on his Facebook page and said "A sign of how truly civilized a nation is, is how it treats its women. May Allah restore the honor and respect that women deserve in our societies!"

== See also ==
- Freedom of religion
  - Freedom of religion in Afghanistan
  - Apostasy in Islam
  - Islam and blasphemy
- Violence against women
  - Women's rights in Afghanistan
- Lynching of Mashal Khan
