= Abdul Ali Deobandi =

Afghan Muslim cleric (1938–2009)

Mawlawi Abdul Ali Deobandi
- عبد العلي دیوبندي

Personal life
- Born: 1938 Lakukhil, Singesar, Kingdom of Afghanistan
- Died: 2 November 2009 (aged 70–71)
- Education: Darul Uloom Haqqania or Darul Uloom Deoband
- Occupation: Cleric

Religious life
- Religion: Sunni Islam
- Movement: Deobandi

Abdul Ali Deobandi (Pashto/Dari: عبد العلي دیوبندي; 1938 – 2 November 2009) was a pro-Taliban Afghan cleric who served as Mullah Omar's advisor. He earned the title of Sheikh al-Hadith and Mufassir.

== Life ==
Abdul Ali was born in Lakukhil in 1938 to Mawlana Sher Muhammad, a cleric. He received basic religious education from his father. Later, he went to Kandahar to pursue higher education at Muhammadiyah School. Subsequently, he studied sharia at Darul Uloom Haqqania in Akora Khattak in 1964. However, other sources mentioned that he enrolled at Darul Uloom Deoband.

Upon finishing his Sharia studies, Abdul Ali went back to Afghanistan and taught Islam in several areas in Kandahar. After the Saur Revolution, Abdul Ali called for jihad against the communist government. He then fled to Pakistan and continued teaching to mujahideen. He only returned to Afghanistan after the fall of the Democratic Republic of Afghanistan. As he returned, he resumed teaching and became a mediator among warring factions in his area. During the first Taliban government, Abdul Ali taught hadith in Kandahar and worked as a radio host on Voice of Sharia, answering Islamic questions about worship, beliefs, transactions, politics, Islamic economics, and personal status. Other than that, he also served as Mullah Omar's ideology advisor, albeit he did not hold any position in the government. Abdul Ali was believed to have fled to Pakistan in 2001. In early 2006, he was reportedly living in Quetta. He died on 2 November 2009 from natural causes.

== Views and writings ==
Abdul Ali was against teaching women reading and writing, even at home. Additionally, he also believed that women were prohibited from attending congregational prayers. He assumed that allowing women to learn reading and writing or attend congregational prayers "leads to women's corruption" because the present times were "temptation". Abdul Ali forbade women from using mobile phones since they utilized them to "form relationships and turn to immorality and vices."

Answering a question from a listener on the Mausoleum of Imam Ali, Abdul Ali stipulated that there was no Ali's grave in the shrine, and the tomb was built on a former Zoroastrian fire temple. He also stated that the ceremonies held there were Bid'ah.

Abdul Ali has issued around 700 fatwas and authored six published books in Pashto and Farsi:

Farsi

- Nasr al-Ahbaab Ala Raghm al-Murtab
- Nasb al-Khiyam Fi Rad al-Awham

Pashto

- Nasir al-Islam Fi Akhbar Sayyid al-Anam
- Bulugh al-Maram Fi Ta'lim al-Islam
- Nasrat al-Islam
- Irshad al-Masail Bayn al-Haq wa al-Batil

== See also ==
- List of Deobandis
