= Kandahar massacre =

2012 murders by a U.S. soldier in Afghanistan

- Location of the massacre in the Kandahar Province in Afghanistan
- Location: 31.527°N 65.499°E; Panjwai District, Kandahar Province, Islamic Republic of Afghanistan
- Date: 11 March 2012; 14 years ago 03:00 AFT (UTC+04:30)
- Attack type: Triple home invasion, spree killing, mass murder
- Weapons: M4 carbine with M203 grenade launcher and an M9 pistol. Some victims were found stabbed in addition to being shot.
- Deaths: 16
- Injuries: 6
- Victim: Afghan civilians
- Perpetrator: Robert Bales

The Kandahar massacre, also called the Panjwai massacre, was a mass murder that occurred in the early hours of 11 March 2012, when United States Army Staff Sergeant Robert Bales murdered 16 Afghan civilians and wounded six others in the Panjwayi District of Kandahar Province, Afghanistan. Nine of his victims were children, and 11 of the dead were from the same family. Some of the corpses were partially burned. Bales was taken into custody later that morning when he told authorities, "I did it".

The U.S. and International Security Assistance Force (ISAF) authorities apologized for the deaths. Afghan authorities condemned the act, describing it as "intentional murder". The National Assembly of Afghanistan passed a resolution demanding a public trial in Afghanistan. Still, then-U.S. Secretary of Defense Leon Panetta said the soldier would be tried under U.S. military law. Bales pleaded guilty on 5 June 2013 to 16 counts of premeditated murder in exchange for the prosecution not seeking a death sentence. At the time of the plea, he said he did not know why he committed the murders. On 23 August 2013, Bales was sentenced to life in prison without the possibility of parole.

United States authorities concluded that the killings were the act of a single individual. On 15 March 2012, an Afghan parliamentary probe team consisting of several members of the National Assembly of Afghanistan had speculated that up to 20 U.S. soldiers were involved in the killings. The team later said they could not confirm claims that multiple soldiers participated in the massacre.

== Background ==
=== "Surge" in southern Afghanistan ===
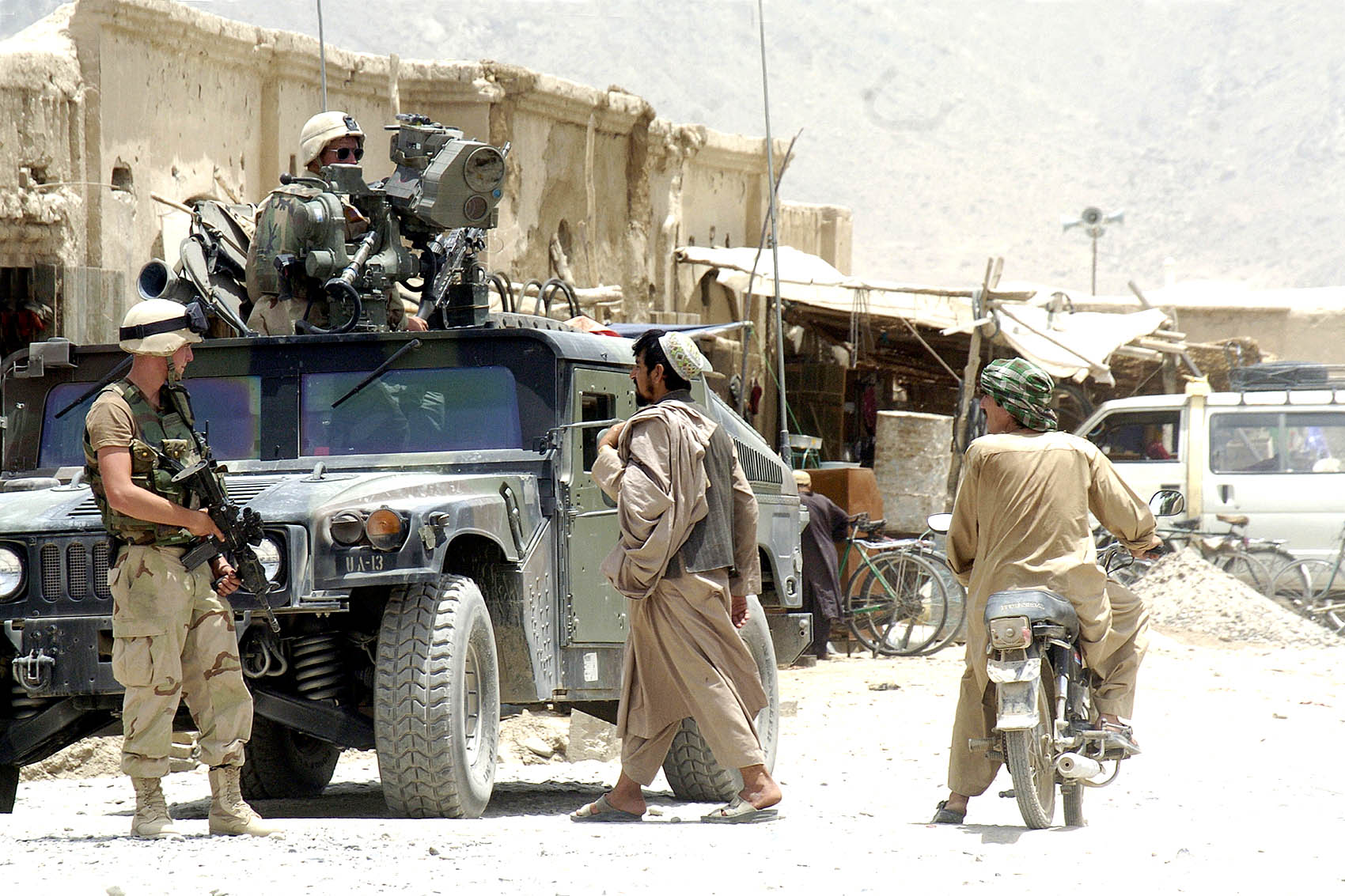
U.S. soldiers patrolling the Panjwayi district near Kandahar in 2004

Panjwai is the birthplace of the Taliban movement and has traditionally been a stronghold of the Taliban. It has been an area of heavy fighting and was the focus of a military surge in 2010, which brought a more than two-fold increase in airstrikes, night raids into Afghan homes, insurgent casualties, and a six-fold increase in special forces operations throughout Afghanistan.

Fighting in Panjwai and adjacent Zhari, Arghandab, and Kandahar districts was particularly intense. The conflict between the civilian population and U.S. forces was exacerbated by the wholesale destruction of some villages by U.S. forces, mass arrests, murder of civilians by rogue units, and high casualties from improvised explosive devices (IEDs). One of the families targeted in the Kandahar massacre returned to the area in 2011 after being displaced by the surge. Fearing the Taliban but encouraged by the U.S. government, the Army, and the Afghan government, they settled near the U.S. military base because they thought it would be a safe place to live.

Approximately three weeks before the incidents, Afghan–U.S. relations were strained by an incident where copies of the Quran were burnt at the Bagram Air Base. A couple of months before the shootings, U.S. Marines were videorecorded urinating on dead Taliban fighters.

=== Allegations of issues at Fort Lewis ===
The shooter, Robert Bales, was based at Joint Base Lewis-McChord (JBLM). The primary medical treatment facility at the base, Madigan Army Medical Center, has come under investigation for downgrading diagnoses of soldiers with PTSD to lesser ailments. Military support groups around the base have alleged that base commanders did not give returning troops sufficient time to recover before sending them on further deployments and that the base's medical unit was understaffed and overwhelmed by the numbers of returning veterans with deployment-related physical and psychological trauma.

Soldiers from the base have been linked to other atrocities and crimes. The 2010 Maywand District murders involved JBLM-based soldiers. Also in 2010, a recently discharged AWOL soldier from JBLM shot a police officer in Salt Lake City. In April 2011, a JBLM soldier killed his wife and 5-year-old son before killing himself. In January 2012, a JBLM soldier murdered a Mount Rainier National Park ranger. In two separate incidents, unrelated JBLM soldiers have been charged with waterboarding their children.

Jorge Gonzalez, executive director of a veterans resource center near Fort Lewis, said that the Kandahar killings offer more proof that the base was dysfunctional: "This was not a rogue soldier. JBLM is a rogue base, with a severe leadership problem", he said in a statement. Base officials responded, saying that the crimes committed by its soldiers were isolated events which do not "reflect on the work and dedication of all service members." Robert H. Scales, a retired U.S. Army major general and former commandant of the Army War College, suggested that the major factor in the shootings was the overuse of infantry personnel in the last ten years for close combat in Iraq, Afghanistan, and elsewhere.

=== 8 March roadside bombing ===
Residents of Mokhoyan, a village about 500 metres east of Camp Belamby, stated that a bomb had exploded in their vicinity on 8 March, destroying an armored vehicle and wounding several U.S. soldiers. They recounted that U.S. soldiers afterwards lined many of the male villagers against a wall, threatening to "get revenge for this incident by killing at least 20 of your people", and threatening that "you and your children will pay for this". One Mokhoyan resident told The Associated Press "It looked like they were going to shoot us, and I was very afraid." U.S. officials from The Pentagon declared that they had "no evidence" that villagers had been lined up against a wall and threatened in Mokhoyan. U.S. officials refused to confirm or deny that U.S. soldiers were wounded outside the village on 8 March.

Bales' lawyer, John Henry Browne, later stated that his client was upset because a fellow soldier had lost a leg in an explosion on 9 March. It is unclear whether the bombing cited by Browne was the same as the one described by the villagers.

== Incident ==
=== Killings ===
Casualties
Killed
- Mohamed Dawood (son of Abdullah)
- Khudaydad (son of Mohamed Juma)
- Nazar Mohamed
- Payendo
- Robeena
- Shatarina (daughter of Sultan Mohamed)
- Zahra (daughter of Abdul Hamid)
- Nazia (daughter of Dost Mohamed)
- Masooma (daughter of Mohamed Wazir)
- Farida (daughter of Mohamed Wazir)
- Palwasha (daughter of Mohamed Wazir)
- Nabia (daughter of Mohamed Wazir)
- Esmatullah, age 16 (son of Mohamed Wazir)
- Faizullah, age 9 (son of Mohamed Wazir)
- Essa Mohamed (son of Mohamed Hussain)
- Akhtar Mohamed (son of Murrad Ali)

Wounded

- Haji Mohamed Naim (son of Haji Sakhawat)
- Mohamed Sediq (son of Mohamed Naim)
- Parween
- Rafiullah
- Zardana
- Zulheja

According to official reports, Bales left combat outpost Camp Belamby at 3:00 a.m. local time wearing night vision goggles. Bales was wearing traditional Afghan clothing over his ACU. He wore no body armor.

According to government officials with knowledge of the investigation, the killings were carried out in two phases, with Bales returning to base in between. An Afghan guard reported a soldier returning to base at 1:30 am, and another guard reported a soldier leaving at 2:30 am. Bales is believed to have first gone to Alkozai, about 1/2 mile (0.80 km) north of Camp Belambay, then to Najiban (called Balandi in earlier reports), located 1 1/2 miles (2.4 km) south of the base. Four people were killed and six wounded in Alkozai, and twelve people were killed in Najiban. U.S. sentries at the base heard gunshots in Alkozai but did not take action besides attempting to view Alkozai from their post inside the base. Until 22 March, U.S. authorities recognized sixteen people killed, including nine children, four men, and three women. On 22 March that number was revised to seventeen, but later reduced back to sixteen. It was initially reported that five others were injured, and that number was eventually increased to six.

Four members of the same family were killed in Alkozai. According to a 16-year-old boy who was shot in the leg, Bales woke up his family members before shooting them. Another witness said she saw the man drag a woman out of her house and repeatedly hit her head against a wall.

The first victim in Najiban appears to have been Mohammad Dawood. According to Dawood's brother, Bales shot Dawood in the head but spared Dawood's wife and six children after the wife screamed at him.

Eleven members of Abdul Samad's family were killed in a house in Najiban village, including his wife, four girls between the ages of two and six, four boys between eight and twelve, and two other relatives. According to a witness, "he dragged the boys by their hair and shot them in the mouth". At least three of the child victims were killed by a single shot to the head of each. Their bodies were then set on fire. Another civilian, Mohammad Dawoud, age 55, was then killed in another village house. Witnesses reported that Bales was wearing a headlamp and/or a spotlight attached to his weapon.

Bales burned some of the victims' bodies. Witnesses said the eleven corpses from one family were shot in the head, stabbed, gathered into one room, and set on fire. A pile of ashes was found on the floor of one victims' house; at least one child's body was found partially charred. A reporter for The New York Times inspected the children's bodies taken to a nearby American military base and reported seeing burns on some of the legs and heads.

=== Surrender and confession ===
Following the events at Alkozai and Balandi, Bales handed himself over into ISAF custody. Afghan forces spotted him leaving his outpost before the killings and U.S. commanders on base assembled their troops for a head count when it was discovered that a soldier was missing. A patrol was dispatched to find the missing soldier but did not find him before he returned to base after the killings. He was reportedly taken into custody without incident. No military operations were being conducted in the area at the time of the shootings.

The surveillance video from the base reportedly shows "the soldier walking up to his base covered in a traditional Afghan shawl. The soldier removes the shawl and lays his weapon on the ground, then raises his arms in surrender." The video has not been released to the public.

U.S. investigators suspect Bales may have departed the base before midnight, committed the murders in Alkozai, then returned to the base around 1:30 a.m. Bales may have then departed the base at 2:30 a.m. and committed the murders in Najiban. Apparently, the second departure caused the alert and the commencement of the patrol to locate the missing soldier.

According to U.S. defense officials, upon his return to the base, Bales said: "I did it" and then told individuals what happened. Later he retained a lawyer and refused to speak further with investigators. The U.S. flew Bales out of Afghanistan to Kuwait on 14 March 2012, then to the United States Disciplinary Barracks at Fort Leavenworth in Kansas on 16 March. A Pentagon spokesman said the move was made because of a "legal recommendation".

=== Number of assailants ===
According to U.S. authorities, a single soldier – Staff Sergeant Robert Bales – conducted the attack. The U.S. military showed Afghan authorities the footage from the surveillance video at the base as proof that there was only one perpetrator of the shootings.

According to Reuters, some neighbors and relatives of the dead saw a group of U.S. soldiers arrive at their village at about 2 a.m., enter homes and open fire. "They were all drunk and shooting all over the place," said neighbor Agha Lala. According to The New York Times, one of the attack's survivors and "at least five other villagers" described seeing several soldiers, while some other Afghan residents described seeing only one gunman. One mother of six, whose husband was killed during the incident, reported involvement of a large number of people: "When they shot dead my husband, I tried to drag him into the house... I saw more than 20 people when I looked out the house. The Americans pointed their guns at me and threatened me, telling me not to leave the house or they'd kill me." An eight-year-old girl named Noorbinak, whose father was killed, reported that "one man entered the room and the others were standing in the yard, holding lights." The brother of another victim claimed his nephews and nieces had seen "numerous soldiers" with headlamps and lighted guns. Some elected officials said that they believed the attack was planned, claiming that one soldier could not have carried out such an act without help. In response, Afghan President Hamid Karzai appointed General Sher Mohammad Karimi to investigate the claims.

On 15 March 2012, an Afghan parliamentary probe team made up of several members of the National Assembly of Afghanistan announced that up to 20 American soldiers were involved in the killings, with support from two helicopters. They had spent two days in the province on-site, interviewing the survivors and collecting evidence. One of the probe team members, Hamizai Lali, said: "We closely examined the site of the incident, talked to the families who lost their beloved ones, the injured people and tribal elders... The villages are one and a half kilometer from the U.S. military base. We are convinced that one soldier cannot kill so many people in two villages within one hour... [the victims] have been killed by the two groups." Lali asked the Afghan government, the United Nations, and the international community to ensure the perpetrators were punished in Afghanistan. While visiting one of the affected villages, Hamid Karzai pointed to one of the villagers and said: "In his family, in four rooms people were killed – children and women were killed – and then they were all brought together in one room and then set on fire. That, one man cannot do." However, the team later said they could not confirm that multiple soldiers took part in the killings.

=== Financial payments to victims' families ===
On 25 March 2012, at the office of the governor of Kandahar province, the United States gave the equivalent of US$860,000 to the victims' families, allocated as $50,000 for each person killed and $10,000 for each person injured. The official who disbursed payments to the families said the money was not compensation but the U.S. government's offering to help the victims and their families. A member of the Kandahar provincial council described the payments as assistance, but not as the kind of legal compensation that would absolve the accused.

== Robert Bales ==
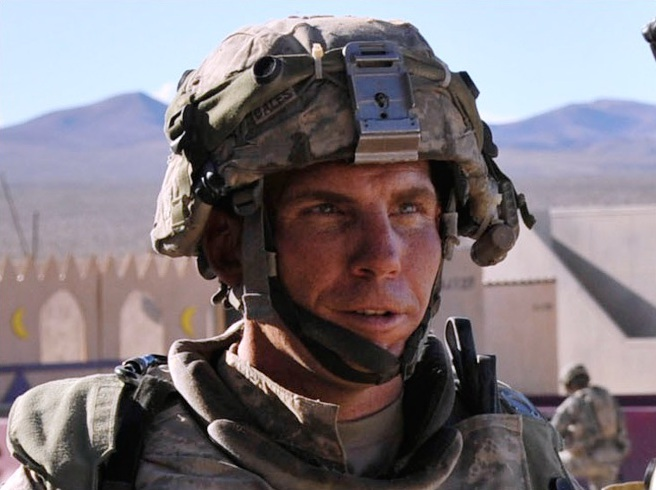
Staff Sgt. Robert Bales at the Fort Irwin National Training Center in August 2011.

The Army concluded that Robert Bales, a 38-year-old U.S. Army staff sergeant stationed at Camp Belambay, was the only person responsible for the shootings. According to Defense Secretary Leon Panetta, immediately after being captured, Bales acknowledged the killings and "told individuals what happened". He then asked for an attorney and refused to speak with investigators about his motivations.

According to officials, Bales may have been having marital problems, and the investigation of the shootings is looking into the possibility that an e-mail about marriage problems might have provoked Bales. His wife wrote on her blog about her disappointment after he was passed over for a promotion to Sergeant First Class (E-7). The family was also struggling with finances, and three days before the shootings Bales' wife put their home up for sale, as they had fallen behind with mortgage payments.

On 23 March 2012, the U.S. government charged Bales with 17 counts of murder, six counts of attempted murder, and six counts of assault. On 24 March 2012, American investigators said they believe Bales split the killings in the villages of Balandi and Alkozai into two attacks, returning to Camp Belamby after the first attack before slipping out again an hour later. No other U.S. military personnel were disciplined for having any role in the incident.

On 22 August 2013, Bales pleaded guilty at his General Court-martial, apologized for his killing spree, and described the massacre as an "act of cowardice." The plea spared Bales from the death penalty. On 23 August 2013, Bales was sentenced to life in prison without parole by the court. He was also demoted to Private (E-1), the lowest possible rank, dishonorably discharged, and ordered to forfeit all pay and allowances. A commanding general overseeing the court-martial has the option of reducing the sentence to life with the possibility of parole. Afghan villagers and the families of Bales' victims were upset by the decision, saying he deserved death.

After several months of interviews in prison in 2015, Bales revealed in depth his recollection of his actions step by step the night of the murders and why he believed he acted the way he did to reporter Brendan Vaughan in an article published in GQ magazine on 21 October 2015.

== Reactions ==
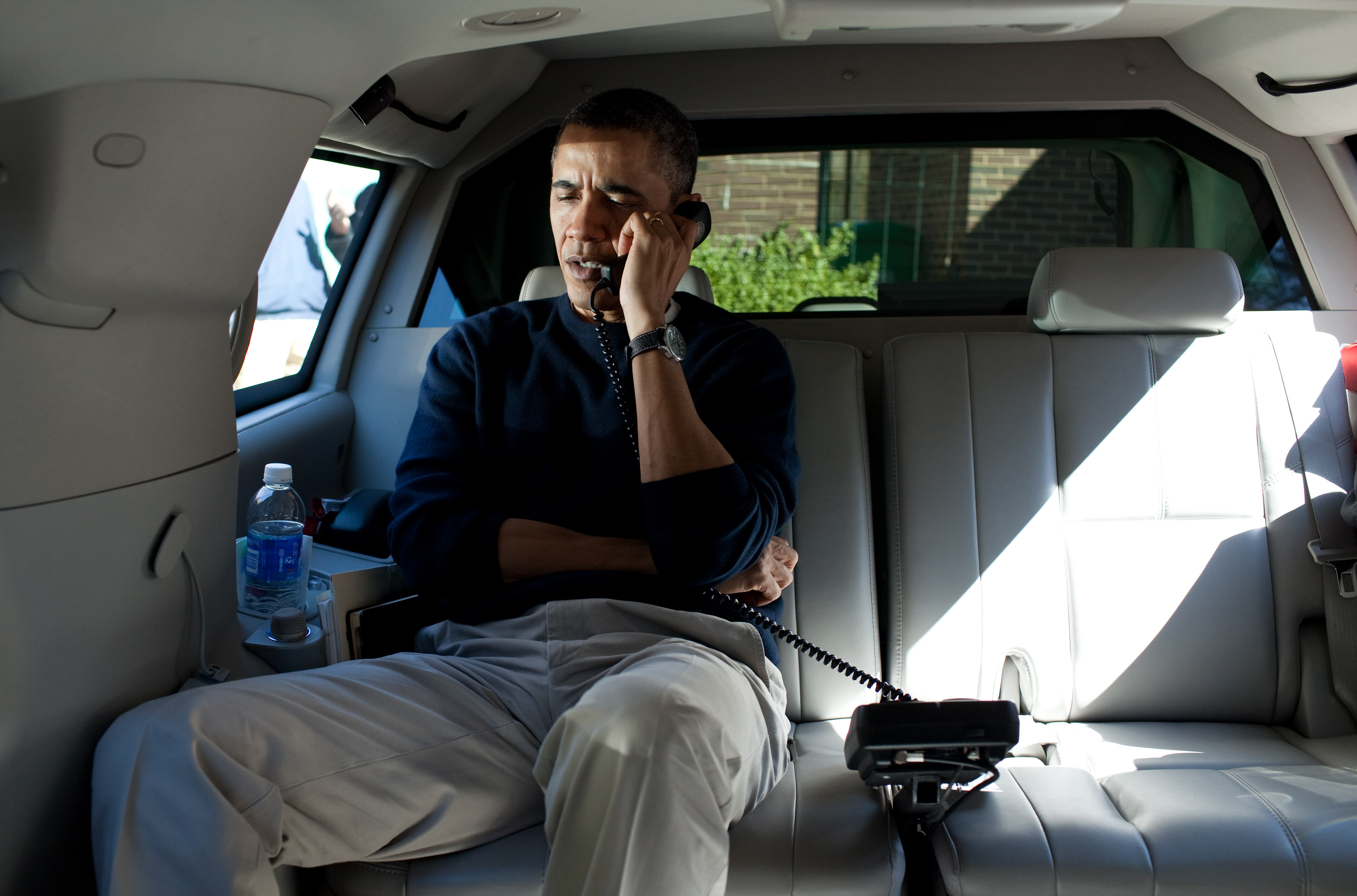
United States President Barack Obama speaks by phone to Afghanistan President Hamid Karzai following the killings.

=== Reaction from family members and Afghan society ===
A woman who lost four family members in the incident said, "We don't know why this foreign soldier came and killed our innocent family members. Either he was drunk or he enjoyed killing civilians." Abdul Samad, a 60-year-old farmer who lost eleven family members, eight of whom were children, spoke about the incident: "I don't know why they killed them. Our government told us to come back to the village, and then they let the Americans kill us." One grieving mother, holding a dead baby in her arms, said, "They killed a child, was this child the Taliban? Believe me, I haven't seen a two-year-old member of the Taliban yet."

"I don't want any compensation. I don't want money, I don't want a trip to Mecca, I don't want a house. I want nothing. But what I absolutely want is the punishment of the Americans. This is my demand, my demand, my demand and my demand," said one villager whose brother was killed.

More than 300 Panjwai locals gathered around the military base to protest the killings. Some brought burned blankets to represent those killed. In one house, an elderly woman screamed: "May God kill the only son of Karzai, so he feels what we feel." On 13 March, hundreds of university students protested in Afghanistan's eastern city of Jalalabad, shouting "Death to America – Death to Obama" and burning effigies of the U.S. president and a Christian cross. On 15 March about 2,000 people took part in another protest, in the southern province of Zabul. After the U.S. withdrawal in 2021, some Afghans said this and other massacres increased support for the Taliban. Haji Muhammad Wazir, whose family was massacred by Bales, said he gave the Taliban financial and other support as a result.

=== Reaction from Afghan authorities ===
The President of Afghanistan, Hamid Karzai, called the incident "intentional murder" and stated, "this [was] an assassination, an intentional killing of innocent civilians and cannot be forgiven." He said the United States must now pull back its troops from village areas and allow Afghan security forces to take the lead to reduce civilian deaths. On 16 March, Karzai said the U.S. was not fully cooperating with a probe into the killings. He also said the problem of civilian casualties at the hands of NATO forces "has been going on for too long ... It is by all means the end of the rope here". A spokesperson for the Afghan Interior Ministry condemned the act "in the strongest possible terms."

Afghan politicians wanted Bales to face an Afghan court. The National Assembly of Afghanistan insisted that the U.S. soldier be put on public trial in Afghanistan: "We seriously demand and expect that the government of the United States punish the culprits and try them in a public trial before the people of Afghanistan." It also condemned the killings as "brutal and inhuman" and declared that "people are running out of patience over the ignorance of foreign forces." Abdul Rahim Ayobi, a member of parliament from Kandahar, said the shooting "gives us the message that now the American soldiers are out of the control of their generals." Kamal Safai, a member from Kunduz, said that while it was the act of a single man, "the public reaction will blame the government of America, not the soldier."

=== Reaction from U.S. and NATO ===
American and ISAF forces apologized and promised a full investigation, with Secretary of Defense Leon Panetta stating that the soldier "will be brought to justice and be held accountable" and that the death penalty "could be a consideration." U.S. president Barack Obama called the incident "absolutely tragic and heartbreaking" but noted that he was "proud generally" of what U.S. troops have accomplished in Afghanistan. Obama said the incident did not represent the "exceptional character" of the American military and the respect that the United States had for the people of Afghanistan. On 13 March, he said, "the United States takes this as seriously as if it were our own citizens and our own children who were murdered. We're heartbroken over the loss of innocent life. The killing of innocent civilians is outrageous and it's unacceptable." In response to a reporter asking whether the killings could be likened to the 1968 My Lai massacre of civilians by U.S. forces in South Vietnam, Obama replied, "It's not comparable. It appeared you had a lone gunman who acted on his own."

General John R. Allen, commander of the ISAF, issued an apology as well. Adrian Bradshaw, the deputy commander of the NATO forces in Afghanistan, apologized "I wish to convey my profound regrets and dismay... I cannot explain the motivation behind such callous acts, but they were in no way part of authorized ISAF military activity." A "rapid and thorough" inquiry was promised. U.S. officials said the killings would not affect their strategies in the area.

=== Response from the Taliban ===
The Taliban said in a statement on its website that "sick-minded American savages committed the blood-soaked and inhumane crime." The insurgent group promised the families of the victims that it would take revenge "for every single martyr". The Taliban also accused Afghan security officials of being complicit in the attack. The insurgent group called off peace talks in the wake of the deadly rampage. On 13 March, the Taliban launched an attack on an Afghan government delegation visiting the site of the killings, killing one government soldier and injuring three.

== See also ==
- Khosrow Sofla (Afghanistan, 2010)
- Maywand District murders (Afghanistan, 2010)
- List of massacres in Afghanistan
- List of rampage killers (religious, political, or ethnic crimes)
- War in Afghanistan (2001–2021)
