= Alkozai =

Settlement in Afghanistan

Coordinates: 31°31′N 65°30′E

- Village
- Interactive map of Alkozai
- Country: Afghanistan
- Province: Kandahar
- District: Panjwayi

Alkozai (Pashto: الکوزی) (also spelled Alokozai) is a village in Panjwayi District, Kandahar Province, Afghanistan.

It was the site of the 2012 Kandahar massacre.
