= Najeeban =

Village in Kandahar Province, Afghanistan

- Village
- Country: Afghanistan
- Province: Kandahar
- District: Panjwayi

Najeeban (Pashto: نجیبان) (also spelled Najib Yan نجیب یان) is a village in Panjwayi District, Kandahar Province, Afghanistan.

== Kandahar massacre ==
In Najeeban, a disguised American army staff sergeant walked inside the village and killed eleven members of the same family and one man in another house nearby as part of the Kandahar massacre. The twelve bodies were partially burned.

== See also ==
- Kandahar Province
