= Solidarity Party of Afghanistan =

Solidarity Party of Afghanistan حزب همبستگی افغانستان
- Leader: Dawood Razmak
- Founded: 17 April 2004
- Membership: 30,000 (approx.)
- Ideology: Democratic socialism Secularism; Anti-imperialism; Feminism; Progressivism
- Political position: Left-wing
- International affiliation: Progressive International

Website
- hambastagi.org

The Solidarity Party of Afghanistan (Dari: حزب همبستگی افغانستان; Hezb-e Hambastagi-ye Afghanistan; abbr. SPA) is a minor left-wing political party in Afghanistan. The party platform focuses on four main issues: democratic socialism, secularism, women's rights, social democracy, and opposition to NATO's Resolute Support Mission in Afghanistan. The party is strongly critical of the Afghan government, which it views as corrupt, fundamentalist, and dominated by warlords. The party claims a membership of some 30,000.

== History ==
The party boycotted the 2005 and 2010 parliamentary elections.

The party was suspended in June 2012 following a Kabul demonstration in late April 2012 where the party accused a number of Afghan leaders, including former leaders and commanders, of committing war crimes over the last three decades of conflict, and demanded they be brought to justice.

The SPA boycotted the 2004, 2009, and 2014 Afghan Presidential elections as the party alleges that an individual cannot be elected without the approval of the US government. The party does, however, take part in provincial elections as it believes these elections to be more democratic and harder for central government to control or rig. No SPA members ran in the 2013 provincial elections, although the party did support certain candidates. The party condemned the 2019 Turkish offensive into north-eastern Syria.

According to photographic evidence from 24 March 2024, the Solidarity Party of Afghanistan were involved in the creation of a monument for the Murder of Farkhunda Malikzada in Kabul, where she was lynched.

== See also ==
- List of political parties in Afghanistan
- Revolutionary Association of the Women of Afghanistan
