= Zherai District =

District in Kandahar Province, Afghanistan

Zheray ژړۍ
- District
- Location within Afghanistan
- Coordinates: 31°34′33″N 65°25′36″E
- Country: Afghanistan
- Province: Kandahar
- District Center: Pasab

Population (2025)
  - Total: 105,701
- Time zone: UTC+04:30 (Afghanistan Time)

Zheray, also written as Zherai, Zheri or Zhari (Pashto: ژړۍ), is one of the districts of Kandahar Province in southern Afghanistan. It has an estimated population of 105,701 people. The village of Pasab serves as its center.

Zheray district was created in 2004 from parts of Maywand and Panjwayi districts. The Kandahar–Herat Highway runs in the district. Panjwayi Bazaar is the closest town to Zherai and Kandahar the closest city.

== Geography ==
Zheray lies on the north bank of the Arghandab River, which runs east to west through Kandahar Province. The general area is sometimes referred to as the Arghandab Valley. The built-up and farmed area of Zheray is approximately 30 km (19 mi) east to west by 8 km (5.0 mi) north to south, between the river and the Kandahar–Herat Highway.

Most buildings are single-story mud structures, with narrow, winding roads and walkways. The exceptions are the grape-drying huts, which are larger buildings, as high as 20 m (66 ft), scattered throughout the countryside. The farmlands are irrigated by a complex system of wadis running parallel with the Arghandab River. The area north of Highway 1 is more desert-like with abrupt mountain ranges of approximately 200–400m in height.

== History ==
The district was created 2004 from land that was formerly part of Maywand and Panjwai districts. It was done by then-President Hamid Karzai as a reward for Habibullah Jan, an ethnic Alizai warlord, who had helped defeat the Taliban in the early part of the 2000s.

NATO and ISAF has been supporting the Karzai government and quell an insurgency. The Taliban is deeply rooted in Zheray's history and has long been attempting to exert influence through a system of mullahs and elders (see Resurgence of Taliban). The situation was complicated by the warlords and criminals who also attempted to minimize the government's power in the area to further their own ends.

A 2 AM raid on 18 October 2006 by NATO helicopters, hunting Taliban fighters, was only half a mile from the scene of September's 2006 Operation Medusa, one of the most ferocious battles between Western forces and insurgents since late 2001.

On 4 October 2013, 4 U.S. special operations soldiers were killed and 12 wounded during an operation in the Zheray district. The coalition soldiers were killed by a set of IEDs and a suicide bomber. A Taliban spokesman claimed explosives were placed in a house and detonated when soldiers entered. As other soldiers entered to assist the fallen, a suicide bomber detonated his explosives.

== Politics ==
The Shurah has been the basic mechanism of government in Zheray. The tribal nature of the district is inseparable from politics, making the decision-making process difficult and time-consuming.

The Zheray seat of government for the district is located in Pasab. The district center is also adjacent to Forward Operating Base Pasab (FOB Pasab), a former ISAF base now controlled by the Afghan National Security Forces.

Jamal Agha was the district governor in 2015. Muhammed Naez Sarhadi and Karim Jan were previous district governors. Mohammad Masoum Khan leads the Afghan National Police forces in the district as of 26 January 2015.

== Economy ==
Most residents of Zheray are villagers involved in agriculture, trade and transport. The major crops of the area have always been grapes.

== Tribes ==
Most people in Zheray are Pashtuns. There are at least a dozen tribes, the most numerous of which are the Alizai, Achakzai, Nurzai and Ghilzai. Many nomadic tribes pass through the northern areas of Zheray between Maywand and Arghandab districts.

== Sub-districts ==
The political geography of Zheray changes over time. Many of the smaller villages bear the name of the local elder. A collection of these smaller villages can be loosely described as a sub-district. Zheray currently has the following sub-districts:

- Nar Kariz
- Nalgham
- Sangsar
- Kolk
- Gariban
- Siah Choy
- Sablaghay
- Pashmul
- Asequeh
- Sanzari

== See also ==
- Districts of Afghanistan
- Khosrow Sofla
- Tarok Kolache
