= Kimberley Motley =

American human rights and civil rights attorney

- Education: University of Wisconsin-Milwaukee (BS, MS); Marquette University (JD)
- Occupations: International attorney, author
- Notable work: Lawless: A lawyer’s unrelenting fight for justice in a war zone

Kimberley Chongyon Motley is an American international human rights and civil rights lawyer. Motley was the first foreign attorney who litigated cases in Afghanistan.

== Early life and education ==
Motley's father was African-American and her mother was from rural North Korea. She is a former Mrs. Wisconsin and grew up in a “hard” Milwaukee neighborhood filled with poverty and crime. Her parents met when her father was in the military and her mother immigrated to the U.S. She became interested in law after a teacher assigned Law & Order for class and after witnessing her father's legal fight for disability after being laid off after a car accident.

Motley received an Associate of Arts and Sciences (A.A.S.) degree from Milwaukee Area Technical College in 1997. She received a B.A. degree from the University of Wisconsin–Milwaukee in 2000, and in 2003 received an M.A. from the same institution. In the same year, she earned a J.D. from Marquette University Law School.

== Career ==
In 2004, Motley was crowned Mrs. Wisconsin.

In 2008, after working as a public defender in Milwaukee for five years, Motley went to Afghanistan as part of a nine-month legal education program run by the U.S. State Department to train Afghan lawyers. She had never traveled outside the U.S. before. "In that nine months," she later recalled in a 2014 TED talk, "I went around the country and I talked to hundreds of people that were locked up, and I talked to many businesses that were also operating in Afghanistan. And within these conversations, I started hearing the connections between the businesses and the people, and how laws that were meant to protect them were being underused, while gross and illegal punitive measures were overused. And so this put me on a quest for justness, and what justness means to me is using laws for their intended purpose, which is to protect. The role of laws is to protect. So as a result, I decided to open up a private practice, and I became the first foreigner to litigate in Afghan courts." Motley has successfully represented numerous Afghan women pro bono in Afghanistan whose human rights were violated.

At first she represented Westerners in Afghan prisons without legal representation. "What I found," she later recalled, "is that most did not have proper legal representation. If they were English-speaking, they had no idea what was going on in court. I felt and still feel a great responsibility for them as a person and as a lawyer."

Motley's first defendant was an African woman convicted of drug trafficking. She was a drug mule sent to Afghanistan by a European pimp imprisoned for two years with her 3-year-old daughter. She was convicted and sentenced to 14 years in prison, and had gone through almost all of her legal options. Eventually, Motley was able to secure a presidential decree ordering the woman's release.

Since 2009, Motley has been the CEO of Motley Legal Services, which provides legal representation in the U.S., Afghanistan, and other countries She spends approximately nine months a year in Afghanistan, where she provides pro bono representation particularly for Afghan women on human-rights cases and persons charged with criminal offenses in Afghanistan. Motley has worked in mentoring attorneys and on rule of law internationally. She worked in Badam Bagh women's prison in Afghanistan giving pro bono legal advice. She is registered as an attorney with the American, French, U.A.E., Australian, Spanish, Dutch, British, Italian, Norwegian, German, and Canadian Embassies in Afghanistan, and is thus routinely contacted by expatriates who are facing legal troubles with Afghan authorities.

The Daily Beast stated in 2010, "and often her work starts after the verdict—as in the case of an Australian on death row, convicted of killing an Afghan colleague in self-defense; a South African sentenced to fifteen years in prison on drug charges, and a Brit convicted of fraud." For example, "she successfully won a not guilty verdict for the release of Bill Shaw, a former British military officer, who had been held in the notorious Pul-e-Charkhi prison for five months.

Motley studied Sharia, and "developed her own approach to operating in the Afghan courts," reported The Daily Beast. For example, "she never wears a veil or a dress" during a trial. She explained, "I need to look like a man as much as possible...I find that men hear me more when I don't wear a headscarf. I wore it at first, and when I took it off, I found men were more respectful."

As of 2010, Motley was under a threat from the Afghan District Attorney's office to arrest her next time she set foot in Kabul, as retribution for her harsh criticism of Afghanistan's corrupt judicial system. She had no hesitation about returning. She also noted that she received death threats and rape threats. She has also "been temporarily detained" and "accused of running a brothel" and of espionage. A grenade was thrown at her office. But she has said that the rewards of her job "far outweigh the risks, and as many risks as I take, my clients take far greater risks, because they have a lot more to lose if their cases go unheard, or worse, if they're penalized for having me as their lawyer. With every case that I take, I realize that as much as I'm standing behind my clients, that they're also standing behind me, and that's what keeps me going."

On June 21, 2014, Motley's husband, Claudiare Motley, was shot in Milwaukee after attending a high school reunion due to an attempted carjacking committed by Nathan King, a sixteen year old. Eventually King was shot while attempting another robbery and became paralyzed as a result. Motley represented Claudiare and Victoria Davison, the woman who shot King, in court. On July 16, 2015, King was found guilty of the two counts of Attempted Armed Robbery against Motley and Davison and ultimately was sentenced to twelve years of initial confinement in prison to be followed by eight years of extended supervision.. A documentary about Motley's husband shooting entitled, When Claude Got Shot, won an Exceptional Merit in Documentary Filmmaking Emmy in 2022.

On December 16, 2016, Motley went to Havana, Cuba to represent activist and artist Danilo Machado. While in Havana, Motley was arrested without charge and subsequently deported from Cuba. On January 21, 2017, Machado was released from El Combinado del Este prison without charge.

In June 2021 Motley helped a decorated Afghan Air Force pilot Naiem Asadi and his family leave Afghanistan. The Taliban posted pictures of Major Asadi online with the instructions to, "Find him and kill him." Motley helped the family obtain humanitarian parole visas to the U.S. In 2021, Motley was accused of by an Afghan couple for allegedly assisting US Marine Joshua Mast in the alleged abduction of an Afghan child, Motley has vehemently denied the claims and is suing for defamation.

On July 28, 2021, Wisconsin Judge Glenn Yamahiro found probable cause to charge Officer Joseph Mensah for the shooting and killing of Jay Anderson Jr. on June 23, 2016. The Anderson family is said to have used an obscure John Doe law option. Joseph Mensah is an officer who killed three males of color in less than five years time and the department found significant training issues.

A documentary about Motley's husband shooting entitled, When Claude Got Shot, won an Exceptional Merit in Documentary Filmmaking Emmy in September 2022.

On May 8, 2023, Motley represented dozens of protestors in federal court alleged to have been targeted by police in the creation of a target list for their part in the 2020 George Floyd protests.

=== Clients ===
Motley's clients have included:

- Fatou - Kuwait moves on Instagram Slave Traders After BBC Investigation
- Eritrean Soccer Players who Defected Said They Live in Fear
- Ablikim Yusuf - Activist Scramble to Prevent Uighur Man's Deportation to China
- Danilo Maldonado Machado a.k.a. El Sexto - Human Rights Attorney Representing El Sexto Arrested in Havana
- Niloofar Rhamani - Meet Afghanistan's First Female Fixed Wing Pilot
- Anwar Ibrahim - U.S. Lawyer takes on Anwar Ibrahim's Sodomy II Case
- Australian Child Abduction - Children Abducted to Afghanistan Returned to their Mother
- British Child Abduction - Snatched Boys Found in Afghanistan Reunited with Mother
- Bevan Campbell - Former Beauty Queen on Lawyering in Afghanistan (Bevan Campbell Freed)
- Victoria Davidson - Two Crime Victims One a CCW Holder who Shot Boy in Court for Sixteen Year Old's Sentencing
- Farkhunda - (Motley Represented Farkhunda's family only in First Court in which there were 23 convictions) Hardly Justice for Farkhunda
- David Gordon - U.S. Contractor Illegally Detained in Afghanistan
- Sahar Gul - Afghanistan's Hunted Women Update
- Gulnaz - Afghan Rape Victim Freed From Jail
- Michael Hearn - British Private Security Company Employee Jailed by Afghans Amid Crackdown (freed from jail)
- Khatera - Afghan Sues Police Over Daughter's Murder
- Robert Langdon - Freed Aussie's Debt to U.S. Lawyer
- Anthony Malone - Ex-para Anthony Malone Freed from Afghan Jail
- Naghma (Child Bride) - Brokering A Deal to Save a Child Bride
- Mariam Rocabado - A World Class Lawyer Deals with a Case of Rape in Bolivia
- Matthew Rosenberg / New York Times - New President Welcomes Back Times Reporter
- William Shaw - Former British Army Officer Acquitted of Bribery Charge
- Baljit Singh - Afghan Man, Detained for Being Sikh is Released from Prison
- Charlie Tate - Two Men Sentenced in Unrelated Deaths
- Philip Young - Philip Young to be Released
- British Contractors - Britons Freed in Afghanistan After Weapons Arrest
- Eight-Year-Old Boy Must Stay in Supervised Care

== Motley's Law (documentary film) ==
A documentary film entitled Motley's Law about Motley made by the Danish film production company Made in Copenhagen and directed by Nicole Nielsen Horanyi and produced by Helle Faber was released in October 2015. It won the Grand Jury Prize Award at NYC DOC 2015.

It also won the AWFJ - Alliance of Women Film Journalists' EDA Award for Best Female-Directed Documentary at IDFA 2015. Motley's Law was nominated for the FACT Award at CPH-DOX.

== Publications ==
=== Books and reports ===
- Lawless: A lawyer's unrelenting fight for justice in a war zone (Allen & Unwin, 2019), hardback ISBN 978-1760633172; paperback Lawless: A Lawyer's Unrelenting Fight for Justice in One of the World's Most Dangerous Places ISBN 978-1760633035

“Juvenile Justice Sentencing Guidelines for Afghanistan,” Italian Cooperation, 2nd Edition, May 2017.

“Juvenile Justice Sentencing Guidelines for Afghanistan,” Italian Cooperation, 1st Edition, May 2013.

“Assessment of Juvenile Justice in Afghanistan”, Terre des Hommes, 2010.

=== Articles ===
- "Failing Farkhunda Means Failing Afghan Women"
- "The Mob Killing of Farkhunda was a Defining Moment for Women's Rights in Afghanistan"
- "A Defining Moment"
- "Our Complacency with War Torn Violence"
- "The Immorality of Afghanistan's Moral Crimes"
- "Article 26: The implications for Afghanistani women and children," published by Chambers and Partners, Chambers Women & Diversity in February 2014.
- "Making Good on the 911 Legacy for Afghan Women"
- "Juvenile Injustice in Afghanistan"
- "Assessment of Juvenile Justice in Afghanistan"
