= Singesar =

Village in Kandahar Province, Afghanistan

- Location within Afghanistan
- Coordinates: 31.5538753°N 65.3182954°E
- Country: Afghanistan
- Province: Kandahar Province

Population
  - Total: 2,400

Singesar, also spelt Sangesar and Sangsar (Pashto: سنگيسار) is a Pashtun village 25 miles (40 km) west of Kandahar, Afghanistan, in the Zheray district.

== About ==
The village's name originates from the phrase sang-e-hisar, or stone fort, after an old fort in the area constructed by the British in the 19th century.

It was the former home of Taliban leader Mullah Omar, who lived there between the end of the anti-Soviet jihad in 1989 and the launch of the Taliban movement in 1994. He worked there as a preacher and religious instructor.

== Notable people ==
- Abdul Ali Deobandi, pro-Taliban cleric
