= Shah-Do Shamshira Mosque =

Mosque in Kabul, Afghanistan

- شاه دوشمشېره جومات مسجد شاه دوشمشیره
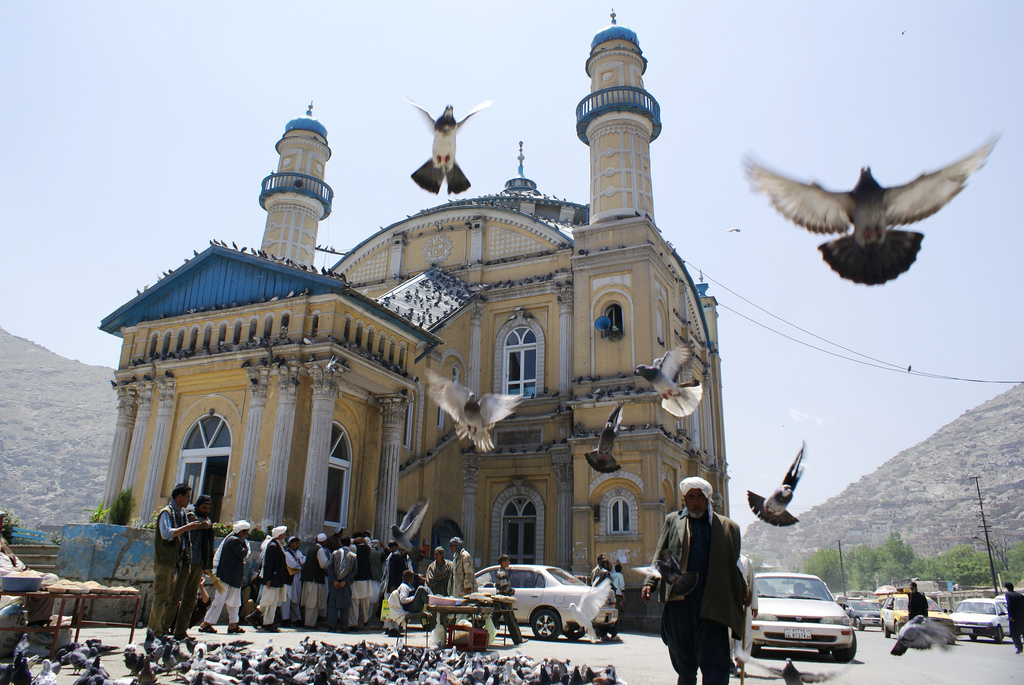
- The mosque in 2013

- Location of the mosque in Afghanistan

Religion
- Affiliation: Islam
- Ecclesiastical or organisational status: Mosque
- Status: Active

Location
- Location: Kabul, Kabul Province
- Country: Afghanistan
- Coordinates: 34°30′56″N 69°10′17″E

Architecture
- Type: Mosque
- Style: Afghan Baroque
- Completed: c. 1920s CE

Specifications
- Minaret: Two
- Materials: Stucco

The Shah-Do Shamshira Mosque (Note: Pashto: شاه دوشمشېره جومات Dari: مسجد شاه دوشمشیره) (lit. 'Mosque of the King of Two Swords'), is a yellow two-story mosque in Kabul, Afghanistan. The mosque is situated in District 2, on Andarabi Road, just off the Kabul River and the Shah-Do Shamshira bridge in the center of the city. It was built during the reign of Amanullah Khan (1919–1929).

The mosque was modelled after the Ortaköy Mosque in Istanbul, Turkey. The design of the mosque is quite unusual for Islamic religious architecture and its Italian decorative stucco creates an interesting effect that some describe as ‘Afghan Baroque’.

== Overview ==
The mosque in 1928

The mosque is located next to the tomb of a Mughal general, Chin Timur Khan, who was also the cousin of the central Asian conqueror Babur. Chin Timur helped conquer much of South Asia and is famous for the Battle of Khanwa, in which he took a leading role. Not far from here are the tombs of Babur and many other prominent Mughal commanders who invaded South Asia from Afghanistan and established Mughal rule over large parts of South Asia (including modern-day India, Pakistan and Bangladesh).

The shrine was the site of the murder of Farkhunda Malikzada on 19 March 2015.

In June 2021, the mosque was fully renovated.

In May 2024, the Afghanistan Freedom Front (AFF) insurgency group claimed to have assassinated Taliban leader Mullah Hibatullah Akhundzada while he was visiting the mosque during a trip he made to Kabul, killing three of his special security guards and injuring another.

== See also ==
- Islam in Afghanistan
- List of mosques in Afghanistan
