= Panjwayi District =

District of Kandahar Province, southeastern Afghanistan

Panjwayi پنجوايي
- District
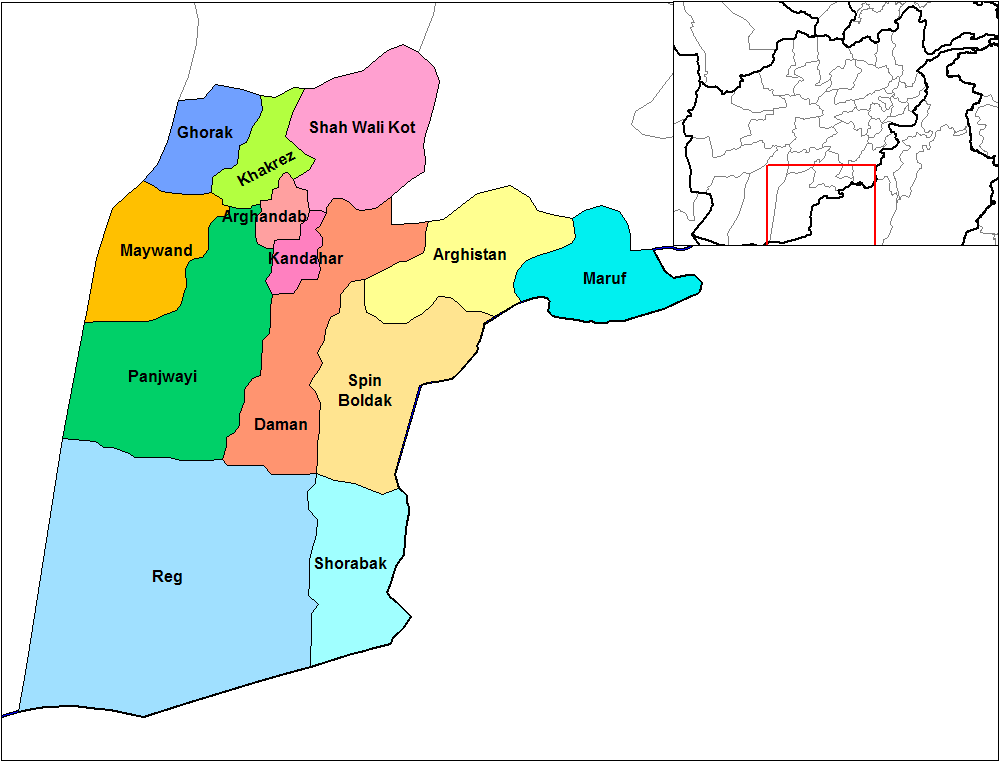
- Districts of Kandahar Province up to 2004, with Panjwai in dark green

- Location within Afghanistan
- Country: Afghanistan
- Province: Kandahar
- District Center: Panjwayi Bazaar

Population (2025)
  - Total: 107,294
- Time zone: UTC+04:30 (Afghanistan Time)

Panjwayi (Pashto: پنجوايي) is one of the districts of Kandahar Province, in southern Afghanistan. It has an estimated population of 107,294 people. Panjwayi Bazaar serves as the district center, which is located about 35 km (22 mi) west of Kandahar.

Panjwayi borders Helmand Province to the southwest, Maywand District to the west, Zhari District to the north, Arghandab, Kandahar and Daman districts to the east and Reg District to the south. Panjwayi was reduced in size in 2004 when Zhari District was created out of the northern part of it, on the northern side of the Arghandab River, which now forms the northern boundary. The area is irrigated by the Helmand and Arghandab Valley Authority.

== War in Afghanistan ==
Panjwayi was the site of continual fighting and emplacements of improvised explosive devices (IED) during the War in Afghanistan, with the bulk of the Canadian Forces' casualties taken from this district. It was the scene of the Battle of Panjwayi involving Canadian Forces and Taliban fighters and the theatre of the ISAF Operation Medusa, September 2006. NATO claimed to have killed over 500 Taliban insurgents.

The 2009 increase in ISAF forces, brought on about by the U.S. surge, increased troop densities in Panjwayi, resulting in a greater ability on behalf of Afghan government and international forces to conduct operations and penetrate into former Taliban strongholds, especially villages in the "Horn of Panjwayi" such as Mushan, Nejat, Talokan, Sperwan Ghar and Zangabad. These villages are considered the "Birthplace of the Taliban" and were seen as one of the most dangerous regions of Afghanistan for NATO forces. On 16 November 2009 Canadian troops captured the Taliban-controlled village of Hajji Baba southwest of Kandahar City.

The Kandahar massacre occurred at around 3:00 AM on Sunday, March 11, 2012, when 38-year-old U.S. Army staff sergeant Robert Bales from Joint Base Lewis-McChord (in Washington), went from house to house in two separate villages in the district (Balandi and Alokzai) and killed 16 Afghan civilians, including 9 children.

The Taliban maintained a significant psychological and physical presence in the district, and recaptured it on 10 July 2021, during the 2021 Taliban offensive.

== Populated places ==
Headquarters of the Afghan National Police in Panjwayi

- Alkozai
- Balandi
- Bazar-i-Panjwayi
- Najeeban
- Zangabad

== See also ==
- Districts of Afghanistan
