= Maiwand District =

Maiwand
- District
- Location within Afghanistan
- Coordinates: 31°44′22″N 65°08′24″E
- Country: Afghanistan
- Province: Kandahar Province
- District Center: Hutal

Government
  - District Governor: Salih Mohammad Noorzai

Population (2006)
  - Total: 51,900
- Time zone: UTC+4:30

Maiwand District (Pashto: د میوند ولسوالۍ) is situated in the western part of the Kandahar Province, Afghanistan. It borders Helmand Province to the west, Ghorak District to the north, Khakrez District to the northeast, Zhari District to the east, and Panjwayi District to the south. The population is 51,900 (2006). The district center is in Hutal, located in the central part of the district. Highway 1 runs through the center of the district and connects two of the major cities in southern Afghanistan, Kandahar and Lashkargah.

== Battle of Maiwand ==
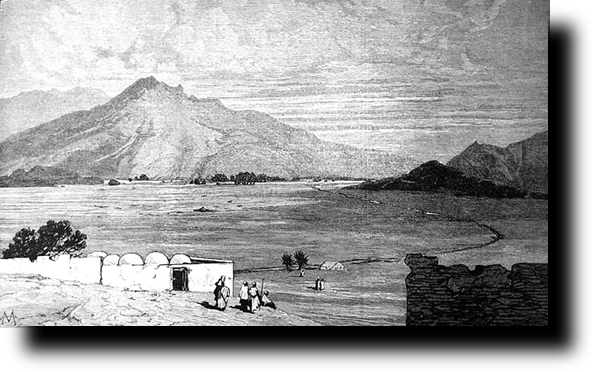
A depiction of Maiwand during the 1878 British operations

The Battle of Maiwand was fought at the village of Maiwand on 27 July 1880, during the Second Anglo-Afghan War. To this day a small fort remains from the British presence.

== Operation Enduring Freedom ==
One casualty was Paula Loyd, a member of a Human Terrain System team, who was doused with a flammable liquid and set afire on November 4, 2008, and later died at Brooke Army Medical Center on January 7, 2009.

== See also ==
- Maywand District murders
