= Panjwayi Bazaar =

Settlement in Kandahar, Afghanistan

Panjwai Bazaar
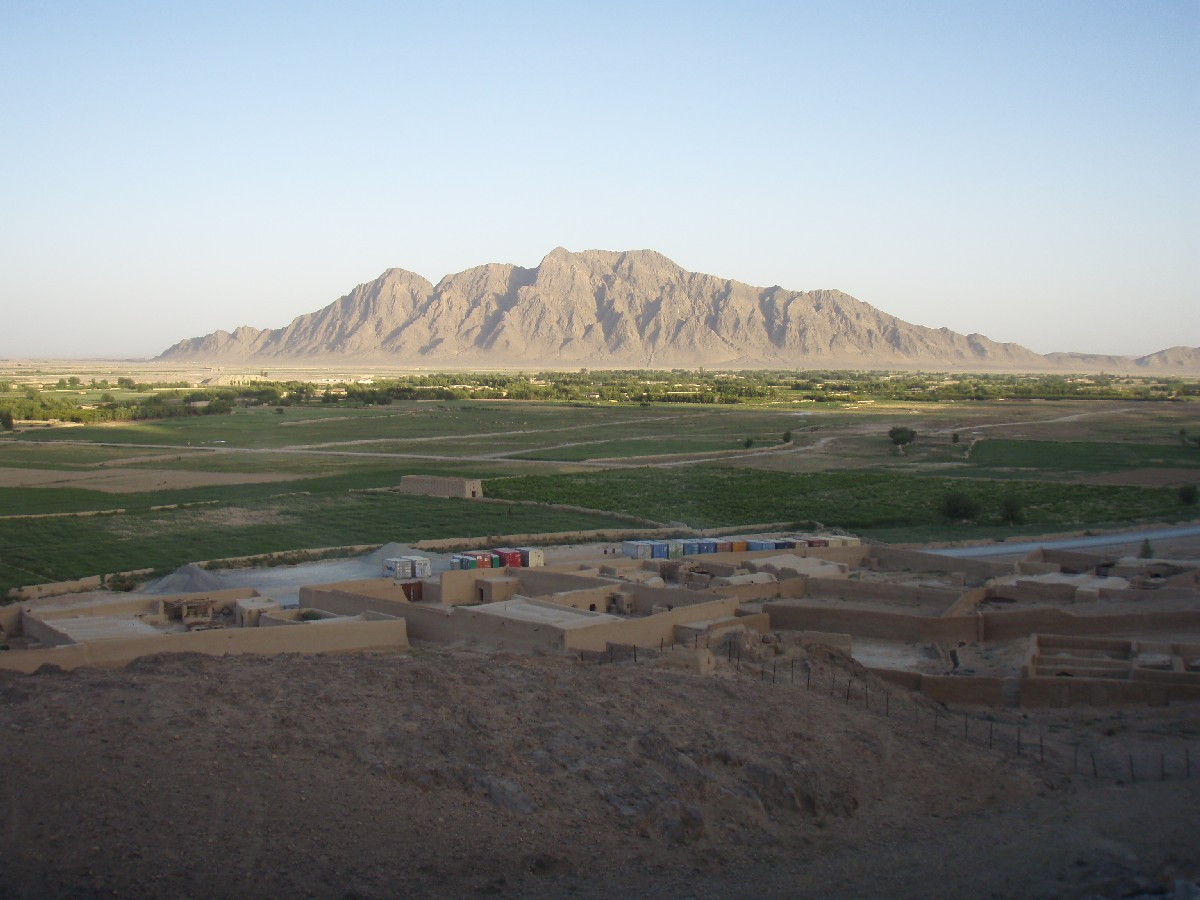
- Sunset over the valley

- Location in Afghanistan
- Coordinates: 31°32′52″N 65°27′15″E
- Country: Afghanistan
- Province: Kandahar Province
- District: Panjwayi District
- Elevation: 3,120 ft (950 m)
- Time zone: UTC+04:30 (Afghanistan Time)

Panjwayi Bazaar (Pashto: د پنجوایي بازار) is a village and the center of Panjwayi District in Kandahar Province, Afghanistan. It is located on 31.5478°N 65.4542°E at 950 m altitude. The population is about 5000. It is situated just south of the Arghandab River.

== See also ==
- Kandahar Province
