= Balandi =

Village in Kandahar Province (Afghanistan)

- Village
- Country: Afghanistan
- Province: Kandahar
- District: Panjwayi

Balandi (Pashto: بالانډی) is a village in Panjwayi District, Kandahar Province, Afghanistan.

It was also the site of the 2012 Kandahar massacre.

== See also ==
- Kandahar Province
