= 2012 Afghanistan Quran burning protests =

Protest

Coordinates: 34°56′46″N 69°15′54″E

- Part of War in Afghanistan (2001–2021)
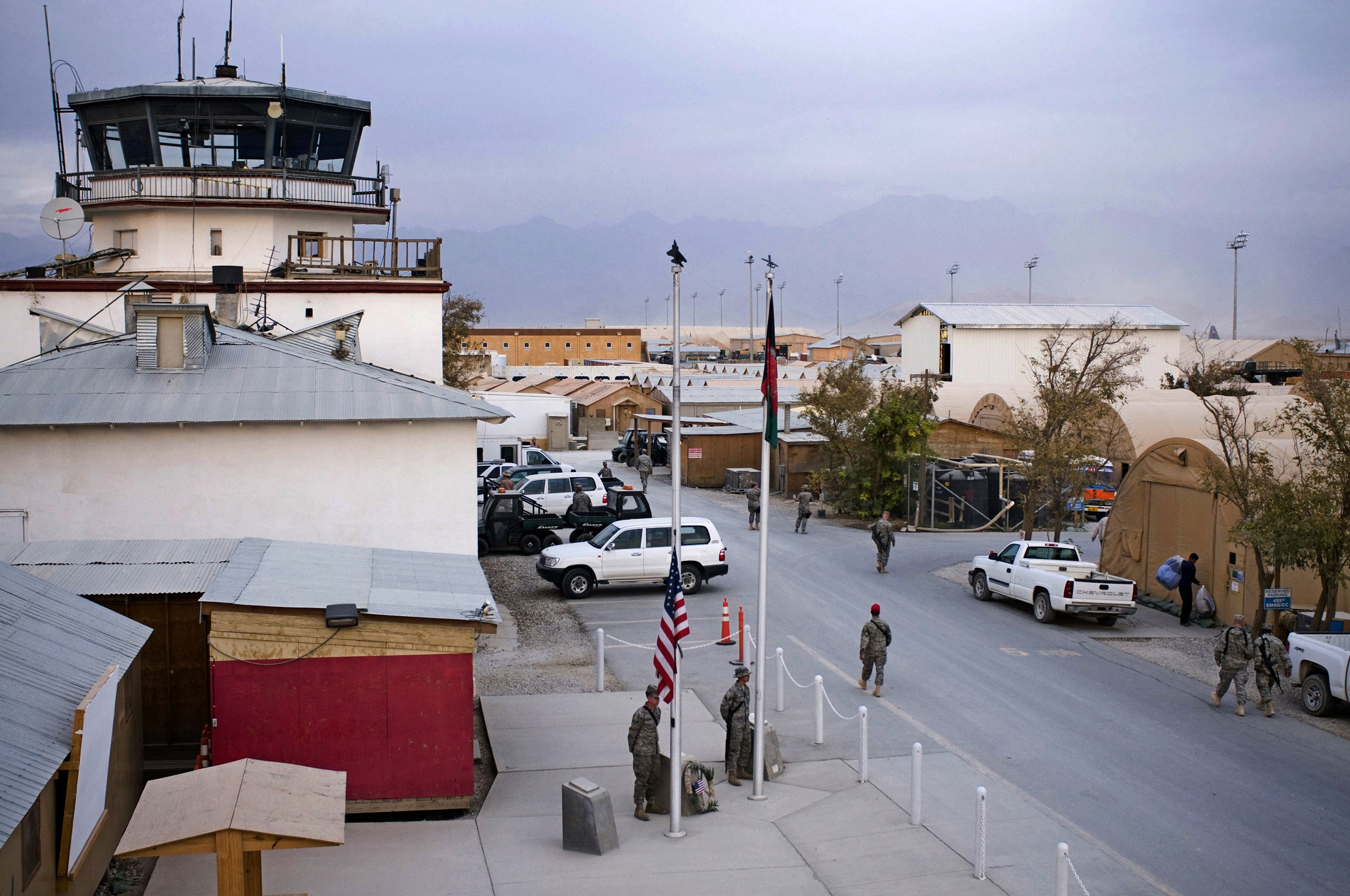
- Bagram Airfield, where the Quran burnings took place, in 2008.
- Date: 22 February 2012 – 27 February 2012
- Location: Afghanistan
- Caused by: Quran desecration
- Methods: Demonstrations, riots and assassinations

Parties
(Islamic Republic of Afghanistan) Afghan protesters	(Islamic Republic of Afghanistan) Government of Afghanistan; Afghan National Police; Afghan National Army

Casualties and losses
- Deaths: 41; Injuries: At least 270

The 2012 Afghanistan Quran burning protests were a series of protests of varying levels of violence which took place early in 2012 in response to the burning of Islamic religious material by soldiers from the United States Bagram Air Base in Afghanistan. On 22 February 2012, U.S. troops at Bagram Base disposed of copies of the Quran that had been used by Taliban prisoners to write messages to each other. As part of the disposal, parts of the books were burned. Afghan forces working at the base reported this, resulting in outraged Afghans besieging Bagram AFB, raining it with molotov cocktails and stones. After five days of protest, 30 people had been killed, including four Americans. Over 200 people were wounded. International condemnation followed the burning of copies of the Quran, on 22 February 2012, from the library that is used by inmates at the base's detention facility. The protests included domestic riots which caused at least 41 deaths and at least 270 injuries.

== Background ==
Bagram Airfield was one of the largest American military bases in Afghanistan, about 40 kilometres (25 mi) northeast of the Afghan capital Kabul. The Parwan Detention Facility, located at the base, housed hundreds of Taliban, al Qaeda and other captured militants.

In February 2012, two Afghan-American interpreters at the base removed 1,652 damaged books and Islamic texts from the library at the Parwan Detention Facility (including 48 copies of the Quran), and boxed them for storage. On 22 February, several members of the United States armed forces sent them to an incinerator to be burned. Several Afghan garbage collectors working at the base reported finding a number of charred books and quickly notified an Afghan National Army commander.

John R. Allen, commander of ISAF and US forces in Afghanistan, said the books were taken from the library that is used by inmates at the detention facility. He said the religious material was removed from the library due to the presence of "extremist inscriptions" on them, further noting "an appearance that these documents were being used to facilitate extremist communications."

== Protests and violence ==
Some Muslims responded by participating in nationwide protests. Protesters expressed anti-American sentiments, and also dissatisfaction with the Afghanistan president, with the media reporting chants such as "Death to America, death to Obama, death to Karzai." Despite apologies from US President Barack Obama and US-ISAF commander John R. Allen, demonstrators attacked French, Norwegian and US bases, including those at Mihtarlam and Kapisa. A post on CBS News read:

Most of the rioting against the United States, however, has taken place not in the Pashtun areas where the Taliban have influence, but in Kabul, the capital, a Tajik city in the north ... Most of the anger against U.S. comes from Tajiks: The second largest ethnic group in Afghanistan, our allies who headed the Northern Alliance. Why are they burning the American flag? Why do they, when their dogs lose in their dog fights, call them Americans? ... The Ministry of the Interior, in Kabul, is controlled by Tajiks of the Northern Alliance. The two U.S. officers who died last week were probably murdered by a former ally.

— Jere Van Dyk, CBS News consultant

Twenty-three people were reported killed from the three days of protesting and riots, including four members of the United States armed forces, two of which resulted after someone in the uniform of the Afghan National Security Forces (ANSF) turned their weapons on them; over 55 others were also wounded. John Allen visited the base in Nangarhar and urged forces under his command not to seek retribution. On 25 February, the Taliban claimed responsibility for the deaths of four American military personnel. Two of the other dead were high-ranking US military advisors working inside the Afghan Interior Ministry in Kabul. The Taliban asserted that one of its operatives was assisted by someone to get into the ministry and to the Americans. Commander Allen called the shooting of the two senior US officers at the Ministry of Interior "cowardly".

Protests on 26 February in northern Kunduz Province left one protester dead, seven US military personnel injured by a grenade, and 16 other protesters injured in an attack on the police chief's office with grenades, pistols, knives, sticks, and stones. Rioters also tried to burn down the UN building. On the morning of 27 February a suicide car bomb attack at the entrance to Jalalabad Airport left nine people dead and 12 others wounded. The Taliban claimed responsibility for the attack as "revenge" for the desecrations of Quran. Afghans became aware that their feelings were being exploited by militant groups such as the Taliban and Gulbuddin Hekmatyar's Hezb-e Islami. Deutsche Welle reported:

Ahmad Jawed, a protester from Herat, said it was wrong to respond to the burning of the Koran with violence. 'Those who have used violence in the past days are harming the Afghan people. Unfortunately, some politically-motivated groups are exploiting the peaceful intentions.' 'We not only condemn the US for the burning of the Koran but also those who are committing crimes in the name of the Koran and its desecration,' he stated angrily. Yunus Fakoor, a political expert in Kabul, said radical religious groups were pouring oil on the fire for their own purposes. 'This is not a defense of faith. They are exploiting the religious feelings of people.'

== Investigation ==
A joint investigation by U.S. and Afghan authorities as well as a second investigation by the U.S. army into the incident concluded in early April 2012. According to a U.S. Army investigation report released on 27 August 2012, members of the Military Police and Theater Intelligence Team had discovered that Bagram detainees were using library books to pass notes and messages, and up to 100 Qurans and other religious materials were burned in the incinerator at Bagram Air Field on 20 February 2012.

Officers at the Parwan detention center on the edge of Bagram Air Base worried that some detainees were communicating through notes written in library books, potentially to plan an attack. As a precaution, the officers assigned two Afghan-American interpreters to sort through the library's books and identify those that might contain messages that could pose a security risk. By the time the interpreters were finished, nearly 2,000 volumes, including copies of the Quran and other religious texts, had been set aside for removal. According to the investigation, one interpreter reported that up to 75 percent of the books in the library contained extremist content. But high-ranking Afghan religious officials who conducted their own inquiry said at the time that they doubted the writing in the books was anything other than personal notations, and that some of it was simply notes of detainees' imprisonment, their names, their fathers' names and the locations and times of their arrest. Still, the books were deemed "sensitive material" by American military officials, who said they decided to burn them because there was no place to store them all. and so soldiers were ordered to remove the books as contraband.

In all, about 2,000 books, including Qurans and other religious material, were set to be destroyed. An Afghan National Army soldier and an interpreter warned the troops not to dispose of the religious texts, but soldiers took some 100 books to the burn pit anyway. As workers began heaving them into the flames, an Afghan laborer offered to help – and then started screaming when he realized what they were. He grabbed a front-end loader and doused the entire burn pit to extinguish the flames. The Afghan laborer also called for help from other workers, and they turned off the burner and began to douse the flames with water. The Americans immediately stopped, but by then at least four Qurans had been badly burned. An angry crowd of Afghans gathered around the U.S. service members who drove the truck to the burn pit and were burning the material. The three service members disposing of the books "became frightened by the growing, angry crowd and rapidly departed the area" in the truck, the investigation said.

"I absolutely reject any suggestion that those involved acted with any malicious intent to disrespect the Quran or defame the faith of Islam," an investigator, Brigadier General Bryan Watson, wrote. "Ultimately, this was a tragic incident (that) resulted from a lack of cross-talk between leaders and commanders, a lack of senior involvement in giving clear guidance in a complex operation" and "distrust among our service members and our partners." The investigators of the incident concluded that the involved soldiers did not follow proper procedures, were ignorant of the importance of the Quran to Afghans and got no clear guidance from their leaders in a chain of mistakes. Specifically, the report found that the service members relied too heavily on one linguist's conclusion that the Qurans, which also had militant messages in them, were rewritten versions that were extremist and would not be considered real Qurans. It also said the service members mistakenly interpreted a commander's order to get rid of the books as permission to take them to the burn pit. The report also found that only one of the service members assigned to transport the books to the burn pit knew they were carrying religious books. Even after commanders at the detention center realized a mistake was being made, the troops they dispatched to stop the burning went to the wrong location and didn't find the truck with the books.

== Punishment ==
No U.S. military persons, be it officers or enlisted personnel, had been disciplined as of 19 April 2012 for their roles in the incident according to The Atlantic magazine. As of 7 May 2012 it was not clear what actions the ISAF commander General John Allen took against the U.S. military personnel involved in the incident. His options included to take no action, to recommend criminal charges or to issue written reprimands. Six U.S. Army soldiers and one US sailor faced administrative punishments for their role in the incident; punishment could range from letters of reprimand to reductions in pay, but criminal charges were not recommended.

On 27 August 2012 the U.S. Army announced that six Army soldiers received administrative non-judicial punishments for their role in the inadvertent burning of Qurans in Afghanistan. The Army found no ill intent on the part of the soldiers, meaning they will not face criminal charges for the incident that set off deadly protests in Afghanistan in January.

The six soldiers being disciplined included four officers and two enlisted soldiers—a warrant officer is among the four officers. A Navy sailor was also investigated for his alleged role, but the admiral who reviewed his case determined he was not guilty and that no further disciplinary action was warranted. The investigation against the sailor was dropped when it was determined he was simply ordered to drive the truck with the material to the burn site at the base. The U.S. Army did not specify exactly how the soldiers had been punished, but generally non-judicial administrative punishments can include, among other things, a reprimand, reductions in rank, forfeiting pay, extra duties or being restricted to a military base. The punishments remain on a service member's permanent record and can prevent further promotion.

== Reactions ==
Domestic

- Afghanistan – Afghan President Hamid Karzai called for "dialogue and calm" in response to the Quran burnings and subsequent protests. Aimal Faizi, Karzai's spokesperson, spoke of the incidents at Bagram that: "The sooner you turn over the Bagram prison to Afghan authorities the sooner we will avoid such incidents".
  - Defense Minister Abdul Rahim Wardak called his US counterpart Leon Panetta to apologise for what he called the "wrongful deaths" of the US personnel and offered his condolences to their families.
  - Minister of the Interior Bismillah Khan Mohammadi also offered his condolences and apologies to the families of the US victims.
  - Aziz Raf'ie from the Afghanistan Civil Society said "The political consequences are much worse than the crime itself."
  - Sher Mohammad Karimi, the Chief of Army Staff of the Afghan National Army, spoke at the ISAF army base where two US soldiers were killed in which he applauded ISAF soldiers, thanking them for their "sacrifices for humanity, not just the Afghan people." Later, he said the Quran burning incident advanced the Taliban's cause and any repeat of similar "negligence" by Western forces would be disastrous; "The enemy (Taliban) will enlarge it and make use of it in such a way to instigate everybody," Karimi said in an interview.
  - Abdul Sattar Khawasi, a Hezbi Islami MP representing Parwan province, said that the "Americans are invaders and jihad against Americans is an obligation." He called on mullahs and religious leaders, along with about 20 other members of parliament, "to urge the people from the pulpit to wage jihad against Americans."
  - Dr. Mahmood Khan, an MP representing Kandahar province, said that "other countries" are sending people into his country to incite violence.
  - Ahmad Shah Ahmadzai, the chairman of the Afghanistan National Front political party, stated: "It's not for the first time that foreigners had desecrated the Quran... As long as foreign troops remain in Afghanistan, peace will elude the country." The party's spokesman explained that "the presence of foreign troops cannot bring peace to the country, but makes the situation even worse."
  - Davood Moradian, a former Karzai adviser and an assistant professor of political science at the American University of Afghanistan said that: "They are coming here and misusing the demonstrations for propaganda. You have small groups of people here who skillfully influence the Afghans and can mobilise protests with several thousand people... They are very good at tapping into emotions." Zubair Babakarkhail explains that: "Afghan officials have long blamed elements within Pakistan, where protests over the Quran burning had spread by Friday, for funding and directing the Taliban-led insurgency that has plagued Afghanistan for more than a decade."
- (Afghanistan) The Taliban – According to the Agence France-Presse, the Taliban said in a statement that: "You should bring the invading forces military bases under your brave attack, their military convoys, kill them, capture them, beat them, and teach them a lesson that they will never again dare to insult the Holy Koran." An e-mail from the Taliban accused "the invading infidel authorities" of trying to calm the situation with two "so-called show of apologies, but in reality they let their inhuman soldiers insult our holy book."

Supranational bodies

- (NATO) ISAF – ISAF commander John R. Allen said: "When we learned of these actions [troops burning the Quran], we immediately intervened and stopped them. The materials recovered will be properly handled by [the] appropriate religious authorities ... We are thoroughly investigating the incident and we are taking steps to ensure this does not ever happen again. I assure you – I promise you – this was not intentional in any way."
- On 24 February the German Army announced that 50 soldiers would leave a military base in Taloqan after a group of peaceful protesters gathered outside the base.

States

- Iran – The Iranian Ministry of Foreign Affairs condemned the burning of the Qurans. Foreign Minister Ali Akbar Salehi urged the United Nations Human Rights Council to officially condemn the burnings.
- United Kingdom – On 25 February a Foreign and Commonwealth Office spokesperson said all civilian employees would be temporarily withdrawn from Afghanistan.
- United States – On 23 February, President Barack Obama apologized to Afghan President Hamid Karzai over the mishandling of copies of the Quran to help stem the violent demonstrations. He also added that the act was "inadvertent" with a vow to hold the perpetrators responsible for their actions. In response to criticism of Obama's apology, White House spokesman Jay Carney said: "It is wholly appropriate, given the sensitivities to this issue, the understandable sensitivities. His primary concern as commander in chief is the safety of the American men and women in Afghanistan, of our military and civilian personnel there. And it was absolutely the right thing to do."
  - During campaigning for the Republican nomination for the presidential election, prospective candidate Newt Gingrich called Obama's apology to Karzai "astonishing". He added that: "There seems to be nothing that radical Islamists can do to get Barack Obama's attention in a negative way and he is consistently apologizing to people who do not deserve the apology of the President of the United States period. It is Hamid Karzai who owes the American people an apology, not the other way around. This destructive double standard whereby the United States and its democratic allies refuse to hold accountable leaders who tolerate systematic violence and oppression in their borders must come to an end."
  - Former Alaska Governor Sarah Palin added that "Obama apologizes for inadvertent Koran burning; now the US trained and protected Afghan Army can apologise for killing our soldiers yesterday."
- Australia – After the burnings of Islamic religious material, the Australian government condemned the actions of the US soldiers and issued a warning for all non-military Australians in Afghanistan to leave the country.
  - On 7 March 2012, Commonwealth war graves were vandalized in Libya as reprisal for the Quran burnings. Prime minister Julia Gillard condemned the actions and vowed to find those responsible where over 50 Australian graves were demolished.
