= 2003 in Afghanistan =

- Decades: 1980s; 1990s; 2000s; 2010s; 2020s
- See also: Other events of 2003; List of years in Afghanistan

2003 in Afghanistan is a list of notable events in Afghanistan during 2003

== Incumbents ==
- President: Hamid Karzai
- Vice President: Hedayat Amin Arsala
- Vice President: Mohammed Fahim
- Vice President: Nematullah Shahrani
- Vice President: Karim Khalili
- Chief Justice: Faisal Ahmad Shinwari

== Events ==
=== March ===
March 1:

- The United Nations High Commissioner for Refugees (UNHCR) announced that 395,752 Afghans had voluntarily returned home from Iran since a UNHCR joint program with Tehran to the effect began on April 9, 2002. (see details of the UNHCR Afghan repatriation programs)
- U.S. troops raided the compound of Haji Ghalib, the chief of security for Ghanikhel District of Nangarhar Province, arresting him and two others and seizing heavy weapons. Ghalib's son, Mohammed Shafiq, said the U.S. forces also seized missiles, mortars and a large quantity of anti-tank mines during the arrest. The two people detained along with Ghalib were not identified.
- Khalid Shaikh Mohammed was arrested in a joint raid by Central Intelligence Agency (CIA) agents and Pakistani police in Rawalpindi, Pakistan.

March 2: Germany pulled out its elite KSK anti-terror forces from Afghanistan. The German defense ministry refused to comment on the report.

March 4:

- President Karzai arrived in Qatar to participate in the summit of the Organisation of the Islamic Conference (OIC) to discuss the crisis in the Middle East.
- Gunmen killed Sher Nawaz Khan, a Pakistani intelligence official, in a border area near Afghanistan. Kahn was riding a motorbike to work in the border town of Wana, 180 miles (290 km) south of Peshawar. The gunmen followed Khan in a car then shot him repeatedly after knocking him off the motorbike.
- Qari Abdul Wali, a military commander in the hard-line Islamic Taliban regime said from a hideout near the southern Afghan town of Spin Boldak that the arrest of Khalid Sheikh Mohammed would not weaken the al Qaeda network.
- The U.S. Overseas Private Investment Corporation (OPIC) pledged a $50 million line of credit in support of U.S. private sector investment in Afghanistan. This was in addition to the $50 million OPIC line of credit that the Bush administration announced January 2002. One project will be the construction of a five-star international hotel in Kabul to be managed by Hyatt International, to which OPIC anticipates providing $35 million in financing and political risk insurance. OPIC will also provide political risk insurance to enable a U.S. manufacturer to donate a compressed earth block machine for the construction of three schools, at least one of which will be for girls.
- Afghanistan is declared the world's leading producer of heroin.

March 5:

- U.S. and Italian military officials announced that about 500 Italian troops would soon replace a similar number of U.S. soldiers deployed in eastern Afghanistan's Khost region. About 1,000 Italian soldiers from Task Force Nibbio had already arrived at Bagram Air Base. Officials said that 500 Italians will stay at Bagram and the remaining 500 were to take over in mid-March from Americans at Camp Salerno, a coalition base near the eastern town of Khost. To date 8,000 of the 13,000 coalition forces were from the U.S..

March 6: A preferential trade agreement was signed in a ceremony in New Delhi, India attended by President Karzai and Indian Prime Minister Atal Behari Vajpayee. The trade pact will enable free movement of goods specified by the two countries at lower tariffs. The volume of trade between the two countries in 2001-02 totaled $41.89 million. Vajpayee also announced a $70 million grant to rebuild a major road in Afghanistan. Included in the pledge was the third of three 232-seat Airbus 300-B4s to help rebuild Ariana Afghan Airlines.

March 7:

- During his 3-day visit of India, President Karzai told a business meeting in Delhi that he hoped India would join an oil pipeline project to ship gas from Turkmenistan via Afghanistan and Pakistan. Later, Mr Karzai flew to the Himalayan town of Shimla, India to pick up an honorary doctorate in literature from his alma mater. Mr. Karzai took a postgraduate course in political science at Himachal University from 1979 to 1983.
- Sardar Sanaullah Khan Zehri, home minister of Pakistan's Balochistan province, said two of Osama bin Laden's sons were wounded and possibly held by U.S. and Afghan troops in Ribat. The White House cast doubt on the report. Later, Zehri said that he had been misquoted.
- The Republic of Macedonia sent 10 soldiers to be stationed, under German command, in the Kabul.

March 8: The first Afghan radio station programmed solely for women began broadcasting in Kabul. The first broadcast was called "The Voice of Afghan Women." Director Jamila Mujahed said one-hour radio programs would be broadcast every afternoon in the local Pashtu and Dari languages in Kabul on 91.6 FM.

March 9: President Karzai said that he hoped war in Iraq could be avoided. But he also said the Iraqi people deserved to choose their own government.

March 10:

- Afghanistan officially activated its .af Internet domain name on for Afghan e-mail addresses and Web sites.
- The National Democratic Front was officially launched during a ceremony at a Kabul hotel. Its purpose was to foster Western-style democracy and act as a counterweight to Islamic fundamentalism.

March 11:

- President George W. Bush apologized to President Karzai for the way Karzai was treated by a U.S. Senate committee on February 26.
- A delegation of Afghan legal officials and experts gathered in Washington, D.C., completed a four-day conference managed by International Resources Group and hosted by the U.S. Institute of Peace. The participants worked by consensus to lay out the future of the justice system in Afghanistan.

March 12:

- The UNHCR began repatriating thousands of Afghan refugees from around 200 camps in Pakistan. The goal was to repatriate 600,000 refugees by year's end.
- In Kabul, Russian Foreign Minister Igor Ivanov met with President Karzai, Foreign Minister Dr. Abdullah and Defense Minister Mohammed Fahim.
- The World Bank announced a $108 million, 40-year no-interest loan to Afghanistan. The money was to be spent on repairing disintegrating roads, collapsed bridges, damaged tunnels and the runway at Kabul airport.
- The United States Agency for International Development announced a new $60 million program to rehabilitate Afghanistan's school system. The money was slated for the printing of 10 million textbooks in Dari and Pashtu languages. The money was also earmarked for the construction or reconstruction of about 1,200 primary schools in every province.
- Agha Murtaza Pooya, deputy head of the Pakistan Awami Tehreek, told the Pashto language service of Iranian Radio that Osama bin Laden was in custody but he did not know where he was being held. The governments of Pakistan and the U.S. denied the reports.

March 13: President Karzai called for increased aid to Afghanistan; he announced that the $4.5 billion estimated in 2002 would not be sufficient, and his government estimated that funds ranging from $15–$20 billion would be required to rebuild the Afghani economy.

March 14: Six Afghan agencies signed an agreement with the U.N. Mine Action Program for Afghanistan to share US$7.5 million of U.S. aid to clear land mines along roads and at school construction sites. The project was to be completed by the end of 2003.

March 15:

- German's suggestions for the North Atlantic Treaty Organization (NATO) to take over International Security Assistance Force(ISAF) in the Afghan capital of Kabul received a setback when Belgium joined France in opposing such a move.
- The first two brigades of the Afghan national army completed 10 weeks of training. To date, around 2,000 soldiers are said to have been trained so far, while thousands of other Afghans carry arms, and local warlords remain powerful figures. To date, attempts to form a national force were hampered by a lack of non-partisan volunteers, and divisions over how much representation different ethnic factions would have.

March 16: Afghanistan granted the release of all Pakistani prisoners (almost 1,000) held in its jails. No date was given for the release of the prisoners, mainly held in Sherberghan. Less than a week later, the number of prisoners to be released was reduced to 72.

March 17:

- The Wheat Disposal Committee announced that Pakistan Agricultural Supplies and Storages Corporation (PASSCO) would export around 300,000 tons of wheat to Afghanistan and Bangladesh.
- In Brussels, the European Union pledged €400 million (US$432 million) in financial aid to rebuild Afghanistan until the end of 2004. Canada pledged $250 million to Afghanistan for the same time frame.
- The United States Trade and Development Agency granted $280,081 to Afghanistan's government to study a proposed national high-speed telecommunications backbone. To date, one out of 625 Afghan citizens had access to telephone services.
- In Brussels, Afghanistan signed a tripartite agreement with Pakistan and the United Nations High Commissioner for Refugees(UNHCR) calling assistance in the voluntary return of Afghan refugees. Under the agreement, over 1.8 million Afghan displaced persons (DPs) would be voluntarily repatriated to Afghanistan by the end of 2006.

March 18:

- An agreement between Pakistan, Afghanistan and the UNHCR is scheduled to be signed in Geneva the repatriation of 600,000 Afghan refugees from Pakistan.
- Afghanistan's government signed a repatriation agreement in The Hague with the Netherlands, which at the time hosted about 40,000 Afghan refugees.

March 19:

- About two-hundred troops U.S. 82nd Airborne Division, led by a battalion of 800 known as the "White Devils", were ferried by helicopters into the Sami Ghar mountains, about 100 kilometers (62 mi) east of Kandahar, initiating Operation Valiant Strike. The objective was to locate Osama bin Laden and members of al Qaeda. The U.S. troops were accompanied by Romanian infantry.
- Afghan journalist Ahmed Shah Behzad, an employee of Radio Liberty, was detained, beaten and interrogated by local security forces in Herat. Governor Ismail Khan did not like the questions Mr. Behzad was putting to officials during opening ceremonies of the Afghan Independent Human Rights Commission.
- Pakistan approved transit facilities for Afghanistan, including deletion of eight items from the negative list of most controversial Afghanistan-Pakistan Transit Trade Agreement (APTTA), reduction in railways freight and new rail and road routes to facilitate the transportation of goods. The items deleted from the negative list are cotton yarn, polyester, metalised film, ball bearings, timers, tape recorders, glassware/dinner sets, juicers/blenders and videocassette recorders.
- Expected to replace the 1343 lunar year constitution, a tentative draft of a new Afghan constitution, called "the new constitution for the new Afghanistan", was completed. National unity, ensuring social justice and establishing democracy were stressed and any discrimination in ethnic, racial, religious and linguistic sensitivities would be banned.
- 6 U.S. soldiers are killed in a helicopter crash in Afghanistan during a medical mission.

March 20:

- All U.N. offices and embassies in Afghanistan were closed amid security concerns after the U.S. initiated its war against Iraq. Domestic flights continued, but international flights into Afghanistan were canceled. In Kabul, police stopped and searched most vehicles at major intersections causing mile-long traffic tie-ups. Coalition soldiers maintained a heavy presence on Chicken Street, a popular tourist destination for Westerners.
- As part of Operation Valiant Strike, U.S. troops poured into the villages of Gari Kaloay and Sekandarzay, Afghanistan, around 140 kilometres (87 mi) east of Kandahar.

March 21:

- The U.S.-backed Afghan government called for a quick end to the war in Iraq, saying President Saddam Hussein should leave Iraq. The statement read: "We want the people of Iraq to be free from despotism...It is in the interest of the Iraqi people for Saddam Hussein to leave power. The interests of the people of Iraq are higher than the interests of Saddam Hussein and his family...We want a united Iraq, with a government representing its people for peace and stability in the region and world."
- the United States liberated 18 Afghans being held at Guantanamo base. The prisoners were released in Kabul, Afghanistan, without compensation or any assistance to return home.

March 22:

- President Karzai delayed a four-day visit to Pakistan due to the Iraq War.
- The school year in most of Afghanistan officially started, but schools were closed because of a holiday for the Afghan New Year. Education Minister Yunus Qanooni said 5.8 million students would go to school, up from 3.3 million the year before. The United Nations had a more conservative estimate of about 4.5 million. Many villages set up informal schools in mosque courtyards, tents and private homes because they never had schools in the first place or the buildings were destroyed.

March 23:

- About 1,000 people in Mehtar Lam, Afghanistan demonstrated against the U.S.-led war in Iraq.
- A mediation team, consisting of United Nations officials and military officials from key northern factions, was dispatched to Latti, Afghanistan to stem fighting between Abdul Rashid Dostum and Atta Mohammed.

March 24:

- In reaction to questions raised by Ahmed Shah Behzad at the opening ceremonies of human rights commission on March 19, the governor Herat, Ismail Khan, expelled the Behzad from the province. Most journalists in Herat protested the move and went on strike to also demand more press freedom in the province.
- Afghanistan marked World Tuberculosis Day with a ceremony in Kabul. To date, Afghanistan had one of the highest incidences of the disease in the world, killing 23,000 a year.

March 25:

- In Afghanistan, a group of U.S.-led forces (dubbed Task Force Devil) participating in Operation Valiant Strike captured four suspected rebels and seizing a major weapons cache. The cache included electronic detonators, timers, dozens of mortar and rocket-propelled grenade rounds and land mines.
- In Jalalabad, more than 2,000 university students protesting the U.S.-led war on Iraq clashed with the security forces. Seven students were lightly injured. The confrontation began when students tried to remove barricades set up to prevent them from blocking the main Jalalabad-Kabul highway. Some students threw stones on two vehicles carrying U.S. special forces on the highway.
- Around 20 Canadian troops left for Afghanistan to pave the way for Canadian troops to join the U.N. peacekeeping force International Security Assistance Force (ISAF).
- The Perini Corporation was awarded a contract by the United States Army Corps of Engineers for the design and construction of facilities to support the First Brigade of the Afghan National Army, located near Kabul.

March 26:

- BearingPoint announced it had been awarded a three-year, $39.9 million contract from the United States Agency for International Development (USAID) to help Afghanistan implement policy and institutional reform measures that will lead to an improved environment for economic development. The agreement includes an option for another two years, for a total award of $64.1 million.
- Japan donated about US$20 million to Afghanistan. One source claimed the money was meant to help rebuild its transportation infrastructure, including buying new ambulances and buses. The Japan Times claimed the money was meant to create jobs, to promote education, and to create a constitution.

March 27: On the dirt road to Kandahar, Ricardo Munguia, an International Committee of the Red Cross water engineer, was fatally shot by gunmen, prompting the humanitarian aid agency to suspend operations across Afghanistan. After intercepting two Red Cross vehicles, the gunmen shot Muguia in the head, burned one car and warned two Afghans accompanying him not to work for foreigners. Abdul Salaam, a witness, alleged that Taliban leader Mullah Dadullah gave the gunmen their orders via mobile phone.

- Thailand's government, working with the Asian Foundation for Wheelchair Users and the Thai Foundation for the Disabled, sent 100 wheelchairs to the people of Afghanistan.
- At least 11 people were killed and 2,000 were affected by floods which damaged hundreds of homes in Kunduz Province. The district of Khanabad and the major city of Mazari Sharif were affected the greatest. U.N. aid agencies, along with local and national governments mobilized to provide food, plastic sheeting, blankets and other emergency assistance.
- The International Organization for Migration (IOM), the United Nations High Commissioner for Refugees (UNHCR) and the Afghan Ministry for Refugees and Repatriation began a joint registration exercise in the northern provinces of Takhar, Jowzjan, Sar-e Pol, Faryab, Balkh, Samangan, Baghlan, Kunduz and Badakhshan. An estimated 45,000 internally displaced persons were to be registered by 76 registration teams.
- In Washington, D.C., Representatives Carolyn Maloney and Dana Rohrabacherintroduced the Access for Afghan Women Act into the United States Congress. The intention of the bill was to lay out a roadmap for incorporating women into Afghanistan's development process. Such incorporation would be achieved through funding organizations such as the Ministry of Women's Affairs (MOWA) and the National Human Rights Commission.
- Despite President Karzai previously ordered that there would be no zones in Afghanistan, deputy defence minister General Abdul Rashid Dostum created an office for the North Zone of Afghanistan. Disobeying Karzai's order, Dostum appointed the following officials to the North Zone: Lt-Gen Mohammad Daud Azizi and Lt-Gen Majid Rozi as deputies of the Control and Management; Lt-Gen Mohammad Shahzada as head of the departments of the Control and Management; Lt-Gen Esmatollah as general head of operations of the Control and Management.

March 28:

- The United Nations Security Council voted unanimously to extend the U.N. assistance mission in Afghanistan for another year, enough time to see the country through to general elections.
- Claiming to be somewhere in Afghanistan, senior Taliban military commander Mullah Dadullah told the BBC that the Taliban hoped to regain power in Afghanistan, utilizing popular support. Dadullah said that the Taliban had regrouped under the leadership of Mullah Mohammed Omar and were attacking U.S.-led coalition troops with renewed vigour and ferocity. He added that the Taliban would fight until "Jews and Christians, all foreign crusaders" were expelled from Afghanistan. According to Dadullah, al-Qaeda no longer existed in Afghanistan and that he did not know the fate or whereabouts of Osama bin Laden.
- The Asian Development Bank forwarded a draft proposal to Pakistan, Turkmenistan, and Afghanistan regarding India's participation in a proposed 1,300 km Turkmenistan-Afghanistan-Pakistan natural gas pipeline project. The draft was subject to approval of all parties.

March 29:

- An earthquake of 5.5 magnitude rattled parts of Afghanistan and Pakistan. The quake, which was centered about 60 miles north of Peshawar, was felt in Kabul for about 30 seconds.
- Afghanistan's government set up a special bank account to channel money for humanitarian aid to Iraq and urged wealthy Afghans to contribute to it. Money from the account, which was opened at the central bank in Kabul, would be delivered to the Iraqi people later by the U.N. special envoy to Afghanistan, Lakhdar Brahimi.

March 30:

- The draft of a proposed constitution was presented to President Karzai.

March 31:

- After fierce fighting during a joint operation with U.S.-led coalition forces in central Afghanistan's Oruzgan Province, Afghan government troops captured Mulla Ahdul Razaq, minister of commerce of the former Taliban regime.
- The participation by Norwegian F-16 fighters in the U.S.-led military operations in Afghanistan came to its scheduled end.
- Pakistan closed Katcha Garhi, one of its oldest Afghan refugee camps, uprooting about 60,000 refugees.

=== April ===
April 1: Speaking on Afghan television, the Information and Culture Minister, Makhdum Rahin, said that the country was making progress in encouraging an independent media. He also encouraged Afghanistan's young journalists to criticize the government and himself personally, when mistakes were made.

- In Islamabad, Shaukat Aziz announced that Pakistan would actively participate in the reconstruction of Afghanistan and undertake various development projects for the welfare of its people. Aziz said that a Pakistani private construction company has obtained a 25 million U.S. dollar contract to build a road link from Chaman to Kandahar and a 30 million US dollar sub-contract in other reconstruction projects.

April 2: A deminer from U.S. military contractor Ronco lost his right foot after stepping on a mine near the Bagram base.

- Afghan forces mounted an operation near Spinboldak against 50 to 60 suspected terrorists. Two government soldiers were killed and one wounded in the fighting. Seven suspected terrorists were captured.

April 3:

- The UN extended a ban on travel for its staff in southern Afghanistan to give local authorities time to improve security in the area where a foreign aid worker was murdered a week earlier.
- The U.N. special investigator for human rights in Afghanistan, Kamal Hossain, told the United Nations Human Rights Commission meeting in Geneva that insufficient funding for Afghanistan could jeopardize the development of such groups as the army and police, which are important to ensure stability. He added that the absence of enough security forces would embolden warlords around the country to harass different ethnic tribes and to roll back educational opportunities for women and girls. To date, Afghanistan had received almost $2 billion out the $4.5 billion pledged by the international community.
- The humanitarian projects board of the U.S.-led coalition approved 19 assistance and reconstruction projects valued at $722,000. The projects included water improvement and the construction of medical clinics and schools in 10 provinces.
- Afghan militia soldiers (number about 250) and U.S.-led coalition plane-strikes killed eight suspected Taliban fighters in the Tor Ghar mountains near Spinboldak. One Afghan militia member was killed and three others were injured. Fifteen suspects were taken into custody. In the cleanup the soldiers found and confiscated light machine guns, bomb-making materials, improvised explosive devices, two trucks, two motorcycles and ammunition. More than 35,000 pounds of ordnance were dropped or fired from five types of aircraft — Harrier jets, B-1 bombers, A-10 Thunderbolts and helicopter gunships — on the rebel positions.
- Haji Gilani and his nephew were killed outside their home in Deh Rawood by six gunmen. According to witnesses, one of the gunmen was Mardan Khan, whose brother was a Taliban commander, but no arrests were made.

April 4: An Afghan agricultural department official Aibak announced that an international aid organization had sent experts to Samangan province to train hundreds of people in anti-locust measures and had supplied spraying equipment to eliminate the pest. Locusts were threatening the region's crops for a second year running.

April 5: Kandahar Governor Gul Agha Sherzai gave Taliban loyalists in his province 48 hours to leave Afghanistan. The warning came hours after his soldiers killed two Taliban fighters and captured seven others with bombs and ammunition near the town of Spinboldak.

- Afghan officials announced their forces had killed more than 50 suspected Taliban rebels in fighting in Badghis province, and captured Mullah Badar and Juma Khan.

April 6: Officials announced a U.N.-sponsored program to disarm, demobilize and reintegrate an estimated 100,000 fighters across Afghanistan over the next three years, starting in July. Former fighters would be provided with vocational training, employment opportunities and access to credit. Others would be given the chance to apply for positions in the national army. Funded by Japan, Canada, Britain and the U.S., the program has a three-year budget of $157 million.

- The United Nations removed a ban on the movement of U.N. personnel in southern Afghanistan, however the International Committee of the Red Cross, with 150 foreign workers in Afghanistan, suspended operations indefinitely. The U.N. ban had been imposed ten days earlier when Ricardo Munguia, of the International Committee of the Red Cross, was pulled out of his car and shot dead.
- The United Nations Children's Fund warned that millions of Afghan women and children continued to face major health and nutrition problems, with maternal and infant mortality in Afghanistan among the worst in the world. To day, Afghanistan's infant mortality rate was 165 per 1,000 live births, and its maternal mortality ratio was 1,600 maternal deaths per 100,000 live births. In its report, UNICEF also said it had received 65 percent of its $35 million budget for Afghan programs in 2003 and called on donors to fill the shortage.
- Nearly 50 suspected Taliban fighters attacked an Afghan government checkpost in the Shingai district of Zabul province. Three Afghan government troops were wounded. The fighters fled after a brief gun battle, but government troops captured 20 of them a day later during raids on several villages in the region.

April 8: U.S. soldiers began a house-to-house for suspected Taliban in the Sangeen, Helmand province. The search focused on locating Mullah Dadullah and Mullah Akhtar Mohammed. Both had been reported in the area only a few weeks prior.

- Afghanistan's first computer networking class, consisting of six women and eleven men, graduated from the University of Kabul. The university's Networking Academy was jointly launched in October 2002 by the United Nations Development Programme and Cisco Systems.
- A major new operation, Resolute Strike, was launched in Helmand province, involving 500 soldiers as well as attack and assault helicopters.
- The fifth meeting of the Steering Committee on the Turkmen-Afghan-Pakistan gas pipelineproject opened in Manila, Philippines, where the headquarters of the Asian Development Bank sits.

April 9: Eleven Afghans were killed and one wounded when a stray U.S. laser-guided bomb hit a house on the outskirts of Shkin in Paktika province. The bomb was fired by U.S. Marine Corps AV-8 Harrier II air support that had been summoned by coalition forces in pursuit of two groups of five to 10 enemy personnel. The enemy attackers had attacked an Afghan military post checkpoint, wounding four government soldiers. Amnesty International promptly called for an investigation.

April 11: On a one-day visit from Doha, Qatar, Head of the U.S. Central Command General Tommy Franks visited the U.S. military headquarters at Bagram Air Base in Afghanistan. Franks then traveled to Kabul to meet President Karzai and the U.S. ambassador to Afghanistan.

- Authorities and humanitarian organizations began an emergency relief operation to assist over 200 vulnerable families affected by the April 10 earthquake in Yaka Baghi and Sag Baghi. Organizations participating in the relief operations included the United Nations Assistance Mission for Afghanistan, the Afghan Ministry of Rural Rehabilitation and Development, Relief International, Mercy Corps and the World Food Programme. Kabul Radio reported that the quake-hit families in the two villages were in poor condition. It quoted a local source as saying the villagers lacked shelter and needed urgent assistance from the government and international organisations working in Afghanistan.

April 12: A taxi packed with explosives exploded in Karwan Sarui, four miles east of Khost, killing four people who apparently were planning a terrorist attack. Two of the killed were unidentified Pakistani nationals a third was from Yemen. The fourth, the driver, was identified as Bacha Malkhui in one report and Zarat Khan in another report, a former intelligence officer for the deposed Taliban government. The blast destroyed a two-story home and injured a nearby woman.

- The International Committee of the Red Cross announced it had resumed most of its operations in Afghanistan after a two-week suspension following the murder of Ricardo Munguia. However, travel for ICRC employees outside many major cities remained off-limits, and, in remote areas considered insecure, some programs were postponed indefinitely or canceled. As a consequence of the heightened dangers, the ICRC also announced that it would its permanent expatriate staff in Afghanistan by about 25 people, to around 120. To date, the ICRC employed 1,500 Afghans.
- Zabul province officials announced that Orfeo Bartolini, an Italian tourist, had been shot to death, by suspected Taliban gunmen.

April 13: Mohammed Sharif Sherzai, a brother of Gul Agha Sherzai, the governor of Kandahar province, escaped unhurt from an assault by gunmen on motorcycles near the Pakistani border town of Chaman. However, a cousin and another relative, Qasim Khan, were killed and two Afghan guards were wounded. The gunmen escaped. Afghan border officials accused Pakistan of involvement.

- Afghan authorities brokered a cease-fire between the Hezb-e-Wahadat and Harakat-e-Islami parties in the town of Surk Deh in Samangan province. The fighting began April 10 and resulted in at least five deaths, including four civilians, one of whom was a 6-year-old child.

April 14: Pamphlets distributed in Afghan refugee camps in Pakistan urged Afghans to revolt against the U.S. and the government of President Karzai.

April 15: While driving to Mazari Sharif, Afghan Commander Shahi and two of his bodyguards were killed in an ambush in the Char Bolak area. Shahi had served for more than 15 years as a commander for General Abdul Rashid Dostum. The assailants were not caught, but it was alleged that they were members of the Jamiat-e-Islami group led by Ustad Atta Mohammad.

- UNICEF began a three-day polio immunization campaign aimed at reaching every child under 5 years old Afghanistan. An estimated 30,000 vaccinators and volunteers from the Afghan Ministry of Health, the World Health Organization and UNICEF were expected to administer two drops of oral polio vaccine to more than 6 million children.
- The International Organization for Migration announced that, due to factional fighting in the region that began in March, it was delaying the return of hundreds of internally displaced persons to Faryab province in Afghanistan.
- The United Nations High Commissioner for Refugees announced that the pace of repatriating Afghan refugees slowed due to the security situation.

April 16: NATO agreed to take command in August of the International Security Assistance Force (ISAF) in Afghanistan. The decision came at the request of Germany and the Netherlands, the two nations leading ISAF at the time of the agreement. It was approved unanimously by all 19 NATO ambassadors. This marked first time in NATO's history that it took charge of a mission outside the north Atlantic area. Canada had originally been slated to take over ISAF in August.

- A blast damaged the UNICEF office in Jalalabad, but there were no casualties. The office was empty at the time. Security commander Haji Ajab Shah said the explosion appeared to have been caused by an improvised explosive device made from automatic rifle bullets.
- Over 100 Afghan and U.S. soldiers crossed into Pakistan along the Durand Line allegedly without realizing it to conduct a survey to supply water to tribesmen. They had been invited by a local tribal leader, but were forced to leave the area after Pakistan forces challenged them. Coalition forces claimed that no direct firing took place, but machine gun firing took place. Hundreds of troops were then deployed by Pakistan and Afghanistan. Afghan forces moved tanks, heavy weaponry and reinforcements to the area.

April 17: Afghan border forces clashed with alleged Pakistan militiamen who intruded into border village of Gulam Khan, south of the town of Khost. However, Pakistani officials denied that any of their militia had crossed the border, saying Afghan soldiers had merely traded fire with tribesmen living in the border region.

- Kabul Radio in Afghanistan said that Taliban Maulawi Mohammed Qalamuddin had been arrested by Afghan security agents and was being detained in Logar province.
- During Operation Carpathian Lightning, over two days, Romanian troops found three caches of weapons in two caves near the town of Qalat, Zabul Province. The caches included 3,000 107mm rockets, 250,000 rounds of 12.7mm machinegun ammunition, about 1,000,000 rounds of small arms ammunition and other ammunition and mines.

April 18: Dana Rohrabacher, a senior member of the U.S. Congress foreign relations committee, met with rival faction leaders Abdul Rashid Dostum and Ustad Atta Mohammad in Mazari Sharif. After the meeting, Rohrabacher told the media that, if bloody ethnic feuds were to be resolved in Afghanistan, regional autonomy was essential.

- At least five people died from powerful floods that washed away houses in the Sha Gho valley of Helmand province, on the Shomali plain just north of Kabul. 25 others were missing, three of these children. 200 families were evacuated by helicopter due to flood waters.

April 19: The UN announced that it would not investigate two mass graves in Afghanistan containing hundreds of war victims unless international troops protect the operation. The graves may contain Taliban prisoners killed in the Dasht-i-Leili massacre of 2001 and victims of the Jaghalkani-i-Takhta Pul massacres of 1998.

April 20: An emergency meeting was held in Kabul at the Ministry of Rural Rehabilitation and Development with U.N.agencies and NGOs for the coordination of relief efforts for the 200 families displaced by flooding on April 18.

- In Afghanistan, a two-day national military meeting, that brought together regional commanders, government leaders and commanders of U.S.-led forces for the first time, came to a close.

April 21: The Rabia Balkhi Women's Hospital in Kabul reopened after the completion of a six-month renovation project supported by the United States Department of Health and Human Services. U.S. Secretary of Health and Human Servicessecretary Tommy Thompson took part in the dedication.

- Afghan authorities announced that they had arrested five men on suspicion of murdering four foreign journalists at Tangi Abrishum on November 19, 2001.
- The Pakistan government announced that it had released 50 Afghan prisoners as a gesture of goodwill, a day before President Karzai was to arrive for meetings.
- The cabinet of President Karzai approved a law allowing cable television networks in Kabul to resume broadcasting programs. Cable broadcasts had been banned by the supreme court Chief Justice Mawlavi Fazl Hadi Shinwariearlier in the year for being obscene and un-Islamic.
- In a southern Afghan raid aimed at catching those responsible for the March 27 murder of Ricardo Munguia, U.S. special forces killing one man and detained seven others. Weapons were also seized by the U.S. forces.

April 22: The highest ranking Afghan officials, including President Karzai arrived Islamabad, Pakistan to discuss border disputes, terrorism, trade, and exchanges of prisoners. Tensions between the two nations had recently flared up along the ill-defined Durand line, each side accusing the other of intrusion. Many in the Afghan government still viewed Pakistan, which nurtured and supported the Taliban regime, with suspicion. Accusations had been made that Pakistan was harboring Taliban fugitives. Pakistan had concerns about Afghanistan's failure to fulfil promises in March to release up to 800 Pakistani prisoners. In the course of the day, Karzai met separately with Pakistani Prime Minister Zafarullah Jamali and President Pervez Musharraf.

- The United Nations High Commissioner for Refugees reported that, to date, more than 19,000 Afghans had been processed through voluntary repatriation from Iran in 2003.

April 23: After a meeting in Islamabad, between Afghan Foreign Minister Abdullah and Pakistani Foreign Minister Khurshid Mahmud Kasuri, the two nations announced an agreement to hold political consultations twice a year in Islamabad and Kabul alternatively. The purpose of the meetings was to monitor progress in the promotion of bilateral cooperation and to take follow-up actions.

- During a joint meeting between Pakistani and Afghan Ministers at the finance ministry in Islamabad, Pakistan Finance minister Shaukat Aziz offered Afghanistan the chance to establish a free industrial zone near the Torkhum and Chaman border. Afghanistan identified over 3,000 projects and invited the private sector to invest in them.
- The U.S. military reported that "a handful" of the Afghan war prisoners held at Camp X-Ray in Guantánamo Bay, had been identified as juveniles and were separated from the adult prisoners.
- Using rockets and automatic weapons, rebel fighters attacked a government office in Chapan in Zabul province. Two Afghan soldiers and three assailants were killed in the four-hour shootout. Taliban forces seized the headquarters of the Deh-i-Chopan district of the province, capturing its officials, including Mohammad Nawab. Government forces then retook the district.

April 24: A spokesman for the United Nations Food and Agriculture Organization reported that they are investigating whether the unidentified illness killing off Afghanistan's sheep population was Foot and mouth disease, pasteurellosis or goat plague. The fatality rate of newborn lambs in the country was over 80%.

- Yunis Qanuni, the Afghan Minister of Education, appealed for donors to provide more funds for schools. To date, the ministry had received US$86 million in 2003, leaving the budget short US$114 million.

April 25: At Shkin, in Paktika province, near the Pakistani border, two U.S. soldiers were killed and several other U.S. and Afghan soldiers were wounded in a clash with unknown attackers. The U.S. estimated that at least three of the attackers were killed. Two F-16 Fighting Falcons, two USAF A-10 Thunderbolt tankbusters and two AH-64 Apache attack helicopters responded. Two days later, two rebel corpses were discovered near the site. One of the U.S. soldiers killed was identified as Airman first class Raymond Losano and PFC Jerod Dennis Bco 3/504 PIR.

- In Kabul, the Irish Club shut itself down after warnings that it could be the target of a terror attack. The nightclub had originally opened on March 17. It was frequented by aid workers, diplomats and journalists. Afghans were not allowed to patronize the club because the sale of alcohol was against the law.

April 26: In an operation launched April 24, U.S. and Afghan forces arrested several Taliban suspects near Spin Boldak.

April 27: U.S. Defense Secretary Donald Rumsfeld postponed a scheduled visit to Afghanistan, where he was to meet with Afghan leaders and coalition troops.

- In a statement released to the Afghan Islamic Press, Gulbuddin Hekmatyar said the U.S.-led war on Iraq triggered widespread Islamic hatred toward the U.S. that will be hard to wipe out. He also said the U.S. victory in Iraq was the start of U.S. attempts to control the entire Middle East.
- The United Nations and the Afghan Independent Human Rights Commission accused fighters in Badghis province of violating human rights during clashes in March between rebel forces and soldiers loyal to the local governor, Gul Mohammed Khan. The human rights delegation confirmed that at least 38 civilians, including three women and 12 children, were killed as homes and shops were looted in Akazi. In the same area, local forces pursuing Juma Khan, executed 26 prisoners whose hand were tied behind their backs.

April 28: At least 15 rebel fighters and 15 Afghan soldiers were killed in battles in the Chopan district of Zabul province.

- Amnesty International condemned a British decision to forcibly return a group of asylum-seekers to Afghanistan. An Amnesty International mission earlier in April concluded that conditions were still not conducive to the promotion of voluntary and forced returns.
- A three-day teleconference began between Afghan officials and the U.S. regarding markets for Afghan goods, the Generalized System of Preferences, rules of origin requirements, and tariffs.
- Under a voluntary repatriation program facilitated by the U.N. refugee agency, thirty-nine Afghan Turkmen families headed home from Attock, Pakistan.

April 29:

- A Belgian court opened and immediately adjourned the trial of 12 suspects linked to the September 9, 2001 murder of Afghan rebel Ahmad Shah Masood. The presiding judge ruled that the trial would resume May 22. Also, President Karzai appointed a commission to track down those who ordered the murder. Interior Minister Ali Ahmad Jalali was named to lead the commission.
- U.S. Maj. Gen. John Vines, commander of 82nd Airborne Division in Afghanistan, handed control of combat missions to Lt. Gen. Dan McNeill, the overall commander of coalition troops in Afghanistan. Vines stated "I think there are renegade elements in Iran who have an interest in controlling a portion of Afghanistan....I think there are elements in Pakistan — not the government — that have an interest in creating instability....In certain parts, the country is stable. In other parts, it's terribly dangerous....That has not changed and that probably won't change in the foreseeable future....If you had to design an area to support an anti-government movement, you might describe an area like this....Multiple borders, extreme distances, lack of road infrastructure, high mountains, weak central government, areas where there are religious or tribal (conflicts)....It applies absolutely right here."

April 30: Pakistani officials announced they had apprehended six al-Qaeda suspects in Karachi, Pakistan. One of the men, Waleed bin Attash (aka Khalid al-Attash), was a Yemeni national wanted in connection with the USS Cole bombing. The other five suspects were Pakistanis. The six suspects were allegedly planning to carry out a series of terrorist attacks in Karachi and other parts of Pakistan.

- Afghan Interior Minister Ali Ahmad Jalali inaugurated an Afghan Human Rights Department aimed at curbing abuses by Afghan police forces. As a branch of the Afghan Independent Human Rights Commission, the department opened offices across the country.
- Dr. Abdullah Shirzai, the policy director of the Afghan Health Ministry, said that the Afghan government would take steps to reduce maternal and child mortality in the country. To date, 16 women in every 1,000 pregnancies died, and one child in four died before the age of five. Such rates were said to be among the worst in human history. The ministry planned to employ more than 20,000 health workers, mostly women nurses and midwives, over the span of a year.

=== May ===
May 1: The membership of Afghanistan in the International Criminal Court was scheduled to take effect. After this date, the ICC was to have the authority to investigate and prosecute serious war crimes, genocide and crimes against humanitycommitted on Afghan soil.

- U.S. Defense Secretary Donald Rumsfeld met President Karzai at the presidential palace in Kabul. Rumsfeld also met with U.S.-coalition leader Lieutenant General Dan McNeill and toured a training base for the fledgling Afghan National Army. A senior U.S. official accompanying Rumsfeld said the U.S. was "moving out of major combat operations and...into reconstruction, stability and humanitarian relief operations." Rumsfeld's visit was a short lay over on his way from Kuwait to London.
- Speaking on television, Fazil Ahmed Manawi, the deputy chief of the Afghan Supreme Court, read a resolution made by a council of 350 Islamic scholars that urged Afghan women working outside of their homes to wear the traditional hijab. The statement also urged the government to punish publications that violated Islamic values. The council also called on the government to promotemadrassas and to give the Islamic scholars, in recognition of their role in the resistance to the Soviet invasion of Afghanistan, a say in the government.
- Afghan Interior Minister Ali Ahmad Jalali ordered release of 72 Pakistani prisoners and promised more would be freed soon.

May 2: The U.S. announced the resumption of the Fulbright Program for Afghanistan. The one-year, non-degree program would start in September and allow at least twenty Afghan students to go to the U.S. for study and training. The Program had been suspended in 1979 following the Soviet invasion of Afghanistan.

May 5: Afghan police arrested eight militants for the May 3 murder of a driver in the Saydabad District of Wardak province

- The U.S. released 22 prisoners Camp X-Ray at Guantanamo Bay, Cuba. Information about the nationalities and the destination of those released was not given.
- Ariana Afghan Airlines made its first flight to Russia since 1996.

May 6: In Kabul, an estimated 300 Afghan government workers and university students demonstrated against the U.S., complaining that not enough had been done to rebuild the country or provide jobs and security. The protest was organized by the "Scientific Center" headed by Sediq Afghan.

- Lakhdar Brahimi, the U.N. special representative to Afghanistan, warned the United Nations Security Council that rising insecurity was a serious threat to the Afghan peace process.

May 7: Lakhdar Brahimi, the U.N. special representative for Afghanistan, told the United Nations Security Council that frequent attacks by rebels on aid workers and on Afghans as well as deadly factional clashes posed serious threats to the future of Afghanistan.

- Approximately 30 detainees (mostly Afghani, a few Pakistani) were transferred from Afghanistan to Camp X-ray in Guantánamo Bay.
- Afghan Water and Power Minister Mohammed Shakir Kargar said that only 5% of Afghanistan's 25 million people had access to electricity.
- India's Border Roads Organization began construction on a highway to link Afghanistan and Iran.
- Outside a mosque in Kalacha, Afghanistan, Habibullah, a Muslim cleric close to President Karzai, was shot to death. Six people had been detained.

May 8: Two Afghan factions fought a gunbattle in Helmand Province, injuring two Afghan soldiers. The clash prompted U.S.-led coalition forces to call in two A-10s from Bagram air base as air support. The two wounded soldiers were evacuated to the U.S. air base at Kandahar.

- In separate raids on the outskirts of Karachi, Pakistan, Pakistani officials arrested two Afghans for suspected links with al Qaeda. The suspects were identified as Ismat Kaka and Ibadat Jan. Weapons and cell phones were seized.
- Eleven men released from Camp X-Ray in Cuba on May 5 arrived in Bagram Air Base, Afghanistan, where they remained in custody. The men no apology or compensation for their time, but they did receive a bag containing a new pair of pants and tennis shoes, a jacket, underwear and a bottle of shampoo. Two of the men expressed bitterness at being sent to the prison in Guantanamo Bay without being questioned first at home.
- Communications director for the Afghan Reconstruction and Development Center, Khaleda Atta, called on the Bush administration to lay out a specific plan for fully funded and comprehensive reconstruction in Afghanistan.
- A three-day Rebuild Afghanistan Trade Fair came to an end, climaxing in a US$220 million trade agreement signed between Pakistani and Afghan traders for exports such as carpet yarn, vegetable oil, polythene sheets, tobacco and construction material.

May 9: U.S. Deputy Secretary of State Richard Armitage met President Karzai and other senior officials in Kabul. Security concerns along the Afghan-Pakistan border were discussed. Armitage said the U.S. did not support a recent appeal by the United Nations for international peacekeepers to be deployed outside Kabul. He also handed a check to the Afghan government for US$100,000 to help refurbish Afghan National Museum.

- In New Delhi, Indian federal civil aviation minister Shahnawaz Hussain told Afghan civil aviation minister Mirwais Sadiqthat India would assist Afghanistan in building its aviation infrastructure. The assistance was contingent on Pakistan opening its airspace to India.

May 10: An Afghan soldier was killed and a U.S. special forces soldier wounded in firefights the Khost area of Afghanistan. A U.S. A-10 aircraft and AH-64 helicopters were called in to kill the remaining opposing fighters.

May 11: Southeast of Mazari Sharif, Afghanistan, six people were killed in a clash between loyalists to Abdul Rashid Dostum and another faction.

- In Afghanistan, demonstrators rallied against an amnesty offer that President Karzai made to some Taliban members.

May 12: In Afghanistan, dozens of state truck drivers blocked a highway to protest against non-payment of wages.

- A report by the independent Afghanistan Research and Evaluation Unit (AREU) found that land-ownership disputes were the most common conflict in Afghanistan.

May 13: A second group of 13 medics from Hungary were scheduled to leave for Afghanistan. The first group left on March 8, 2003.

- In the northern part of Kabul, Afghanistan, two Norwegian soldiers with the International Security Assistance Force were shot and wounded. A soldier with the 8th Afghan National Army division was arrested.
- The British Army announced it would establish a base in Mazari Sharif, Afghanistan to work on rebuilding and security.
- The State Bank of Pakistan imposed a ban on opening of Letters of Credit for the import of 18 items meant for Afghanistan. The items were tobacco substitutes, non-cotton yarn, dyes, PVC and PMC materials, black tea, capacitors, art silk fabrics, vegetable ghee, cooking oil, tyres and tubes, refrigerators, air conditioners, televisions, soap and shampoos, auto parts, telephones, razor or shaving blades, and video cassettes.

May 14: Iran signed an agreement to train Afghan pilots and to help rebuild Afghan airports in Balkh Province and Herat Province.

- Pakistan hosted the first-ever meeting of the Tripartite Commission in Islamabad with the government of Afghanistan and the United Nations High Commissioner for Refugees to discuss the ongoing return and reintegration of Afghan refugees.

May 15: The World Trade Organization is expected to consider the application of Afghanistan to their body.

- Clashes between rival forces loyal to Ustad Atta Mohammad and to General Abdul Rashid Dostum took place in the Gosfandiarea of Sar-i-Pul Province, killing at least two followers from each side. Atta's men imprisoned a Dostum commander during the exchange. Fighting between the rival forces also took place in the Daraye Souf region in Samangan Province.
- In Spin Boldak, Afghanistan, one person was killed and three others injured when a bomb exploded in a small mosque at the local municipal authority's office. It was believed to be a suicide bombing.
- A British soldier was slightly wounded in Kabul when an Afghan man threw a grenade at a British peacekeeping base.
- Gunmen attacked a Mine Evaluation Training Agency vehicle on Sathi Kandaw pass between Gardez and Khost, prompting the United Nations to suspended travel along the route. The driver was shot in the chest and one mine clearer suffered superficial head wounds. The incident also prompted the U.N. to provide escorts for its vehicles.

May 16: The Asian Development Bank allocated $500 million for Afghanistan's reconstruction.

May 17: After completing a physical training run, a U.S. soldier died at the Kabul Military Training Center in Afghanistan.

- U.S. special forces troops seized a weapons cache near Jalalabad. The cache included nearly 400 mortar rounds and over 70 rockets.
- In caves at Maymana, near Mazari Sharif, Afghanistan, special forces discovered tank rounds and small arms ammunition, and transferred them to the Afghan National Army.
- A U.S. military vehicle struck two Afghan boys in Gardez, killing one and injuring the other. The accident occurred after the two boys ran across a street as a three-vehicle convoy was passing. The injured boy was treated and released.
- The Confederation of Indian Industry announced the signing of a Preferential Trade Agreement between India and Afghanistan.

May 18: The Afghan government launched a training program to create a 50,000-strong national police force and 12,000 border police by 2008.

May 19: In a speech broadcast on Afghan television, President Karzai threatened to dissolve the government unless provincial leaders started paying their taxes. Karzai said he would call another Loya Jirga to form a new government in the coming two or three months if the situation did not improve.

May 20: The twelve provincial governors of Afghanistan signed an agreement to deliver millions of dollars of customs revenue owed to the central government. The finance ministry said that customs revenues exceeded half a billion dollars in 2002, but only $80 million reached Kabul. Under the agreement, Uzbek leader, General Abdul Rashid Dostum, would no longer serve as President Karzai's special envoy for the northern regions and other officials would have to follow the suit.

- Pakistani Federal Minister for Kashmir Affairs and Water & Power Aftab Ahmad Sherpao met with President Karzai to discuss repatriation of Afghan refugees.

May 21: Outside the U.S. embassy In Kabul, U.S. troops shot dead three or four Afghan soldiers and wounded four others when they mistakenly thought they were about to come under attack. "The U.S. soldiers thought the Afghan soldiers were aiming guns at them", a U.S. intelligence official said. "They panicked and opened fire."

May 22: In a Belgian court, the trial opened of 23 alleged Islamic militants linked to the murder of Afghan rebel Ahmad Shah Masood and the planning of anti-U.S. attacks in Europe. The two main defendants were Nizar Trabelsi and Tarek Maaroufi.

- In Paris, France, drug experts and foreign ministers from Europe and Asia met to address the massive flows of opium and heroin coming out of Afghanistan.

May 23: In collaboration with the Afghan Ministry of Health, the Afghan Ministry of Interior Affairs launched child census and polio vaccination campaign.

- Afghan Finance Minister Ashraf Ghani announced that the government would appoint new provincial customs directors to organize the flow of revenue to the central government.

May 24: About 80 demonstrators marched through downtown Kabul for several hours to protest the accidental slaying of three or four Afghan soldiers by U.S. troops on May 21. Some demonstrators hurled rocks. Some chanted "Death to America" and "Death to Karzai." A demand was made that the U.S. soldiers involved in the incident be handed over to the local authorities. At least one ISAF soldier was hurt and two vehicles damaged.

May 25: Afghan authorities arrested Mullah Janan, a suspected military commander of the former Taliban regime, and two of his aides. The authorities accused Janan of plotting attacks on Afghan government buildings.

May 26: A Ukrainian plane crashed near the Black Sea city of Trabzon in northeast Turkey, killing all aboard. The plane carried 13 crew-members (12 Ukrainians and one Belarusian) and 62 Spanish soldiers returning from a six-month peacekeeping mission in Afghanistan. Initially, the cause of the accident was blamed on thick fog, however some witnesses stated that the aircraft was afire.

May 27: Command of U.S. forces in Afghanistan were handed over from the U.S. Army's XVIII Airborne Corps to the U.S. 10th Mountain Division. Lt. Gen. Dan McNeill also ended his tour of duty. In a ceremony on the helicopter runway of Bagram Air Base, Maj. Gen. John Vines took over command.

- Taliban leader Mullah Ghausuddin and associate Mullah Mohammad were killed in a gun battle in Zabul province. An Afghan government soldier was wounded.
- In Beijing, Chinese VP Zeng Qinghong and Afghan VP Nimartullah Shaharani signed a US$1 million aid agreement for the Afghanistan reconstruction trust fund. The two leaders also agreed to re-establish the China Afghanistan Friendship Association and set up ties between Peking University and Kabul University.
- In Karachi, Pakistan, a seminar on the potential Turkmenistan-Afghanistan–Pakistan–India pipeline took place under the auspices of the Society of Petroleum Engineers Pakistan Section. Over 75 professionals attended.
- Iranian Minister of Commerce Mohammad Shariatmadari arrived in Kabul to inaugurate Iran's first executive industrial and commercial exhibition in Afghanistan.

May 29: A team of U.S. investigators arrived in Kabul to investigate the deadly shooting on May 21 in which U.S. Marines guarding the American Embassy killed three Afghan soldiers.

=== June ===
June 1: In Kandahar, attackers hurled a hand grenade at the office of the German Technical Cooperation, shattering three windows but causing no injuries.

- Several hundred ISAF peacekeepers in Kabul held a memorial ceremony for a German soldier killed by a landmine on May 29.
- In Kabul, Afghan Minister of State Shirbaz Hakimi welcomed the establishment of an Iran Khodro representative office.
- In Kandahar, an explosion damaged the home of Ahmad Wali Karzai, a brother of President Karzai, but there were no casualties.

June 2: Governor Ismail Khan of Herat province, handed $20 million of customs revenues to Afghan coffers, the largest contribution in 18 months. Khan's payment allowed the Afghan government to pay about 100,000 Afghan soldiers their full salaries.

- In Arghasan, a district of Kandahar province, Afghan troops killed four suspected Taliban fighters and captured five others in a gun battle. The dead included Mullah Abdullah.
- Near a U.S. military base at Spin Boldak, fighting occurred between the soldiers of Afghan commanders Abdul Raziq and Gud Fahida. One of the Afghan soldier's killed, Sakhi Dad, also was a part-time translator for the U.S. Army.
- One Afghan soldier died and 14 were wounded in a vehicle convoy accident near Kandahar.
- Five Afghan soldiers were injured in a road accident in Gardez.
- A convoy of four fuel trucks was ambushed en route to the U.S. base at Orgun-e in Paktia province.
- In Tehran, representatives of Iran, Uzbekistan and Afghanistan signed a draft agreement establishing a road link from Iran to Central Asia via Afghanistan and Uzbekistan.

June 3: Afghan General Abdul Rashid Dostum backed out of a deal to move from his province to Kabul.

- A U.S. army AH-64 Apache helicopter crashed while supporting combat operations near Orgun-e in Paktika province, but there were no casualties.
- The Asian Development Bank approved a $150 million concessional loan to help Afghanistan restore damaged roads, power generation and natural gas infrastructures.
- Eight Pakistani public and private sector banks applied for licences to operate in Afghanistan.
- Following an Afghan government re-evaluation of the administrative structure of some ministries, the Women's Affairs Ministry fired 112 women because they were either completely unqualified or possessed mere vocational skills. Those with needlework, embroidery, and tailoring skills were dismissed because the ministry did not have the capacity to place them according to their professions. A spokeswoman stressed that the ministry was still employing over 1,300 women at its headquarters and its 27 provincial branches.
- Swiss Skies AG announced that it would begin flights from Washington, D.C., to Kabul, via Geneva on July 14. Later this was indefinitely delayed for security reasons.

June 4: President Karzai flew to London, United Kingdom.

- In the Shahi Kot region of Afghanistan near the Pakistani border, U.S. and Italian troops arrested 21 al-Qaida and Taliban suspects.
- Russia offered to support NATO's peacekeeping mission in Afghanistan. It was unclear how Russia's support would manifest itself. NATO was due to take command of the 5,200-member U.N. International Security Assistance Force on August 11.
- Pakistani officials in Karachi authorized Port Qasim and Karachi Port to act as an entry point for transit trade to Afghanistan.
- A homemade bomb exploded near a U.S. special operations convoy about a half mile from the U.S. military base in Gardez. No casualties were reported.
- A rebuilt girls' school in Maidan Province southwest of Kabul was burned down. It was the sixth girls' school in Afghanistan to be torched by arsonists since the fall of the Taliban.
- Afghan troops attacked suspected Taliban in Nimakai, Populzai and Hassanzai north of Spin Boldak. The a fierce gunbattle left at least 49 rebel fighters and seven government soldiers dead. Afghan officials sent more than 20 corpses over the border to Pakistan, insisting they were not Afghans. But Pakistan refused to accept them, saying they were not Pakistanis and warning that the Afghan refusal to take back the bodies could spark tension in the border region.

June 5: President Karzai met with British Prime Minister Tony Blair to discuss reconstruction efforts in Afghanistan, then with British Defence Secretary Geoff Hoon. Hoon promised that Britain would not abandon Afghanistan.

- As part of Environment and Water Day, the United Nations Environment Programme in Afghanistan announced that a majority of the nation was experiencing water scarcity. It was estimated that only 20% of Afghans nationwide had access to safe drinking water in both cities and rural areas.
- Afghan authorities sent 21 corpses said to be Taliban killed while fighting Afghan government troops near Kandahar on June 3 and June 4, to the Killi Faizo Afghan refugee camp. Pakistani authorities at Chaman handed back 14 bodies to the Afghan officials. The seven were identified as officials of former Taliban regime, including Commander Abdul Rahim, Commander Abdul Ghani, Talib Amir Muhammad, Gul Muhammad, Gullalai, Noorullah and one man whose identity was unconfirmed.
- In Paktia Province, U.S. forces killed one guerrilla and captured another after seeing a group of them open fire on a crowd of civilians.
- Said to be the "worst in living memory", sandstorms that lasted more than two months began in Lash wa Juwayn and Shib Koh Districts of Farah Province, Afghanistan, affecting more than 12,000 people in 57 villages. Villages and canals were buried, crops destroyed, water contaminated, and livestock were threatened.

June 6: President Karzai met with Elizabeth II at Windsor Castle, where he was awarded an honorary knighthood by the Queen. Karzai later gave a lecture on reconstruction in Afghanistan at St Antony's College, Oxford.

- Taliban leader Hafiz Abdul Rahim stated that only eight rebel fighters were killed in the June 4 battle north of Spin Boldak, not 40 as claimed by the Afghan government. He said the others who died were civilians.
- In Tokyo, Japan, Frank Polman, a senior Asian Development Bank official, stated that contributions by international donors to the Afghanistan Reconstruction Trust Fund had fallen far short of the pledges made because international attention had shifted focused to Iraq. Although donors pledged $5.1 billion at a meeting in January 2002 to cover reconstruction efforts through June 2004, only a small proportion of their pledges had actually been committed.
- The World Bank approved a $US60 million grant to improve the health of Afghan women and children. A project to develop basic health services and ensure women and children access to them was to be implemented over three years by the Afghan Ministry of Health. It was estimated that a quarter of Afghan children did not survive beyond their fifth birthday.

June 7: In Kabul, a taxi packed with explosives rammed a bus carrying German ISAF personnel, killing four soldiers and wounding 29 others; one Afghan bystander was killed and 10 Afghan bystanders were wounded. The 33 peacekeepers, after months on duty in Kabul, were en route to the Kabul International Airport for their flight home to Germany.

- The Afghan Constitution Commission set up offices in all 32 Afghan provinces to gather public comments and recommendations on a draft of the new constitution, which had been worked out by a special drafting committee. Similar offices were scheduled to also be set up in Iran and Pakistan to get opinions on the future constitution from Afghan refugees.

June 8: Bacha Khan Zadran, a regional Afghan warlord, said U.S. forces detained his son, Abdul Wali, in an operation in Paktia Province June 5 and called for his immediate release. Zadran said Wali had approached the U.S. forces to offer assistance. It was unclear why he was taken into custody.

- To prepare the ground for imports and exports of Iran-Afghan carpets, the first ever Iran-Afghanistan joint carpet exhibition began in Kabul.
- German police arrived in Kabul to help with the investigation over the June 7 suicide bombing.

June 9: The UN urged the Afghan government to take drastic steps to make the Afghan National Army and the Afghan Defense Ministry reflect better the nation's ethnic make-up.

- In Zabul Province, pamphlets surfaced that called on the Afghan National Army and police to fight against President Karzai and U.S.-led forces. The rhetoric also warned that those who failed to join sides with the Taliban against President Karzai would be killed.
- The Swiss parliament agreed to send Swiss soldiers to Afghanistan to work with the ISAF.
- The Arman-e-Millie daily newspaper reported that, in the Panjwaye District of Kandahar Province, a bomb exploded in a vehicle, killing its three passengers. The report did not say when the explosion occurred.
- Pakistan summoned Afghan ambassador Naunguyalai Tarzi to complain about the June 5 dumping of 22 corpses of suspected Taliban on its side of the border. Pakistani spokesman Masood Khan termed the action "provocative."
- Four rocket grenades exploded near an Afghan military border checkpoint near the U.S. base in Shkin, in Paktika Province. There were no casualties.
- U.S. special forces found three Blowpipe surface-to-air portable missile systems near Asadabad. The systems were still in their original containers.

June 10: Hundreds of ISAF personnel gathered in Kabul for a memorial service to honor the four German killed in the June 7 suicide bombing. The remains were then transported home to Germany.

- U.S.-led coalition troops killed four fighters armed with rifles and rocket grenades near the U.S. base in Shkin, in Paktika Province near the border with Pakistan.

June 11: South of Mazari Sharif, in the Sholgara District, forces from the Jamiat-e-Islami party of Ustad Atta Mohammadclashed with those loyal to Uzbek warlord General Abdul Rashid Dostum, killing at least two civilians.

- North of Terin Kot in Uruzgan Province, at least nine Pashtun Sunni Muslims were killed in an ambush.
- Six Afghans were killed and five injured when gunmen attacked a civilian bus that was en route from Nawmishvillage to Sartighan village in the Baghran District of Helmand Province.
- After completing an 8-day visit to Afghanistan, CARE secretary-general Denis Caillaux met with U.N. leadership, including Deputy Secretary-General Louise Frechette. Caillaux recommended that ISAF be increased to serve all Afghan provinces and that the U.N. increase efforts to enlarge and improve the Afghan National Army and Afghan police forces. To date, CARE had over 700 aid workers in Afghanistan, most of whom are Afghan nationals. CARE began work in Afghanistan in 1961.

June 12: The International Crisis Group (ICG) issued a report critiquing the constitutional process in Afghanistan. The report suggests that the process is hurried and covert. Public consultations, which started June 7, were due to last just under two months. Culminating in Loya Jirga in October, the process was to end with a general election in mid-2004. However, the ICG claimed that ordinary Afghans would be denied freedom of speech by local leaders and that the UN was ignoring public education on the issues.

- ISAF personnel and Kabul police defused a remote-control bomb planted on a busy road.
- The Afghan government announced that security force of 700 men would be deployed along a 540-km highway construction route.
- A man on a motorcycle threw a hand grenade into the office of an Italian aid organization in Lashkar Gah.

June 13: In the yard of an aid agency in Lashkarga, Helmand Province, a car exploded.

- A grenade attack in the Gerishk District of Helmand Province, wounded six local government soldiers.
- Deutsche Welle and Cap Anamur initiated the 100 Classrooms program in Afghanistan.

June 14: Three rockets were fired at the U.S. base in Asadabad. There was no damage and no casualties.

- In London, the ACC awarded to the Afghanistan Cricket Federation associate membership of the Asian Cricket Council.

June 15: Seven Afghan governmental drug control officers were killed and three others wounded in Oruzgan province when they were on a mission to eradicate opium poppy cultivation.

- President Karzai selected Vice President Hedayat Arsala to head the Afghan Independent Reform of Civil Administrative Services Commission to fight corruption, nepotism and bureaucratic delays.

June 16: Women's Edge co-founder and executive director Ritu Sharma arrived in Afghanistan for a week's visit. She planned to observe and monitor the conditions of women. Sima Wali, the CEO of Refugee Women in Development, accompanied Sharma.

- Leaflets in Spin Boldak allegedly written by Taliban fighters threatened to launch suicide attacks against U.S. and British troops.
- In Paris, France, a three-day Unesco conference began to discuss the future of the Kabul Museum and the possibility of restoring the site of the Buddhas of Bamiyan.
- The UNHCR and the governments of Iran and Afghanistan signed an agreement to help repatriate Afghan refugees from Iran to Afghanistan.

June 17: The UN warned all UN personnel in Afghanistan of further suicide bombings in Kabul over the next few days.

- In Kabul, a bomb was found in front of the home of Afghan Defense Minister Mohammad Qasim Fahim.
- After a daylong open discussion, during which representatives of more than 30 countries took the floor, the United Nations Security Council endorsed efforts in Afghanistan to quell lawlessness, with a particular emphasis on curbing the illicit drug trade. In an open letter, eighty agencies warned the Security Council that the situation outside Kabul was so bad that many civilians felt life under Taliban rule would be better.
- The first meeting of a tripartite commission involving Afghanistan, Pakistan and the U.S. took place in Islamabad, Pakistan. Senior military and diplomatic officials from each nation attended. The meeting dealt mainly with how and where the commission would operate. Further meetings were set either monthly or bimonthly in Islamabad or Kabul.
- The Asian Development Bank agreed to give a loan of $50 million to the Afghan Water and Power Ministry. The loan would be spent over the next three years on projects for the production, distribution and transmission of electricity in Afghanistan.
- The International Rescue Committee urged the UN and NATO to expand the International Security Assistance Force beyond Kabul.

June 18: President Karzai left Kabul for a state visit to Iran, where he was expected to sign two trilateral agreements on transit road projects between Iran, Afghanistan, Uzbekistan and Tajikistan. Afghan Foreign MinisterAbdullah Abdullah, Finance Minister Ashraf Ghani and other cabinet member accompanied Karzai on the trip. Included in Karzai's agenda were meetings with Mohammad Khatami, Ayatollah Ali Khamenei, and Foreign Minister Kamal Kharrazi.

- The Afghan Information Ministry shut down the weekly publication Aftab because it questioned Islam and the Qur'an in an article titled "Holy Fascism." The article said there had been no progress in the Islamic world for 1,400 years. Copies of Aftab were confiscated and its chief editor Sayed Mahdawi and his deputy Ali Riza Payam were arrested.

June 19: In Uruzgan province, U.S. Special Operations Forces took 15 people into custody after the group attacked a compound on the Helmand River. There were no casualties during the assault or the arrests.

- Interior Minister of Pakistan Faisal Saleh Hayat announced that Adil al-Jazeeri, a key al-Qaeda suspect, was detained after the interrogation of Abu Naseem, who was arrested earlier.
- The UN and Afghanistan's Independent Human Rights Commission expressed concern about the arrests of two Afghan journalists for articles they published in their magazine Afteb.

June 20: In Islamabad, Pakistan during Refugee Day celebrations, UN High Commissioner for Refugees spokesman Jack Reddenreported that "some 156,000 Afghan refugees from Pakistan and about 100,000 from Iran [had] returned to Afghanistan since January." The UNHCR estimates that 1.8 million Afghans returned home in 2002.

June 21: Chief of general staff of the French Army General Bernard Thorette arrived in Kabul on a three-day visit to hold talks with the International Security Assistance Force and to plan for the arrival of French special forces in the coming weeks.

- An Afghan man under U.S.-led coalition control died from unknown causes in a U.S.-managed holding facility nearAsadabad, in Kunar province. The man was seized during operations on June 18.
- Syed Ishay Ghalani, chairman of the National Solidarity Movement of Afghanistan, was nominated by the party as its presidential candidate for the Afghan general election expected to be held June 2004.
- Three explosions took place in Konduz province, the first at the residence of the provincial governor and the other two near a building housing coalition forces.
- While in France for a medical check-up, former Afghan king Mohammed Zahir Shah broke his femur by slipping in a bathroom. Rumors of his death followed both in Afghanistan and Pakistan.
- Abdul Wali died while in custody at a prison in Konar province. CIA contractor David Passaro became a suspect in the death.

June 22: The U.N. envoy to Afghanistan, Lakhdar Brahimi, called for the immediate release of two journalists arrested June 18 on charges of defaming Islam. The Afghan Supreme Court planned to put the two journalists on trial.

- Security forces raided the home of an Afghan refugee in the Kurram tribal area of Pakistan along the Afghan border and seized 21 Russian-made missiles. No arrest was made and the Afghan refugee fled into Afghanistan.

June 23: Officials in Kandahar Province arrested Mullah Nasim, a significant figure in the former Taliban intelligence service, whom they believed was planning an attack on a dwelling in Kandahar housing U.S. troops. He was allegedly near the former home of Mullah Omar. He was also allegedly on a motorbike with three missiles and other equipment.

- Troops from Pakistan, the U.S. and Afghanistan began a mission (Operation Unified Resolve) hunting Taliban and al-Qaeda fighters along Afghanistan's eastern border with Pakistan. Over 500 troops, mostly from the U.S. 82nd Airborne Division, began hunting the Taliban and al-Qaeda fighters in the provinces of Nangarhar and Kunar on Afghanistan's eastern border. The operation was especially focused on the city of Jalalabad, located on the main route between the Afghan capital Kabul and Pakistan city of Peshawar.
- Canadian Defense Minister John McCallum arrived in Kabul for a two-day visit. He was scheduled to meet with President Karzai, Defense Minister Mohammad Qasim Fahim and the International Security Assistance Force.
- In a released audio tape, Mullah Omar announced the formation of a 10-man leadership council to organize resistance against the U.S.-led coalition in Afghanistan.
- As part of Operation Unified Resolve Pakistani troops focused on securing passes on the border with Afghanistan. One Pakistani soldier was killed and another wounded in an exchange of fire with some resisting tribesmen.

June 25: U.S.-led troops were attacked near Gardez, the capital of Paktia province, injuring two U.S. soldiers and killing U.S. Navy Petty Officer 1st Class Thomas Retzer.

- Two Afghan soldiers were killed in an ambush close to a U.S. military base in Afghanistan.
- An Afghan government soldier was wounded in a three-hour battle in Maruf District, about 110 miles northeast of Kandahar.
- By the order of President Karzai, authorities released Mir Hussein Mehdavi, chief editor of Aftaab, and his Iranian deputy Ali Riza Payam, who were detained for allegedly defaming Islam. Chief JusticeMawlavi Fazal Hadi said the two men have not been acquitted or pardoned, and will be summoned to court to answer the allegations.
- A large fire burned down a large commercial storehouse near downtown Kabul, about three kilometers south of the presidential palace. The fire caused US$10 million of damage in various goods, including food supplies, carpets, hardware and electronic appliance.
- About 2.5 miles from the U.S. base near Spin Boldak, at least two Afghan soldiers were killed and one wounded when their vehicle was ambushed by militants armed with rockets and heavy machineguns.
- President Karzai left Kabul on official one-day visits to Poland, Switzerland and France. In Warsaw, he was to meet President Aleksander Kwaśniewski and Prime Minister Leszek Miller. Accompanying him were Foreign Minister Abdullah Abdullah, Reconstruction Minister, Dr. Amin Farhang, and National Security Advisor, Dr.Zalmai Rassoul.
- The United Nations Office on Drugs and Crime reported that Afghanistan made up 76% of the world opium market, compared to 12% before the fall of the Taliban government in late 2001.

June 26: Under a project funded by the French government, Afghanistan opened four public telekiosks to introduce a new Internet project to help Afghans learn computer skills and get online.

June 27: Clashes erupted between a Tajik faction and an Uzbek faction in three villages in Samangan province, Afghanistan.

- In Paris, France, French President Jacques Chirac met with President Karzai.
- Standard Chartered applied for a license from the Central Bank of Afghanistan and hoped to become the first international bank with a branch in Afghanistan. The Kabul branch was to open in September.
- Insurgents attacked U.S. troops in Paktika province near a U.S. base in Shkin, sparking a gunbattle in which U.S. helicopters were called in for strikes.
- In the Barai Ghar mountains in Zabul province, Afghan soldiers came under attack, sparking a gun battle in which one Taliban commander, Mullah Shaheed, was killed and two guerrillas were wounded.

June 28: A U.S. Army soldier died when his vehicle flipped over near a U.S. base in Orgun in Paktika province.

June 29: In Prague, the International Olympic Committee lifted the competition suspension on Afghanistan, clearing the way for Afghanistan to compete in the 2004 Summer Olympics. Afghanistan was cleared to compete in amateur wrestling, boxing, taekwondo, and track and field.

- A Pakistani delegation of construction industry representatives in the Pakistani Export Promotion Bureau left for Kabul, for a four-day visit to explore the future of steel, bricks and kiln, cement, pipe and other relative industries.
- Afghanistan Cricket Federation president Allah Dad Noorie met his Indian counterpart Jagmohan Dalmiya and was assured complete support for rebuilding cricket facilities in Afghanistan.

June 30: The United States Air Force announced that F-16 fighter pilot Maj. Harry Schmidt would face a court-martial for dereliction of duty for his part in bombing Canadian troops in Afghanistan on April 17, 2002.

- In Kabul, British Foreign Secretary Jack Straw met with Abdullah Abdullah to discuss security issues.
- The Niswan Girls' School opened in Gardez in Paktia province for some 800 students. The school was funded with help from a $12,000 grant from the U.S. military.
- During evening prayers, a remote-control bomb exploded in a mosque in Kandahar, wounding 17 people.
- Pakistani troops, patrolling a village along the Afghan-Pakistan border, came under fire from Afghan rebels.
- Afghan Interior Minister Ali Ahmad Jalali that Iran was ready to help the Afghan government construct a number of police stations on the Iran-Afghanistan joint border in order to curb the illicit trade in drugs as well as protect border security forces.

=== July ===
July 1: Phase one of the Afghan Disarmament, Demobilization and Reintegration Program was scheduled to begin, but was delayed because Afghan authorities were slow to make crucial defense ministry reforms. The goal of phase one was to disarm 100,000 former combatants and integrate them into civilian live.

- An Indian consulate opened in Herat province, Afghanistan.
- In a video message on a compact disc received by the Associated Press, Gulbuddin Hekmatyar urged his followers to rally together and drive all U.S. and foreign troops from Afghanistan.
- British Foreign Secretary Jack Straw visited Kandahar, Afghanistan and met with governor Gul Agha Sherzai.
- Fifteen (9 miles) east of Kabul, an unknown man was killed because a bomb he was carrying went off prematurely. The blast left a 2 m (6.6 ft) wide crater.
- In Zabul Province along the Afghanistan-Pakistan border, three rebel fighters and six Afghan government soldiers were killed in fighting.

July 2: About 700 Afghan government reinforcements were the Ata Ghar Mountains of Afghanistan where about 60 rebel fighters had been battling government forces for four days.

- An Afghan military officer, Commander Basir, was shot dead by two unknown gunmen in Herat.
- Some 800 U.S. soldiers backed by more than 500 Italian paratroopers launched Operation Haven Denial into Khost Province and Paktika Province. The operation was aimed at preventing the re-emergence of terrorism and denying sanctuary to anti-coalition fighters in the region.

July 3: In Mazar, four civilians and two fighters were killed in a battle between Uzbek and Tajikforces.

- At the Kabul Military Training Center, two U.S. special forces soldiers were wounded in an accidentalgrenade blast. They were successfully treated at Bagram.
- Near Kabul, Afghanistan, U.S. special forces seized three weapons caches that included dozens of anti-tank rockets, grenades, mortars and landmines.
- About 60 rebel fighters managed to slip out of the Ata Ghar Mountains in Zabul Province, Afghanistan, and moved into neighbouring Kandahar Province. Ten rebels were killed and 16 wounded in the fighting.

July 4: Rockets were fired at a road construction crew in southern Afghanistan.

- South of Ghazni, three rebels carjacked a vehicle of an NGO.
- Afghan police arrested a person in connection with the bombing of a mosque in Kandahar on June 30.
- Turkmenistan assured Pakistan and Afghanistan that Daulatabad, the fifth largest gas field in the world, would remain exclusively available for the Trans-Afghan Pipeline.
- Near Mazari Sharif, Afghanistan, two people were killed and one wounded in a battle between Uzbek and Tajik forces.
- Three Dutch peacekeepers were wounded in Kabul when their vehicle was hit by an explosion while they were on patrol.

July 5: The Japanese ambassador to Afghanistan, Kinichi Komano, announced that Japan would provide $150 million in aid for reconstruction purposes, such as roads, health centers, radio and TV.

- Sheikh Hamdan bin Zayed Al Nahyan, Minister of State for Foreign Affairs for the United Arab Emirates received Zalamy Rasoul, Afghan National Security Advisor.

July 6: An advance team of NATO troops arrived in Kabul to prepare for its takeover of the International Security Assistance Force in August.

- In the Dara-i-Suf District of Samangan Province, three people were killed in fighting between Uzbek and Tajik forces. A multi-party peace commission and U.N. officials brokered a cease-fire.
- [President Karzai sent a high level delegation to eastern Afghanistan to investigate alleged border violations by the Pakistani military. The Mohmand tribe were worried about Pakistan's military operations in the Nangarhar and Kunar districts.

July 7: The Afghan government announced that it had collected $56 million in revenue from provincial governors and warlords since the end of March.

- John Abizaid replaced Tommy Franks as head of the US Central Command.
- About 100 people took part in a demonstration in Kabul, in protest against reported Pakistani military incursions into Afghan territory.
- New Zealand Minister of Defense Mark Burton announced the deployment of New Zealand service men and women on a twelve-month mission to Afghanistan. Their responsibilities would focus on enhancing the security environment and promoting reconstruction efforts.
- The Afghanistan Literature House opened in Tehran, Iran in the Honar Cultural Center.

July 8: In a second day of demonstrations against reported Pakistani military incursions into Afghan territory, a group of nearly 500 people attacked Pakistan's embassy in Kabul. The windows of eight embassy cars were smashed while televisions, computers and windows were also smashed, including those in the ambassador's upstairs office.

- In Mazari Sharif around 500 people held a protest outside the United Nations offices and burned a Pakistani flag and an effigy of Musharraf.
- In reaction to attack on Pakistan's embassy in Kabul early in the day, Pakistan lodged a formal protest with the Afghan Government. The protest prompted President Karzai to telephone Pakistan President General Pervez Musharraf directly.
- Amnesty International secretary general Irene Khan met with president Hamid Karzai in Kabul to press for widespread prison reform and improved security. A new Amnesty International report found that warlords were still operating private prisons, with many civilians held in shackles and detained for months without trial.

July 9: German Defense Minister Peter Struck told the Berliner Zeitung that Germany would extend its troops' mandate in Afghanistan until at least the end of 2004.

- The United Nations High Commissioner for Refugees announced that 243,396 Afghan refugees had returned to their homeland from various parts of the world since January 2003.
- Heavy rains over the last three days triggered floods in Paktia Province, Paktika Province, Khost Province and Logar Province, killing as many as 24 people and washing away sunbaked mud homes.
- In Kabul, local police in riot gear protected the Pakistan Embassy and blocked off nearby streets.
- The Asian Development Bank announced that Afghanistan, Pakistan and Turkmenistan needed more studies carried out before proceeding with their $2.5 billion- trans-Afghan gas pipeline project.

July 10: Afghan authorities in Kandahar Province arrested a man and seized a large quantity of bomb-making material. The man was reported to be a brother and aide of former Taliban defense minister Mullah Obaidullah.

- William B. Taylor, Jr. was named by the Bush administration to oversee U.S. policy toward Afghanistan.

July 11: Pakistan declined to accept a U.N. offer to mediate any differences between them and Afghanistan after their embassy was attacked by protesters earlier in the week. Security around the Afghan consulate in Peshawar was tightened.

- A U.S. Special Operation Forces convoy north of Bari Kott in Khost Province received small-arms fire. One soldier was slightly injured from bumping his head in a vehicle.
- U.S. Special Operation Forces came under small-arms fire from unknown gunmen in Kunduz, Afghanistan.

July 12: Four attackers ambushed a police patrol south of Kandahar.

- Two Afghan soldiers were wounded in a skirmish with Pakistani troops along Afghanistan's eastern border with Pakistan. Residents of two nearby villages were prompted to flee their homes.
- A bomb exploded near a movie theater in south-eastern Afghanistan. There were no casualties.
- Afghan Defense Minister Mohammad Qasim Fahim met Russian President Vladimir Putin in Moscow. Putin reaffirmed the need for stability in Afghanistan and pledged further aid to Kabul.
- A rocket landed near the perimeter of Bagram air base, but there were no casualties or damage.
- A blast hit a United Nations refugee transit center in Jalalabad, but there were injuries.

July 13: A blast damaged a building operated by a non-governmental organization (NGO) for the U.N.

- An improvised explosive device left a large hole in the wall of a warehouse run by the German Technical Cooperation, an NGO, in the northern section of Jalalabad.
- In a raid near the Pakistan border, Afghan forces seized about 300 rocket-propelled grenades, dozens of anti-tank mines and 20 AK-47 rifles.

July 14: Afghan Foreign Minister Abdullah Abdullah met with U.S. Secretary of State Colin Powell in Washington, D.C.

- Insurgents in four pickup trucks attacked a police station to the northwest of Kandahar, Afghanistan. Five officers were killed in the 30-minute clash.
- An improvised explosive device disabled a coalition vehicle near the U.S. embassy in Kabul. No one was injured.
- Near a border post in Yegobi District of Nangarhar Province, armed clashes between Afghanistan and Pakistan lasted for about one hour.
- Following an investigation by Scotland Yard's anti-terrorist branch, Zardad Khan was arrested in London.

July 15: The United Nations High Commission for Refugees reported that about 8,000 Afghans had been moved to other camps in Pakistan, while about 11,000 had been sent to a camp near Kandhar. The refugees had been living in a makeshift camp in the south-western Pakistani border town of Chaman since February 2002.

- Afghan police officer Sayed Nabi Siddiqui was detained by U.S. forces after he reported police corruption and was then accused of being a member of the Taliban.

July 16: In the Ghorak District of Kandahar, more than 400 Afghan soldiers and police searched houses for Taliban suspected of killing five policemen earlier in the week. Twelve villagers were picked up on suspicion of helping the Taliban.

- Indian Oil Corporation and GAIL submitted bids for construction of a $2.5 billionTurkmenistan-Afghanistan-Pakistan pipeline, which will move natural gas (Trans-Afghanistan Pipeline) from Turkmenistan's Dauletabad gas field via Afghanistan to Pakistan's Multan.
- Lorne Craner, the U.S. assistant secretary of state for human rights, began a three-day visit to Afghanistan.

July 17: President Karzai issued a decree to convene a 500-member loya jirga on October 1, 2003, that would approve a draft of the country's new constitution. Karzai said that 450 members would be elected and 50 would be appointed.

- The Afghan government paid Pakistan 2.8 million Afghanis (the equivalent of three millionrupees) in compensation for the armed attack on the Pakistan embassy in Kabul July 8. The payment was delivered in cash.
- Canadian troops took control of the Kabul Multinational Brigade (KMNB) of the International Security Assistance Force in Kabul. Brig. Gen. Peter Devlin assumed command from Germany's Brig. Gen. Werner Freers during a ceremony in eastern Kabul. At the time, the KMNB was made up of around 3,000 soldiers.
- The United Nations Population Fund and the government of Italy inaugurated the rebuilt Khair Khana hospital in Kabul, that would provide pregnant women clean and safe conditions for childbirth.
- Pakistani border security forces arrested 48 Afghans for illegally crossing into Pakistan near Chaman. The Afghans were then turned over to the Afghan government.
- Sixteen Afghan prisoners from Camp X-Ray in Guantanamo Bay arrived by plane at the Bagram Air Base in Afghanistan. The released Afghan prisoners were not allowed to talk to journalists.

July 18: Eight Afghan government soldiers, in a car travelling about 25 kilometers east of Khost, were killed by a remote-control mine. The soldiers were part of a special unit working with the U.S.-led coalition forces to monitor the regions that border Pakistan.

- Afghanistan was officially reinstated as a full member of the International Association of Athletic Federations. Afghanistan had originally joined the IAAF in 1930. Following the lead of the International Olympic Committee, the IAAF suspended Afghanistan in 1999 because of the Taliban ban on the participation of women athletes. The IOC lifted its suspension on June 29.
- Three U.S. soldiers were wounded when their vehicle was hit by an improvised explosive device detonated in the middle of their convoy approximately eight kilometers south of Asad Abad, Afghanistan.

July 19: North of Orgun, Afghanistan, two soldiers from the U.S.-led coalition forces were wounded when their patrol was ambushed by automatic rifles and rocket-propelled grenades.

- One man was killed and another wounded when they set off a land mine while digging a well near a police station in Chilstoon, Kabul. The mine was likely left over from factional fighting in the 1990s.
- Sixteen Afghans who arrived in Kabul from Camp X-Ray, Guantánamo Bay on July 17 were freed and handed over to the International Committee of the Red Cross.
- Afghan authorities confiscated hundreds of copies of the weekly newspaper Payam-e-Mujahid, owned by the Afghan Northern Alliance, after it published an article accusing President Karzai of making the apology under pressure from a U.S. ambassador and described it as a dishonor for Afghans. The article demanded that Karzai resign. The confiscation was ordered by Defense Minister Mohammad Qasim Fahim.
- U.S.-led coalition forces killed up to two dozen insurgents in a clash near Spin Boldak.
- Several Afghan troops were killed as dozens of heavily armed rebel fighters attacked a border post near Spin Boldak. After the five-hour battle, the insurgents escaped across the border into Pakistan.

July 21: The Pakistani embassy in Kabul reopened after having been ransacked by angry crowds on July 8.

- The International Red Cross and Red Crescent Movement announced that the network of 50 health clinics in Afghanistan were in danger of severe cutbacks due to a lack of money. To date, the Red Cross had only received about one-fourth of the $10 million which it had requested.
- About 100 Canadian troops (the first of 1,800) arrived in Kabul, Afghanistan to serve with the ISAF.

July 22: A fire (which started in a timber shop after a wood-sawing machine overheated) in Jalalabad, destroyed more than a hundred shops and other buildings.

- Rockets landed near U.S.-coalition bases in Kandahar Province and Paktika Province. There were no coalition casualties.
- A patrol of U.S. soldiers was ambushed in Asadabad province. There were no casualties.

July 23: In the Zormat Valley region of the southern Paktia Province in Afghanistan, about 1,000 soldiers of the Afghan National Army, together with U.S.-led coalition troops, were deployed in Operation Warrior Sweep. It marked first major combat operation for the Afghan troops.

- In Islamabad, Pakistan, Afghan Interior Minister Ali Ahmad Jalali met Pakistani Interior Minister Faisal Saleh Hayat and Prime Minister Zafarullah Khan Jamali on the first day of a two-day visit. The visit was aimed at developing cooperation in the fight against terrorism and to remove recent strains in relations. An agreement was made for Pakistan to train Afghan border security agencies and members of the Afghan police force.
- After two rockets landed near a U.S. base at Asadabad, Afghanistan, coalition troops called in air strikes by a B-52 Stratofortress (which dropped Joint Direct Attack Munitions) and two AV-8 Harrier IIs (which dropped Precision-guided munitions.)

July 24: In Kabul, Afghanistan, U.S. General John Abizaid President Karzai.

- More than 200 Afghan refugees in Brussels began a hunger strike in Sainte-Croix Church. They said they would rather die than go back to a country they considered too dangerous.

July 25: Six Afghan policemen were wounded, two seriously, when their vehicle hit a land mine about 50 km (31 mi) east of Kandahar.

- Near Kandahar, an Afghan soldier was wounded by a landmine while chasing rebels who fired a rocket at a government post.
- Zardad Khan made his first court appearance in London, England.

July 26: Under a pilot telekiosk project funded by France, the telekiosk.moc.gov.af website was launched in Afghanistan. In both Dari and English language, the site provided links to government and health information, job listings and business information. The site also provided community forums, information on local hotels and restaurants, and a Dari-English phrasebook.

- Mullah Mohammed Omar approved Mullah Abdul Samad as the new deputy military commander for southern Afghanistan and ordered him to intensify guerrilla attacks on U.S. and coalition forces.

July 27: Telecom Development Company Afghanistan began offering wireless phone service to consumers in Afghanistan, breaking a year-long monopoly held by Afghan Wireless Communication.

- The Taliban named Mullah Abdul Jabar as the rival governor in Zabul Province, Afghanistan.
- In Spin Boldak, Afghanistan, posters appeared that threatened death to twenty-five informers accused of collaborating with U.S. and government forces.
- A ground-breaking ceremony took place in Tehran, Iran to mark the start of construction of a four-kilometer Milak-Zaranj road. Iran allocated US$849,847 for the project. Iran's Hossein Amini and Afghanistan's Karim Barahouei attended the ceremony.

July 28: The United States State Department warned U.S. citizens in Afghanistan that the security environment in the country was "volatile and unpredictable."

July 29: The UNHCR announced that, with its support, more than 300,000 Afghan refugees had returned home in 2003.

- Human Rights Watch released a report that, in Afghanistan, U.S.-led coalition support for warlords was destabilizing the nation and could threaten the elections of 2004. Abuses carried out by the Afghan National Army and local police were also highlighted, including kidnappings, burglaries, rapes, intimidation, harassment of journalists, and extortions.
- During a United Nations Security Council debate, Indian Ambassador Vijay K. Nambiar expressed concern that, through charities and drug trade, al Qaeda still had the ability to finance its own activities. He also voiced concerns that al Qaeda continued to procure weapons through the border with Pakistan. Nambiar demanded an inquiry.
- In Naish, 40 miles (64 km) north of Kandahar, Afghanistan, about two dozen insurgents ambushed government troops, killing at least two soldiers and torching two NGO vehicles before fleeing.
- To sort out their border dispute along the tribal region dividing them, Pakistan and Afghanistan agreed to use, with the assistance of the U.S., GPS to work out the coordinates of the border.
- Britain deported to Afghanistan a group of forty-seven Afghans who failed to obtain political asylum in the UK.

July 30: U.S. General Richard Myers, chairman of the Joint Chiefs of Staff, said in an interview that the largest threat to Afghanistan's new government comes from across the border of Pakistan.

- In Nakhohni, five miles (8.0 km) south of Kandahar, two gunmen on a motorcycle shot and killed Mullah Jinab, a member of the Ulema Shoora, as he was coming out of a local mosque after evening prayers.

July 31: The European Union announced that it would donate €79.5 million for reconstruction efforts in Afghanistan. The money is meant to support de-mining, the building of a health system, and other public infrastructure projects.

- The United Nations Food and Agriculture Organization predicted that the 2003 wheat harvest in Afghanistan would be the largest in 20 years, due to increased rainfall, increased international aid, and continued success in dealing with locusts. Malnutrition remains a serious problem in the country, however.
- In Kabul, three Afghan National Army officers were wounded when U.S. forces fired on their taxi.
- U.S. forces killed at least three suspected insurgents in a firefight near the U.S. base in Asadabad, Afghanistan.
- The Pakistani army moved into parts of its northwest tribal areas to flush out Taliban remnants. This marked the first time Pakistan had taken such action.
- Floods in the Panjshir Valley triggered a landslide which killed 30 people and swept away 400 cattle.
- United Nations Secretary General Kofi Annan urged the United Nations Security Council to expand the mandate of the International Security Assistance Force to other key Afghan cities in order to create a better environment for the elections slated in the summer of 2004.
- After a gun battle south of Kandahar, Afghanistan, Afghan security forces killed one suspected Taliban member and arrested five others.

=== August ===
August 1: Afghan] Education Minister Yunis Qanooni and Herat province governor Ismail Khan in separate announcements denied Human Rights Watch allegations that they and other Afghan leaders were involved in human rights abuses.

- In response to a July 29 rebel ambush that killed at least two Afghan soldiers, roughly 500 Afghan troops backed by U.S.-led forces and helicopters entered the Tora Ghar District east of Sha Wali Khot, 10 km (6.2 mi) north of Kandahar. The operation against an estimated 100 rebels netted three Taliban commanders, Mullah Abdul Hakim, Mullah Abdul Hamid and Mullah Abdul Zahir.

August 2: Afghan Deputy Defense Minister Abdul Rashid Dostam launched a drive to disarm thousands of his militiamen in Jawzjan province. Around 1,000 of his fighters were disarmed. The disarmed men were to be sent to Kabul to join the Afghan National Army.

August 3: UN special envoy for Afghanistan, Lakhdar Brahimi, met for the first time with the six-member Afghan electoral commission. Atop the goals of the commission is to register millions of potential voters. To date, free elections had never been held in Afghanistan.

- U.S. bases in Paktika province and Kandahar province came under rocket attacks, but there were no casualties.

August 4: The Bakhtar News Agency reported that Zabihullah Zahid, a deputy education minister for the former Taliban regime, had recently been arrested in Balkh province.

- Thirteen Afghan militiamen were killed and twenty-one were injured when a truck loaded with 800 rifles, light machine guns, tank rounds and other ammunition exploded in Aqcha District, Jawzjan province.
- In Nangarhar province, a demining vehicle, from the Mine Clearance Planning Agency, was shot at twice, but there were no casualties.
- In Miranshah, Pakistan, authorities arrested Haji Jamil, an Afghan former mujahideen commander loyal to Gulbuddin Hekmatyar.

August 5: Alcatel, a French telecommunications equipment maker that was providing the GSM network for Kabul, won a contract to supply a complete GSM mobile network solution to Afghanistan.

- A press conference in Islamabad, Pakistan held by Pakistani Finance Minister Shaukat Aziz and Afghan Finance Minister Dr. Ashraf Ghani marked the end of a three-day Joint Economic Commission between their countries. The ministers announced that Pakistan pledged to remove six more items from its negative list of exportable items, to reduce railway and port charges, and to simplify custom procedures. The two countries also agreed to enhance bilateral air-traffic, open bank branches of each other, and start railway traffic between Chamman and Kandahar.
- At the Afghan Ministry of Women's Affairs in Kabul, thirty Afghan women graduated from a business-training course run by the Afghan Women's Business Center. The teachers had been trained in the U.S. and Kabul. The program was run by the smallNGO Freedom Medicine and funded by the United States State Department.

August 6: The first civilian passenger aircraft since the Soviet invasion of Afghanistan to fly non-stop from Europe to Afghanistan landed in Kabul. The German airline LTU thus began a regular schedule by which an Airbus 330-200 would leave Düsseldorf each Tuesday evening and arrive in Kabul Wednesday morning after a 6½-hour flight.

- In a press conference in Peshawar, Pakistan, the chairman of the Afghan Organization of Human Rights and Environmental Protection, Abdul Rehman Hotaki, revealed that 495 Pakistani POWs remained in Afghanistan since end of Talibanrule. Most of the POWs were overcrowded in unhygienic conditions in the Shibarghan jail, and not treated in accordance with the Geneva Convention. He also asserted that some warlords had Pakistani captives in private jails.
- Four Afghan government soldiers were wounded in an attack on a government 70 km (43 mi) from Kandahar.

August 7: Six Afghan soldiers and a driver for Mercy Corps were killed in a gunbattle as they were guarding the government center of Deshu district in southern Helmand province.

- Fifteen miles (24 km) north of Spin Boldak, in Kandahar province, Taliban forces attacked with rockets a government vehicle, killing five Afghan government soldiers and wounding three.
- The United Nations Office on Drugs and Crime released a report that concluded there were, in Kabul at least 24,000 hashish users, nearly 11,000 opium users and 7,000 heroin users and roughly 7,000 alcohol imbibers.
- Canadian Forces bought four French-built unmanned aerial vehicles (called Sperwers) for use in its deployment to Afghanistan. The $33.8-million contract was awarded to Oerlikon-Contraves Corporation, of St-Jean-sur-Richelieu, Quebec.
- In Balkh province, a rocket hit a parked vehicle belonging to the Halo Trust, a British demining agency, but broke in half on impact and did not explode.

August 8: Insurgents fired two rockets at a U.S. base in Asadabad, in eastern Kunar province, but there were no reports of casualties or damage.

August 10: The United Nations suspended missions in parts of southern Afghanistan after a series of attacks on NGOs.

- In Asadabad, a rocket landed about 400 metres (yards) from the United Nations High Commissioner for Refugees.
- The Islamic Development Bank agreed to provide $4.7 million in financial aid to Afghanistan to set up a women's hostel for Kabul University.

August 11: In a ceremony at the recently refurbished Amani High School, NATO took charge of the International Security Assistance Force from Germany and the Netherlands.

- In Paktika province, U.S. military planes, called in by U.S. ground troops patrolling the border, opened fire on what were believed to be attackers fleeing towards the border, killing two Pakistani guards and wounding a third.
- Asian Cricket Council development officer Iqbal Sikander, also representing the International Cricket Council, met Afghanistan to discuss development of cricket in Afghanistan.
- Leaflets, containing a death threat against all Afghans who supported the U.S., were distributed near Spin Boldak and Pakistan's southern town of Chaman.

August 12: President Karzai vowed to execute Taliban guerillas involved in the murder of pro-Afghan-government clerics.

- A report issued by the United Nations stated that Afghanistan had re-emerged as the world's leading source for opium and heroin. The report estimated that 500,000 people were involved in Afghanistan's trafficking chain and estimated an annual income at $25 billion.
- In northeastern Kunar province, rebels fired two 107 mm rockets at a U.S. coalition base in Asadabad. There were no casualties.

August 13: President Karzai decreed that officials could no longer hold both military and civil posts. The move stripped Ismail Khan of his post as military commander of western Afghanistan.

- Lakhdar Brahimi, the head of the U.N. mission in Afghanistan, urged the Security Council to expand peacekeeping forces across the country.
- A bomb exploded on a bus in Helmand province, killing at least 17 people including eight children.
- U.S.-led coalition forces in Khost province, killed 16 insurgents. Five border guards died.
- In Uruzgan province, at least 25 people died after fighting broke out between supporters of Amanullah, the former ruler of the remote district of Kajran, and his successor, Abdul Rahman Khan.
- In western Kabul, two men were killed when a bomb they were making went off, leaving twisted wreckage of two small cars strewn across their walled compound. A man who survived the explosion later told police they were constructing car bombs to attack "the slaves of the United Nations and the foreign invaders."
- Eight suspected Taliban were killed after they attacked Afghan border forces in southeastern Khost province. Two others, who were not Afghans, were arrested.
- In a meeting at Bagram Air Base, Afghanistan, Afghan National Security Adviser Zalmay Rasul, Pakistani Maj. Gen.Ashfaq Parvez Kayani and U.S. Maj. Gen. John Vines agreed to establish a hotline to step up communications between the three nations.

August 14: Southwest of Kabul, two aid workers from the Afghan Red Crescent Society were killed and three others injured when five armed men on two motorcycles fired on their convoy.

- After a rocket was fired near one of its compounds on August 10, the United Nations High Commissioner for Refugees announced that it was suspending operations in Kunar Province.
- The Afghan Ministry of Health began chemically treating thousands of shallow wells in Kabul.

August 15: The United Nations announced that it and the Afghan government approved a $7.6 million project to register voters for national elections in 2004. A board of six Afghans and five international members was to oversee the registration of an estimated 10.5 million people over 18.

- More than 1,600 soldiers Canadian soldiers arrived in Afghanistan to start their tour of duty at Camp Julien, outside Kabul.

August 16: In a ceremony at the governor's residence in Kandahar, Gul Agha Sherzai handed gubernatorial power to Yusuf Pashtun. The change in power occurred in response to President Hamid Karzai's decree of August 13 that officials could no longer hold both military and civil posts. Sherzai became a federal minister of urban affairs.

- General Baz Mohammed Ahmadi was appointed as the new corps commander for Herat. He had previously been commander of the Rushkhar military barracks in southern Kabul.
- In Barmal, Paktika province, fifteen insurgents and seven Afghan government soldiers were killed in a clash.

August 17: Over 200 insurgents crossed the border from Pakistan and overran the police station in Barmal District, Paktika province, killing eight officers. Afghan security forces killed 15 of the attackers, who later fled the area.

- A large group of insurgents set fire to a police station at Tarway, Paktika province. Four officers were captured by the attackers, who retreated to Pakistan.
- In the northern town of Balkh, Jawzjan province, two Afghan workers for the Save the Children Fund were injured when armed men opened fire on their vehicle.

August 18: Three Afghan government soldiers were killed in an attack in Paktika province.

- Twelve suspected Taliban insurgents ambushed and killed nine policemen near Kharwar in Logar province.
- In Wardak province, 20 armed men stormed a compound belonging to the Mine Dog Center. The attackers beat five employees with rifle butts, fired a rocket-propelled grenade at one of their vehicles and set a mine-clearing ambulance on fire. Police later arrested eight suspects.
- About a dozen Canadian specialists, Led by Col. Mark Hodgson, visited three Kabul-area villages (Qalae Bakhtiar Khan, Qalae Muslim, Qalae Badur Khan) largely ignored by the hundreds of aid organization.

August 19: Armed men attacked a locally run landmine detection center in central Afghanistan, beating up Afghan staff and torching an ambulance.

- Low-key celebrations took place in Afghanistan to mark Afghan Independence Day. The holiday commemorates the day in 1919 when the UK gave up control of Afghanistan.
- In Kandahar, An explosion occurred in the house of Ahmed Wali Karzai, brother of President Karzai. The government said the explosion was caused accidentally when some weapons were being moved. One man was injured.
- Attackers fired three rockets at a coalition base in Asadabad, Kunar province. There was no damage.
- A bomb exploded near coalition troops on patrol at Bari Kowt, in Kunar province.
- Nine policemen were killed in Logar province, Afghanistan.

August 20: In Jalalabad, the first Afghan National Army recruitment center opened.

- In Afghanistan, a U.S. special operations service member died as a result of injuries received during operations in the vicinity of Orgun, Paktika Province.
- A U.S. soldier was slightly wounded by a bomb while on patrol near the U.S. base at Shkin, Paktika Province.
- At least three Afghan civilians were hurt when a U.S. military helicopter fired on their car, near Urgun District, Paktika Province.
- In Uruzgan province, Afghanistan, at least 20 people were killed and 25 others wounded in fighting between rival militias.
- Opponents of the Afghan government torched the coed Abu-Sofyaan School in Musai district, Logar province. The attackers warned the girls studying at the school not to return.

August 21: In raids in Uruzgan province, Afghan security forces captured six Taliban fighters, including two local commanders. Rocket launchers, rifles and grenades were found during the raid.

- Over a two-day period in Kabul, Afghanistan, Pakistan Foreign Minister Khurshid Kasuri met separately with Afghan Foreign Minister Abdullah Abdullah, President Hamid Karzai and Defense Minister Mohammed Fahim. Among other things, they agreed to increase number of flights between their nations. The Afghan government raised no objection with 640 Pakistani prisoners being released by Afghanistan, but U.S. authorities still had not investigated them for any links to terrorist groups.
- U.S. and Afghan forces destroyed three heroin factories in Nangarhar province.

August 22: Pakistan released forty-one men who had fought for the Taliban. Authorities had determined the men did not have ties to terrorist groups.

- Two Afghan soldiers and four rebel fighters were killed in a clash involving a group of 250 to 300 suspected Taliban fighters in Uruzgan province. Nine suspected Taliban members were captured along with documents, assault rifles, shoulder-held rocket launchers and ammunition.

August 23: Five Afghan government soldiers were killed in an ambush in Zabul province. At least three rebel fighters were killed in the battle that followed.

August 24: Antonio Maria Costa, the head of the United Nations Office on Drugs and Crime arrived in Afghanistan to inspect the work of his Office.

August 25: In the Dozi area of the Dai Chopan district, Zabul province, a joint Afghan-U.S. military operation, which involved F-16s and A-10s, killed over a dozen rebel fighters. The incident was part of Operation Warrior Sweep.

August 26: In Zabul province, U.S. bombing raids killed an estimated 20 suspected Taliban fighters.

- Alexander Mikhailov, deputy head of Russia's drug control committee, stated that heroin from Afghanistan was sweeping through Russia.
- A two-day meeting in Kabul between among Afghan, Pakistan and UNHCR authorities began to discuss the fate of the Afghan refugees. In the meetings it was agreed that four refugee camps near the border would close down, and repatriation of some 50,000 Afghans would take place. Two of the camps were in the Chaman area of Balochistan and two camps were in Shalman on the Khyber Pass.

August 27: A group of insurgents attacked U.S.-led coalition forces near the village of Shkin, Paktika province.

- German Chancellor Gerhard Schröder's Security Cabinet approved sending a possible 250 troops to the Kunduz province of Afghanistan to help maintain order and aid civilian relief organizations. However, the decision required parliamentary approval.

August 28: In Zabul province, U.S. fighter jets and helicopters bombed suspected Taliban hideouts. One U.S. soldier was wounded in related clashes in the Tangi Chinaran area of Dai Chopan district that left up to 40 insurgents dead.

- British SIS Agent Colin Berry is released from captivity after negotiations between the British and Afghan Governments finally meets a head. Berry had been held since 25 February 2003. Throughout this time he had been 'moved' from location to location following questioning by the Afghan Ministry of Interior Secret Police. Berry reported that during his detention he had been routinely tortured or beaten during questioning by his captors. These allegations were confirmed by a British FCO Consulate by way of photographs taken after one such occasion where Berry had been repeatedly whipped with a metal cable. Berry stated that the line of questioning throughout his captivity had been centered on the concerns of his captors and the intelligence agencies knowledge of their activities. Berry was never officially detained and his captivity was always described as routine whilst helping enquiries. General Jellali stated that 'Mr Berry was our guest'. Berry was moved around by night and 'off the radar screen' for 7 months.
- Farooq Wardak, director of the Afghan Constitutional Commission, announced that they would postpone adopting a new constitution by two months, delaying the adoption until the end of December 2003.

August 29: Three Afghan government soldiers were killed and one Afghan commander, Haji Wali Shah, was kidnapped by rebels near the Spin Boldak. Four rebels were wounded, but escaped.

- U.S.-led forces came under fire in the Dai Chopan district of Zabul province. Eight suspected Taliban fighters were captured and at least twelve were killed. A U.S. special operations soldier died in an accidental fall during a nighttime assault.
- An Afghan presidential palace vault was opened for the first time in an estimated 15 years revealing Afghanistan's 2,000-year-old Tillya Tepe Bactrian gold treasures.
- Pakistan detained 26 suspected Taliban members in a raid on an Islamic seminary near its border with Afghanistan.

August 30: Afghan soldiers swarmed over remote mountain peaks in an ongoing battle with suspected Taliban holdouts, killing and capturing several enemy fighters.

- In a new offensive dubbed Operation Mountain Viper, U.S. planes launched a second night of bombing in the Dai Chopan area of Zabul province.
- Pakistan announced that it had set up 23 new check-posts over a 60 kilometer region along the Durand Line border with Afghanistan.
- A grenade was thrown at the Indian consulate in Jalalabad. No one was injured in the explosion.
- U.S.-led troops launched a new offensive against suspected Taliban forces in Zabul province.

August 31: Two U.S. troops were killed and three were wounded in a clash with rebel fighters in Paktia Province. Four insurgents were also killed in the 90-minute firefight.

- In Zabul province, U.S. warplanes and helicopters continued to bomb suspected Taliban hideouts in the mountains of the Dai Chopan region.
- A large group of suspected Taliban fighters raided an Afghan government checkpoint along a highway to Kabul, killing four policemen and taking two captive.
- In the Shajoi region of Zabul province, a police checkpoint near a camp for Indian and Afghan highway workers were attacked by armed men on motorcycles. Six of the sleeping guards were killed, several others were kidnapped and two vehicles were incinerated by rockets and gunfire.
- In Uruzgan province, Afghan soldiers and three suspected Taliban fighters died in a clash.
- In Kabul, Commander Qalam of Gulbuddin Hekmatyar's Hezb-i-Islami faction was arrested in a raid along with four colleagues

=== September ===
September 1: Four Afghan policemen were killed, four were wounded and four were missing after a raid on their checkpoint 115 miles northeast of Kandahar, Zabul province. Indian contractors working for the Louis Berger Group came under small-arms fire in nearby a guest house. Two of the company's security guards were shot dead when assailants opened fire on their vehicle.

- The Taliban mounted a surprise attack behind U.S. and Afghan army lines, killing at least eight Afghan soldiers and slightly wounding General Sayf Allah. One U.S. soldier died when his parachute failed to open.

September 2: The Germany cabinet agreed to extending its peacekeeping mission in Afghanistan beyond Kabul, if the UN voted to expand the ISAF mandate there.

- Pakistani and Afghan officials announced that Pakistan had agreed to train 800 Afghan policemen in three Pakistani training centers. Pakistan would also provide stipends to the Afghan police cadets during their training.
- In the Muhammad Agha district of Logar province, the coed Moghul Khil Elementary School was set on fire, destroying two rooms and two tents. Leaflets were scattered that said girls should not be allowed in the classroom, threatening teachers who taught girls. Classes resumed the next day.
- Five rockets were fired at the U.S. base in Gardez; there was no damage or injuries.

September 3: In the Sar Murghab area of Uruzgan province, a remote-controlled bomb killed senior Afghan military commander Mullah Gul Akhund along with his bodyguard. A third person in their car was seriously wounded.

- In the Nava district near Asadabad, Kunar province, Afghan authorities seized 100 anti-tank mines, mortar shells and remote control bombs.

September 4: The United Nations Commission on Human Rights criticized Kabul police for forcibly evicting 30 families in Shir Purvillage near the up-market Wazir Akbar Khan District of central Kabul by bulldozing their homes. Both the United Nations and the Afghan Independent Human Rights Commission appealed to authorities to suspend the operation until an alternative could be offered. The families had lived there for 30 years.

September 5: In Kabul, Canadian Foreign Affairs Minister Bill Graham met with President Karzai and Foreign Minister Abdullah Abdullah. Graham also opened the Canadian Embassy in Kabul (which had been closed since 1979) and signed an agreement lowering duties on textiles, such as Afghan rugs.

- Afghan troops patrolling the Mezana District of Zabul province, captured five Taliban rebels, including a top Taliban commander, Mulla Abdul Salaam.

September 7: In Washington, D.C., U.S., President George W. Bush announced he would ask the United States Congress for an additional $87 billion for U.S. efforts in Iraq and Afghanistan. Just $800 million was earmarked for Afghan reconstruction.

- Rebels attacked Afghan government troops in Kighai Gorge, Kandahar province, killing five soldiers dead and wounding five others.

September 8: U.S. Defense Secretary Donald Rumsfeld visited Afghanistan and met with President Karzai.

- President Karzai signed a decree postponing for two months from October to December the loya jirga set to approve the newconstitution.
- Five Afghan soldiers in a convoy were killed in an attack by suspected Taliban rebels in Kandahar province.
- Two US soldiers were injured in exchanges of fire in Paktika province and Kunar province.
- In Ghazni province, four Afghan citizens were killed and one injured in their pick-up truck when they were stopped by rebels, then tied up and then shot. The citizens were employees of the Danish Committee for Aid to Afghan Refugees, and were part of a water supply project in the area.
- The interim Afghan cabinet approved a law allowing political parties to form.
- Pakistan suspended the transportation of Indian cargo through Pakistani territory to Afghanistan, particularly equipment meant for the Afghan National Army.

September 9: Over 10,000 Afghan citizens filled Kabul sports stadiums to honor the anniversary of the 2001 assassination of Ahmed Shah Massoud. President Karzai spoke to crowds.

- The U.S. Embassy in Kabul alerted U.S. citizens to avoid public places. A ban on unofficial travel within the capital was maintained.

September 10: A joint meeting between officials of Pakistan, Afghanistan and the U.S. was held at the checkpost of Friendship Gate in the border town of Chaman, Afghanistan. It was decided that the neighboring nations would deploy more troops at their border.

September 11: In east Kabul, a rocket exploded in the International Security Assistance Force base, Camp Warehouse, causing some damage but no casualties.

- In southwest Kabul, an explosion shook an ISAF base used by Canadian troops.
- The International Boxing Association offered Afghanistan provisional affiliation. Boxing had been banned during the Taliban rule.

September 12: Miloon Kothari, appointed by the United Nations Commission on Human Rights to investigate housing rights in Afghanistan, announced that Defence Minister Mohammad Qasim Fahim and Education Minister Yunus Qanooni were illegally occupying land and should be removed from their posts. However, on September 15, Kothari sent a letter to Lakhdar Brahimi, the head of the U.N.in Afghanistan, saying he had gone too far in naming the ministers.

- Two explosions took place near Kabul International Airport, closing the airport for two hours.

September 13: Iran and Afghanistan signed a memorandum of understanding on customs cooperation. The Head of Iran's Custom AdministrationMasoud Karbasian and the Head of Afghanistan's Custom Administration Gholam Jilani Pupel signed the document.

- In the Taftan area, Pakistani border security forces arrested around 100 Afghans who crossed into Pakistan from Iran.

September 14: Afghan Commerce Minister Sayed Mustafa Kazemi announced the approval of 5,000 investment projects worth $4.5 billion, expecting to employ more than 400,000 people.

- In Maruf district, Kandahar province, fifteen Taliban insurgents were killed by U.S.-led coalition forces, including Mullah Hafiz Abdul Rahim. Taliban leader Abdur Rahman was captured and interrogated. FiveAfghan National Army troops were wounded, two of them seriously.

September 15: In Paktia province, a dozen Taliban members stopped vehicles on the highway and threatened to cut off the noses and ears of men who shave their beards or anyone caught listening to music.

- In the Chaman area of Afghanistan, an Afghan National Army major crossed into Pakistan carrying an AK-47. He was arrested by Pakistani border guards.

September 19: Near the Bagram Air Base at least six people were killed in two blasts at the home of an explosives trader. A boy was killed by shrapnel when a rocket exploded after the main blast. Six to 10 people were injured in the second explosion.

- Near Khost, while trying to defuse a rocket aimed at the town, an Afghan National Army soldier was killed and another severely wounded.
- Near the Bagram Air Base north of Kabul, six people were killed in an accidental blast at an explosives-filled house.
- Nine were killed in an accidental blast at an explosives dealer's house in Mehtarlam, Laghman province.

September 20: President Karzai announced new political appointments to the defence ministry. Eight appointments were given to members of the Pashtun majority, including the deputy ministerial position to Major General Farooq Wardak who replaced General Bismullah Khan. Five Tajiks, four Hazaras, two Uzbeks, one Baluchi and one Nuristani were also named to new positions.

September 23: President George W. Bush addressed the United Nations General Assembly regarding Afghanistan.

- Near Shkin in Paktika province, eight rockets landed near the U.S. base
- In Kunar province, two rockets landed near a U.S. base.

September 24: In New York, President Karzai addressed the United Nations General Assembly. He called for a wider international military presence in Afghanistan and an extension of ISAF beyond Kabul. German Chancellor Gerhard Schröder told the General Assembly that, in order for Afghanistan's political reform effort to succeed, it needed sustained international support. Karzai later met privately with President George W. Bush.

- President George W. Bush announced that Zalmay Khalilzad, his special envoy in Afghanistan, would also be the new U.S. ambassador in Kabul.
- In the Ozikhushk area of Helmand province, armed men opened fire on the vehicle carrying three Afghan workers for the Voluntary Association for the Rehabilitation of Afghanistan, killing an engineer for a local aid group and wounding his driver.

September 26: Near Gardez in Paktia province, rebels attacked with a bomb and small arm fire a U.S.-led convoy on an overnight patrol. There were no casualties on either side

- NATO Secretary General George Robertson announced that Canada would take over command of ISAF in February 2004.
- Mullah Abdul Razzaq Nafees, a member of the 10-strong Taliban shura formed in June, was killed in a clash with U.S.-led coalition and Afghan in Uruzgan province.

September 27: In Ottawa, Canada, President Karzai met with Prime Minister Jean Chrétien. Reports surfaced that Canada would take over ISAF command in 2004, but Chrétien said Canada would not send any more troops to Afghanistan until its current 12-month peacekeeping mission was over.

- In Badakhshan province, eight men were arrested on suspicion of smuggling boys. Afghan authorities said they had rescued 85 boys who had been abducted. They were being smuggled into Iran and into Pakistan. Children abducted in the region were sold as sex slaves or child laborers.
- NATO Secretary General George Robertson arrived in Kabul to visit ISAF peacekeepers. He also met with Afghan Defense Minister Mohammad Qasim Fahim, Interior MinisterAli Ahmad Jalali and United Nations officials.
- In the Mir Mundo area of Helmand province, Afghanistan, rebels killed seven bodyguards of Helmand Governor Sher Mohammed Akhundzada.
- In the village of Shaga, Nangarhar province, arsonists burned down a coed secondary school.
- Rebels fired two rockets at the U.S. base in Shkin, Paktika province.

September 28: In Kapisa province, Kabul police found an 18-pound bomb, a radio filled with explosives and two remote-control detonation devices disguised as mobile phones. Two people arrested.

- Rebels fired six rockets at the U.S. base in Shkin, Paktika province.

September 29: In Shkin, Paktika province, a U.S. soldier was killed and two others wounded in a gun battle which also left two rebel fighters dead.

September 30: Afghan Central Bank governor Anwar Ul-Haq Ahadi announced that Afghans should use their own Afghanicurrency in daily transactions rather than U.S. dollars or Pakistani rupees.

=== October ===
October 1: President Karzai spoke as a guest at a Labour party conference in Bournemouth, England.

- In Nish, Afghanistan ten Afghan National Army soldiers and two children were killed in their vehicles when they were ambushed by 16 rebels in two vehicles. In the same area, four rebels were killed by helicopter gunships.

October 2: In Kabul, two Canadian peacekeepers (Sgt. Robert Short and Cpl. Robbie Beerenfenger) were killed and three were injured by a landmine.

- Afghan security forces arrested five suspected al-Qaeda operatives, four Afghan and one Pakistani. It was alleged that the suspects came from Pakistan where they were trained at an al-Qaeda camp.

October 3: U.S. Deputy Secretary of State Richard Armitage visited Kabuland Kandahar to discuss the U.S.-led war on terrorism.

- In the Urgan district of Paktika province, rebels ambushed two fuel trucks supplying the U.S.-led coalition and beheaded two people and kidnapped the remaining four.
- In Dara-e-Noor, north Kandahar, a pickup truck carrying Afghan Army soldiers came under fire from over a dozen rebel fighters. Ten government soldiers and two children were killed.

October 4: Near the Bagram Air Base north of Kabul, at least six people were killed and seven others injured in a massive explosion caused by people dismantling a cluster bomb.

- In Jawzjan province, fighting broke out between two factions and spread to the south and west of Mazari Sharif.
- In Puli Khumri, Baghlan province, an improvised explosive device was discovered 25 metres from the UNHCR office. The device was disabled by the Halo Trust.

October 5: President Karzai suggested publicly that he would seek the presidency in the June 2004 elections.

October 7: ISAF peacekeepers and Afghan police arrested Abu Bakr on suspicions of planning terrorist attacks and killing two Canadian soldiers on October 2.

- The U.S. envoy to Afghanistan, Zalmay Khalilzad, visited Kabul.
- In Kabul, Abu Bakr was arrested for the October 2 bombing that killed two Canadian soldiers.

October 8: Afghan Central Bank governor Anwar Ul-Haq Ahadi decreed that all prices in the Afghan marketplace would be specified in Afghanis.

- Clashes west of Mazari Sharif, between Atta Mohammad's Tajik Jamiat faction and Abdul Rashid Dostum's Uzbek Junbish faction killed and wounded more than fifty people.
- In Kabul, the Afghan Defense Ministry, the UN and Japan signed an agreement to demobilize 100,000 factional fighters.
- The World Bank approved a $US22 million loan to extend Afghanistan's phone and postal networks.
- The National Bank of Pakistan became the first foreign bank to open in Afghanistan since 1979. Standard Chartered Bank and First Micro Finance Bank had licenses to open, but had not yet done so.

October 9: Afghan Interior Minister Ali Ahmed Jalali flew from Kabul to Mazari Sharif to oversee a truce signed between Abdul Rashid Dostum and Atta Mohammad.

October 10: About 40 prisoners including Taliban members escaped through a tunnel at the jail in Kandahar. The escape led to the suspension of the prison superintendent a few days later. It was alleged that the prisoners paid bribes of $80,000. It was not immediately known where the earth was removed to create the 30-metre tunnel.

October 11: The governing council of Nangarhar province banned a Pashto language newspaper (named Khabrona) published in Peshawar, Pakistan because of its pro-Taliban stance.

- President Karzai approved a $200 million Japanese-led project aimed at disarming and demobilizing militiamen in Kunduz province. The program hoped to start on October 24.
- President Karzai approved a law barring judges, prosecutors, armed forces leaders, officers, non-commissioned officers, other military personnel, police officers, and personnel of national security from being members of a political party during their term of office.

October 12: In Zabul province, eight policemen were killed when around 100 insurgents attacked government offices. District offices were torched and four vehicles destroyed.

- In Chaar Chino district, Uruzgan province, rebels killed four Afghan Army soldiers when they ambushed their pick-up truck.

October 13: The United Nations Security Council voted unanimously to expand the ISAF mission beyond Kabul.

- About 300 Kabul policemen took up positions in Mazari Sharif to help maintain a truce between Abdul Rashid Dostum and Atta Mohammad.
- In Kabul, several hundred former Afghan military personnel officers held their third demonstration in a month to protest their dismissal. They demanded reinstatement and lost pay.
- In the Chaar Cheno district, Uruzgan province, hundreds of Afghan troops backed by U.S. soldiers and helicopters attacked a suspected Taliban hideout, killing at least four rebels and capturing eight others. One Afghan Army soldier was killed and five others were wounded.
- In Zabul province, gunmen ambushed a vehicle carrying two U.S. citizens, but no injuries were reported.
- At a wedding in Shab Koh, Farah province, three were killed and four injured because of an armed clash between two government security officers.

October 14: In the Bakwa district of Farah province, unknown gunmen wearing uniforms of government security forces opened fire on travelers along a highway, killing seven people and injuring two others. The gunmen robbed the travelers.

October 15: Afghan forces fought suspected Taliban forces in central Afghanistan.

October 16: U.S. Commerce Secretary Don Evans visited some sites in Kabul. While visiting a girls' school he relayed a message to the schoolgirls from President George W. Bush that "We care about you and we love you." Evans then put his arm around a female teacher, a faux pas in the conservative Muslim state.

- In the Char Cheno district, Uruzgan province, U.S.-led coalition troops completed a two-day battle with suspected Taliban rebels. Two Afghan National Army soldiers and six rebels died in the fighting.

October 18: On a road linking Khost province with Gardez province, a group of 50 Taliban whipped drivers without beards, confiscated music cassettes from vehicles and passengers, and distributed pamphlets warning of harsh penalties.

October 19: While visiting Kabul, Canadian Prime Minister Jean Chrétien said that Canadian troops would not be sent beyond Kabul, despite United Nations Security Council plans to expand peacekeeping operations.

- Near the U.S. base at Deh Rawud, Uruzgan province, U.S. special forces soldiers and Afghan National Army soldiers captured Mullah Janan, a Taliban commander thought responsible for rocket attacks on a base in southern Afghanistan.

October 20: Outside a UN office in Kabul, hundreds of dismissed Afghan military personnel and army officers protested, demanding back jobs and income lost during reforms of the Defense Ministry. The reforms were aimed at making the ministry more ethnically balanced, to encourage opposition factions to lay down their arms to bring peace to the nation. To date, 20,000 of 50,000 scheduled had already been dismissed since the beginning of 2003.

- In Helmand province, two Afghan military intelligence agents were killed and three others wounded when their pickup truck hit a [landmine.
- In Kunar province, a bomb blew up a pickup truck killing four people.
- Over forty Afghan children, mostly from Baghlan province, who were illegally trafficked to Saudi Arabia over recent years, were repatriated to Kabul. They would reside in an orphanage run by the Afghan Social Affairs Ministry until their families could be located.
- In Kabul, the MMRD and the Embassy of Japan hosted an Ogata Initiative workshop to define goals for the next phase of the Initiative.

October 21: The Afghan government confirmed that former Taliban Foreign Minister Wakil Ahmad Mutawakil had been released from U.S. custody at Bagram Air Base. Taliban leadership promptly denounced Mutawakil.

- Pakistani border security force arrested Afghan Commander Nizamuddin and two soldiers who had crossed into Pakistan illegally.
- Pakistan began constructing a 40 kilometer wall along the Afghan border without seeking permission from the government of President Karzai.

October 22: In the first three days of a demilitarization program in Kunduz, more than 600 Afghan militiamen surrendered their weapons to the government.

- The Afghan Supreme Court called on the United Kingdom to extradite Zardad Faryadi. Deputy Chief Justice Fazl Ahmad Manawi stated that Faryadi should be tried in Afghanistan.

October 23: Rebels fired rockets at a pickup truck ferrying passengers to Haibak in Samangan province, killing 10 people, including two children.

- In Kabul, British minister for international trade Mike O'Brien and Afghan Commerce MinisterSayed Mustafa Kazimi signed a trade agreement to strengthen bilateral business ties and to improve the international market for Afghan products.

October 24: Germany's Bundestag voted to send German troops to Kunduz, Afghanistan. The deployment marked the first time that ISAF soldiers operated outside of Kabul.

- Taliban members distributed pamphlets in Laghman province, threatened death to Afghan women working for NGOs and to Afghan drivers carrying foreigners and their belongings on highways.
- About 1,000 Afghan Army soldiers, backed by more than a hundred U.S.-led coalition troops, tanks, and jets, swept through parts of Zabul province hunting for rebel forces. Sixteen suspected Taliban fighters were captured.
- The Afghan Disarmament, Demobilization and Reintegration Program project was launched in Kunduz. In the program, demobilized combatants would receive a one-time incentive food package of wheat, pulses, vegetable oil and iodised salt.

October 25: In Khost province, two classrooms of a co-ed school were completely destroyed by an explosion.

- In the Gomal District of Paktika province, U.S. led coalition troops killed 18 rebel fighters in a six-hour firefight, calling in A-10 Thunderbolt airplanes and Apache helicopters to help combat the attackers. Two CIA agents, William "Chief" Carlson and Christopher Mueller, were killed in a related ambush.
- Afghan, Pakistani and U.S. diplomats and military officials participated in a joint visit to the Afghan-Pakistani border to ascertain where the disputed boundary should lie.

October 26: During a visit to Mazari Sharif, Balkh province, Afghan interior minister Ali Ahmad Jalali appointed a new provincial governor, deputy governor, mayor and police chief. The shake-up was an attempt to quell growing ethnic tensions in the area. In one of the more controversial appointments, the former police chief of Kandahar (Mohammed Akram, an ethnic Pashtun) was named the chief in Mazari Sharif.

- Afghan citizens, including Afghan Women's Affairs Minister Habiba Surabi expressed outrage at Miss Earth contestant Vida Samadzai for donning a red bikini on stage in Manila.

October 27: In attempts to prevent the movement of foreign terrorists into Pakistan, the Pakistan army established over 100 check-posts along the border with Afghanistan, and established a system of intelligence, patrols, and inspections in the tribal areas.

- Rebels ambushed a U.S. convoy near Orgun-E in Paktika province, injuring three soldiers.
- In an article in Time Magazine, the U.S. base in Shkin in the Paktika province was described as: "a Wild West cavalry fort, ringed with coils of razor wire. A U.S. flag ripples above the 3-ft.-thick mud walls, and in the watchtower a guard scans the expanse of forested ridges, rising to 9,000 ft., that mark the border. When there's trouble, it usually comes from that direction."

October 28: In Geneva, the UN High Commissioner for Refugees announced that the number of Afghan refugees returning to Afghanistan from Iran has just passed 600,000 and the number returning from Pakistan had just topped 1.9 million.

- The Kuwaiti Fund for Arab Economic Development allocated US$30 million for infrastructure projects in Afghanistan.

October 29: The Afghan Supreme Court condemned Vida Samadzai competing as Miss Afghanistan at the Miss Earth beauty pageant, saying such a display of the female body goes against Islamic law and Afghan culture.

- In Kabul, a Canadian combat engineer was uninjured when his vehicle struck a landmine. He was clearing the same route where two Canadian soldiers were killed October 2.
- The French armed forces chief of staff, General Henri Bentégeat, arrived in Kabul for an official two-day visit that would including meeting with the French troops in ISAF and meeting Afghan officials such as President Karzai, former King Zahir Shah, Defence Minister Mohammad Qasim Fahim and the commander of the Afghan National Army, General Bismillah Khan.
- In Orgun of Paktika province, four U.S. special forces soldiers suffered minor wounds after their patrol was ambushed.
- Hasan Onal, a Turkish engineer, and his Afghan driver were kidnapped at gunpoint while traveling in the Shah Joy District of Zabul province. The driver was freed a day later with the kidnappers' demands, which were the release of 18 Taliban prisoners by November 2. Onal was eventually released safely on November 29.

October 30: In a small hamlet near the village of Aranj in the Waygal district of Nuristan province, six people of the same family were killed when a house was bombarded by U.S. warplanes. The house belonged to a former provincial governor, Ghulam Rabbani, who was in Kabul at the time. The raid was aimed at Gulbuddin Hekmatyar and Mullah Faqirullah, both of whom had left the area just hours before. The victims (three children, an adolescent, a young man and an old woman) were all relatives of Mullah Rabbani.

- New Zealand Prime Minister Helen Clark arrived in Kabul for a two-day visit that would include talks with President Hamid Karzai and encounters with New Zealand forces serving there. At the time New Zealand had around 100 troops serving as part of a humanitarian reconstruction team in Bamyan Province, near the site of the ancient Buddha statues which had been destroyed by the Taliban.
- Thirty-five miles west of the Deh Rawood district in Uruzgan province, rebels killed a U.S. special forces soldier and wounded an Afghan soldier.
- In Zabul province, rebels kidnapped four Afghan government officials, including the brother of MullahMohammad Zafar, commissioner of the Khak Afghan district.
- The United States House of Representatives voted 298–121 in favor of $87.5 billion war on terrorism bill. $1.2 billion of that was earmarked for Afghan reconstruction. $65 million of that was set aside for Afghan women's programs.
- Because of attacks on humanitarian workers, the United Nations temporarily suspended road missions to four provinces in southern Afghanistan, including Helmand province and Oruzgan province.
- Afghanistan launched its first FM radio channel.

October 31: In Sar-i-Pul province, fighting broke out between forces of General Abdul Rashid Dostum and Ustad Atta Mohammed, killing at least ten.

- In Helmand province, police officers opened fire on military vehicles with tinted windows that had refused to stop for a routine check. In the ensuing exchange of fire, three Afghan Army soldiers and two policemen were killed.
- Two Arabs and two Chechens in Khost province, attempting to kidnap U.S. journalists, were thwarted when the car they stopped on the road between Gardez and Khost contained only a local driver. The driver was beaten, but not killed, because he spoke Arabic.
- Two of Gulbuddin Hekmatyar's commanders, Abu Bakr and Qalam, were reported to have been arrested recently in Kabul by ISAF.
- Gulbuddin Hekmatyar and Burhanuddin Rabbani held talks in Badakhshan.

=== November ===
November 2: Beginning a week-long trip, a delegation of fifteen United Nations Security Council members arrived in Kabul from Islamabad on a German military plane equipped with anti-missile gear. The all-male delegation consisted of U.N. ambassadors from the U.S., Britain, France, Bulgaria, Mexico and Spain, of deputy ambassadors from Russia and Pakistan, and of other diplomats from Angola, Cameroon, Chile, People's Republic of China, Guinea and Syria.

November 3: The United Nations Security Council delegation that arrived in Afghanistan on November 2 visited Herat but could not meet with governor Ismail Khan because he was out of town.

- The Proposed Afghan Constitution was presented to President Karzai at a ceremony in Kabul. A constitutional loya jirga was scheduled to formally adopt the draft in December.
- Rockets were fired by rebel forces at the U.S. bases in Kunar province and Nangarhar province.
- Pakistani soldiers killed two al-Qaida suspects in a shootout near Zarray Lita, an Afghan border town.

November 5: The United Nations Security Council delegation visited Mazari Sharif and met with Tajik warlord Ustad Atta Mohammad and Uzbek warlord Abdul Rashid Dostum. The Afghan leaders pledged to end their feud.

- In Kabul, a bomb exploded near the offices of Oxfam and Save the Children.
- Pakistan announced that it would exclude vegetable ghee, cigars, shampoo, RT silk fibre, razor blades, capacitors and video cassettes from the negative list under the Afghan Transit Trade, but rejected the removal of three electronic items - refrigerators, air conditioners and televisions.

November 6: In Kabul, unidentified gunmen murdered Shireen Agha Salangi, a former commander of the Afghan Northern Alliance who later switched sides to fight alongside the Taliban.

- An Indian man was murdered by unknown gunmen in his home in the Taimani district of Kabul. The man was an employee of a private Indian firm which was working on an Afghan mobile phone project.

November 7: The United Nations Security Council delegation that arrived in Afghanistan on November 2 returned to New York.

- The United States State Department advised U.S. journalists in Afghanistan to take immediate steps to increase their personal security, after sources indicated that Taliban rebels were planning kidnappings.
- In Zabul province, rebel forces hijacked two U.N.-funded vehicles, capturing their drivers and communication equipment.
- At least eight people were killed when rebels attacked an administrative buildings in Zabul province. The Taliban also kidnapped four relatives of the district chief and threatened to kill them unless the governor surrendered the district to them.
- Three rockets landed near U.S. troops operating near the Asadabad.
- Operation Mountain Resolve began in Nuristan province and Kunar province. The objective was to destroy anti-coalition forces.

November 8: A group of rebels fired rockets at U.S.-led coalition forces in Kunar province. Coalition soldiers responded with small arms and aerial fire.

- The Taliban militia leader holding Hasan Onal (a Turkish engineer) hostage in southwestern Afghanistan demanded the release of 250 Taliban fighters by the Afghan Government. Onal had been abducted on October 28.
- The Afghan government dispatched a 12-member defence ministry delegation led by deputy chief of army of staff, Ishaq Noori, to Mazari Sharif with the two-week mission of merging the troops led by Ustad Atta Mohammad and the troops led by General Abdul Rashid Dostum.

November 9: Miss Afghanistan Vida Samadzai won the Miss Earth pageant's first "beauty for a cause" award.

November 10: U.S. soldiers killed one rebel in a clash in the Marzeh district of Nuristan province. Two or three rebels also opened fire on other U.S. forces there, then fled the scene when close air support was called in.

- Gulbuddin Hekmatyar dismissed the Afghan Transition Government as a puppet of the U.S. The statement also said that efforts to adopt the Afghan Draft Constitution were meaningless.

November 11: Five Afghan civilians were injured in a mine blast close to the Bagram Air Base.

- In Kandahar, a car bomb blew up outside a United Nations Assistance Mission in Afghanistan compound, injuring at least one person and damaging nearby buildings.
- The Asian Development Bank approved a US$1 million technical assistance grant to carry out a preparatory study of redeveloping a road connecting Herat with Andkhoy and Turkmenistan.
- Taliban forces used rockets and machineguns to attack Romanian armored personnel carriers returning to base in Kandahar province, Afghanistan, killing at least one soldier and injuring at least one.
- Outside Kandahar, Afghanistan, a U.N. de-mining vehicle belonging to an international relief agency hit an anti-tank mine, injuring two people.

November 12: A new television station, Aina ("Mirror"), started test broadcasts from Sheberghan. On air for six hours a night and covering an area of 300 kilometers, the channel planned to broadcast cultural, social, entertainment, political and sports programs in the Dari, Pashtu, Uzbek and Turkmen languages.

- In the Manogi District of Kunar Province, a car was blown up by remote-control, killing at least three Afghans and injuring three.

November 13: In Spin Boldak, unidentified men on a motorbike handed Reuters an audio cassette of Taliban leader Mullah Mohammed Omar. On it, Omar admonished commanders who have given up the jihad.

- An explosion occurred outside the small U.S.-led coalition camp in Kandahar Province. Later, a rocket fired by unidentified attackers landed near the base.

November 14: Three U.N. employees in Paktia Province escaped injury after a remote-controlled bomb blew up near a vehicle they were travelling in.

November 15: Six civilians died when a U.S. warplane dropped a bomb in the Barmal District of Paktika Province.

November 16: In Ghazni Province, two men on a motorcycle opened fire on a UNHCR vehicle, killing Bettina Goislard, a French U.N. staff member, and injuring the driver. Local police fired at the motorcycle, injuring one of the two men and arresting both of them. The two men were beaten by an angry mob before they were arrested. Taliban officials claimed responsibility and stated Goislard was killed because she was Christian.

- Pakistani border security forces arrested 60 Afghans trying to enter Pakistan illegally.

November 17: The UN suspended operations in southern and eastern Afghanistan in response to the killing of one of their employees a day earlier.

November 18: South Korea temporarily closed its embassy in Kabul amid warnings that al Qaeda might launch a suicide bomb attack. Three South Korean diplomats were evacuated to Pakistan. South Korea had 200 troops serving in Afghanistan.

- Canada delivered millions of voter registration kits to Afghanistan's electoral commission. Nationwide elections were to take place mid-2004.

November 19: Two 107-millimetre rockets attached to a car battery were discovered by Canadians in a palace near Camp Julien. The rockets were pointed toward Camp Julien, allegedly in anticipation of Canadian Defence Minister John McCallum's visit the following day.

November 20: Near Ghazni, on the Kabul to Kandahar road, gunmen kidnapped and later released an Afghan driver working with a U.N.-led de-mining operation, stealing his car, money and documents.

- At Camp Julien, Canadian Defence Minister John McCallum spoke with troops before he traveled to meet with President Karzai and Defence Minister General Fahim Khan.
- Completing a week-long sweep, Pakistani authorities arrested more than 500 illegal Afghan migrants.

November 21: In Ashgabat, Turkmenistan, Turkmenistan defeated Afghanistan 11–0 in an Asian zone preliminary World Cup qualifier.

- As part of an amnesty linked to the end of Ramadan, more than 60 suspected Taliban members and sympathisers were released from a prison in northern Afghanistan.

November 22: Armed men rob four or five U.N. staff and other patrons at the Shang Hai restaurant in Kabul.

- Rockets exploded in a garden outside the Intercontinental Hotel in Kabul, but no casualties were reported.

November 23: Near the village of Shukhi in the Kapisa province, a U.S. Sikorsky MH-53 Pave Low helicopter crashed shortly after leaving Bagram Air Base, killing five U.S. soldiers. Eight soldiers also were wounded. The troops were part of the 16th Special Operations Wing and were participating in Operation Mountain Resolve. It was later determined that the cause of the accident was engine failure.

- Two U.S.-led coalition troops were wounded when their vehicle drove over a land mine near Shkin.

November 24: In Kabul, Turkmenistan defeated Afghanistan 2–0 in an Asian zone preliminary World Cup qualifier.

- At least four Afghans were wounded when soldiers opened fire on demonstrators outside the defence ministry in Kabul. The protesters were ex-mujahideen fighters who had recently been dismissed by the ministry.
- Afghan authorities in Kabul arrested two men carrying explosives.

November 25: DHL halted its five-day-per-week delivery services to Afghanistan to carry out a security review. Service resumed November 28.

November 26: During maneuvers of Operation Mountain Resolve, U.S.-led coalition forces in Afghanistan were attacked. OneAfghan National Army soldier and two U.S. soldiers were wounded.

- Near Khost, rebel forces fired on U.S.-led coalition and Afghan soldiers. In the ensuing exchange, one rebel was wounded and several others were captured.

November 27: United States Senators Hillary Rodham Clinton and Jack Reed spent Thanksgiving in Afghanistan.

- The United Nations changed the curfew for its workers in Kabul from midnight to 10 pm.

November 28: NATO agreed to take command of PRTs in five Afghan towns that were currently protected by Operation Enduring Freedom. However, NATO added that the change of command would only take place if military resources were available. Such a move would necessitate 3,000 more troops and bases in Tajikistan or Kyrgyzstan.

- The White House Office of National Drug Control Policy released a report that estimated the area in Afghanistan used to grow poppies had risen from 4,210 acres (17.0 km^{2}) in 2001 to 76,900 acres (311 km^{2}) in 2002 and to 152,000 acres (620 km^{2}) in 2003.United Nations figures published a month earlier estimating 185,000 acres (750 km^{2}) in 2002 and 200,000 acres (810 km^{2}) in 2003.

November 29: President Karzai met John Abizaid, the head of the U.S. Central Command, in Kabul. Their agenda included the prevention of militants infiltrating from Pakistan.

- Hassan Onal, Turkish road engineer kidnapped by the Taliban on October 28, was released to tribal elders in Zabul province. A Taliban spokesman claimed Onal had been freed because the Afghan government had released two militants.
- President Karzai laid claims that fugitive Taliban leader Mullah Mohammed Omar had been seen the previous day offering prayers in Quetta, Pakistan. Pakistan quickly rejected the claim.
- U.S. Central Command chief John Abizaid visited U.S. troops in eastern Afghanistan.
- A Gulbuddin Hekmatyar commander, Ghulam Sakhee, was killed in Kunar Province.

=== December ===
December 1: A Provincial Reconstruction Team composed of over 50 U.S. troops were deployed to Herat to foster security and carry out relief projects in Herat province, Farah province, Badghis province and Ghor province.

- Amnesty International reported that the U.S. military had not fulfilled its promise to release findings from an investigation into the deaths of two Afghan prisoners, who died while in U.S. custody at Bagram Air Base, December 3 and December 10, 2002.
- Near a U.S. base at Deh Rawood in Uruzgan province, an Afghan Army soldier fighting alongside U.S. forces was killed while engaged with enemy forces.
- In Khost province, Afghan soldiers destroyed an improvised explosive device.
- U.S. troops in Shkin, Paktika province, destroyed six rockets pointed at their base.
- Voter-registration centers opened in eight Afghan cities, including Jalalabad. Elections were scheduled for June 2004.
- Renegade Afghan warlord Bacha Khan Zadran and his brother Amanullah Khan Zadran were arrested at a border checkpoint in Dirdoni, Pakistan. They were later turned over to Afghan officials February 3, 2003.

December 2: Warlords in northern Afghanistan handed over tanks and cannons to the Afghan Army. Abdul Rashid Dostumgave up just three tanks in the disarmament drive, while Ustad Atta Mohammad gave up more than 50.

December 3: An Afghan policeman, Khodai Rahim, threw a grenade at a U.S. military vehicle in a crowded market in Kandahar, injuring two U.S. soldiers, another policeman and a local bystander. One of the soldiers lost his leg. The attacker was arrested.

- Twenty former asylum seekers arrived in Kabul, (17 from Nauru) and were placed in a guesthouse organized by the Afghan Ministry for Refugees and Repatriation. Over the next ten days, they were repatriated to their homes.

December 4: In the Chakaw region of Farah province, at least one Afghan working for the U.N. Central Statistics Department was killed and 11 wounded when attackers opened fire on their convoy.

- United States Secretary of Defense Donald Rumsfeld visited Afghan regional commanders Abdul Rashid Dostum and Ustad Atta Mohammad in Mazari Sharif, and then visited President Karzai in Kabul. Rumsfeld also met, in Mazar, Colonel Dickie Davis, head of a British Provincial Reconstruction Team.
- An explosion caused by a rocket occurred in an open field about half a mile from the U.S. embassy compound in Kabul, but caused no damage or injuries.
- Rebel forces fired on a U.S.-led coalition convoy near Gardez, in Paktia province.
- Several rockets landed near the U.S.-led base in Orgun, Paktika province.
- A bomb exploded outside the compound of a district administration building in Paktika province. The wall of the compound was damaged.
- A rocket struck a school in the village of Matun in Khost province.
- A bomb damaged a bridge in the Mando Zayi District of Khost province.
- Taliban commander Hafiz Abdul Majeed said in an interview with Reuters that Taliban attacks would be stepped up in coming days and warned against attending the constitution loya jirga set for December 10.
- The U.S. military seized a large arms cache hidden in the mail jail of Kandahar.

December 5: Men burst into the office of a Turkish construction company southeast of Kabul, beat and tied up an Afghan staff member, then abducted two Turkish engineers and another Afghan. They were released December 8.

- Near Gardez in Paktia province, an air and ground attack by U.S. special forces on a compound, used by a rebel commander Mullah Jalani to store munitions, killed six children and two adults.

December 6: A bomb wounded at least 18 people in the main market in the Chawk Shida district of Kandahar. One report suggested the bomb may have been rigged to a bicycle, while another report said the bomb had been hidden inside a pressure cooker. President Hamid Karzai laid blamed the Taliban, but Taliban spokesman Mullah Abdul Samad denied any involvement, saying: "Taliban do no attack civilian targets." A later controlled explosion by U.S. troops caused additional panic in the city.

- After shopping with Afghan colleagues for chickens in Bazargan, Zabul province, two Indian workers were kidnapped by three men armed with machineguns.
- Seven boys, two girls and a 25-year-old man were killed when two U.S. A-10 Thunderbolt II planes fired rockets and bullets into a group of villagers sitting under a tree in Hutala. Mullah Wazir, the intended target, was not at home at the time. U.S. ambassador Zalmay Khalilzad stated the next day that Wazir was killed in the attack, but retracted the statement shortly after.
- The U.S. military launched its biggest ever ground operation, Operation Avalanche, across eastern and southern Afghanistan. Over 2,000 soldiers were involved, including four infantry battalions as well as soldiers from the Afghan National Army and militia.

December 7: Two Turkish workers were kidnapped as they worked on a well-digging project just outside Kabul, Afghanistan. It was reported that the incident regarded a land dispute. The workers would be released in March 2004.

- The World Food Programme and the MRRD met to improve monitoring of food assistance projects in Kunar and Laghman provinces where lack of security restricted UN movement.

December 8: Anwar Shah, a Pakistani engineer, was shot dead and another went missing, after gunmen attacked their vehicle near Muqur, Ghazni. Mullah Sabir Momin, the Taliban's deputy operations commander in southern Afghanistan, said the men were attacked because they were "American agents."

- U.S.-led and Afghan forces wounded two rebels and detained 15 in Said Karam District, Paktia Province.
- To mark the arrival of a new installment of Indian donated biscuits in Afghanistan, Afghan actor and director Hashmat Khan, Indian Ambassador Vivek Katju, Afghan Deputy Education MinisterIshraq Hussaini and the World Food Programme Country Director Susana Rico participated in a ceremony in Kabul. The shipment would provide more than one million school children with nutritious snacks.

December 9: UNICEF launched its final round of polio immunization in Afghanistan for 2003. 25,000 volunteers in 19 provinces administered polio vaccine to 3.4 million children under the age of five.

- As part of Operation Avalanche, U.S. troops followed by helicopters launched an assault in the mountains of Khost province.
- In Kabul, militia forces, involving more than 1,000 soldiers, began the formal process of turning over to the Afghan government their weapons, including about a half-dozen Russian T-54 and T-55 tanks.
- Through local newspapers and radio reports in Afghanistan, the Taliban threatened to kill participants of the constitutional loya jirga in Kabul.

December 10: With no official explanation, the start of the constitutional loya jirga (scheduled to start December 10) was delayed until December 12. President Karzai stated during a press conference that he would not run in future elections if the loya jirga opted for a prime minister as well as a president.

- In Dalan Sang, warlord Mohammed Fahim ordered part of his militia to transport their weapons (including 11 tanks, 10 rocket-launchers and two scud missiles) to an Afghan National Army installation near Kabul.

December 11: In an interview, Zabul province Deputy Governor Mulvi Mohammad Omar said that five of the area's eight districts were now under the indirect control of Taliban sympathizers.

- Officials in Tajikistan said to the media that opium production in Afghanistan increased by six percent for the year.
- In response to recent kidnappings of Indian workers in Afghanistan, India sent two Indo-Tibetan Border Police units to its consulate in Kandahar.
- In Jalalabad, at least three bodyguards of commander Esmatullah Muabat and two soldiers of the Jalalabad militia force were in a clash against U.S. soldiers at a maternity hospital as the soldiers tried to arrest Muabat.
- A small bomb exploded in a trash can about a quarter of a mile from the Indian Consulate in Jalalabad, but nobody was injured.
- After 55 days, Italian engineers completed work to prevent the collapse of the cliff walls that house the remaining fragments of the Bamyan Buddhas.

December 12: The UN's special representative to Afghanistan, Lakhdar Brahimi, stated that the U.N. would have to pull out of the nation if security did not improve.

- A videotape was received by the BBC in Pakistan that revealed recent Taliban activities in southern Afghanistan, including a bomb-making facility.
- Citing the delay in the arrival of some delegates, the start of the constitutional loya jirga (rescheduled for December 12) was delayed until December 13. Human Rights Watch claimed that the constitutional loya jirga was being marred by vote buying, intimidation, and fears that President Karzai would try to force it through the assembly without a proper debate.
- In a move that surprised many, President Karzai named General Abdul Rashid Dostum as one of the delegates to the constitutional loya jirga. Dostum was originally elected as a delegate to represent Uzbeks, but he was later disqualified because of a rule banning military commanders from the delegate elections. Karzai got around the ban by including Dostum in the 50 delegates he was allowed to appoint to the 500-member assembly.

December 14: by a majority vote, Sabghatullah Mujadidi was elected as chairman of the loya jirga. Mujadidi stated to the press that he favored a strong president backed by a strong parliament, and that he sought a moderate form of Islam.

December 15: An explosion was reported in Wardak province.

- An explosion was reported in Jalalabad.
- A dhow stopped by U.S. warships in the Persian Gulf was found to be carrying nearly $10 million in hashish. The drug traffickers were transferred to the Bagram Air Base.

December 16: Three rockets landed in populated areas of Kabul, but there were no casualties.

- Near the village of Durrani southwest of Kabul, President Karzai dedicated a new 300-mile road connecting Kabul to Khandahar. At the ceremony were U.S. Ambassador Zalmay Khalilzad and Afghan Interior Minister Ali Ahmad Jalali. Hundreds of U.S. and Afghan soldiers stood guard along the route to the ceremony.
- At a ceremony held at its headquarters in Qala-e Fathollah, the Hezb-e Jomhorikhahan party expressed its support for a presidential system in the future constitution of Afghanistan.

December 17: During the fourth day of the Loya Jirga of 2003 a proposal made by President Karzai to confine debate to a draft constitution that would give the president sweeping powers was met with protests and interruptions from delegates, mainly supporters of the Northern Alliance. Also Malalai Juya denounced some of her colleagues as war criminals, prompting some delegates to demand her removal from the council and sparking some death threats. Juya was later placed under U.N. protection for her safety. Foreign journalists were barred from covering the session.

- During a search at a checkpoint near a border crossing, more than four Pashtuns were arrested by Pakistani security forces as they tried to smuggle 500 kilograms of explosives into Afghanistan.
- In the mountainside of Kabul, Canadian soldiers delivered Christmas boxes to hundreds of displaced families.

December 18: Scores of Loya jirga delegates protested for a second day against sweeping powers sought by President Karzai. Foreign journalists were barred from covering the session. State-controlled television stopped its live coverage.

- U.S. Chairman of the Joint Chiefs of Staff Richard Myers and comedian Robin Williams visited U.S. troops in Bagram Airbase.
- Loya jirga delegates divided into ten groups to debate the proposed Afghan Constitution article by article.

December 20: Taliban officials offered to release two Indian engineers kidnapped December 6 in exchange for 50 militants. The engineers would not be released until March 2004.

- Loya jirga chairman Sibghatullah Mujaddedi announced that nine of the ten delegate groups had concluded their talks and that their proposed amendments would soon be put to a vote.
- In Shehroba, at least five Afghan soldiers were killed and commander Naik Mohammad was wounded in a Taliban attack.
- Two Afghan Army soldiers were killed when a vehicle in a military convoy hit a remote-controlled bomb along the road between Khost and Kabul.
- Two dhows stopped by U.S. warships in the Arabian Sea were found to be carrying what appeared to be heroin and methamphetamines. The drug traffickers were transferred to Bagram Air Base.

December 21: Two rockets were fired into Kabul. There were no casualties.

- In Kabul, a 10-day cultural and art exhibition of the Islamic Republic of Iran was inaugurated. On hand were Iran's ambassador to Afghanistan Mohammad Reza Bahrami and Afghanistan's Minister of Information and Culture Seyed Makhdum Rahin.
- U.S. General David Barno, the new coalition commander in Afghanistan, outlined changes in the strategy to improve security.

December 22: A review of Afghanistan published by the International Monetary Fund stated that its economy remained threatened by lawlessness and inadequate public safety and urged the Afghan government to ask major creditors to cancel its debts. The review also suggested that opium accounted for half of Afghanistan's gross domestic product.

- Fourteen Taliban suspects were arrested by U.S. and Afghan forces in the Dara Bagh area in Zabul province. Sixteen AK-47 rifles and five heavy machine-guns were seized.

December 23: U.S. and Afghan forces searched the home of Hamidullah Khan Tokhi, a former governor of Zabul province, and seized 60 AK-47 rifles.

December 24: Loya jirga council chairman Sibghatullah Mujaddedi said the delegate groups were ready to present possible amendments.

- Two Indian engineers, abducted December 6 by suspected Taliban, were released without conditions.
- The World Bank approved a US$95 million grant towards Afghanistan's National Self-Help Poverty Eradication programme that aimed to help improve rural development in 20,000 Afghan villages. The villages would elect their own community development councils by secret ballot, and the councils would then choose on what to spend their allocated funds.

December 25: In Kabul, a bomb exploded outside a house used by U.N. staff, demolishing a wall and shattering windows. The blast occurred about 5 miles from the Kabul University, where the Loya jirga was taking place.

- In Kabul, Canadian soldiers were confronted by an angry mob after a pedestrian was injured in an accident involving Canadian vehicles.

December 26: In Deh Sabz, Afghan and ISAF troops arrested seven men suspected of carrying out recent rocket attacks on Kabul. The men were not armed but posters of Osama bin Laden and other documents were found.

December 27: Near Khost, six militants ambushed a car, killing a senior Afghan intelligence officer and wounding two of his colleagues. U.S. troops operating nearby killed four of the attackers but two others got away.

- In the Lalpura District, about 50 kilometres east of Jalalabad, local officials arrested a man carrying 20 home-made bombs.

December 28: In Kabul, near the city's airport, five Afghan security officials detaining a suspect were killed when their vehicle exploded. The suspect was carrying an explosive device which was taken from him, but he then detonated other explosives strapped to his body. The dead included Abdul Jalal, the head of Afghan Defense Minister Mohammad Qasim Fahim's personal security. Several other people were critically injured in the blast. Mullah Abdul Samad, a Taliban spokesman, took responsibility for the blast and said the attack had been carried out by a 35-year-old from Chechnya, but later Taliban leaderHamid Agha stated that Samad was not their spokesman.

- In a detention camp in Nauru, seventeen of over forty hunger striking Afghan asylum-seekers were hospitalized. It was the 19th day of the strike.

December 29: The Afghan Ambassador to Australia, Mahmoud Saikal, called on the twenty four asylum seekers in Nauru to end their week long hunger strike.

- An Afghan man died after an accident involving members of Canada's first rotation of troops in Kabul.

December 30: India donated 300 military vehicles, including military trucks, jeeps and ambulances, to the Afghan National Army.

- Canadian governor general Adrienne Clarkson visited Canadian troops in Camp Julien for the holidays. She was accompanied by her husband John Ralston Saul and several staff members.

December 31: In Shkin a series of clashes between U.S. forces and rebels killed at least three militants and injured three U.S. soldiers. An unconfirmed number of militants also died there when U.S. helicopters bombed a position.

- U.S. ambassador Richard E. Hoagland and Tajikistan Transport Minister Abdu Dzhalil Salimov signed an agreement on the construction of a US$40 million bridge over the Panj River, which separates Tajikistan from Afghanistan.

== See also ==
- 2002 in Afghanistan
- 2004 in Afghanistan
- Timeline of the War in Afghanistan (2001-present)
