= Freedom Medicine =

1980s non-profit medical aid organization

Freedom Medicine is a non-profit organization that provided ambulance and first aid to the interior of Afghanistan during the Soviet occupation of the 1980s it was founded by Gay LeClerc, Bob Brenner, Lynn McFadden and Dr. David Rhodes.

The group, which was based in Pakistan, trained Afghan fighters to provide primary medical aid, and supplied them with ambulances and supplies to start clinics deep in the interior. Freedom medicine established and supplied more than 150 clinics throughout resistance-controlled territory in Afghanistan.
