= Lemar Aftaab =

Afghan weekly magazine

Lemar-Aftaab is an Afghan independent weekly magazine that focuses on the culture and politics of Afghanistan. Compared to other publications in the country, Aftaab has a secular bent and has drawn criticism from conservative Islamic scholars.

== Ban ==
In June 2003, the magazine was banned by the Afghan government because several articles on Islam were deemed to be sacrilegious. The editor of the magazine, Mir Hussein Mehdavi, was arrested and charged with blasphemy. He was later ordered to be released but could still face trial.
