= Barai Ghar =

Group of mountains in Zabul province, Afghanistan

Coordinates: 30.58221°N 69.11980°E

Barai Ghar (Pashto: بری غر) are a group of mountains in the southeast of Zabul province, Afghanistan - 200 km (124 mi) northeast of Kandahar. It is in proximity to Ata Ghar and Shinkay mountains. Topically, some Taliban insurgents used the remote mountainous region as a hiding and regrouping place following the U.S. invasion of Afghanistan.
