= Tora Ghar =

Area near Kandahar, Afghanistan

Tora Ghar is an area in Afghanistan, also known as the Black Mountains, and is located approximately six miles north of Kandahar. Several skirmishes between American troops and Taliban fighters have occurred in Tora Ghar.
