= Orfeo Bartolini =

Italian murder victim

Italian tourist Orfeo Bartolini, 51, was murdered in Afghanistan in April 2003.

Bartolini left his home in Rimini, Italy on March 17, 2003, and set out on by motorcycle for India, where he planned to visit the tomb of Mother Teresa.

On April 10, his motorcycle broke down in the Shahjoi district of Zabul province, Afghanistan. He hired a car to take him to Kabul. On the way, the car was stopped by two men on a motorbike, who then shot Bartolini.

Though the area was a known stronghold of the Taliban, looking to regroup following their removal as leaders of the Afghan government by American and allied forces, Italian ambassador Dominico Georgi originally declared that robbery may be the cause of Bartolini's murder. However, as the Italian's Afghan driver was unhurt in the attack and no robbery was reported, Taliban dissidents remained the chief suspects. The week after the killing, eight Taliban fighters were captured by Afghan soldiers investigating Bartolini's murder in the Sur Ghar area of the country.
