= Trocellen =

- Type: GmbH
- Founded: 1972
- Headquarters: Troisdorf (Rhein-Sieg-Kreis), North Rhine-Westphalia, Germany
- Key people: Akira Kabumoto (CEO/MD)
- Products: Chemical products
- Revenue: 115 million euros (2025)
- Number of employees: 673 (2026)
- Website: trocellen.com

Trocellen GmbH is a manufacturer of cross-linked polyolefin foams. The company's headquarters is located in Troisdorf, Germany.

== History ==
The company was founded in 1972 as a new company and brand of Dynamit Nobel and HT Troplast in Troisdorf, Germany. The company is headquartered in Troisdorf, and has production plants elsewhere in Germany, Italy, Spain, Hungary, and Malaysia.

In 2005, Trocellen was sold to the Japanese Furukawa Electric Co. Ltd. and Otsuka Chemical Co. Ltd.

In 2006, Trocellen acquired Polifoam, a Japanese-Hungarian joint venture founded in 1984.

In 2014, Furukawa Electric Co. Ltd. became the sole owner of Trocellen.

== Products ==
Trocellen manufactures chemically cross-linked and physically cross-linked products based on polyolefin foams, e.g. air ducts, vacuum form parts, compression moulded parts, turf shock pads for the automotive, sport, home, leisure, insulation, construction, footwear and packaging industries.
