= Tahtalı Dam =

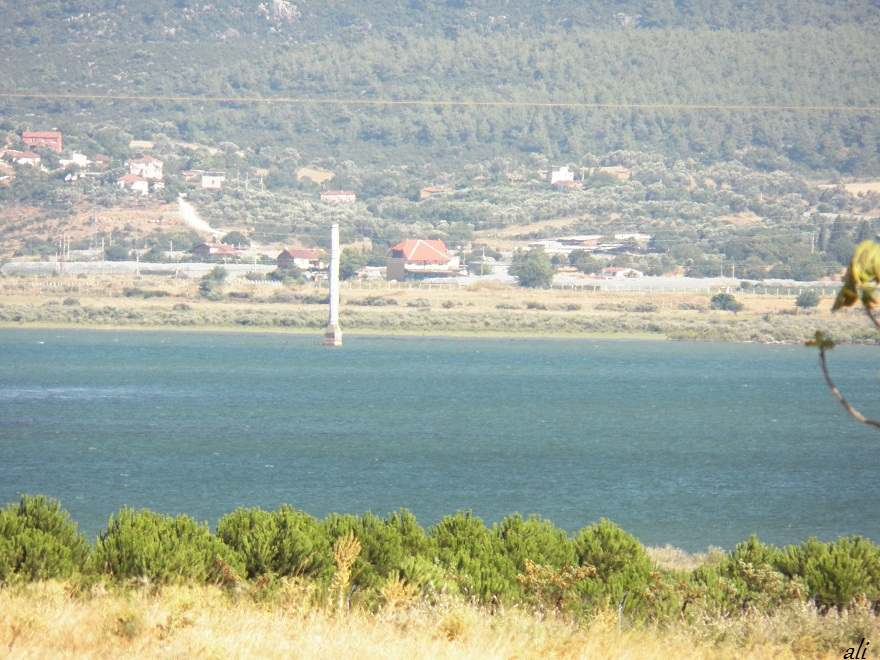
- Location: Turkey
- Coordinates: 38.0884°N 27.0417°E

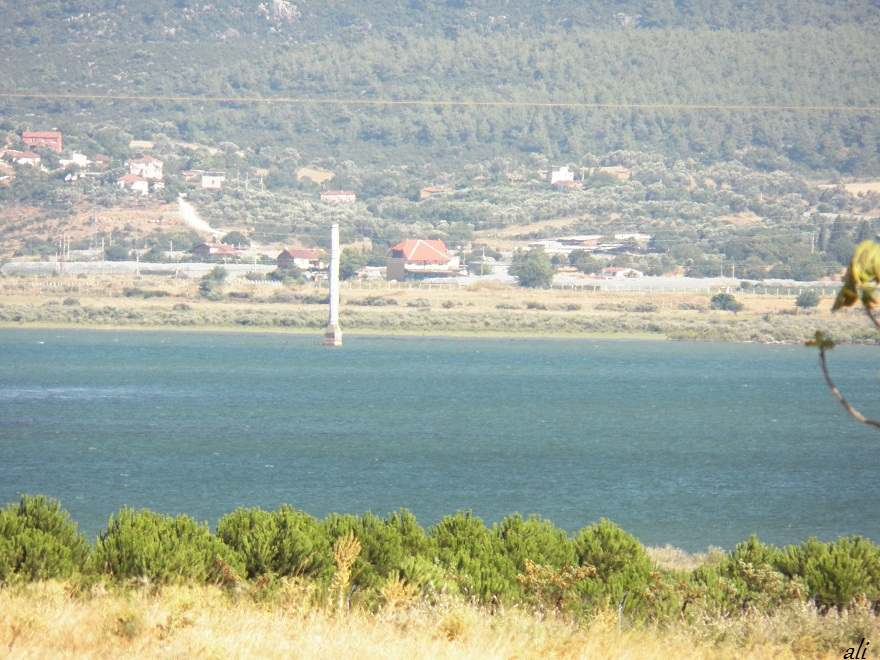
Tahtali Baraji Dam in Turkey

Tahtalı Dam is a dam in İzmir Province, Turkey, built between 1986 and 1999. The development was backed by the Turkish State Hydraulic Works.

== History ==
The dam was built over what used to be the settlement of Bulgurca.

== See also ==
- List of dams and reservoirs in Turkey
