= Troisdorf =

- Town
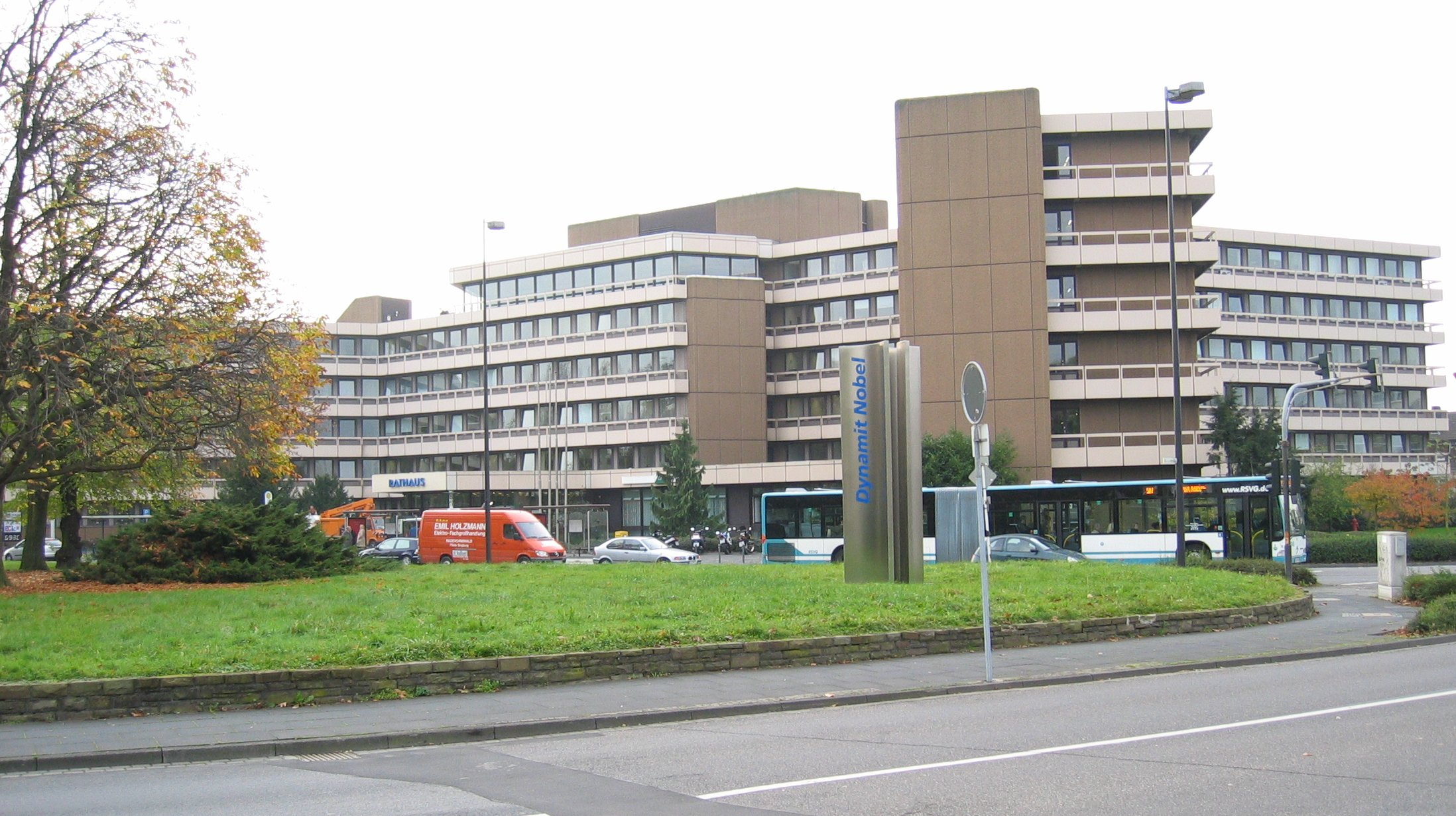
- City hall of Troisdorf

- Coat of arms

- Location of Troisdorf within Rhein-Sieg-Kreis district
- Interactive map of Troisdorf
- Location within Germany Location within North Rhine-Westphalia
- Coordinates: 50°48′58″N 07°09′20″E
- Country: Germany
- State: North Rhine-Westphalia
- Admin. region: Köln
- District: Rhein-Sieg-Kreis
- Subdivisions: 12

Government
  - Mayor (2020–25): Alexander Biber (CDU)

Area
  - Total: 62 km^{2} (24 sq mi)
- Elevation: 55 m (180 ft)

Population (2025-12-31)
  - Total: 75,742
  - Density: 1,200/km^{2} (3,200/sq mi)
- Time zone: UTC+01:00 (CET)
  - Summer (DST): UTC+02:00 (CEST)
- Postal codes: 53840, 53842, 53844
- Dialling codes: 02241, 02203, 02246, 0228
- Vehicle registration: SU
- Website: www.troisdorf.de

Troisdorf (German pronunciation: [ˈtʁoːsdɔʁf]) is a city in the Rhein-Sieg-Kreis (district), in North Rhine-Westphalia, Germany.

== Geography ==
Troisdorf is located approximately 22 kilometers south of Cologne and 13 kilometers north east of Bonn.

=== Division of the city ===
Troisdorf consists of 12 districts (population as of April 2014):

- Troisdorf-Mitte (16,414 inhabitants)
- Altenrath (2,292 inhabitants)
- Bergheim (5,750 inhabitants)
- Eschmar (3,078 inhabitants)
- Friedrich-Wilhelms-Hütte (7,161 inhabitants)
- Kriegsdorf (3,129 inhabitants)
- Müllekoven (1,793 inhabitants)
- Oberlar (6,100 inhabitants)
- Rotter See (3,918 inhabitants)
- Sieglar (8,668 inhabitants)
- Spich (12,765 inhabitants)
- West (5,367 inhabitants)

Total: 76,435 inhabitants

== History ==
Troisdorf became a free city in 1952. In 1969, the urban area expanded with the annexation of the township of Sieglar and the villages of Altenrath and Friedrich-Wilhelms-Hütte (total population in 1969: about 51,000). The first large settlements in this area go back to the 9th and 10th century (Eschmar and Sieglar 832, Bergheim 987). The first churches in this area were built around 700 AD in Bergheim (St. Lambertus).

Troisdorf is home to about 9,600 foreign nationals. The two most numerous foreign national groups are Turks (3,100) and Greeks (1,600). On June 4, 1972, Troisdorf founded the first advisory council for foreign citizens in Germany. In the years following the Peaceful Revolution and German reunification of 1989/1990 many migrants from Russia and other East European countries settled in Troisdorf.

== Demographics ==
Historical population

Year	Pop.	±% p.a.
1965	45,573	—
1970	51,941	+2.65%
1975	56,408	+1.66%
1980	58,616	+0.77%
1985	60,977	+0.79%
1990	64,430	+1.11%
1995	68,778	+1.31%

Year	Pop.	±% p.a.
2000	72,678	+1.11%
2005	74,760	+0.57%
2010	75,369	+0.16%
2015	74,400	−0.26%
2020	74,994	+0.16%
2025	75,742	+0.20%

Source: Landesdatabank Nordrhein-Westfalen

Troisdorf has a predominantly Christian population: Roman Catholics, Protestants, Baptists, Jehovah's Witnesses and other Christian denominations, along with Muslim, Orthodox Christian and Jewish populations of non-indigenous origin. Troisdorf is one of the German cities whose mosque includes a minaret; it was built for the local Islamic community.

== Mayors ==
- 1969–1975: Josef Ludwig (CDU)
- 1975–1993: Hans Jaax (SPD)
- 1993–1998: Uwe Göllner (SPD)
- 1998–1999: Walter Bieber (SPD)
- 1999–2009: Manfred Uedelhoven (CDU)
- 2009–2020: Klaus-Werner Jablonski (CDU)
- 2020–incumbent: Alexander Biber (CDU)

== Notable places ==
Europe's only picture-book museum is located in Troisdorf at the Wissem Castle.

== Twin towns – sister cities ==
Troisdorf is twinned with:

- Évry-Courcouronnes, France (1972)
- Genk, Belgium (1990)
- Heidenau, Germany (1990)
- Redcar and Cleveland, United Kingdom (1990)
- Corfu, Greece (1996)
- Nantong, China (1997)
- Özdere, Turkey (2004)

== Notable people ==
- John Siberch (c. 1476–1554), pioneering printer and friend of Erasmus
- Walter Stern (1896–1970), art critic and broadcaster
- Paul Schäfer (1921–2010), cult leader, founder of Colonia Dignidad
- Rupert Neudeck (1939–2016), humanitarian worker, founder of the Cap Anamur
- Tom Buhrow (born 1958), news anchor
- Lena Schöneborn (born 1986), pentathlete, Olympic champion
- Sabine Lisicki (born 1989), tennis player
- Mitchell Weiser (born 1994), footballer
- Fabian Schiller (born 1997), racing driver

== Transport links ==
Troisdorf station, entry and Bike and Ride (B+R) lot (right side)

The suburban trains S12 and S19 of Cologne S-Bahn as well as the local train RE9 (Rhein-Sieg-Express) serve Troisdorf. Troisdorf is located in the fare association Rheinland-Tarif.
