= 100 Classrooms program =

The 100 Classrooms program was a joint project by Deutsche Welle and Cap Anamur to build and restore classrooms in Afghanistan after the U.S. invasion of 2001. Beginning June 13, 2003, the program helped to build nearly 300 classrooms and 32 schools.

== Overview ==
Schools were built in Novobad, Jamchi, Yanqiqala, Laclacond, Sardcomar and Baharak. Classrooms were approximately 40 square meters, meant to accommodate 30 to 40 students. Local leaders were required to agree that the schools be open to both boys and girls, that recreation areas would be co-ed, and that teachers would be paid by the local communities.

== Funding ==
The project was funded by donations from around the world, totaling more than €380,000.
