= Özdere =

- Neighbourhood
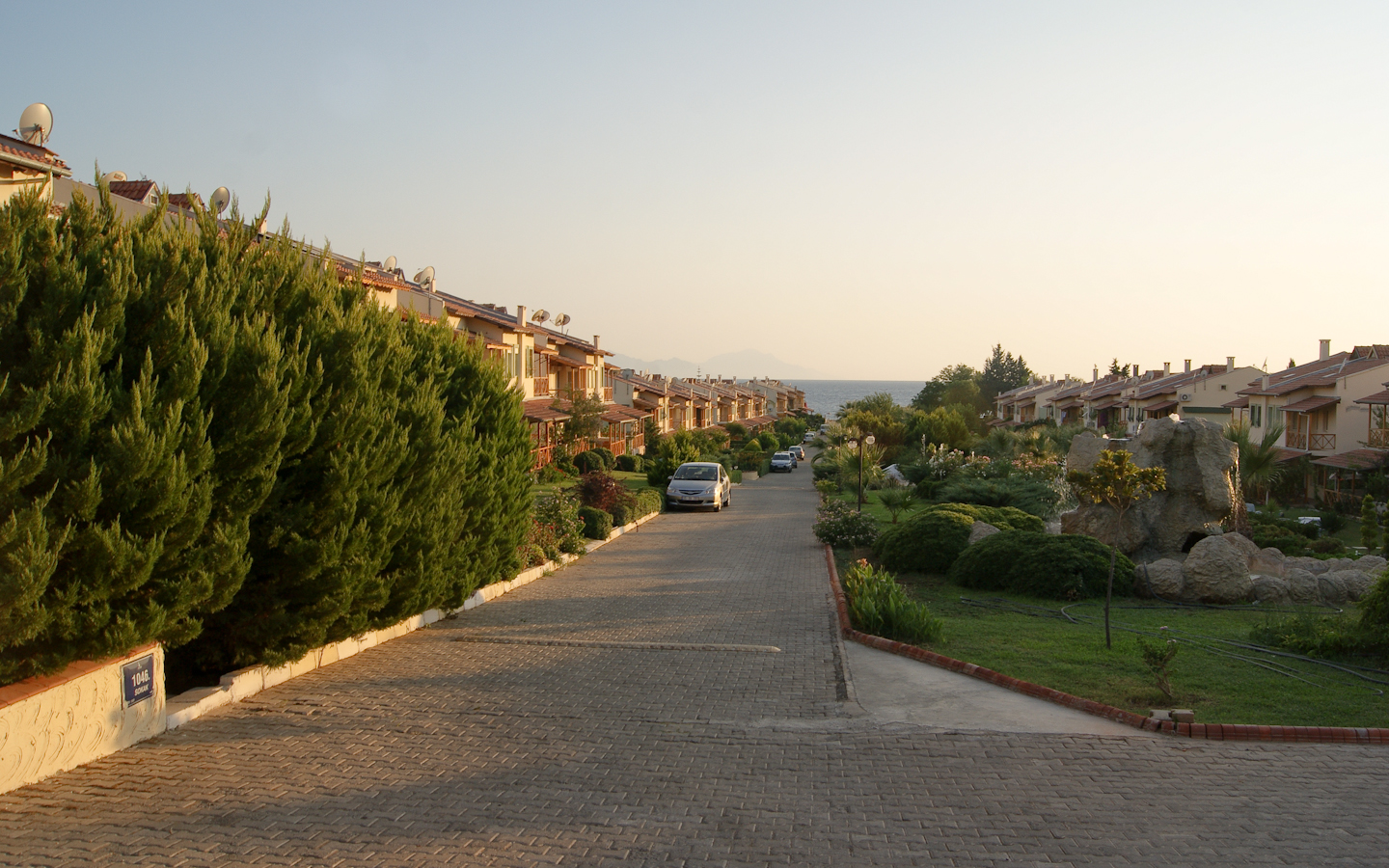
- A residential community near the town center

- Location within Turkey Location within İzmir
- Coordinates: 38°1′3″N 27°7′42″E
- Country: Turkey
- Province: İzmir
- District: Menderes
- Population (2022): 1,499
- Time zone: UTC+3 (TRT)
- Postal code: 35495
- Area code: 0232
- Website: www.ozdere.org

Özdere (English: /ˈoʊzˌdɛreɪ/, Turkish pronunciation: [œzdeɾe]) is a neighbourhood in the municipality and district of Menderes, İzmir Province, Turkey. Its population is 1,499 (2022). It is a coastal settlement and resort town along the Aegean Sea coast. With adjacent neighbourhoods it has a permanent population of around 15,000 people, which can rise to nearly 100,000 during the summer (Note: Estimates on the summer population number vary. The largest number is used throughout the article as the most accurate estimate and may be found on the official website, however all other estimates are smaller, with numbers ranging from 10,000 to 85,000.) as a result of its popularity amongst tourists.

It is located approximately 40 kilometres (25 mi) northwest of the nearby resort town of Kuşadası, 45 kilometres (28 mi) south of Menderes, the district seat, and 65 kilometres (40 mi) to the south of İzmir, the provincial seat. The town is situated in close proximity to numerous historical sites and is accessible via the Kuşadası-Selçuk-Seferihisar-Urla provincial road.

The area was settled and cultivated long before Turkish administration of the area, which is reflected in the several historical names the town once bore. During the Ottoman period the town was known as Kesri. In the 1960s, the village underwent a considerable increase in density and population and started to be generally referred to by its current name, Özdere. On June 3, 1979, a municipality was established in Menderes district under this name, with the official borders of the town being drawn. It was merged into the municipality of Menderes in 2008.

With a temperate climate and favorable location, the town is a local center of tourism, which its economy is primarily and steadfastly centered upon. The customs and culture revolve around the behaviors of local business owners, the attire of residents, and its cuisine. Although several pharmacies and doctors practice in the area, as of 2015 the town no longer has an independent municipal health department (Turkish: sağlık ocağı), and such affairs are operated and administered by the district. Numerous schools are located within or near the town and its vicinity.

The ease of access to the town makes the administration of several shuttle buses and share taxis by the province and from central İzmir to Özdere and its beaches possible. Dolmuş and coach buses also operate from the İzmir bus station and from other nearby towns such as Kuşadası and Seferihisar. The town can be reached from the İzmir Adnan Menderes International Airport, where rental car services and taxis can be used to the reach the town center, its neighborhoods, and nearby areas. Ferry and yacht services can be found at several harbors within and near town.

== History and toponymy ==
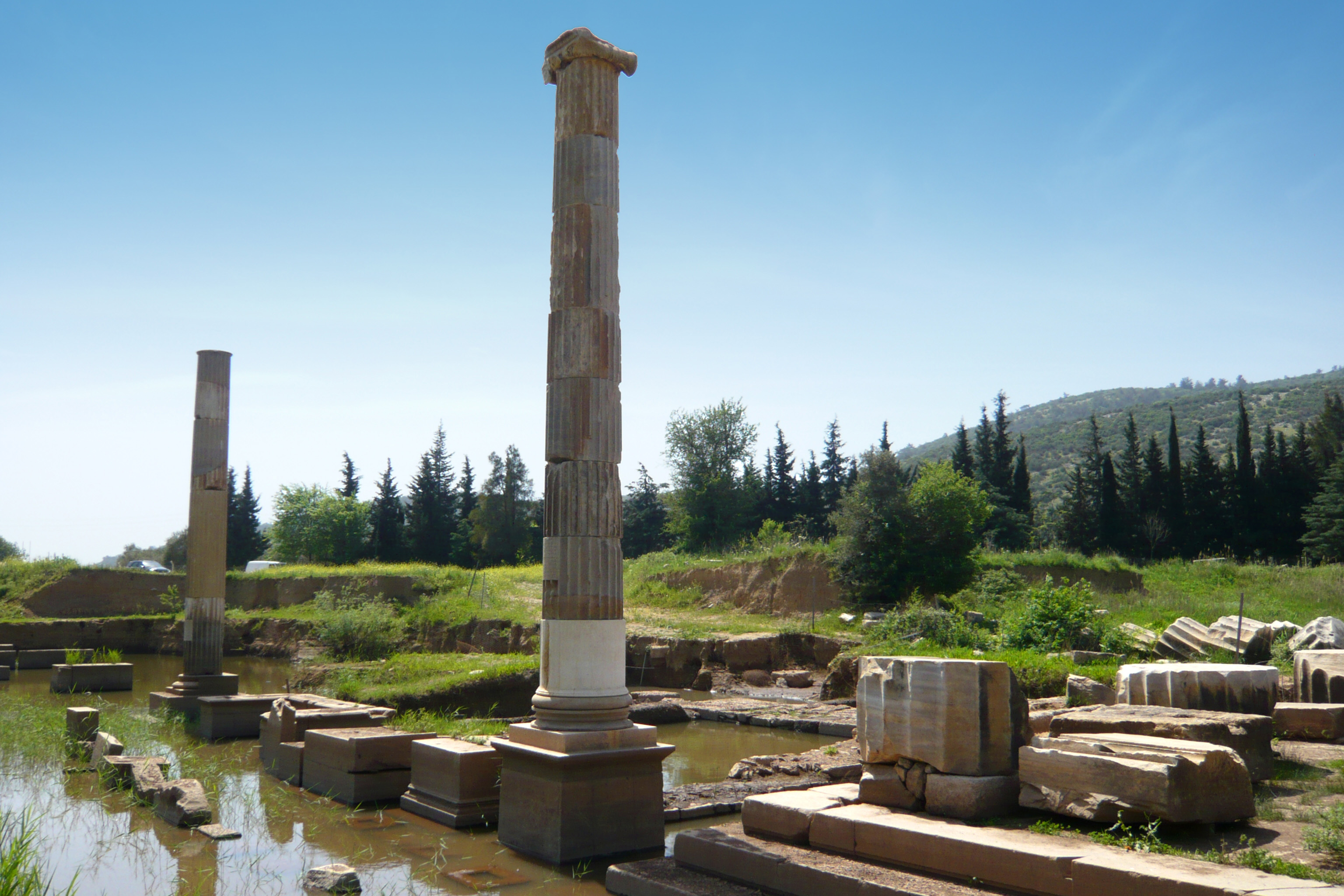
The ruins of Claros

The areas surrounding the Gulf of İzmir and Karaburun Peninsula have been settled since prehistoric times, with the earliest settlements near Özdere dating to 5,000 BC. During the peak of the Bronze Age, during around the 2nd millennium BC, the nearby lands were referred to as Kasura by resident Hittite clans, evidenced by the findings of ancient Arzawan structures and engravings atop the mountains of the peninsula. After Ionian settlers and surveyors arrived in the area, numerous cities were built and several temples and sites of worship erected within the vicinity of Özdere, which they named Dios Hieron. Nearby Ionian sites include the sanctuaries and cities of Claros, Notion, Teos, Lebedos, Colophon and Myonnessos. In Myonnessos it is possible unearthed ancient coins were minted with the inscriptions MY, although it is more likely that this occurred in Myus, also in Ionia but much farther south. During this period, the historian Herodotus is also said to have visited the city on his travels across Asian Ionia and Anatolia.

The coastal settlement of Dios Hieron thrived through the era of Hellenistic and Roman conquests of western Anatolia. Previously overshadowed by nearby cities, Dios Hieron increased in population and status. The city was situated along an important trade route from Ephesus, passing through Claros until the route reached Teos. In Ionian times, the trade route was even more significant, as their Ancient Olympic Games were hosted in Teos and provided access to the games via the route through the plains of the fertile Aegean Region. During the late 1st millennium BC and the early 1st millennium CE some of the most commonly used measurements of distance between the ancient sites of Ionia were made by the geographer Strabo, measuring approximately 120 stadia between Colophon and Lebedus and 70 between Colophon and Ephesus.

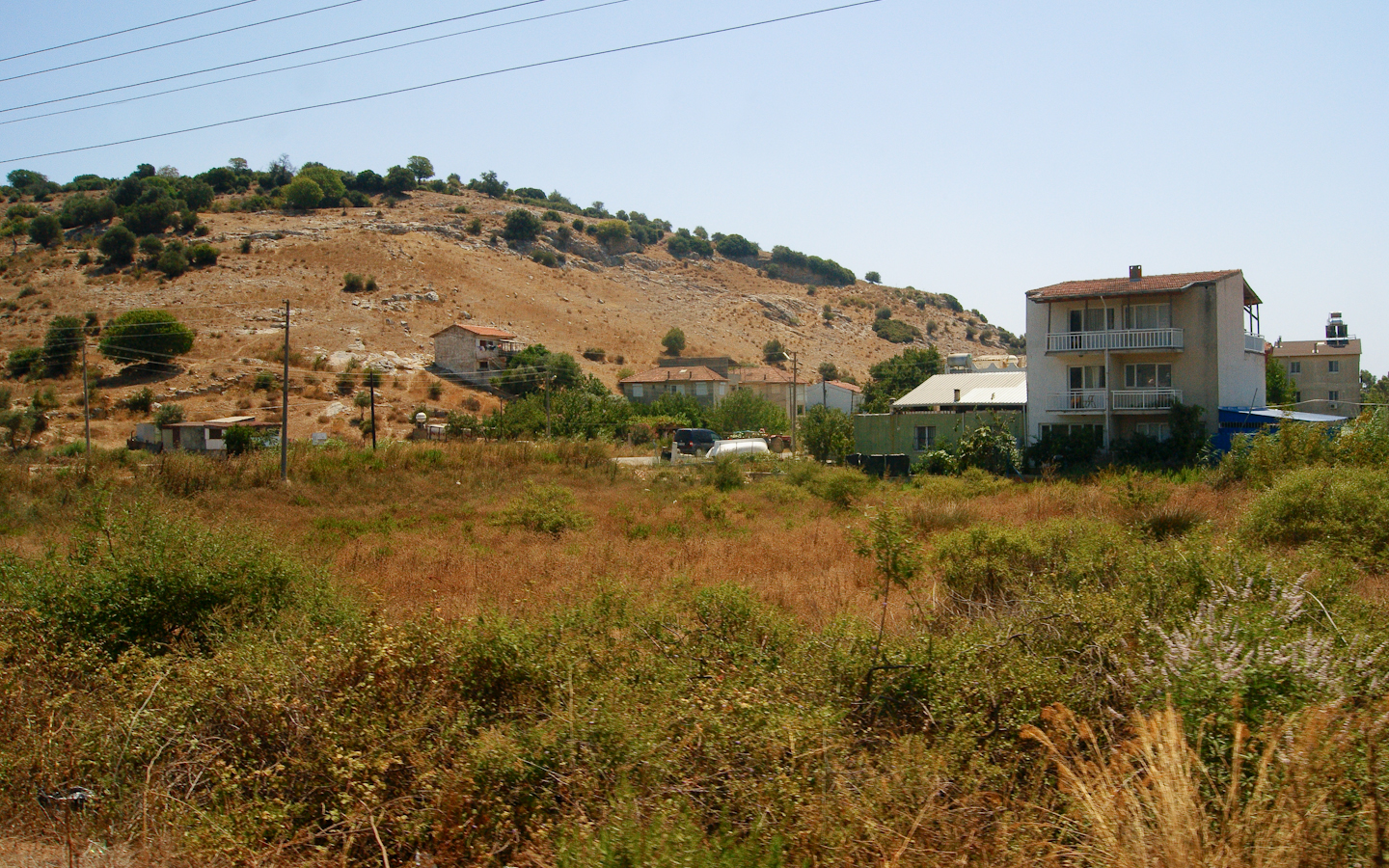
Houses near historic Kesri

The first evidence of Turkish settlements in the area date to the 14th and 15th centuries. Subsequently, after the compromised Byzantine Empire lost many of its former territories to the Seljuk Turks, the fall of the Sultanate of Rum led to the partitioning of Asia Minor into small, loosely associated Anatolian beyliks, or principalities. One of these beyliks was the Principality of Aydın, which at the time reigned over a large, southern portion of modern-day İzmir Province and the entire Karaburun Peninsula, as well as the lands of the future province of its namesake. The region which Özdere is located in today was discovered and settled in 1329 by the Aydinid and future Emir (Prince) of Aydın Umur Bey, and at the time was named the village of İpsili. Doğan Bey, who also aided in the expedition, is the namesake of the current town, just west of Özdere today. During the annexation of the principality by the growing Ottoman Empire, which was once a beylik in itself, the areas surrounding İpsili were expanded, and as a result, the village of Kesri, sometimes referred to as Kesre, was constructed and founded. The village continued to grow and remained under the same name until the establishment of the Republic of Turkey, when the influence of modern Turkish led to it being renamed Özdere. This period was characterised by a large scale urbanization effort with a significant population increase, which in turn prompted the district of Menderes to establish the municipality of Özdere within itself.

== Geography ==
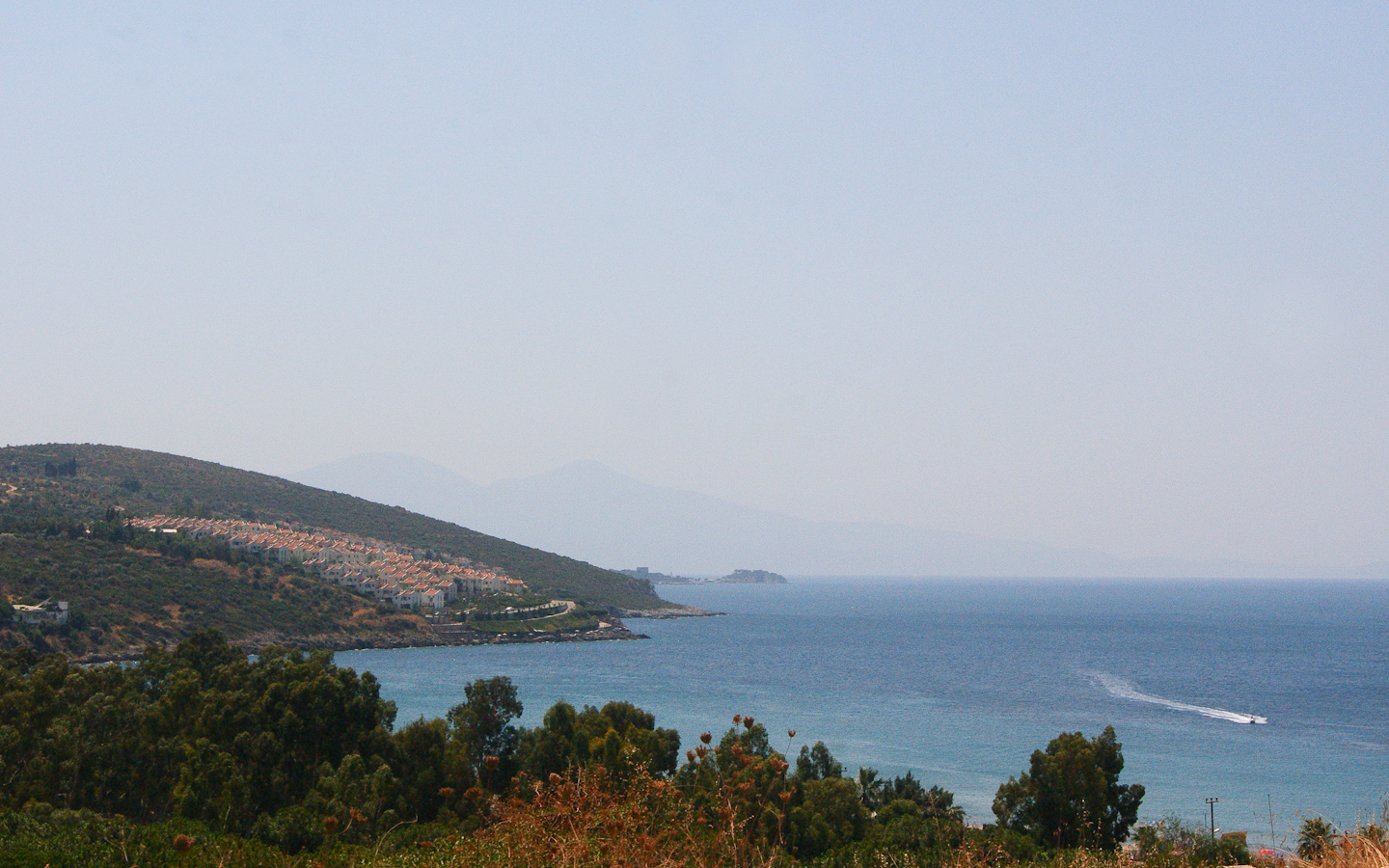
A view from near Özdere facing south towards Kuşadası

Özdere is a part of the so-called Turkish Riviera, and is situated along the southern face of the Karaburun Peninsula. It is one of the northern towns of the Gulf of Kuşadası, with its shoreline parallel to the Dilek Peninsula in the south. During the town's incorporation, it was divided into 4 mahalle (neighborhoods). These include the historic town center and the Ottoman village of Kesri in the east, known today as Cumhuriyet Mahallesi; the central neighborhood of Çukuraltı Mahallesi, sandwiched between the others; the westernmost neighborhood of Orta Mahallesi consisting of the coastal community and beaches, bordering the Seferihisar district; and the easternmost neighborhood of Ahmetbeyli Mahallesi, containing the ruins of Claros and which borders the district of Selçuk. The combined total land area of the four mahalle was 85 square kilometres (33 sq mi). After the town's dissolution and merge with the city of Menderes and as of the present, these are no longer intact and there are no political boundaries or neighborhoods to the town; however, their context still remains geographically.

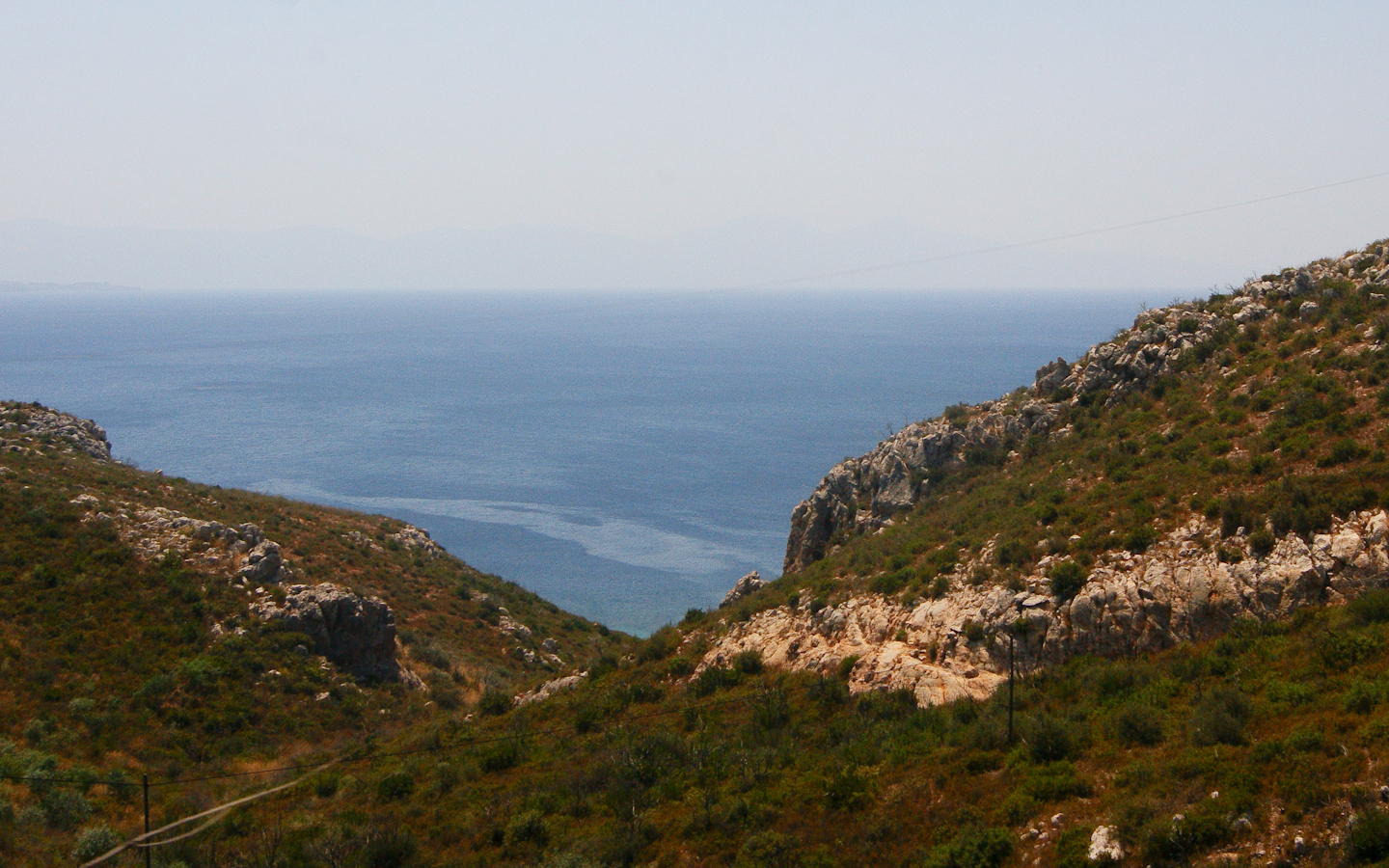
Cliffs overlooking the sea

The town is located approximately 40 kilometres (25 mi) from the port town of Kuşadası, 55 km (34 mi) from the Aegean Region's largest city of İzmir and the seat of its province (but a 70 km (43 mi) drive due to road accessibility), 34–40 km (21–25 mi) from the town of Selçuk and its historical sites such as Ephesus and the House of the Virgin Mary, 40 km (25 mi) from the district's seat of Menderes, and 150 km (93 mi) from Çeşme, the westernmost settlement on the Karaburun Peninsula. The town is within the vicinity of numerous historical sites, many ancient Ionian sanctuaries and cities. Situated about 20 km (12 mi) from Claros, 23 km (14 mi) from Notion, 33 km (21 mi) from Colophon, 38 km (24 mi) from Ephesus, and 40 km (25 mi) from Teos (now in modern-day Seferihisar), its location along common tourist itineraries aid it in attracting more visitors to the town during the summer.

The town is about 210 km (130 mi) from the hot springs and historical sites of Pamukkale and Hierapolis. The large resort and waterpark Adaland can be reached after a 35-minute drive southwards.

The town reaches approximately 100 m (330 ft) at its highest elevation, with mountainous terrain surrounding it to the north within the peninsula. This is a result of Turkey's fault block features – the convergence of the Anatolian Plate against that of the Aegean Sea Plate – and the wide range of mountains in western Turkey and the Aegean Region surrounding the Büyük Menderes River to the south, collectively referred to as the Menderes Massif.

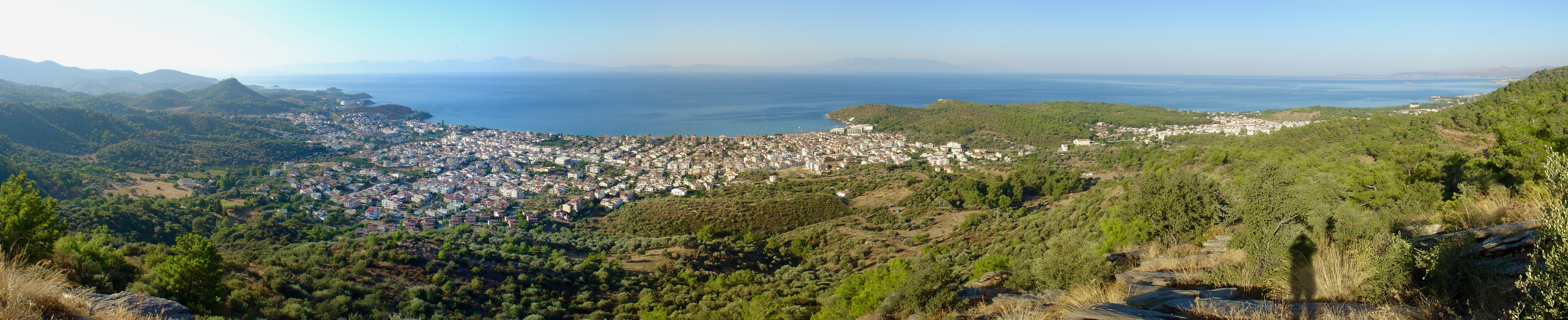
Panoramic view of Özdere with the mountains of Dilek Peninsula and Samos in the background

=== Climate ===
Özdere has a Mediterranean climate (Köppen climate classification Csa), with warm, dry summers, and with the majority of its annual precipitation falling during its cool to mild winters. With a mean annual temperature of 16.8 °C (62.2 °F), the town has significantly temperate, even subtropical climate characteristics.

Precipitation levels range from 2–155 millimetres (0.079–6.102 in), with the most falling during the month of December. Due to the persistent winter precipitation, humidity levels are most concentrated during that season, and to a lesser extent in the spring. The lowest average humidity is seen in June, and the highest during November. With both shorter days and rainier weather taken into consideration, the town receives substantially fewer hours of daily sunshine during the winter than in any other season of the year.

Climate data for Özdere (Cumhuriyet Mahallesi)
Month	Jan	Feb	Mar	Apr	May	Jun	Jul	Aug	Sep	Oct	Nov	Dec	Year
Mean daily maximum °C (°F)	12.7 (54.9)	13.7 (56.7)	15.9 (60.6)	19.9 (67.8)	24.3 (75.7)	28.7 (83.7)	30.9 (87.6)	30.6 (87.1)	27.6 (81.7)	23.1 (73.6)	18.5 (65.3)	14.8 (58.6)	21.7 (71.1)
Daily mean °C (°F)	8.8 (47.8)	9.6 (49.3)	11.3 (52.3)	14.8 (58.6)	18.9 (66.0)	23.0 (73.4)	25.3 (77.5)	25.0 (77.0)	22.0 (71.6)	17.9 (64.2)	14.0 (57.2)	10.9 (51.6)	16.8 (62.2)
Mean daily minimum °C (°F)	5.0 (41.0)	5.6 (42.1)	6.7 (44.1)	9.8 (49.6)	13.5 (56.3)	17.3 (63.1)	19.8 (67.6)	19.4 (66.9)	16.5 (61.7)	12.8 (55.0)	9.6 (49.3)	7.1 (44.8)	11.9 (53.4)
Average precipitation mm (inches)	146 (5.7)	104 (4.1)	80 (3.1)	42 (1.7)	26 (1.0)	6 (0.2)	2 (0.1)	2 (0.1)	16 (0.6)	44 (1.7)	89 (3.5)	155 (6.1)	712 (27.9)
Average precipitation days	12	11	10	9	6	4	7	6	5	6	9	13	98
Average relative humidity (%)	69	70	66	61	52	44	47	52	62	70	74	72	62
Source: Climate Data, World Climate Guide (precipitation days), Weather Averages (humidity)

Özdere mean sea temperature from May to November
May	Jun	Jul	Aug	Sep	Oct	Nov
18 °C (64 °F)	21 °C (70 °F)	23 °C (73 °F)	23 °C (73 °F)	22 °C (72 °F)	21 °C (70 °F)	18 °C (64 °F)

== Culture ==
The current traditions of Özdere's permanent population may have been derived in part from the culture of nomadic Ottoman settlers of the town of Kesri, as reflected in the continued use of traditional attire, marriage customs, and cuisine traceable to that period. By contrast, some of these traditional displays are rarely seen in the modern culture of most of Turkey and of İzmir especially.

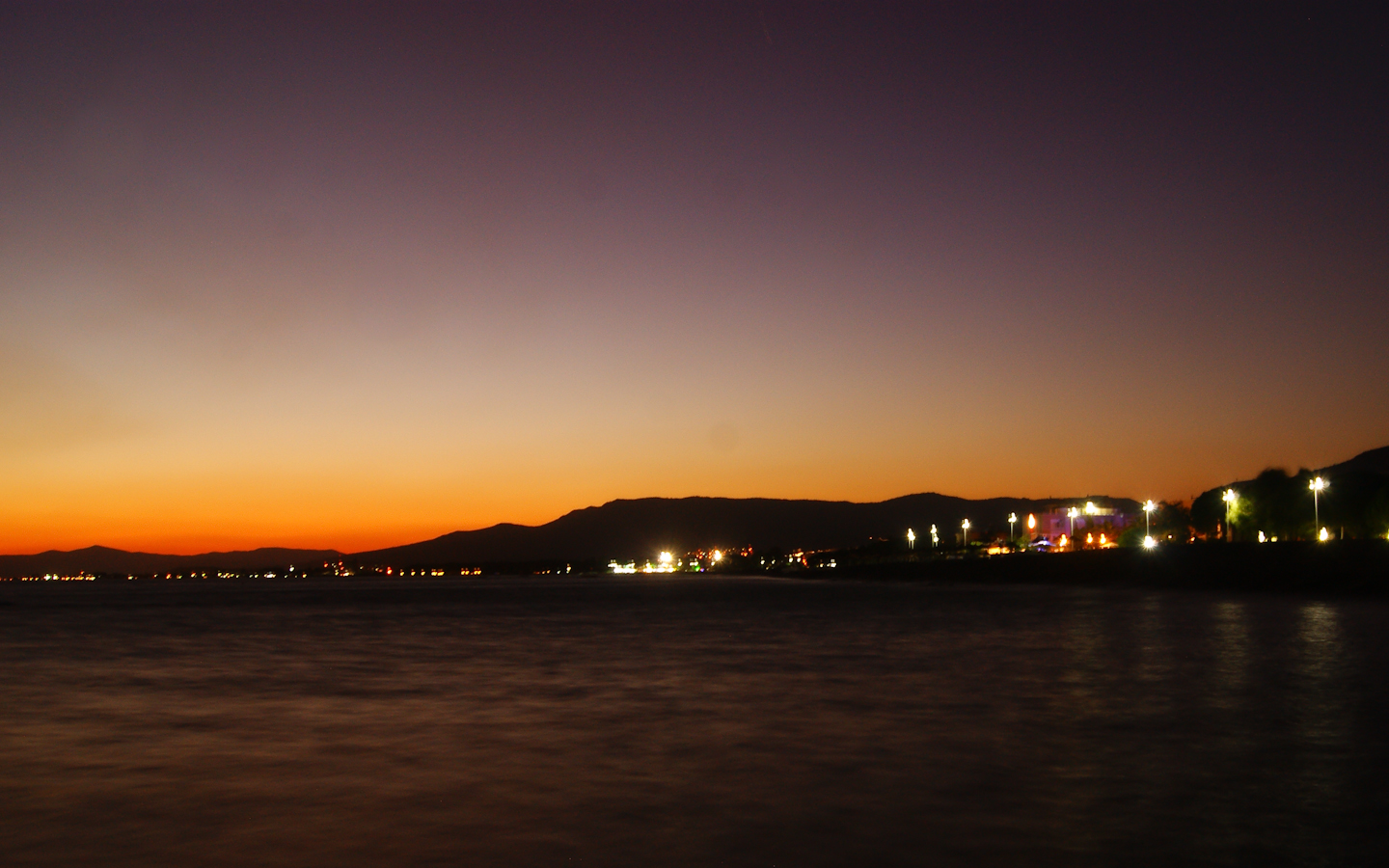
Özdere as seen after sunset

The inhabitants of some of the older settlements within the town, such as within Cumhuriyet Mahallesi, wear different styles and assortments of traditional shalwar clothing, including sweaters in the winter and in colder weather, and sometimes seen in the headscarves of married women. Blouses are generally worn with short sleeves, matched with wide and baggy side-sewn pants made from thin fabrics. During weddings, variations of the standard traditional attire may be seen, including such features as frilly pant sleeves, embroidered patterns and elastic waist belts and bands.

=== Cuisine ===
The typical cuisine and dishes of Özdere draw influence from local Aegean and Turkish dishes. Some of the more common meals prepared include: meatball soup with broth and peas (Turkish: topalak); pastry dough filled with chicken (Turkish: tavuklu börek); a ceremonial stew prepared on special occasions with barley, wheat, and various meats (often chicken) (Turkish: keşkek); and a soup with embossed dough and meat chunks (Turkish: kulaklı çorba).

=== Events ===
During the summer months, live shows, outdoor concerts and theatrical events are hosted in order to increase public excitement and attract more visitors. Arguably the most important event and exposition occurring in town is the annual International Culture, Arts, and Tourism Festival (Turkish: Uluslararası Kültür, Sanat, ve Turi̇zm Festi̇vali), during which foreign and domestic folklore events, concerts, water sports competitions, and crafts expositions take place. The festival is hosted and begins each year on the second Saturday of July, and continues for two weeks. The town hosts a local sports club, officially registered and regulated under the name Özdere Belediye Spor by the Turkish Football Federation.

== Government ==
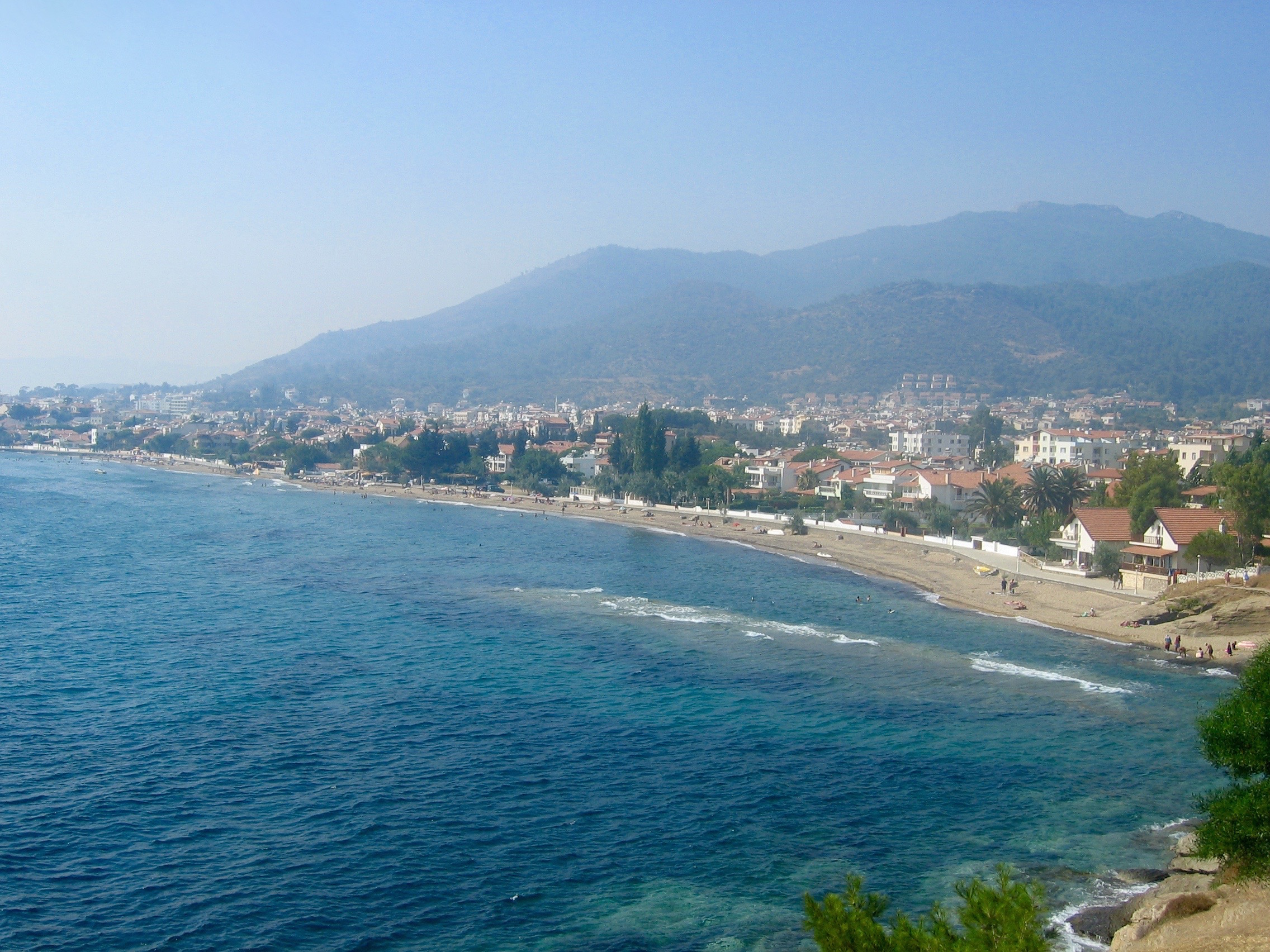
An outlook of the town center

On June 3, 1979, Özdere was incorporated as a constituent municipality of Menderes District in İzmir Province, with Arif Sinan being the town's first assigned mayor. Today, there is a road in Özdere named after him. The town was partitioned into four politically and geographically distinct neighborhoods, each of which drew the town borders. The town officially had an approximate land area of 85 square kilometres (33 sq mi), and to this day operates under the postal code 35495. The town was led under the authority of several mayors until it elected its final and longest-serving mayor, Haldun Ertok of the Republican People's Party (CHP) in 1989. The town's municipal government allowed it to operate and organize several services and manage affairs independently. In 2008, however, ordinance 5747 of the district government abolished the municipality, officially unincorporated and acquired administration of all municipal services, and dissolved the town's political boundaries and neighborhoods as a merge with the district's seat of Menderes. In 2014, during the Menderes local elections, incumbent Bülent Soylu of the Justice and Development Party (AKP) won first past the post with 20,654 votes. Ahmet Pala of the CHP had only 20,222 votes, losing by a 432-vote margin.

The former mayors of Özdere were as follows: Arif Sinan from 1979 until 1980, Hasan Taşkin from 1980 to 1981, from 1981 to 1984 Mecit Gökyokuş, Şükrü Özkan between 1984 and 1989, and finally Haldun Ertok from that point onwards until 2008. The current mayor of the city of Menderes is Bülent Soylu (AKP), and the governor of the district is Ahmet Ufuk Hasçakal.

Near the town, there is a forested reservation known as Kalemlik Milli Parkı, or in some situations Kalemlik Mesire Yeri (English: Kalemlik National Park, Kalemlik Promenade, respectively). This park is currently privately operated and is recognized by the Turkish Ministry of Forest and Water Management.

== Economy ==
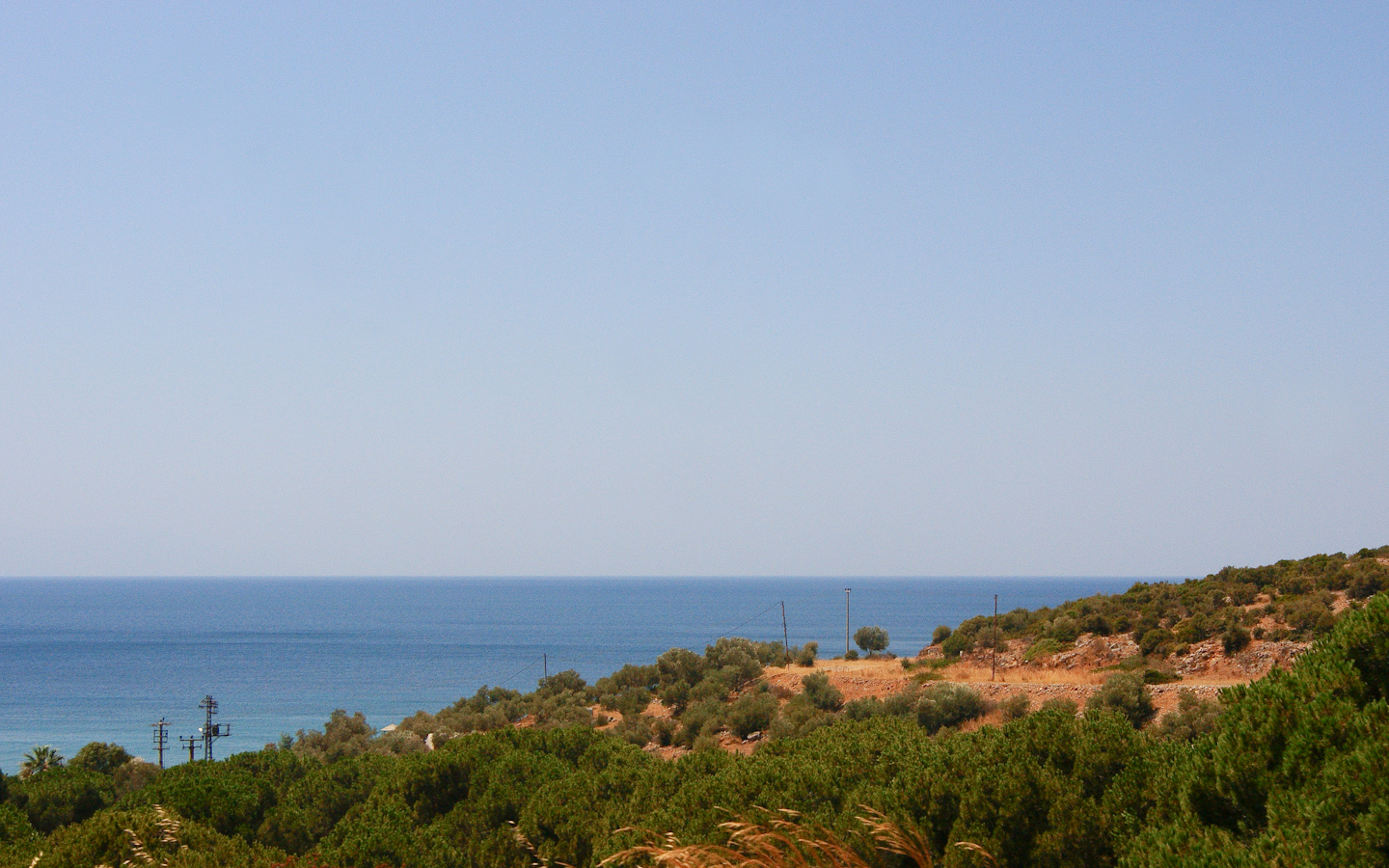
A view of the Aegean Sea from a nearby hill

Özdere's economy has historically revolved around its agricultural value and for its livestock and fishery farming opportunities. The fertile soil in the area has been cultivated since the earliest Bronze Age settlements, and one of the most important harvests in the area of past and present is that of the Satsuma mandarin (Citrus unshiu). In later times, the plantation of olives, wine grapes, and other species further aided the town's income and significance. Horned livestock farms, poultry farms and fisheries were always and are still active in the town. Such services are a significant contributor and once the only factor in the town's economy, however this has changed with the introduction of tourism in the town, spawning hundreds of new businesses and services to satisfy this sole purpose.

=== Tourism ===
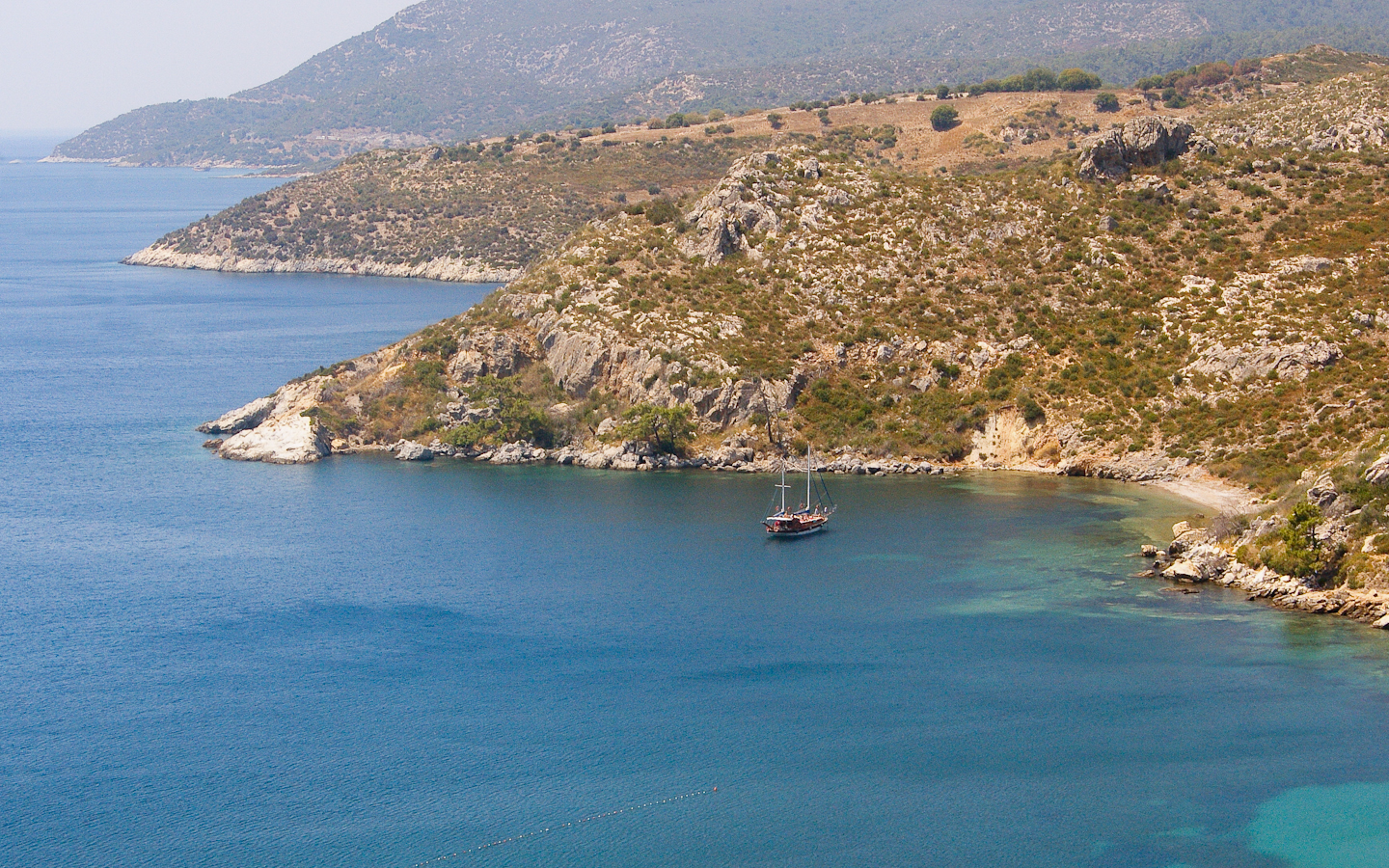
A boat navigating the town's coves

In modern-day Özdere, local businesses and even district services are impacted greatly by the fluctuations and abundances of tourist revenue and revenue generated from the purchases and interactions of visitors. The promenades and walkways along the shoreline host numerous taverns, shops and restaurants that cater to visitors. Exotic jewelry stores and shopping malls within the town center and near the beach and access roads tend to attract tourists and flaunt their presence to visitors, but to a lesser extent than other nearby and arguably more popular resort towns such as Kuşadası. In the inner streets, food vendors and farmer's markets operate modestly and see more success during the summer, a high point for tourism in the town when the climate and beach conditions are more favorable. Travel agencies, rental car and holiday home services, and the like thrive in Özdere due to its high demand and the town's continuous expansion. The same applies for tour companies and charters.

Tourism in Özdere saw its beginnings in the mid-1960s, when the town was first referred to by its current name, and during which the first tourist resorts began their construction. Today, those same tourist resorts and hotels, known today as Club Marvy and the Paloma Pasha Resort have 434 and 268 rooms, respectively. Income from tourism and its industry are estimated to be growing each year, and by the beginning of the 21st century the amount of currency exchanged within the town totaled at approximately 1,000,000,000,000 ₺. With economic growth from tourist revenue still continuing to expand at the same rate, as of the present total tourist revenue for the town without expenses is estimated to be at 4,000,000,000,000 ₺. The abundance of hotels and resorts are one of the primary factors in the town's exponential summer population expansion.

== Education and health ==
Özdere has administered elementary, middle and high schools, currently operated under Turkey's Ministry of Education and by the district government. Each year, Ege University's Institute of Health, Culture, and Sports in İzmir funds educational programs and camps in Özdere.

From its incorporation in 1979 until its dissolution in 2008, the town has operated its own municipal health center (Turkish: sağlık ocağı), backed by the Ministry of Health. Including this, the town has had and still has some of several doctors, nurses, and midwives, and numerous pharmacies and drugstores.

== Transportation ==
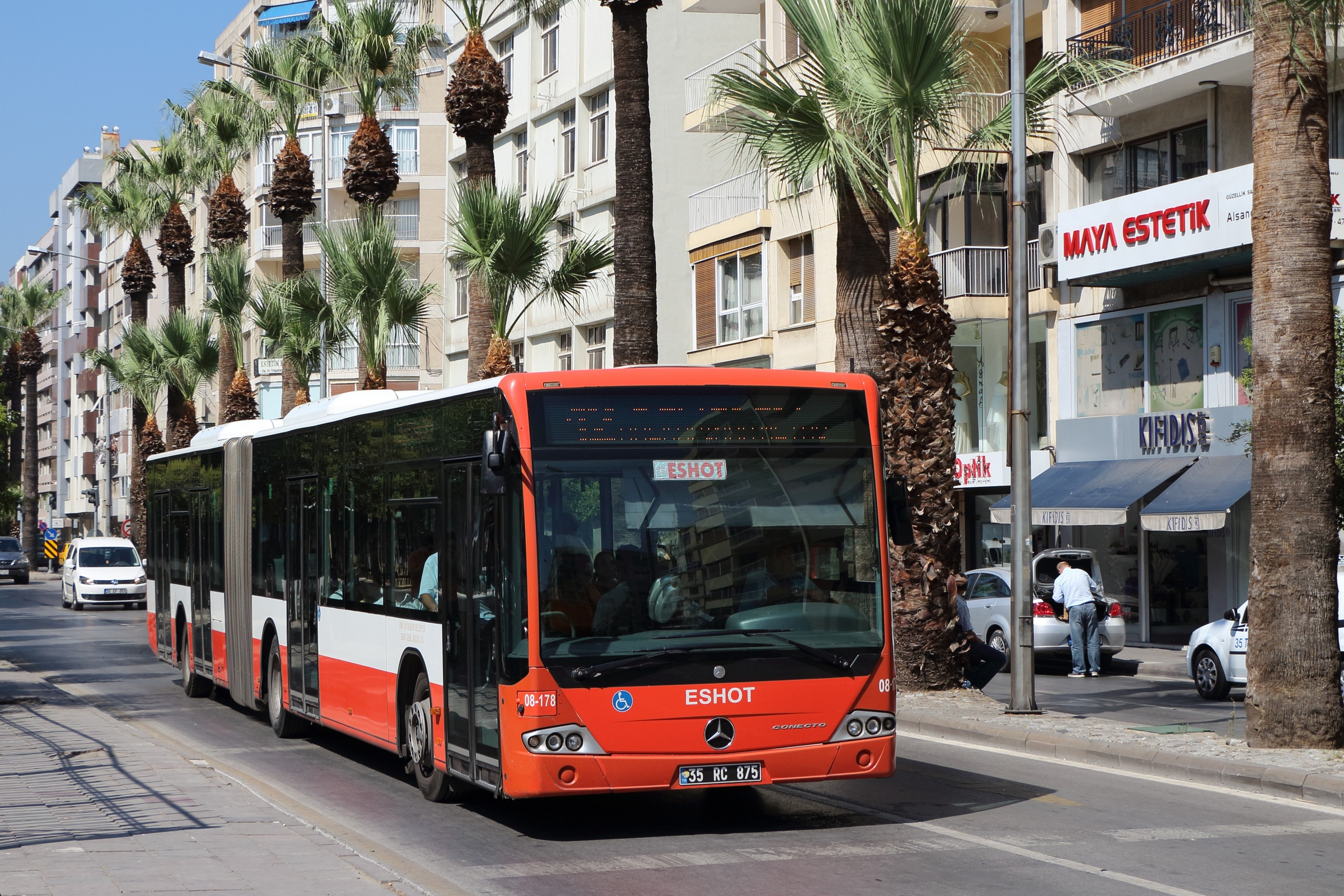
A metropolitan bus in İzmir

Özdere is situated 45 kilometres (28 mi) from the İzmir Adnan Menderes International Airport. From the airport, share taxis and İzmir's municipal buses can be used to reach the town. The terrain of the Karaburun Peninsula is traversed from north to south by the Provincial road 35-39 running from the O.32 motorway in the north through Seferihisar and along its southeastern shores to Özdere, and eventually to Kuşadası. The bus stations (Turkish: otogar) in İzmir, Kuşadası, and Seferihisar operate coach buses at varying time intervals to Özdere. Third-party rental car services can be acquired at the town center, and such businesses are a major component of the town's economy and touristic value.

Harbors along the town's coast and beaches, especially in Orta Mahallesi, host and are hubs of several yacht and tour boat companies. The waters are generally shallow for the first 50–100 metres (160–330 ft), and clear waters aid in navigation of its many bays and coves. Waves and currents in the gulf are usually light or absent, however this can vary depending on tide, sea level, wind speed and wind direction. For such reasons, water tour companies generally operate from around May until November, when the water and climate conditions are more favorable and tourist demand is more active.

== Twin and sister cities ==
Özdere is twinned with:

- Troisdorf, Germany, since 2004

== Gallery ==
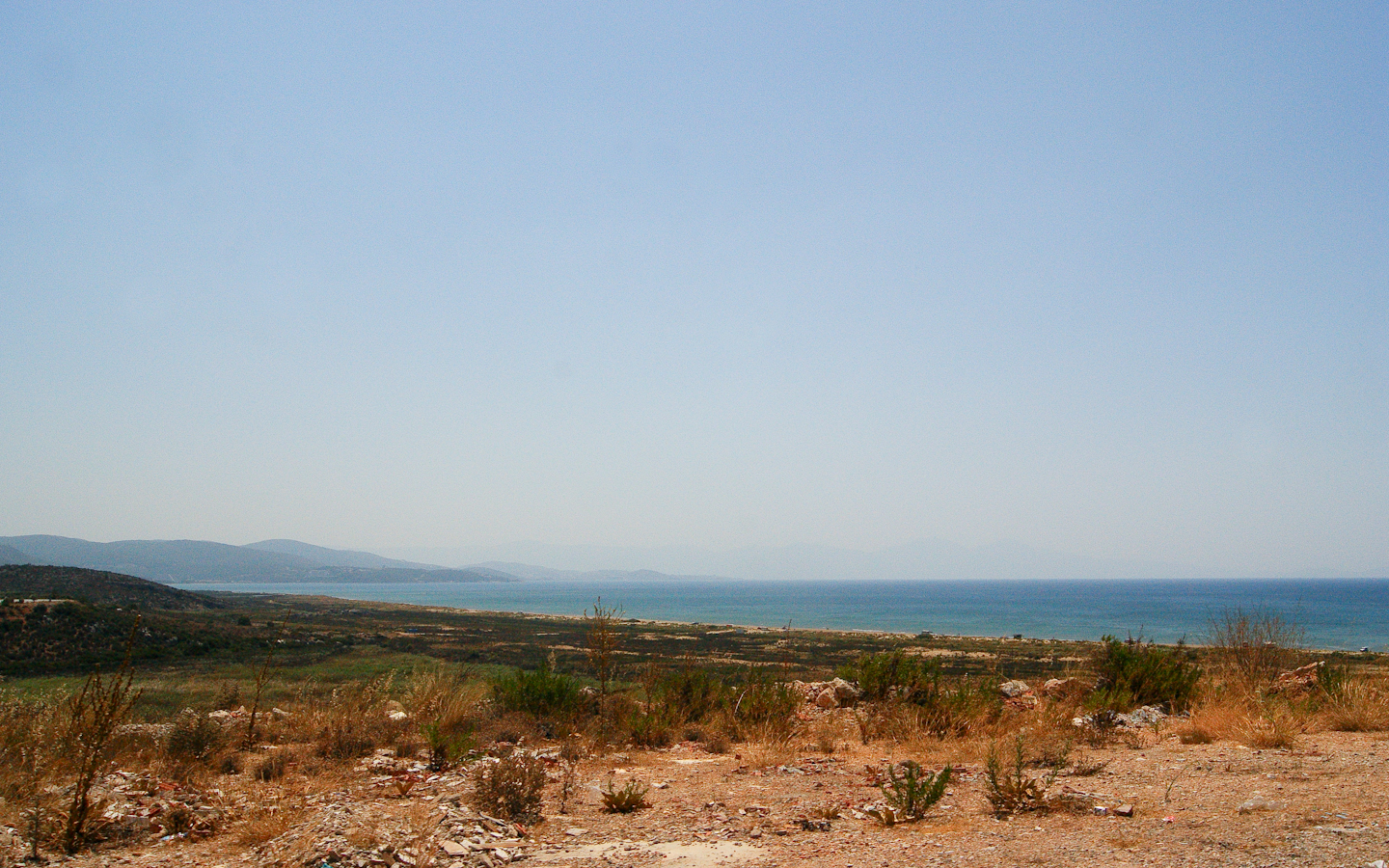
The landscape and coast of Özdere

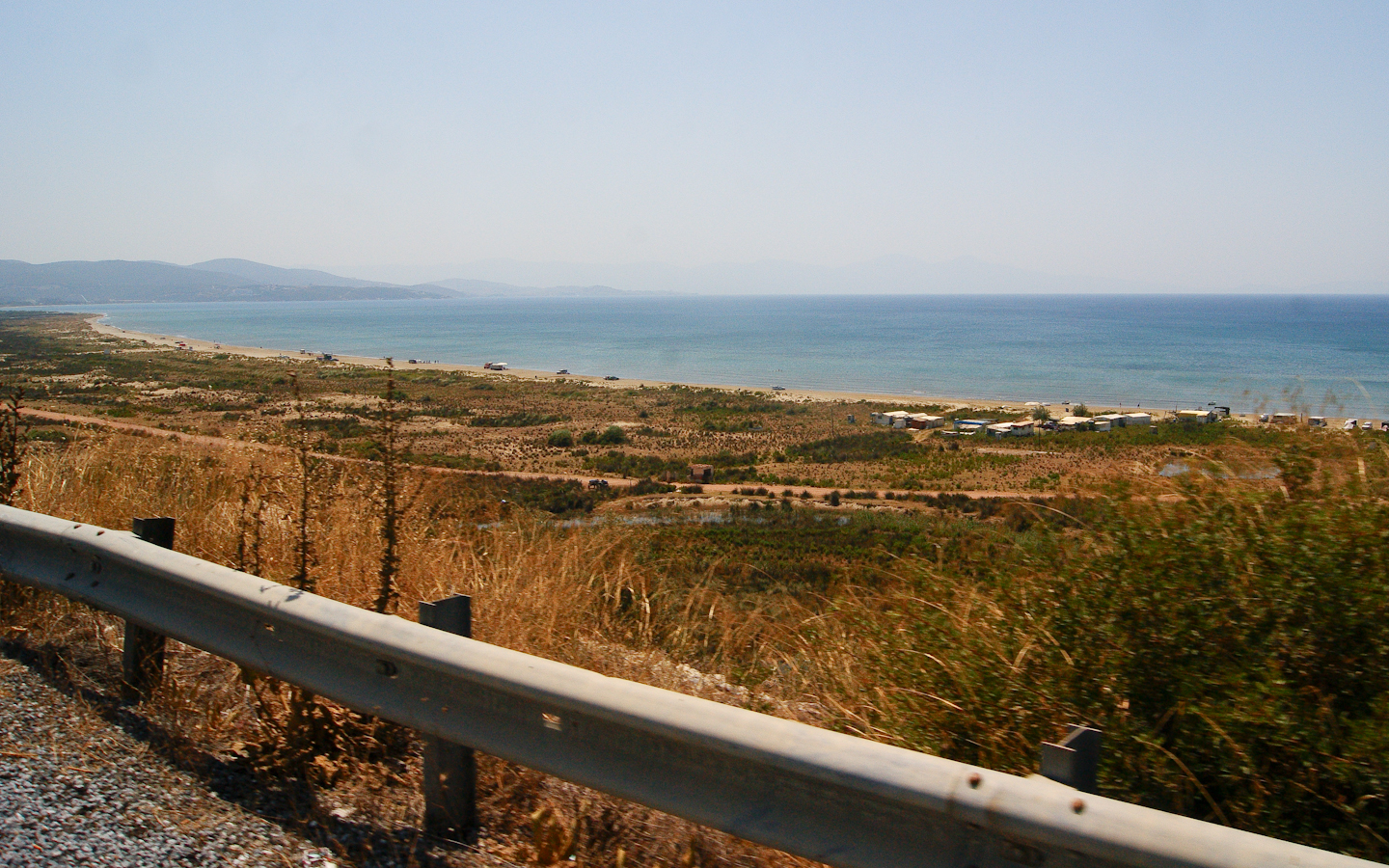
Özdere's coast viewed from a road edge

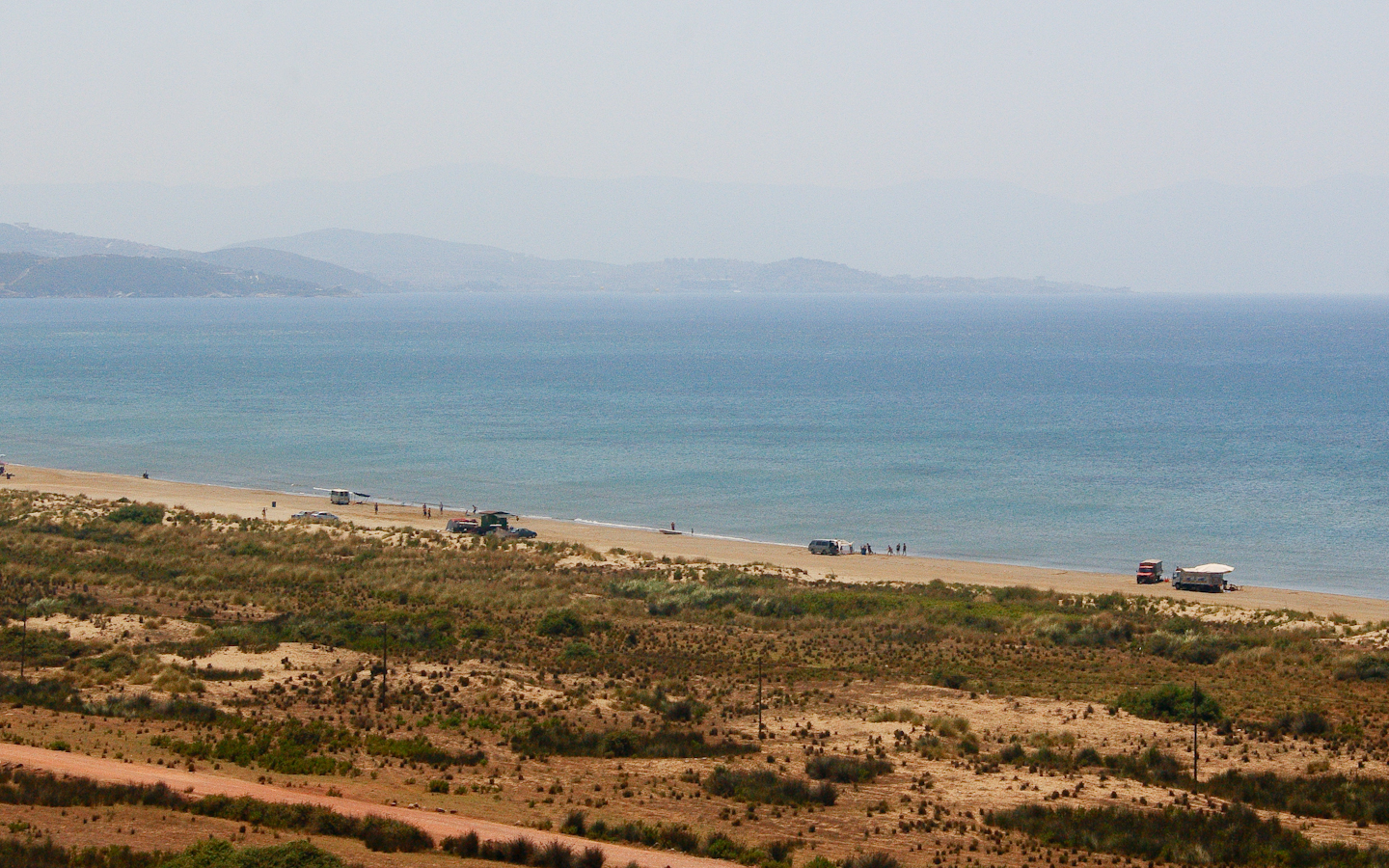
The beach of Özdere

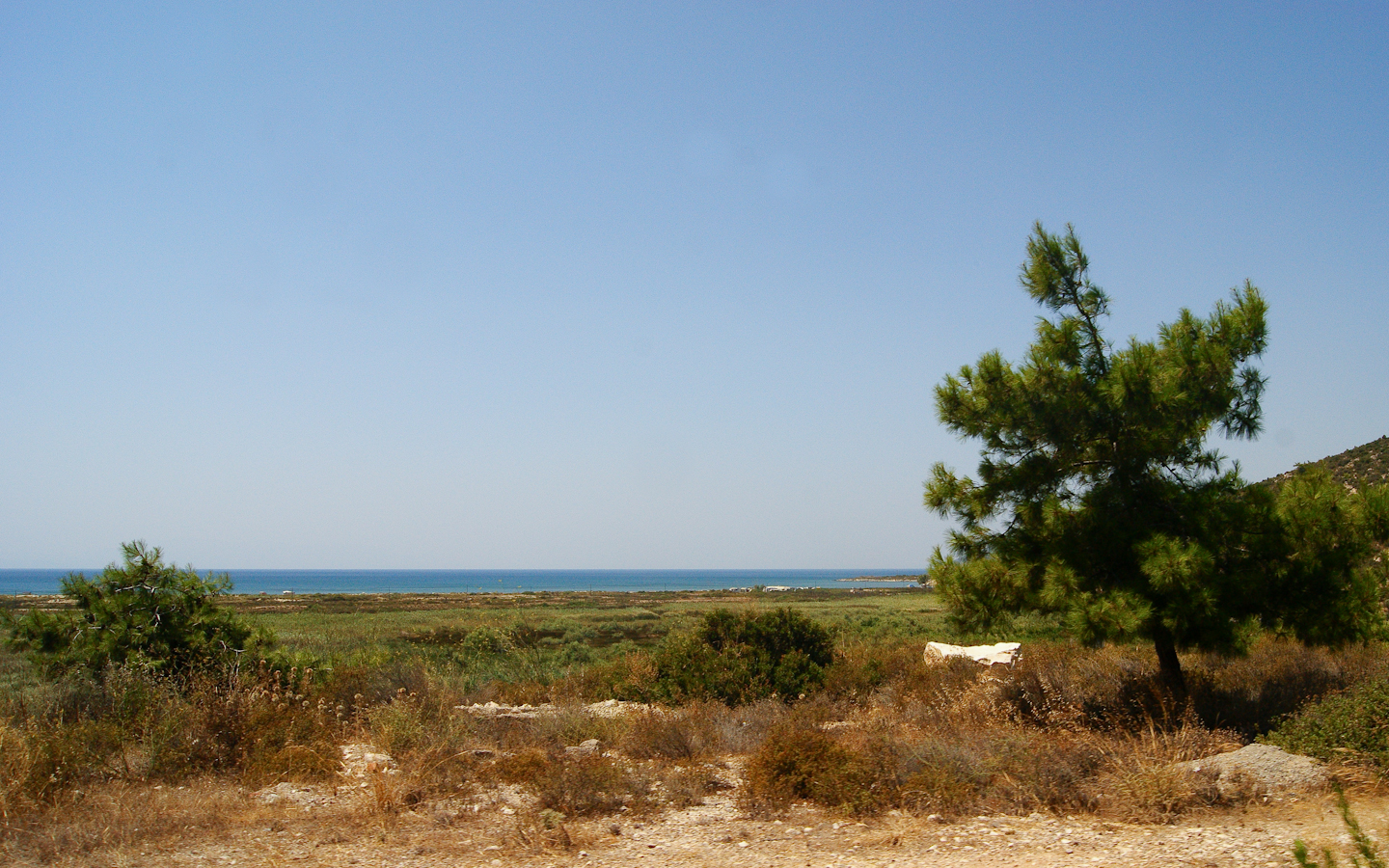
A tree on one of Özdere's hills

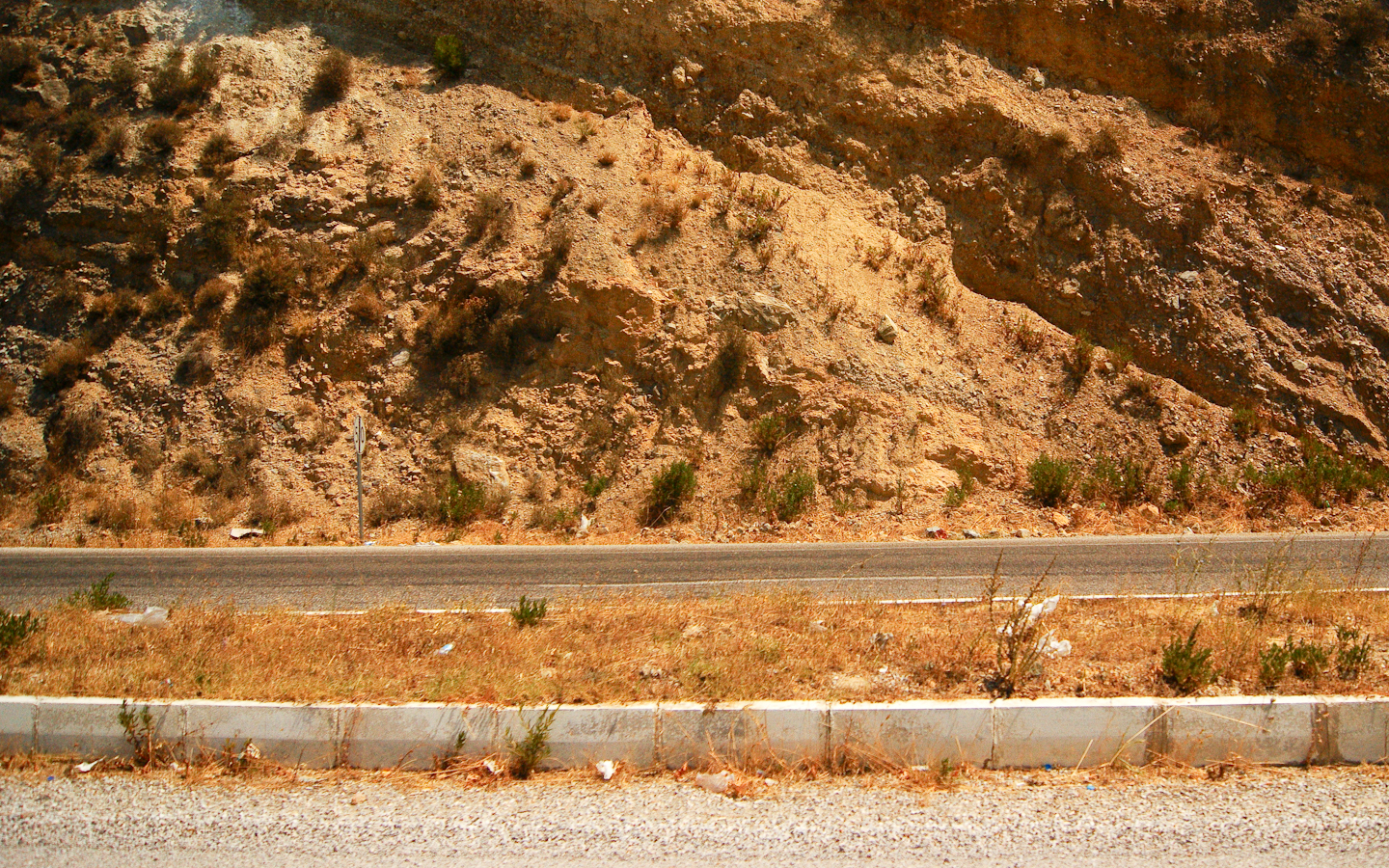
The rocks along a road near town

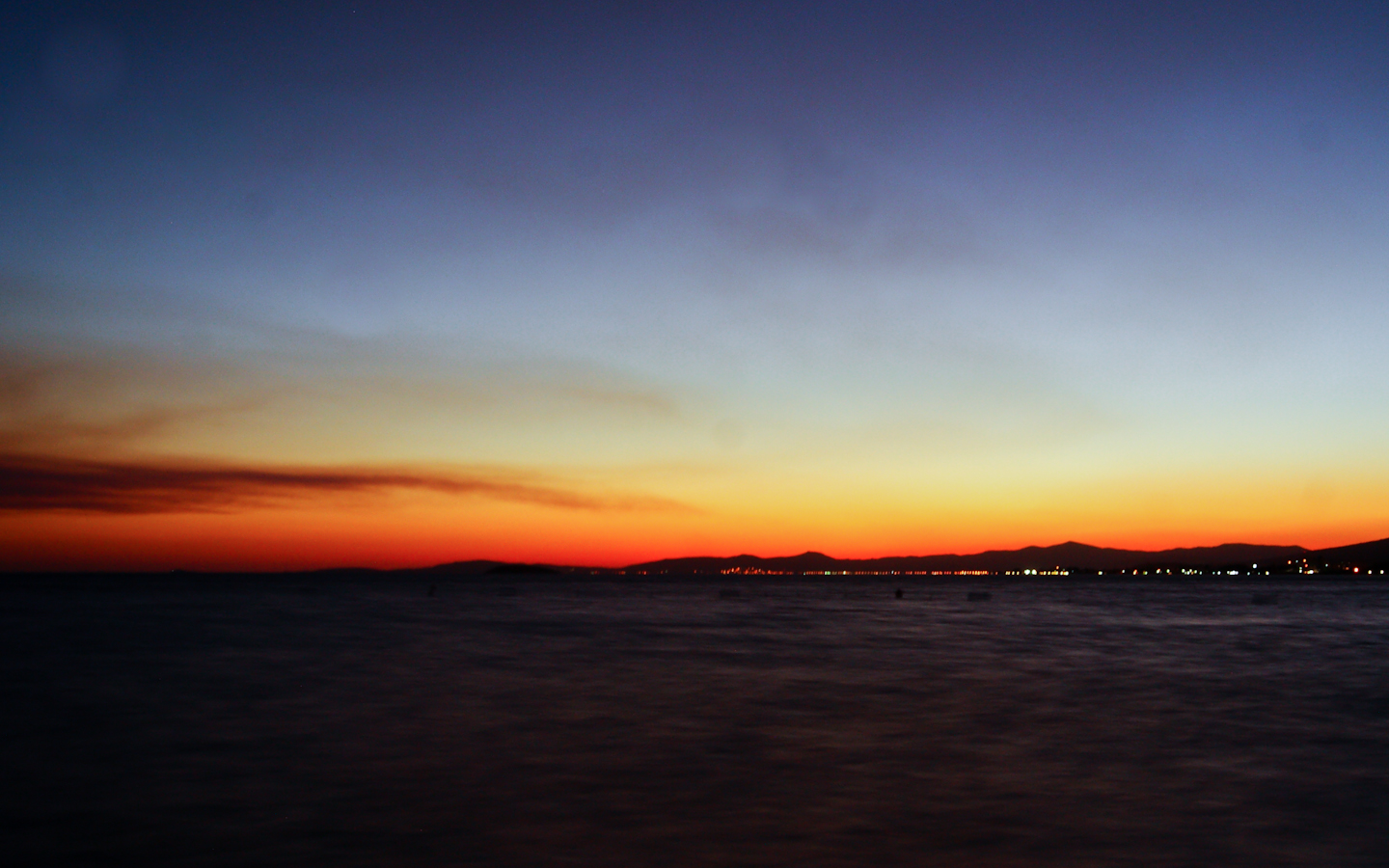
Özdere at twilight
