= Efemçukuru =

- Neighbourhood
- Location in Turkey Efemçukuru (İzmir)
- Coordinates: 38°17′N 26°58′E
- Country: Turkey
- Province: İzmir
- District: Menderes
- Elevation: 665 m (2,182 ft)
- Population (2022): 452
- Time zone: UTC+3 (TRT)
- Postal code: 35471
- Area code: 0232

Efemçukuru is a neighbourhood in the municipality and district of Menderes, İzmir Province, Turkey. Its population is 452 (2022). It is 48 kilometres (30 mi) to the south of İzmir. Main agricultural product is olive. The village has also specialised in organic farming. Efemçukuru used to be a forest village. But beginning by 2008, the forests around the village are assigned to a Canadian company, Eldorado Gold, for gold mining.
