= September 2012 Baradan Bay, Turkey, migrant boat disaster =

Fatal boat accident

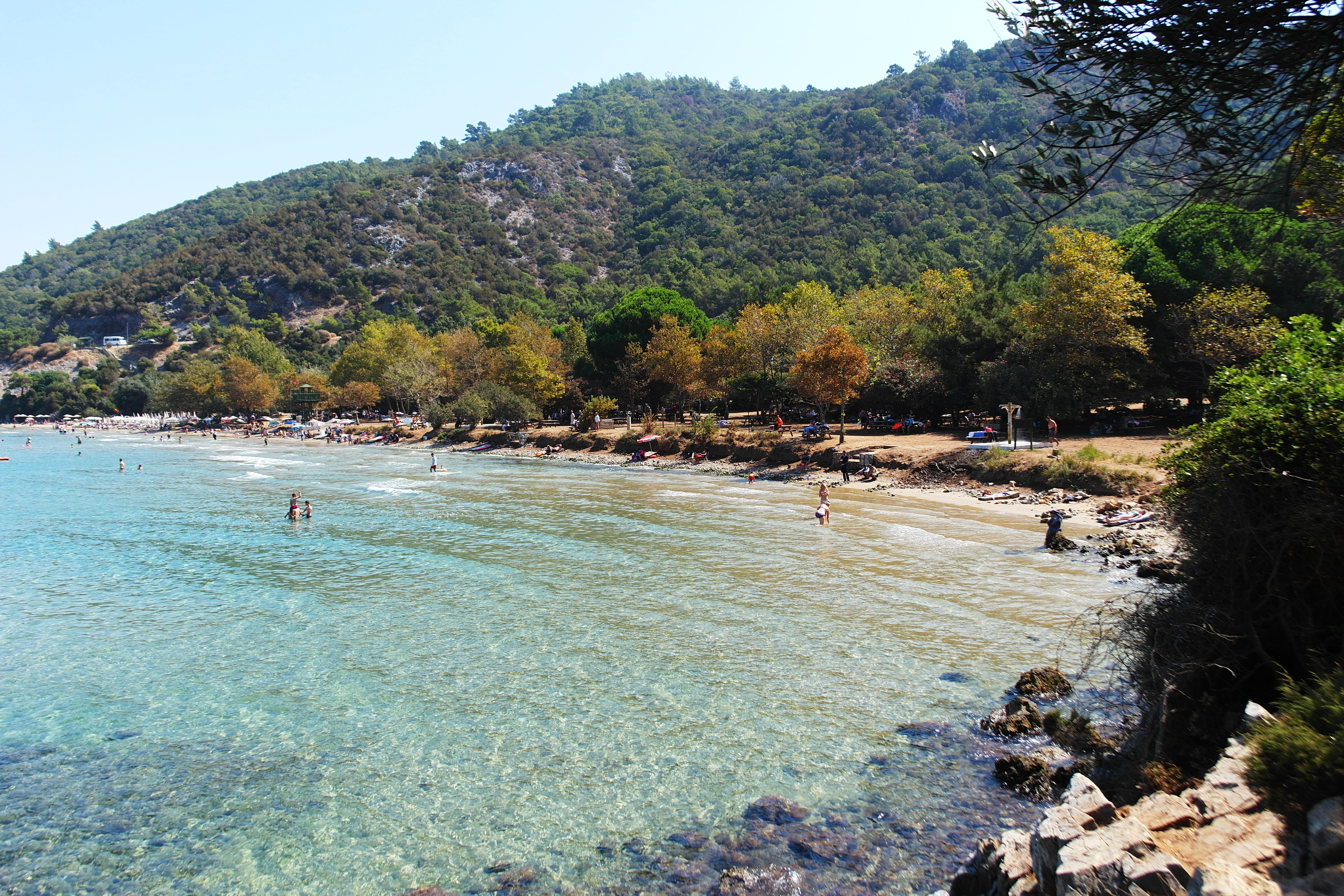
- Mediterranean coast in Menderes, Turkey.
- Date: September 6, 2012
- Time: 05:30 EDT (02:30 UTC)
- Location: Baradan Bay, İzmir Province, Turkey; 37.98155°N 27.23373°E
- Cause: Boat hit rocks
- Participants: Illegal migrants from Middle East
- Outcome: Boat sank
- Deaths: 61
- Injuries: 48
- Suspects: 2

The September 2012 Baradan Bay, Turkey migrant boat disaster occurred in the early hours of September 6, 2012, in Baradan Bay, İzmir Province, western Turkey. A fishing boat carrying illegal migrants hit rocks and sank. 61 people died, 48 survived the incident.

The 12 m (39 ft) long fishing boat left the village of Ahmetbeyli in the Menderes district of İzmir Province at 5:30 AM heading for the island of Samos to enter Greece illegally. About 40–50 m (130–160 ft) off the coast, she hit rocks and sank in 7 m (23 ft) deep water. Media reports stated that some people were locked in the hold. The district governor said that the migrants were from Middle Eastern countries, and the 61 dead were 31 children, including three babies, 18 women, and eleven men. 33 Syrians, twelve Palestinians, one Iraqi and two Turks, being the organizer and the captain, survived the disaster. 46 of the survivors swam ashore while two others were rescued by law enforcement teams.

The dead bodies were transported to the forensic lab in İzmir, while the survivors were brought to a hospital in the district for medical checks. The two Turks were taken into custody.
