= Görece, Menderes =

Görece
- Neighbourhood
- Location in Turkey Görece (İzmir)
- Coordinates: 38°16′51″N 27°07′28″E
- Country: Turkey
- Province: İzmir
- District: Menderes
- Population (2022): 2,517
- Time zone: UTC+3 (TRT)
- Area code: 0232

Görece is a neighbourhood in the municipality and district of Menderes, İzmir Province, Turkey. Its population is 2,517 (2022). It is known for its production of eye beads (nazar). It was an independent municipality until it was merged into the municipality of Menderes in 2008.

Eye beads are produced in Görece and Kurudere (Kemalpaşa) villages near İzmir by a handful of craftsmen, who have devoted their lives to this art. The 3000-year-old antique Mediterranean glass art lives in these eye bead furnaces with its every detail.

The roots of the very few glass masters who still practise this age-old tradition goes back to the Arab artisans, who have settled in İzmir and its towns during the decline of the Ottoman Empire by the end of 19th century. The glass art that has lost its glamour in Anatolia, combining with the eye sign, was relived. The masters who practised their arts at Araphan and Kemeraltı, districts of İzmir, were exiled due to the smoke emissions from their furnaces and fire risks to the neighbourhood.
