= Menderes, İzmir =

Menderes
- District and municipality
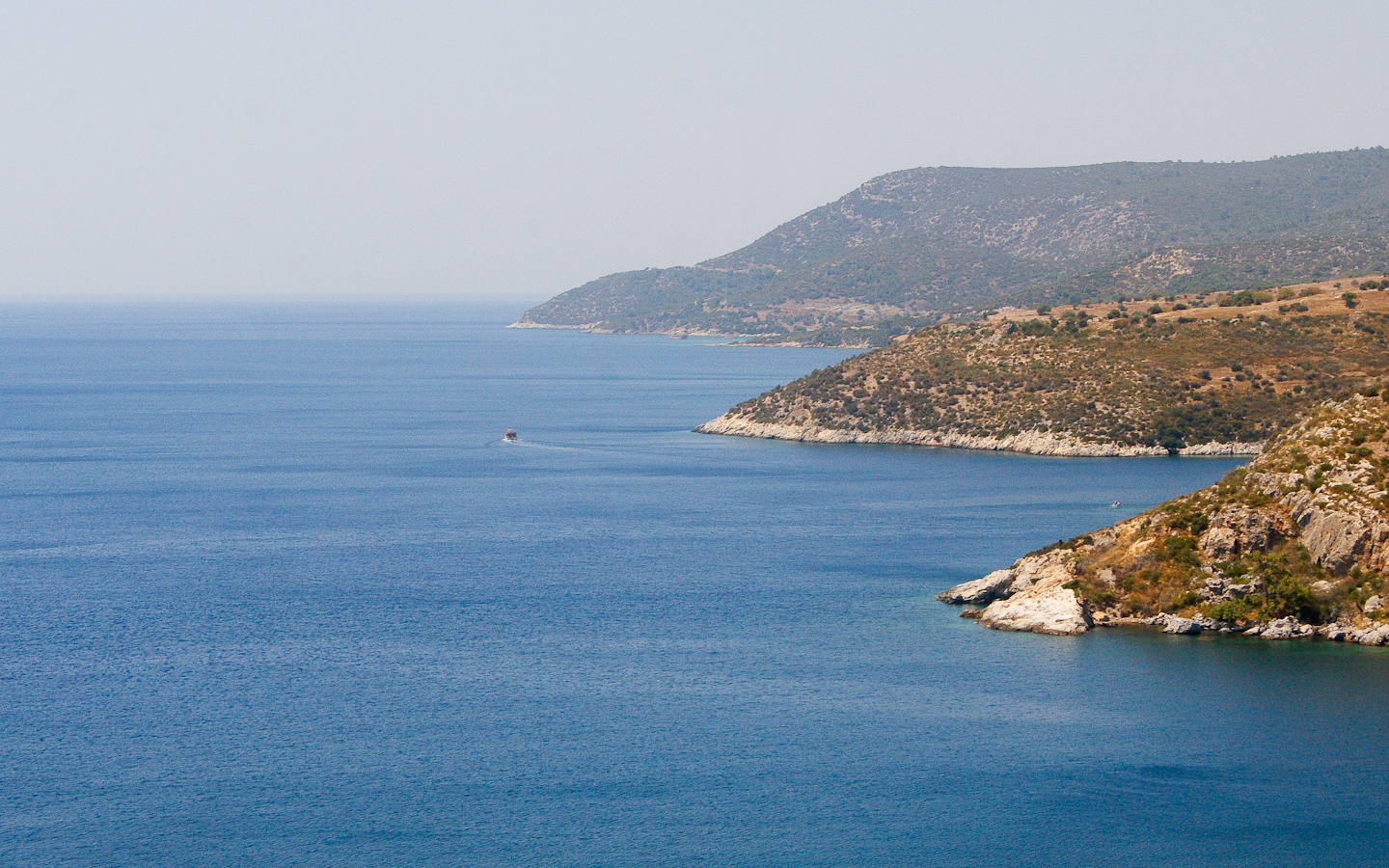
- The Aegean Sea from Menderes district

- Logo

- Map showing Menderes District in İzmir Province

- Location within Turkey Location within İzmir
- Coordinates: 38°15′14″N 27°08′02″E
- Country: Turkey
- Province: İzmir

Government
  - Mayor: İlkay Çiçek (CHP)
- Area: 777 km^{2} (300 sq mi)
- Population (2022): 106,173
  - Density: 137/km^{2} (354/sq mi)
- Time zone: UTC+3 (TRT)
- Area code: 0232
- Website: eski.menderes.bel.tr

Menderes is a municipality and district of İzmir Province, Turkey. Its area is 777 km^{2}, and its population is 106,173 (2022).

== Overview ==
Menderes district, which is notable for its satsumas, beautiful bays and historical riches, is 20 kilometres (12 miles) from İzmir. The ruins of Kolophon, Klaros and Notion, which are along the Menderes-Selçuk road are next to each other and make up the important archeological sites of the province. The region around Gümüldür produces the world-famous tangerine breed of satsumas. Özdere is one of the important tourism resorts of the Aegean coast. Beads of various colors and shapes which are produced by the locals in Görece village are particularly of note. The area was called Cumaovası and was a township in the Konak (Centre) district before it became a district in 1988.

== Composition ==
There are 44 neighbourhoods in Menderes District:

- Ahmetbeyli
- Akçaköy
- Altıntepe
- Ata
- Ataköy
- Barbaros
- Bulgurca
- Çakaltepe
- Çamönü
- Çatalca
- Çile
- Çileme
- Çukuraltı
- Cüneytbey
- Değirmendere
- Dereköy
- Develi
- Efemçukuru
- Gazipaşa
- Gölcükler
- Gölova
- Görece Cumhuriyet
- Gümüldür Atatürk
- Gümüldür Cumhuriyet
- Gümüldür Fevziçakmak
- Gümüldür İnönü
- Hürriyet
- Karakuyu
- Kasımpaşa
- Keler
- Kemalpaşa
- Kısık
- Küner
- Kuyucak
- Mithat Paşa
- Oğlananası Atatürk
- Oğlananası Cumhuriyet
- Orta
- Özdere Cumhuriyet
- Sancaklı
- Şaşal
- Tekeli Atatürk
- Tekeli Fevzi Çakmak
- Yeniköy

== Climate ==
Climate data for Menderes, normals 2000–2023)
Month	Jan	Feb	Mar	Apr	May	Jun	Jul	Aug	Sep	Oct	Nov	Dec	Year
Average precipitation mm (inches)	156.3 (6.15)	112.21 (4.42)	75.43 (2.97)	46.06 (1.81)	27.6 (1.09)	15.35 (0.60)	3.03 (0.12)	2.91 (0.11)	18.76 (0.74)	50.01 (1.97)	95.85 (3.77)	129.07 (5.08)	732.58 (28.83)
Average precipitation days (≥ 0.1mm)	11.67	10.38	9.21	7.5	5.71	3.29	0.71	0.75	2.75	4.71	8.67	11.67	77.02
Average snowy days	1.08	1	0.21	0	0	0	0	0	0	0	0.08	0.42	2.79
Source: Meteomanz

== See also ==
- September 2012 Baradan Bay, Turkey migrant boat disaster
