= Bulgurca =

Village in Izmir, Turkey

- Neighbourhood
- Location in Turkey Bulgurca (İzmir)
- Coordinates: 38°12′52″N 27°13′46″E
- Country: Turkey
- Province: İzmir
- District: Menderes
- Population (2022): 2,024
- Time zone: UTC+3 (TRT)
- Area code: 0232

Bulgurca is a neighborhood in the municipality and district of Menderes, İzmir Province, Turkey. Its population is 2,024 (2022). It was relocated around 1997.

== History ==
Formerly a centrally located rural village, Bulgurca was well-equipped with a health center, primary and secondary schools, a wide array of shops and trades, and a strong farming community.

By the end of 1997, Bulgurca was demolished for the Tahtali Dam project. Residents, along with those living in nearby villages, were relocated to the Pancar plains, approximately 5 km away from the original location at 38°9′35″N 27°8′44″E.

Bulgurca was also the location of the Bakla Tepe excavation site.

== Notable people ==
- Haris Alexiou, a Greek singer, was born to an Anatolian Greek family who migrated in 1924 from Bulgurca.

== Bulgurca in media ==
A European Union committee of 18 educators once visited Bulgurca Primary School.
