= Rupert Neudeck =

German journalist

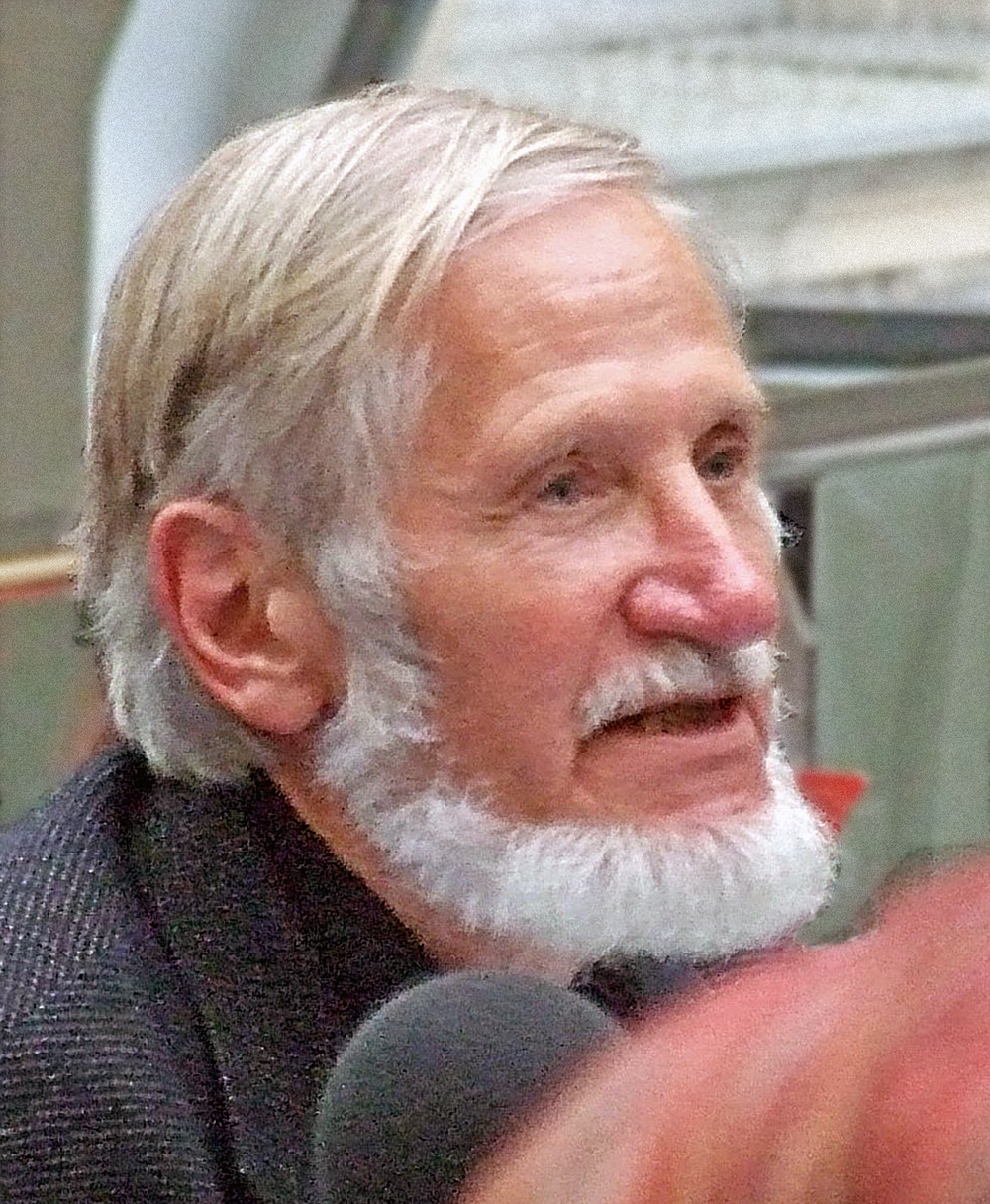
- Rupert Neudeck, Frankfurt 2007
- Born: 14 May 1939; Danzig, Free City of Danzig (Gdańsk)
- Died: 31 May 2016 (aged 77)
- Known for: Cap Anamur

Rupert Neudeck (German: [ˈnɔʏdɛk]; 14 May 1939 – 31 May 2016) was a German theologian, journalist and aid worker, especially with refugees.

He started as a correspondent for Deutschlandfunk, a German public broadcaster. Later, he focused on assisting those fleeing conflict, and assisted thousands of refugees from Vietnam in the late 1970s. Neudeck was a winner of numerous awards, including the Theodor Heuss Medal, the Bruno Kreisky Prize for Services to Human Rights, the Erich Kaestner Award and the Walter Dirks Award, and was co-founder of both the Cap Anamur and Grünhelme (Green Helmets) humanitarian organizations.

== Early life and education ==
Neudeck was born in Danzig, then the Free City of Danzig (now Gdańsk, Poland), and lived in Danzig-Langfuhr (now Wrzeszcz) until 1945. In the final months of World War II, when large numbers of German civilians were being evacuated from eastern Germany, his family had received tickets for the passenger ship MV Wilhelm Gustloff, which left Gdingen (now Gdynia) on 31 January 1945 and was sunk by a Soviet submarine with huge loss of life. The Neudecks missed the sailing, which probably saved their lives.

He studied various subjects in West Germany, including law and Catholic theology. He gained a Ph.D. in theology with a thesis titled “Political Ethics in Jean-Paul Sartre and Albert Camus”. Neudeck decided to work in journalism, first as a student editor at the University of Münster, then professionally for Catholic radio. In 1977 Neudeck became a correspondent for Deutschlandfunk.

== Humanitarian work ==
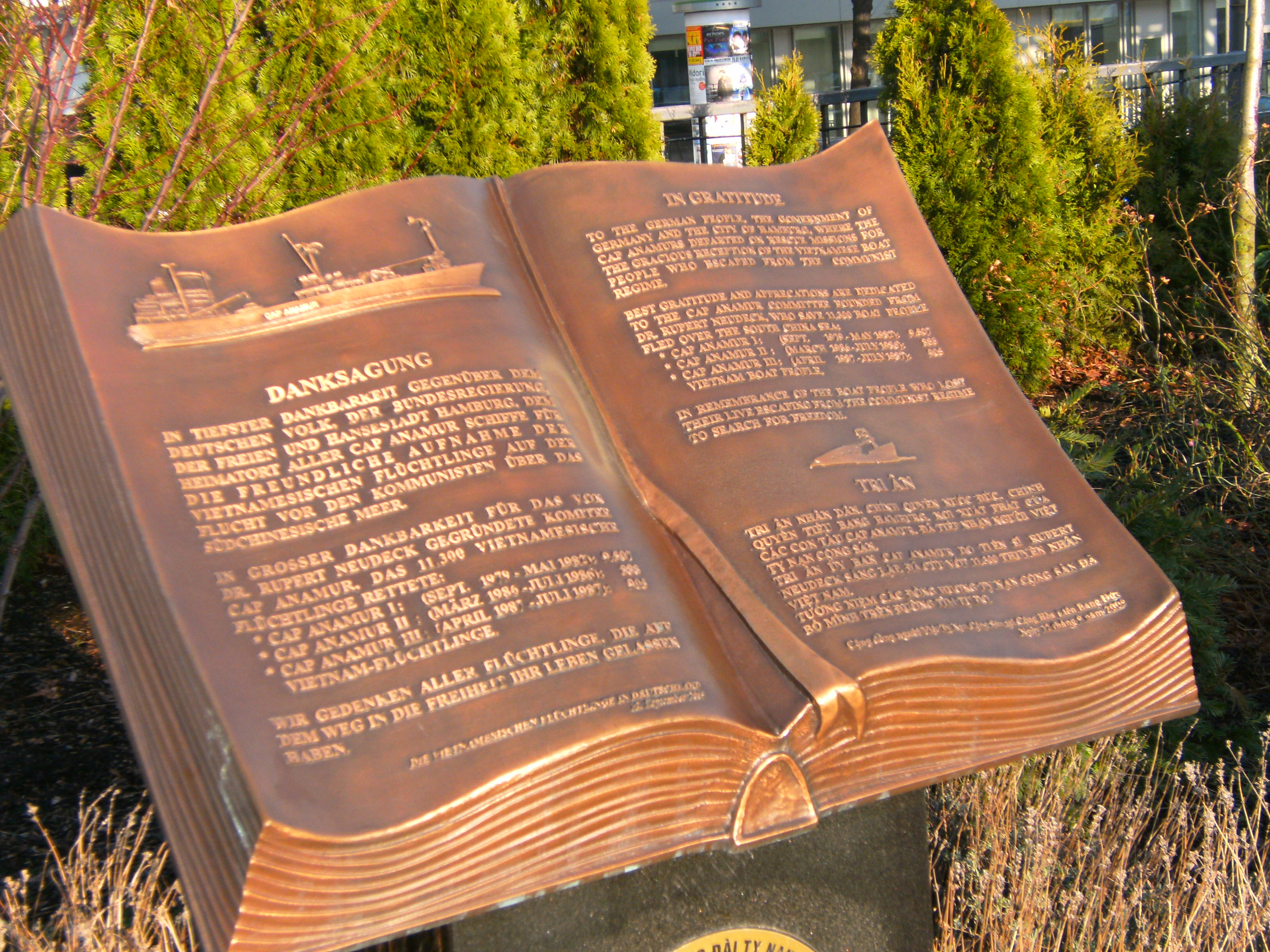
Memorial in Hamburg, Germany, from Vietnamese boat people, giving thanks to the Cap Anamur.

In 1979, Rupert Neudeck and his wife Christel, along with a group of friends, formed the committee "A ship for Vietnam" and chartered the commercial freighter Cap Anamur for a rescue mission to Southeast Asia. The mission eventually saved more than 10,000 Vietnamese boat people fleeing Vietnam after the war.

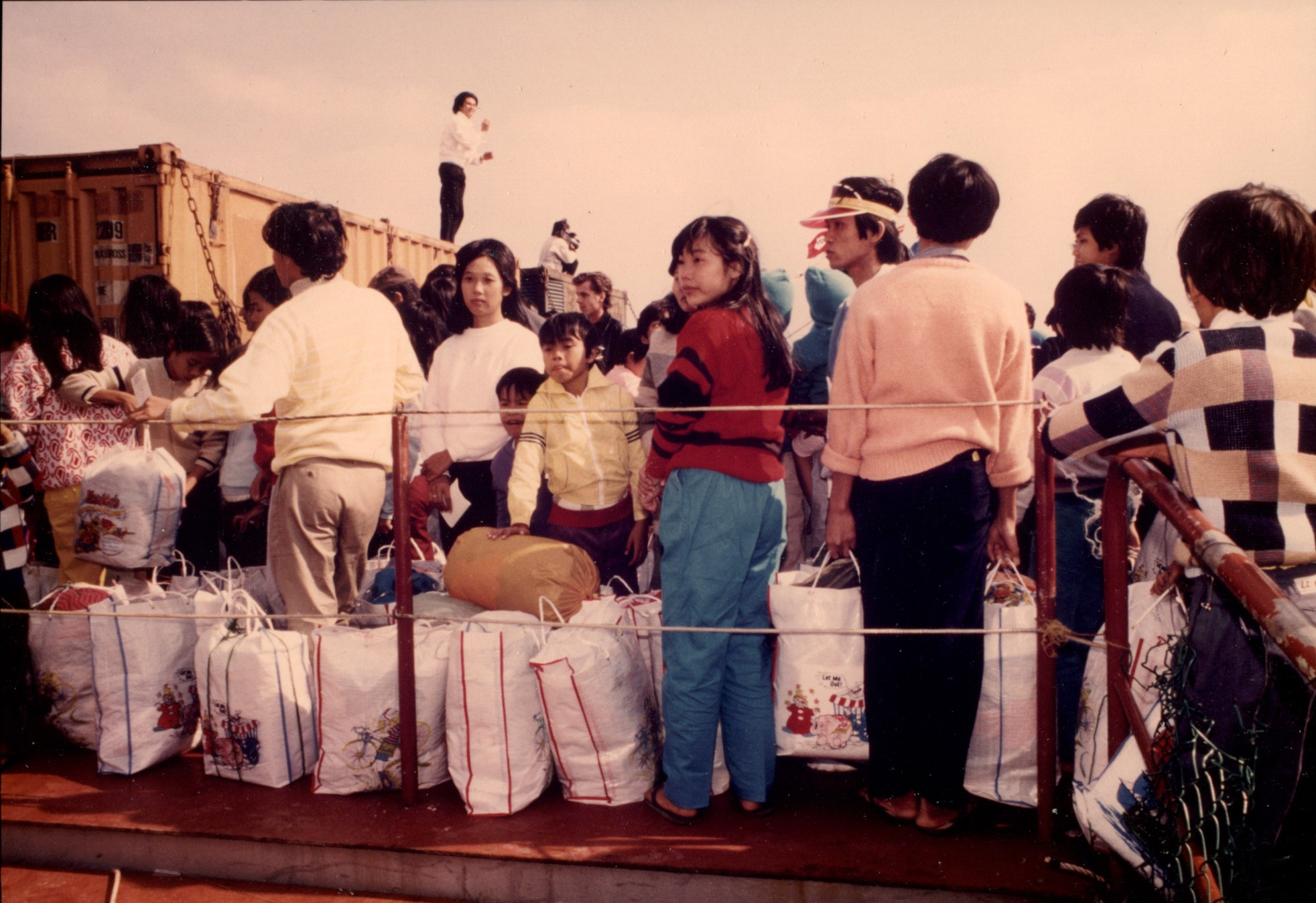
Refugees from Vietnam on the Cap Anamur II in 1986 in Hamburg.

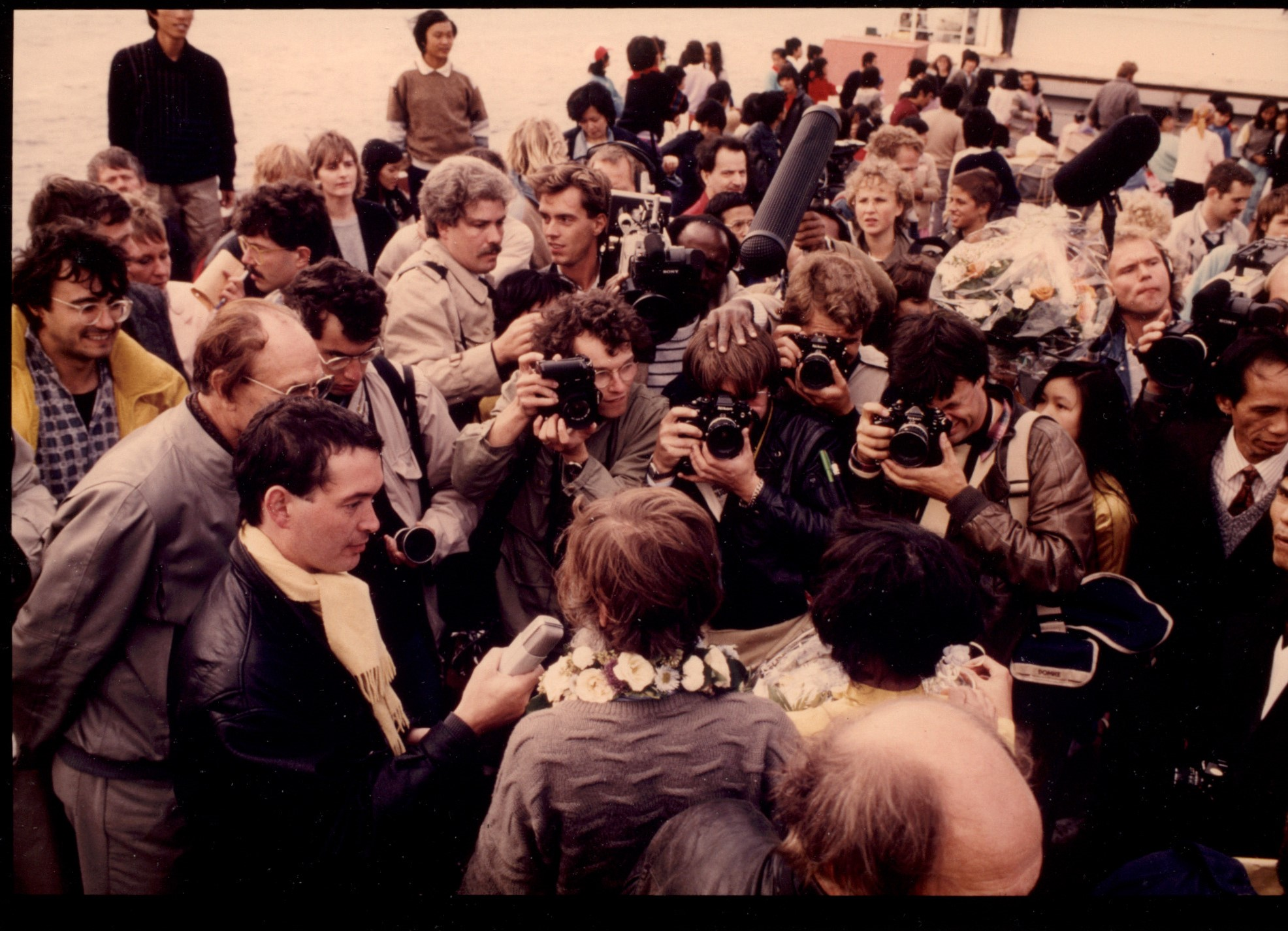
Media greeting Rupert Neudeck on the Cap Anamur II in 1986 in Hamburg.

Following the Cap Anamur missions, he continued his humanitarian work on various other projects that aided refugees. The Green Helmets (Grünhelme) Association, founded in 2003, is dedicated to rebuilding schools, villages, and medical services in various war-torn regions, particularly those in Islamic countries. Neudeck founded the organization with together with Aiman Mazyek, the than chairman of the Central Council of Muslims in Germany. The organization describes itself as politically neutral, cross-national and cross-religious, but also advocates for dialogue between Christians and Muslims.More recently, he worked to aid Syrian refugees. He was listed on Unsere Besten ("Our Best"), a German poll similar to 100 Greatest Britons.

In 2005, Neudeck was featured in an interview on the Vietnamese entertainment show Paris By Night 77, which commemorated the 30th anniversary of the fall of Saigon and the work of the Cap Anamur Committee. Neudeck's humanitarian efforts continued up to the time of his death. Most recently he assisted with the emigration of refugees from Syria and Eritrea to Germany.

Rupert Neudeck was made a Knight of the Légion d'honneur on April 25, 2012, in Cologne.

In 2014 Neudeck received the Dr. Rainer Hildebrandt Human Rights Award endowed by Alexandra Hildebrandt. The award is given annually in recognition of extraordinary, non-violent commitment to human rights.

In 2015, the German drugstore chain dm planned to organize a fundraising campaign for a Kurdish community in Germany, supported by Rupert Neudeck. The planned campaign sparked outrage among nationalist German Turks. They accused dm of supporting the Kurdish PKK and terrorism and called for a boycott of dm. The company gave up, stating that it did not want to provide "a breeding ground for escalation."

== Death ==
Neudeck died on 31 May 2016, from complications after heart surgery, aged 77.

== Publications ==
- 2013: Es gibt ein Leben nach Assad. Syrisches Tagebuch. (There is life after Assad. Syrian Diary). C.H.Beck ISBN 978-3-406-65444-2
