= Cap Anamur =

Humanitarian organisation

Cap Anamur / German Emergency Doctors
- Formation: January 2, 1979; 47 years ago
- Type: Aid agency
- Purpose: Humanitarian aid Development aid
- Headquarters: Bonn, Germany
- Region served: Worldwide
- Official language: English, German
- President: Bernd Göken
- Website: www.cap-anamur.org

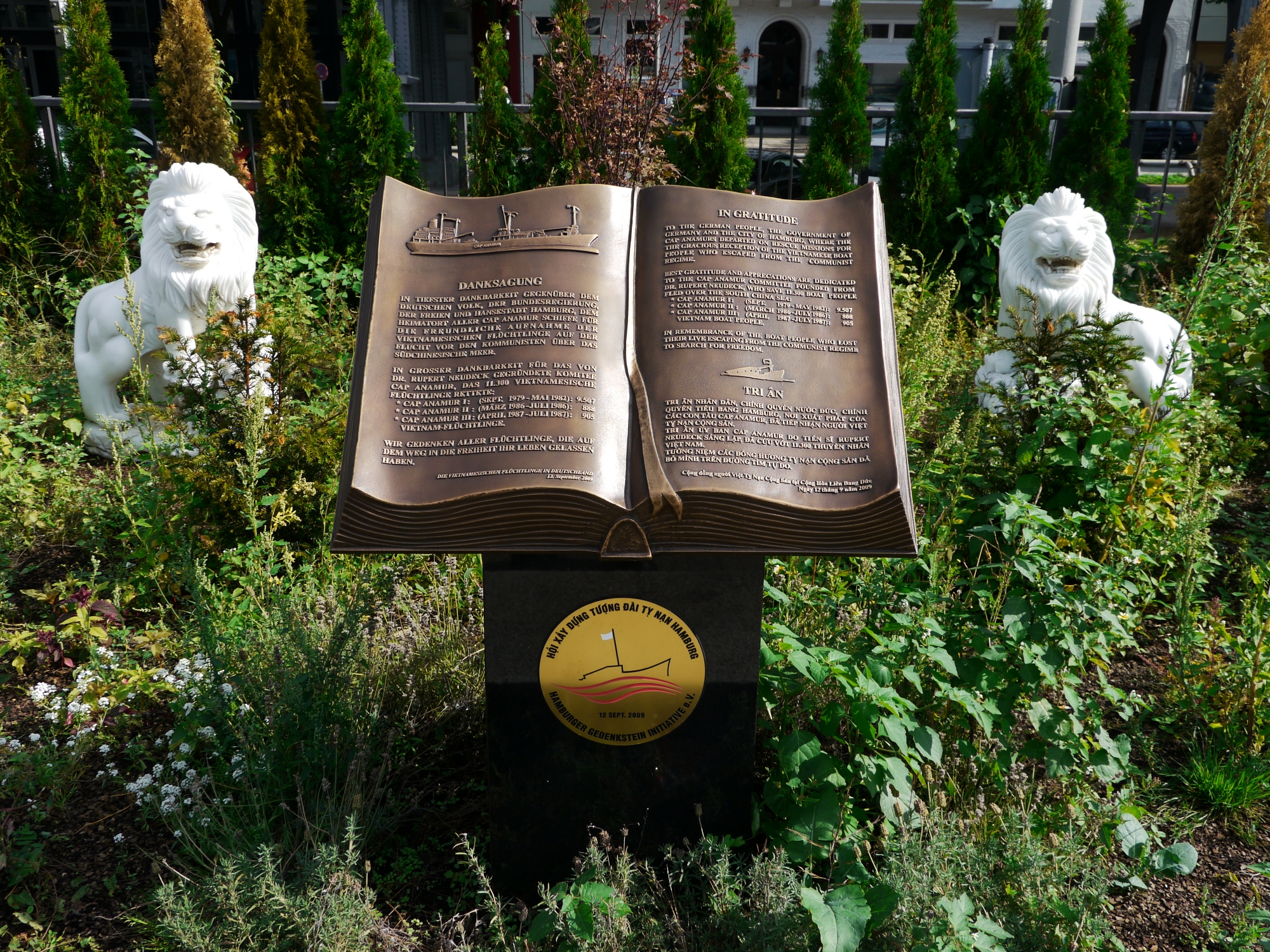
A memorial in Hamburg, the city from which the Cap Anamur sailed, erected by the rescued Vietnamese refugees expressing their gratitude in German, English, and Vietnamese.

Cap Anamur (official: Cap Anamur / German Emergency Doctors) is a humanitarian organisation with the goal of helping refugees and displaced people worldwide.

== History ==
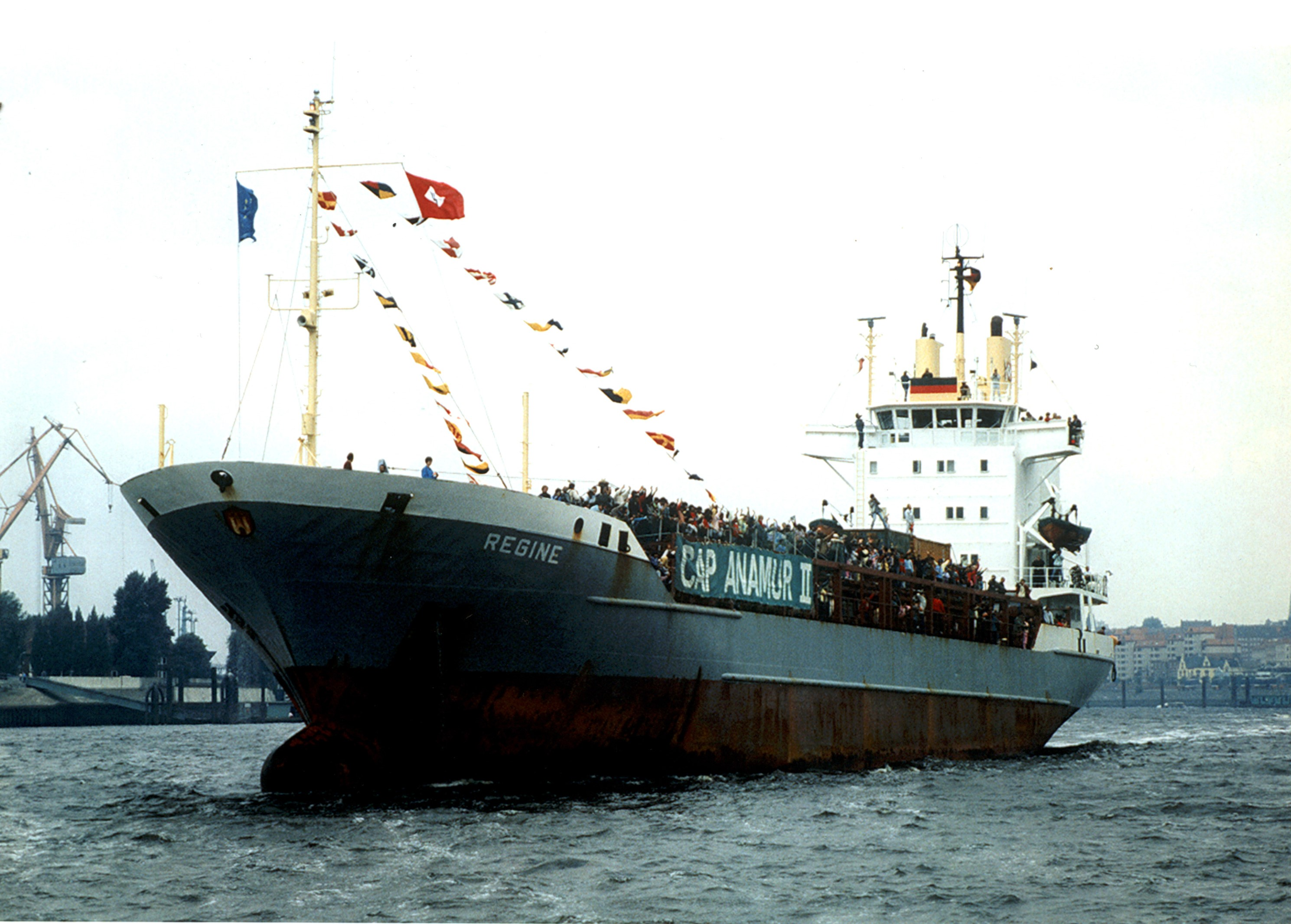
Cap Anamur II arriving in Hamburg, 1986

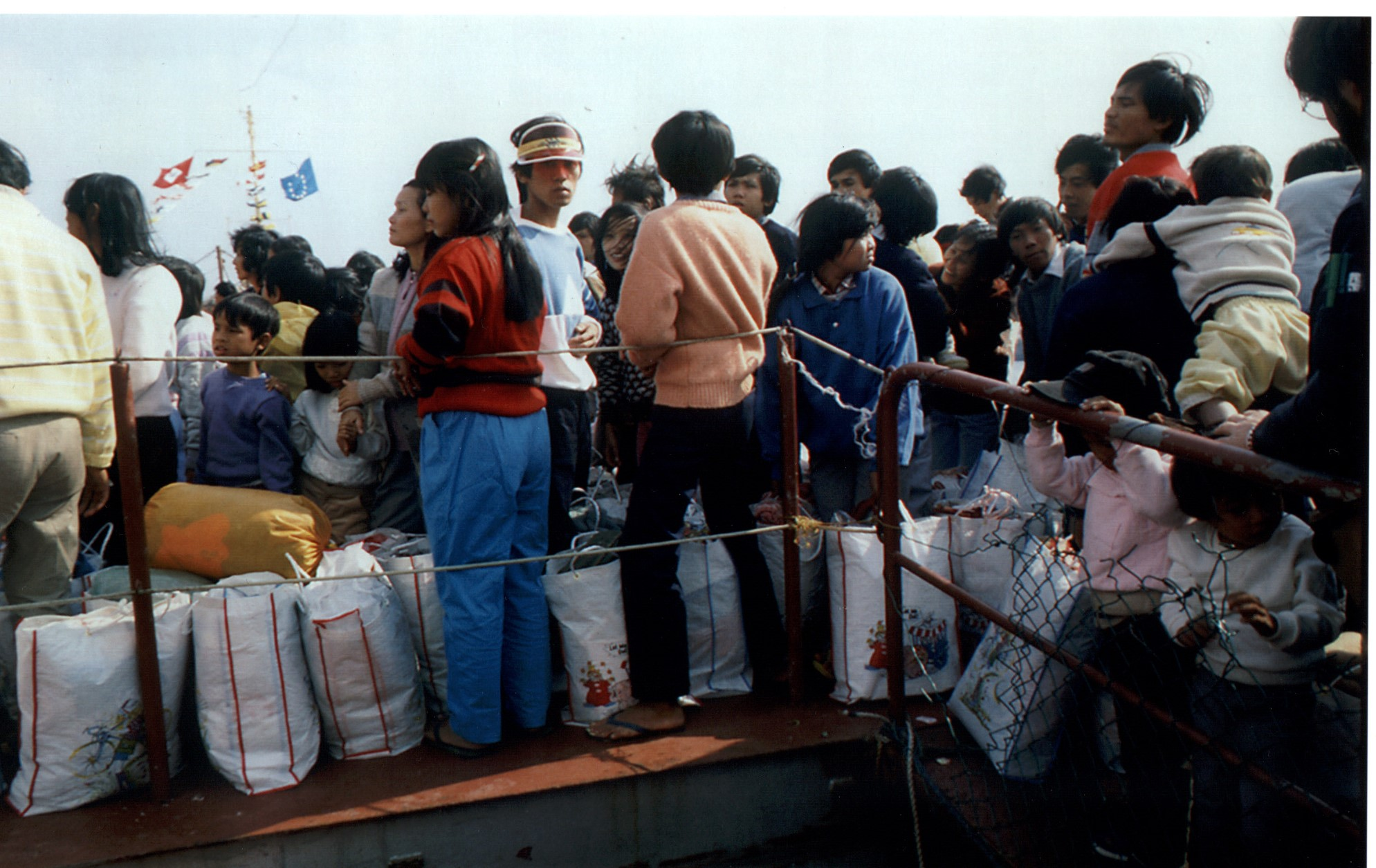
Refugees from Vietnam on Cap Anamur II arriving in Hamburg, 1986

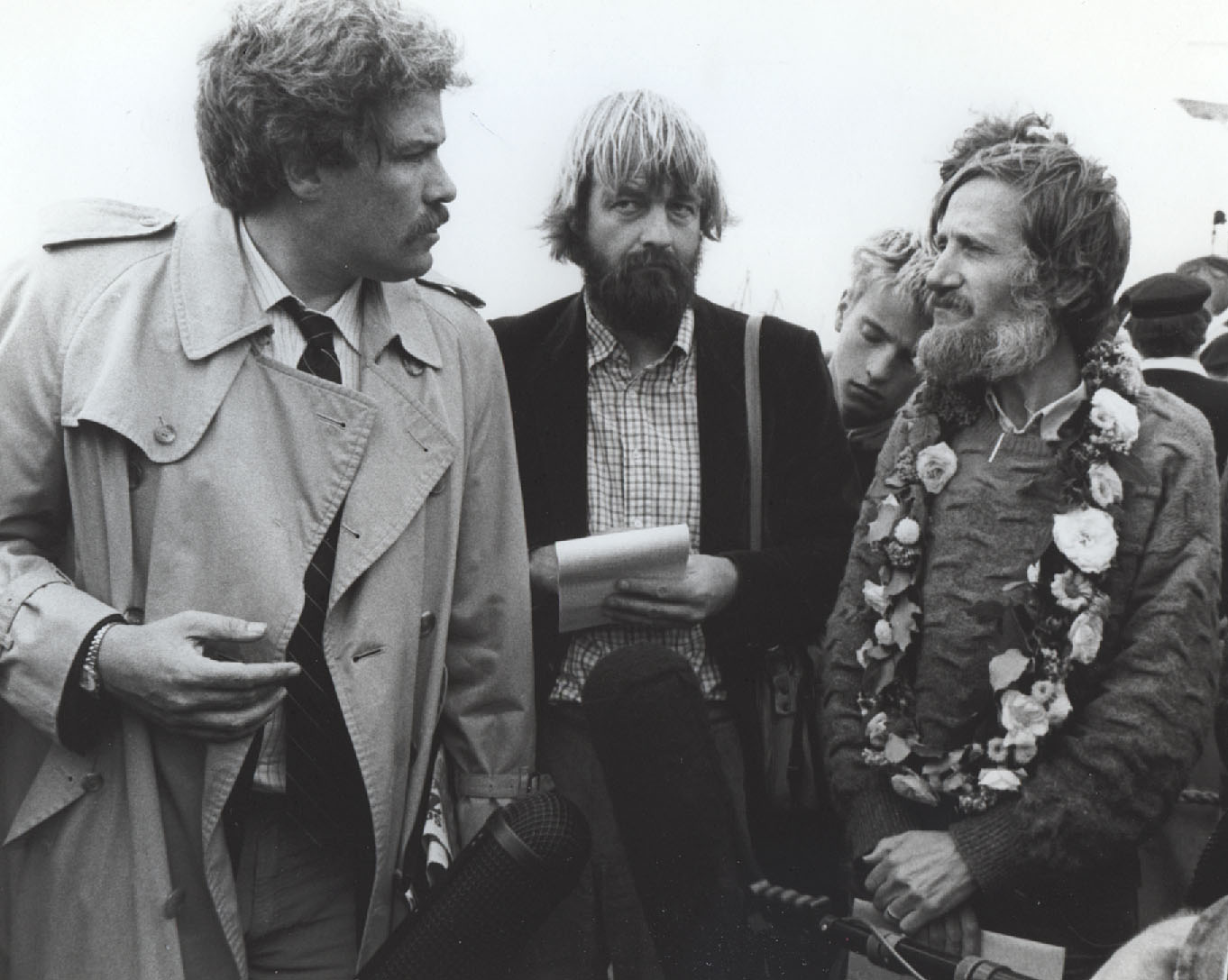
CNN correspondent Jim Clancy with Rupert Neudeck (right) in Hamburg, Germany, 1986

In 1979, amidst the rising number of Vietnamese boat people fleeing Vietnam in unseaworthy craft, Christel and Rupert Neudeck along with a group of friends formed the committee "A ship for Vietnam" to rescue the refugees. For the rescue mission, the group chartered the freighter Cap Anamur, named after the French designation for Cape Anamur, a cape on the Turkish Mediterranean coast near the city of Anamur that marks the southernmost point of Anatolia. The journeys of Cap Anamur (and her two sister ships afterwards) were, against the predictions of many pundits a huge success: 10,375 boat people were rescued at sea and an additional 35,000 were medically treated.

Following its establishment to assist Vietnamese boat people, Cap Anamur has expanded to have projects in 62 countries, including, historically:

- Angola
- Chechnya
- Colombia
- Congo
- Haiti
- Indonesia
- Iraq
- Ivory Coast
- Kenya
- Kosovo
- Liberia
- Madagascar
- Mozambique
- Nepal
- North Korea
- Pakistan
- Philippines
- Serbia
- Syria
- Somalia
- Uganda

As of 2025, the association lists current projects in:

- Syria
- Ukraine
- Afghanistan
- Bangladesh
- Lebanon
- Mozambique
- Sierra Leone
- Sudan
- Central African Republic

Today the projects, which are funded by private donations, also focus on continuing education for local medical personnel and construction projects to repair medical facilities and schools.

=== Neudeck's later work ===
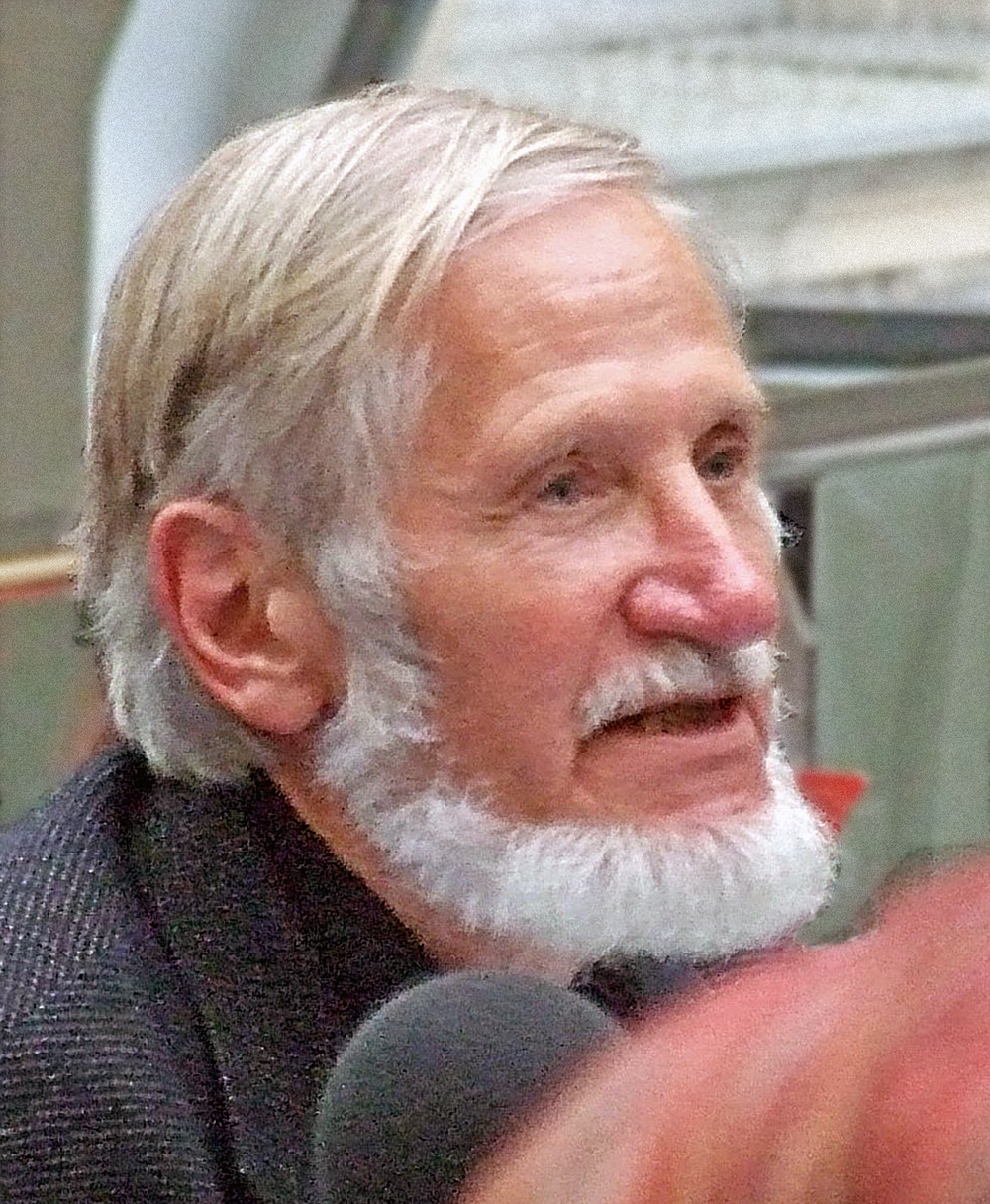
Rupert Neudeck in Frankfurt, 2007

After co-founding Cap Anamur, Neudeck founded the Gernman aid organization "Grünhelme (Green Helmets)" together with Aiman Mazyek, then chairman of the Central Council of Muslims in Germany in 2003. The organization describes itself as politically neutral, cross-national and cross-religious, but also advocates for dialogue between Christians and Muslims.

Rupert Neudeck was made a Knight of the Légion d’honneur on April 25, 2012, in Cologne.

== Impounding in Sicily ==
In 2004, the association's ship Cap Anamur became the centre of attention in international media after rescuing 37 refugees from North Africa whose boat was sinking. While crossing the Mediterranean for the Suez Canal it made the rescue, then after three weeks between the borders of the territorial waters of Italy and Malta, several of those who had been rescued threatened to throw themselves overboard. The captain set out for the Italian coast, applying for an exceptional permit to dock, citing a situation of imminent danger on board. However, Italy refused him asylum, arguing that under international maritime law, the ship should have disembarked its shipwrecked in Malta, the first country where the vessel had docked, before sailing to Sicily. At the landing in Porto Empedocle (Agrigento), the African asylum-seekers were sent to a detention centre where their cases were examined individually, but their cases were described as 'without hope', in particular because 'the files are not complete because the applicants have not received adequate legal assistance', and the Italian police jointly arrested Elias Bierdel (director of the Cap Anamur association), as well as Captain Stefan Schmidt. They were considered to have been caught red-handed assisting the entry of illegal immigrants into Italian territory. The ship was impounded.

Several charges were not upheld by the court, but the offense alleged by the prosecutor of "supporting illegal immigration," with aggravated circumstances, resulted in a four-year prison sentence and a €400,000 fine for the three defendants (Elias Bierdel, Stefan Schmidt, and Vladimir Dashkevitce). The arrest generated diplomatic tension between Germany and Italy, which likely led to the conditional release of the three defendants after five days in prison, but the trial continued.

After 30 hearings and more than 40 witnesses heard in sessions spread over 5 years of trial, the Agrigento court finally acquitted the 3 accused in 2009, recognizing that the facts considered did not constitute a crime: anyone who carries out a rescue operation at sea, by disembarking shipwrecked people in a "safe port" does not commit a crime. In terms of jurisprudence, this judgment establishes that States must respect the international law of the sea, including the positive obligations of rescue and the prohibition of collective expulsions. This decision also validates the "principle of non-refoulement" which is one of the foundations of the Geneva Convention. The court considered that on board, no one other than the captain can identify the most suitable port for the disembarkation of people rescued in distress. Following this landing and the resulting trial, the Italian Court also declared the "constitutional illegitimacy" of the provision of the "Fini-Bossi Law" providing for the expulsion by a magistrate of an illegal immigrant whose right to defense had not been guaranteed. It also considered a provision that made mandatory the arrest of an immigrant who had not respected the five-day deadline set by the authorities to leave the country to be invalid.
