= 2004 in Afghanistan =

- Decades: 1980s; 1990s; 2000s; 2010s; 2020s
- See also: Other events of 2004; List of years in Afghanistan

The following lists events that happened during 2004 in Afghanistan.

== Incumbents ==
- President: Hamid Karzai
- Vice President: Hedayat Amin Arsala (until 7 December)
- Vice President: Mohammed Fahim (until 7 December)
- Vice President: Nematullah Shahrani (until 7 December)
- Vice President: Karim Khalili (became Second Vice President)
- First Vice President: Ahmad Zia Massoud (starting 7 December)
- Chief Justice: Faisal Ahmad Shinwari

== January ==
Thursday, January 1 – Close to half of the loya jirga boycotted a vote on five disputed articles concerning the Proposed Afghan Constitution, promoting Chairman Subghatullah Mujadidi to call for a two-day adjournment to for negotiations. Advisors from the United Nations (UN) and the United States were present to help mediate between the two sides. The primary controversy concerned whether to have a strong president or a strong parliament.

Friday, January 2 – In Kabul, Afghan leaders met privately with U.S. and UN officials, including UN envoy Lakhdar Brahimi and U.S. ambassador Zalmay Khalilzad, to try to end the impasse over the Proposed Afghan Constitution.

- Canadian governor general Adrienne Clarkson left Kabul, ending a four-day visit with aid workers and soldiers at Camp Julien and Camp Warehouse.
- About 60 miles (97 km) northeast of Kunduz, several people were detained by U.S. and Afghan troops during a raid of a drug facility, which contained about two tons of drugs and equipment. Once the people were removed a U.S. A-10 Thunderbolt II was called in to destroy the laboratory.

Saturday, January 3 – A rocket exploded in Kabul. There were no casualties.

- Near Deh Rawood, Uruzgan Province, men attacked a U.S. military convoy that had arrested three relatives of Haji Ghulam Nabi. Two U.S. soldiers were injured.

Sunday, January 4 – The loya jirga adopted the proposed Afghan Constitution by way of consensus.

Monday, January 5 – North of Qalat, Zabul Province, men kidnapped an Afghan aid worker who was part of a caravan for Shelter For Life. Two local people were shot and injured when they tried to stop the militants. Taliban spokesman Mullah Abdul Hakim Latifi claimed responsibility.

- Gunmen threw grenades and opened fire on the United Nations High Commission for Refugees office Kandahar.
- Lakhdar Brahimi, the United Nations envoy to Afghanistan stepped down as promised to do once the Constitution of Afghanistan was approved. Brahimi's position was filled on an interim-basis by his deputy for political affairs, Jean Arnault.
- Three soldiers of the Afghan National Army died and two were wounded in a clashed with forces under the control of the Zabul Province governor. Among the dead was the commander of the army division in Zabul, Shah Alam.
- In Teheran, India, Iran and Afghanistan signed an agreement to give Indian goods heading for central Asia and Afghanistan similar preferential treatment and tariff reductions at Chabahar.

Tuesday, January 6 – In Kandahar, at least sixteen people were killed (six of which were children) and 58 people were wounded when a time bomb hidden in an apple cart exploded 100 yards (91 m) away from an Afghan military base. The crowd had gathered to investigate another bomb that had gone off 15 minutes earlier and injured a small child. A suspect was caught trying to hide in a nearby home. The blasts occurred moments before a motorcade was about to pass.

- In Afghanistan, a minibus on its way from Uruzgan to Helmand was ambushed by gunmen, leaving twelve Hazara passengers dead.
- In a report issued to the United Nations Security Council, United Nations Secretary General Kofi Annan warned that violence in Afghanistan could disrupt the timing of elections scheduled for June and noted that south and south-east Afghanistan was mostly off-limits to the United Nations, NGOs and Afghan officials. He called for another political and donor conference to address these concerns.
- A grenade was thrown at the Core office in Kandahar.
- Speaking to the media via satellite telephone, senior Taliban commander Mullah Sabir Momin apologized for the bomb attack in Kandahar the previous day that killed fifteen, including many children. Momin said the intended target was the U.S. Provincial Reconstruction Team office in Kandahar.
- U.S. and Afghan National Army forces launched an operation in Spin Boldak with the goal of arresting Taliban leaders, particularly fugitive commander Mullah Akhter Mohammad.
- Fourteen tons of aid from Canadian donors was distributed by Canadian soldiers to widows and orphans in Kabul. The donations included winter clothing, blankets, toys, chewing gum, school supplies and diapers. Care Canada also distributed to each family, through funding from the Canadian International Development Agency, enough to help feed seven people for up to a month.
- In Afghanistan, a bomb found hidden under straw near a downtown Kandahar bus station was defused.
- Gunfire was exchanged on the streets of Kandahar, prompting U.S. soldiers to move in.

Thursday, January 8 – In Kandahar, two Afghan National Army soldiers were wounded (one losing a leg) by a bomb that exploded on the roof of a building less than an eighth of a mile from the January 6 incident that killed over a dozen people.

- In Afghanistan, Kandahar police arrested six people in possession of documents that linked them to the Taliban. A confession also linked the men to the bomb planted the day before in the bus station.
- In Jalalabad, Afghan and U.S. officials held a ceremony opening a new U.S. Provincial Reconstruction Team.
- United Nations spokesman Manuel de Almeida de Silva stated that, to date, only 274,000 (2.7%) of the 10 million Afghans eligible to vote have been registered.
- Pakistan launched a military operation utilizing helicopter gunships and ground troops against suspected al-Qaeda cells in the area of South Waziristan, which borders Afghanistan.
- Afghan authorities in Kabul arrested eleven people suspected of involvement with a December 28, 2003 suicide bombing near the airport.
- Protesting against the decision by the United Nations High Commissioner for Refugees to reject their refugee claims, seven Afghan asylum-seekers (including three women) on Indonesia's Lombok island began a hunger strike by sewing up their mouths.
- In Mazari Sharif, local police removed a bomb from a ditch near a United Nations office.

Friday, January 9 – A rocket hit an army camp in Wana (Pakistan), South Waziristan, Pakistan, killing four Pakistani soldiers.

Saturday, January 10 – Interim Afghan president Hamid Karzai announced that he would be a candidate for the election to be held in June.

- A U.S. soldier died from complications caused by a vehicle accident southwest of Kabul a day earlier.

Sunday, January 11 – Five Afghan National Army soldiers died and three others were injured when they came under attack in Kandahar Province.

- In Helmand Province, four men were killed as they planted a land mine on a road regularly used by military patrols.
- A rocket was fired at the Khost airport in Afghanistan, which was used by U.S. troops, but it failed to explode.
- In Mazari Sharif, a guard and an employee were injured when a bomb exploded in front of the office of the Agency for Technical Cooperation and Development.
- Pakistan freed about 150 Afghan prisoners being held for violating immigration laws.

Monday, January 12 – The Afghan National Field Hockey Team arrived in Peshawar, Pakistan to play six matches over ten days.

- In Nimroz Province, dozens of men armed with assault rifles attacked a police checkpoint, killing four policemen.
- An agreement was signed by ISAF and the Afghan the Ministry of Defense to begin the demobilization of heavy weapons from Kabul.
- Pakistan prime minister Zafarullah Jamali met with interim Afghan President Hamid Karzai in Kabul to discuss economic links and terrorism.
- Three videos featuring women were shown on Kabul TV. One of the clips included old footage of singer Salma Jahani singing a ballad; another was a religious song in Urdu to honor the visit of Pakistani Prime Minister Zafarullah Khan Jamali.

Tuesday, January 13 – Afghanistan released 100 Pakistani prisoners to reciprocate a similar gesture by Pakistan only days earlier. The prisoners had been suspected of fighting for the Taliban.

- Tribal elders in South Waziristan, Pakistan handed over to authorities three men wanted for sheltering Al-Qaeda and Taliban fugitives.

Wednesday, January 14 – About a dozen rockets were fired at the U.S. base near the Khost airport in Afghanistan. There were no casualties.

- A ban on women singing or dancing on television in Afghanistan was re-established only days after the ban had been lifted. The Supreme Court of Afghanistan wrote to the Information and Culture Minister, Sayyid Makhdum Rahin, to protest January 12 airing. The court stated that women singing or dancing was in defiance of Islamic law.
- In Khost, U.S. forces uncovered a cache of weapons that included grenades, mortar rounds, mines and rifles.
- U.S. troops near Ghazni discovered two tanks, two anti-aircraft guns.

Thursday, January 15 – Outgoing U.N. envoy to Afghanistan, Lakhdar Brahimi, told the United Nations Security Council that elections scheduled for June were unrealistic because factions and extremists continued to threaten the peace process. Brahimi also criticized the Bonn Agreements on the grounds that the Taliban had not been present there. He also criticized western feminists protesting the burqa. He said women would go further in Afghanistan through education, not changes in dress.

Friday, January 16 – At the request of the United Nations, Chinese police officer Zhang Ming was sent to Afghanistan to help fight drug trafficking.

- In Canada, ten Afghan National Army military officers started 16-weeks of English language training. The program was to develop the officers into English instructors. Sixty-five more officers were slated for training in the program over the next three years.
- An estimated seven rockets were fired at the U.S. air base in Khost, but none hit their target.

Saturday, January 17 – Forty rebels ambushed an Afghan convoy in Kandahar Province, provoking a gun fight that left three rebels and two Afghan National Army soldiers dead.

- In spite of objections by the Afghan Supreme Court, Kabul TV aired footage of 1960s female star Ustad Mahwash singing.
- German ISAF soldiers removed from Kabul International Airport wreckage of an Antonov cargo plane left over from the Soviet invasion of Afghanistan.
- Interim Afghan president Hamid Karzai argued that the issue of women singing on television should be left to his government.

Monday, January 19 – In a raid on a compound in Kabul, Canadian soldiers arrested 16 men and seized drugs, cash and weapons.

- In Afghanistan, Uruzgan Province governor Jan Mohammad Khan and Charcheno district chief Abdur Rahman claimed that four children and seven adults were killed January 18 by a U.S. air strike on the village of Saghatho. The U.S. military refuted the claims (even as late as February 3) and said that the attack killed five armed men who near a Taliban compound.
- Three U.S. soldiers were wounded in an attack on the U.S. base in Deh Rawood in Uruzgan Province. One attacker was killed in the gunfight.
- U.S. playwright William Mastrosimone presented a play (The Afghan Women) to a group of actors at the headquarters of the Afghan television company in Kabul.
- Ismail Khan, the governor of Herat Province stated at a session of the Afghan Islamic Unification Council his harsh protest against the Afghan women's songs broadcast by Afghan TV. He and other lecturers stated they wanted the government to stop the broadcasting of such songs by the TV. Khan ordered the collection of music tapes and video tapes in Herat.

Tuesday, January 20- Pakistan announced there no longer any bans on goods exported to Afghanistan, with the exception of ghee and cooking oil.

- ISAF and Afghan police arrested several top suspects in the Gulbuddin Hekmatyar-network.

Thursday, January 22 – 100 Canadian soldiers arrived in Kabul to start a six-month tour of duty.

Friday, January 23 – Iran announced that it would place a dozen jailed al-Qaeda suspects on trial.

- Afghan National Army General Bismillah Khan arrived in New Delhi, India for a three-day official visit with planned meetings with chief of the Indian army staff general NC Vij, air chief S Krishnaswamy and Admiral Madhvendera Singh, Chairman Chiefs of Staff committee.

Saturday, January 24 – In Nangarhar Province, at least four children were wounded by a landmine.

- In Nangarhar Province, rockets hit a governmental building, causing some damages but no injuries.
- The Faroe Islands, Hope for Humanity, HELP International, and the Adventist Development and Relief Agency completed an education project in Jowzjan Province that rehabilitated the Oramast Elementary School, the Mirwaismina School and the Jowzjan Orphanage. The six-month effort provided the schools with wooden desks and chairs, glass for windows, sports equipment kit, playground equipment and a water wells. Hygiene and sanitation curriculum was also introduced.

Sunday, January 25 – Responding to rocket attacks on its air base in the region, U.S. planes bombed several areas in the Narang district, Kunar Province.

- Near the Afghan border town of Chaman, Pakistani forces arrested Maulvi Abdul Mannan Khawajazai, who ran the Taliban finances and was once the governor of the western Badghis Province.

Monday, January 26 – With assistance from UNICEF and the World Health Organization, the Afghan Ministry of Health began a three-day vaccination program intended to reach about five million children aged five and under in Afghanistan.

- In a ceremony in Kabul, interim president Hamid Karzai officially signed the Constitution of Afghanistan.

Tuesday, January 27 – A Canadian soldier, Jamie Brendan Murphy, and one Afghan civilian were killed by a suicide bomber in Kabul. Three others soldiers and nine bystanders were injured.

- Afghan higher education minister Mohammed Sharif Fayez announced that more than 6,000 people who passed a matriculation exam January 26 had to retake their exams after it was discovered that questions had been sold around the country.

Wednesday, January 28 – A British soldier was killed and another four were wounded by a car bomb in Kabul. Mullah Hakim Latifi of the Taliban claimed responsibility.

- Near the German base outside Kabul, five foreigners were injured by a suicide bomber. Mullah Hakim Latifi of the Taliban claimed responsibility.
- In Kabul, a group of Loya jirga delegates led by Abdul Hafiz Mansoor made claims that the version of the Constitution of Afghanistan signed by Hamid Karzai on January 26 contained more than fifteen changes from the document approved of on January 4. The group sent a copy of their complaints to the U.S. embassy, the United Nations Assistance Mission in Afghanistan, the European Union and former king Mohammad Zahir Shah.

Thursday, January 29 – Eight U.S. soldiers were killed and at least three were wounded when an explosion occurred at a weapons storage area near Ghazni. The explosion may have been caused by a booby-trap.

- Pakistani authorities seized 1600 kg of heroin at the border town of Kili Ali Akbar, but made no arrests.
- Asadullah Abdul Rahman, Muhammad Ismail Agha and Naqibullah (ages 13 to 15) were released by U.S. officials from Camp X-Ray in Guantánamo Bay, Cuba and returned to Afghanistan.
- A bipartisan delegation from the United States House of Representatives visited with interim Afghan president Hamid Karzai in Kabul. Delegates included Curt Weldon, Rodney Alexander, and Mark Souder.

Saturday, January 31 – In Deh Rawood, a remote-controlled bomb destroyed a vehicle, killing Mayor Khalif Sadaht and seven of his relatives.

== February ==
Sunday, February 1 – Afghan families began celebrating Eid al-Adha. In Kabul, former king Mohammad Zaher Shah and interim president Hamid Karzai joined for prayers at the downtown palace.

- A report by the International Organization for Migration revealed that human trafficking in Afghanistan had increased by an alarming amount.

Monday, February 2 – U.S. president George W. Bush submitted a 2005 budget proposal to the U.S. Congress which contained US$1.2 billion in assistance for Afghanistan focusing on education, health, infrastructure and assistance to the Afghan National Army. The budget did not contain funding estimates for U.S. military operations.

- The United Nations Food and Agriculture Organization requesting US$25.5 million to finance agricultural development projects over the next five years in Afghanistan's four main poppy producing provinces – Badakhshan Province, Helmand Province, Kandahar Province and Nangarhar Province.

Tuesday, February 3 – Interim Afghan president Hamid Karzai appointed Mohammad Yusuf as governor of Farah Province, and Azizullah Afzali as governor of Baghdis province. Karzai also named new police chiefs in five northern and central provinces. Gul Nabi Ahmadzai was appointed chief of training for the Afghan National Army.

- Two rockets were fired on Kabul. The first rocket struck a cemetery surrounded by houses and the second landed on a steep hillside nearby.
- Former Afghan king Mohammad Zaher Shah was flown from Kabul to New Delhi, India, for medical treatment. He was diagnosed with a minor blockage of his intestines and in stable condition.
- At a border crossing, renegade warlord Bacha Khan Zadran and his brother Amanullah Khan Zadran were handed over from Pakistani to Afghan officials.

Wednesday, February 4 – Interim Afghan president Hamid Karzai fired Mohammad Aref Sarwari, the head of national security.

- At an economic conference in New Delhi, India, Afghan deputy Agriculture Minister Mohammad Sharif met with Israeli deputy minister of Industry and Trade Mikhael Ratzon, requested assistance in technological innovations for agriculture and invite a team of Israeli experts to visit Afghanistan.

Thursday, February 5 – Police arrested the owner of a taxi used in a suicide bombing that killed a British soldier in Kabul on January 28.

- Interim Afghan president Hamid Karzai said that tribal leaders would decide the fate of Bacha Khan Zadran.
- Near Orgo in Badakhshan Province, an estimated 20 people were killed when fighting broke out between forces loyal to Orgo mayor Musadeq and a local militia commander Qari Ziauddin. Hundreds of civilians left their homes. Provincial officials sent hundreds of soldiers to the area to try to quell the conflict. A delegation was sent also from Kabul.

Friday, February 6 – The Indian company Mahindra Defence Systems announced that it would provide 80 SUVs and 40 jeeps to the Afghan National Army over the next six months.

Saturday, February 7 – The Afghan Disarmament, Demobilisation and Re-Integration Program, headed by Milos Krsmanovic, launched a disarmament program in northern Afghanistan aimed at disarming some 2,000 militiamen under the command of generals Abdul Rashid Dostam and Atta Muhammad.

Sunday, February 8 – Over 200 Afghan delegates gathered in Kabul for the International Conference on Counter-Narcotics in Afghanistan to discuss law enforcement and alternative livelihoods for poppy farmers and demand reduction. Keynote speakers included executive director of the United Nations Office on Drugs and Crime Antonio Maria Costa, interim president Hamid Karzai and the United Kingdom's foreign office minister Bill Rammell.

Monday, February 9 – Under tight security, NATO Secretary General Jaap de Hoop Scheffer visited Kabul and met with Afghan interim president Hamid Karzai.

Tuesday, February 10 – In Afghanistan, the Kabul Primary Court sentenced to death two former Taliban officials, Zia Ahmad and Abdul Nab, for the murder of aid-worker Bettina Goislard November 16, 2003. The trial took three hours and the judgment took twenty minutes. No witnesses to the crime were present at the trial. The men planned to appeal the decision.

- A remote-controlled bomb exploded on a road near Asadabad, as the vehicle of Kunar Province governor Sayed Fazel Akbar was passing. The vehicle sustained minor damage, but no one was injured.

Wednesday, February 11 – In Khost, Major Mohammed Isa Khan, the deputy intelligence director of Khost Province, was assassinated in his car by gunman Hafez Elal. Elal tried to escape but was chased down by bodyguards. To avoid capture, he detonated explosives strapped to his body. Taliban spokesman Mohammed Saiful Adel claimed responsibility.

- East of Kabul, United Kingdom British troops found a bomb made with a modified anti-tank mine.

Thursday, February 12 – Addressing the National Defence College in Islamabad, Pakistan, president Pervez Musharraf admitted that some anti-government activity in Afghanistan was coming from within the Pakistan border.

- A rocket landed on a residential hillside in the Khair Khana district of Kabul, injuring two children.
- A rocket landed in the Badam Bagh district of Kabul, causing no damage or casualties.
- After losing contact with its controllers, a German unmanned spy plane used by the ISAF parachuted to the ground, landing on the roof of a home in Kabul.

Friday, February 13 – One civilian and old soldier were killed and six people were wounded in an explosion at an Afghan National Army military post near Khost.

- Twenty-one rockets landed near the airport in Khost.
- The unit of the 2nd infantry brigade of the Macedonian Army arrived in Afghanistan to begin a six-month tour with ISAF.
- An anti-tank mine exploded under a Humvee northwest of Ghazni, killing one U.S. soldier of the 10th Mountain Division and wounding nine others.
- In Kandahar, the first women's-only site opened for voter registration.

Saturday, February 14 – Near Bala Buluk in Farah Province, four Afghans working for the United Nations de-mining agency were fatally shot in an ambush.

- U.S. special operations forces used helicopters to raid a village in Helmand Province and detained about 40 people. Two were identified as Mulvi Abdul Ghafar and Gul Agha, midlevel Taliban leaders.

Sunday, February 15 – A Canadian soldier was shot in the face when his rifle went off in his sleeping quarters at Camp Julien in Kabul. He survived and was placed in critical condition.

- In Gulbahar, former members of the Northern Alliance turned over eight multiple rocket launchers, four tanks and three Scud missiles to the Afghan National Army.
- With the support of an NGO, a driving school for women opened in Herat.
- Dr. Zinat Karzai, the wife of Afghan interim president Hamid Karzai, registered to vote. She received her voting card from Amina-i-Fidrawi high school in Kabul.

Monday, February 16 – After being open for one day, a driving school in Herat was shut down by local authorities.

Tuesday, February 17 – In Kandahar Province, men loyal to two senior government officials exchanged gunfire in a bazaar wounding four people.

- Afghan official Abdul Karim Umrani died in his bedroom from carbon monoxide poisoning at the consulate in Khorugh, Tajikistan. Another official of the consulate, Saidrahim Mahmadrahim, was in serious condition.

Wednesday, February 18 – Taliban leader Mullah Dadullah warned Afghans not to vote in the election scheduled for June.

- European Union External Relations Commissioner Chris Patten visited Kabul.

Thursday, February 19 – former Afghan king Mohammed Zahir Shah was released from a hospital in New Delhi, India after two weeks of receiving medical treatment for an intestinal problem. He remained in New Delhi, however, for further observation.

- The United States opened a provincial reconstruction team involving some 100 soldiers in Asadabad.
- In Afghanistan, high ranking delegate Mahbooba Hoqooqmal, deputy of the Afghan Ministry of Women Affairs Dr. Suraya Soobhrang, and delegates of the Afghan Ministry of Justice and the Afghanistan Independent Human Rights Commission visited Herat Province to investigate a series of women's accidents. It was reported that more than 180 women had burned themselves during the year and only one-third of them survived.
- A high commission to prevent children smuggling was set up by the Afghan Ministry of Labour and Social Affairs.

Sunday, February 22 – Before takeoff, a Louis Berger Group helicopter was attacked by gunfire in Thaloqan village in Kandahar Province, killing the Australian pilot and seriously injuring a U.S. woman. Taliban spokesmen took responsibility.

- Pakistani Interior Minister Faisal Saleh Hayat confirmed that Pakistani paramilitary troops had been deployed along the borders of Paktia and Paktika Provinces, Afghanistan, with the intent of catching leading commanders of the Afghan resistance, including Osama bin Laden.
- The Afghan Independent Human Rights Commission announced it was investigating 85 kidnapping cases involving children.

Monday, February 23 – In Thaloqan village in Kandahar Province, U.S. forces from the 10th Mountain Division assisted hundreds of local police in a search for the gunman who killed an Australian pilot the previous day. Thirty suspected Taliban members were rounded up.

Wednesday, February 25 – Five Afghan employees of Serai Development Foundation were killed and two injured in an ambush northeast of Kabul.

Thursday, February 26 – United States Secretary of Defense Donald Rumsfeld spoke in front of a graduating class of 48 Afghan policemen in Kandahar.

Friday, February 27 – Two hundred five South Korean medics and military engineers left Seoul for Afghanistan to replace existing troops, and to help with reconstruction projects for six months.

- Afghanistan agreed to accept offers of assistance from NATO, the World Bank, and the International Civil Aviation Organization to repair and update the Kabul International Airport at an estimated to cost of US$50 million. The project will include mine removal, electrical and communications upgrades, terminal renovations and air traffic control facility improvements.

Saturday, February 28 – The United States and Pakistan denied an Iranian radio report that Osama bin Laden had been captured "a long time ago" in Pakistan's border region with Afghanistan.

- At a roadblock in Zeri Noor, just outside Wana, Pakistan, Pakistani troops killed 11 Afghan men in a minibus that did not stop at the checkpoint. Sixteen Afghans were arrested. Pakistan officials claimed that someone from the minibus fired shots first.

== March ==
Monday, March 1 – During public ceremonies in Kabul, of Shia Muslims commemorating the slaying of their leader Imam al-Husayn, an Afghan National Army cadet shouted abusive language and spat at a banner, prompting the Shia Muslims to throw stones at the soldiers. The cadets then fired into the crowd, killing one and injuring sixteen.

Tuesday, March 2 – A voluntary repatriation program for Afghan refugees run by the United Nations High Commissioner for Refugees resumed after a four-month hiatus following the murder of a staff member in November.

- In Zabul Province, Afghan forces arrested four Taliban suspects, including commander Mullah Nahim.
- 750 policemen from five Afghan provinces began a three-week training course at the Gardez Police Academy to assist in administering a fair election.
- In the tribal South Waziristan region of Pakistan bordering Afghanistan, over a dozen rockets were launched on Pakistani bunkers and checkpoints. The Pakistani troops were engaged in a hunt for Al-Qaeda members.

Wednesday, March 3 – At a ceremony held in the Chinese embassy in Kabul, Chinese ambassador to Afghanistan Sun Yuxi and Afghan Irrigation, Water Resources and Environment Minister Mohammad Yusuf Nooristani signed a contract detailing China's assistance in a major irrigation re-build project near the capital. The project was supposed to be finished in early 2006.

- In a remote border region near Afghanistan, Pakistani authorities detained at least 15 Ahmadzai Wazir tribal leaders for failing to turn over suspected al-Qaeda fugitives. The leaders had agreed to help trace foreigners suspected of terrorism but did not live up to the deal.

Thursday, March 4 – Rebels attacked a border post in Maruf district in Kandahar Province, killing seven members of the Afghan National Army.

- Near Khost, fourteen suspected militants were captured during a U.S. air assault on a compound.

Friday, March 5 – U.S.-led forces killed nine rebels in a gun battle in near Orgun, near the border with Pakistan.

- In the Shah Joy district in Zabul Province, a Turkish engineer and a local security guard were murdered; a second Turkish worker and another local security guard were kidnapped. The Turkish men were working on a project to resurface the Kabul-Kandahar highway.

Saturday, March 6 – Near Qalat, Zabul Province, Mohammad Isah, a director of the Afghan Red Crescent Society, was murdered by men who stopped his car.

- West of Ghazni, three U.S. soldiers with the 10th Mountain Division were wounded when their vehicle struck a landmine. Three local men were detained.
- In Uruzgan Province, three Afghan civilians were killed by U.S. soldiers. The soldiers' vehicle had struck an explosive device.
- In Afghanistan, two operations involving U.S. and Afghan forces resulted in the deaths of nine rebels and the capture of fourteen.

Sunday, March 7 – Afghan government officials announced that Afghan Planning Minister Haji Muhammad Mohaqiq resigned from the cabinet. Mohaqiq said he was fired after announcing his intention to run against interim president Hamid Karzai in the June 2004 elections. Mohaqiq was replaced by Ramazan Bashardoost.

- The United States began Operation Mountain Storm across southern and eastern Afghanistan; the aim was to further destroy the al-Qaeda and Taliban infrastructure.

Monday, March 8 – Human Rights Watch published Enduring Freedom - Abuses by US Forces in Afghanistan, which criticizes the United States' actions in Afghanistan. The report cites excessive force, arbitrary detentions and the mistreating people in custody as prominent abuses.

- Under the auspices of the United Nations High Commissioner for Refugees, volunteer Afghan refugees began repatriation from different parts of Balochistan in Pakistan.
- An Afghan National Army soldier was killed and another injured when rebels opened fire from a vehicle at a checkpoint near Maywand.

Tuesday, March 9 – In Ankara, Turkey, Afghan Deputy Prime Minister and Defense Minister Mohammad Fahim Khan met with Turkish National Defense Minister Vecdi Gönül.

- Using rockets and rifles, at least a dozen rebels attacked the U.S. outpost in Nangalam, Kunar Province. U.S. forces summoned an A-10 Thunderbolt II for assistance. An Afghan civilian was wounded in the crossfire.
- In Afghanistan, Kabul-area warlords and commanders turned over more than a dozen tanks to the Afghan Defense Ministry, placing them under the control of ISAF and the Afghan National Army.

Wednesday, March 10 – Three rockets were fired at the U.S. base at the airport near Kandahar. There were no casualties.

- The United Nations reported that 28% of the 1.4 million Afghans registered to vote were women. This percentage was up dramatically from the 16% registered in December 2003.
- About 100 British special forces soldiers arrived in Kabul and then disembarked to an unknown location in Afghanistan.

Friday, March 12 – Dodsal, a Dubai-based construction company, signed a US$230 million contract to set up a modern petroleum infrastructure in Afghanistan. The deal entails the construction of 700 retail outlets.

- About 2,000 ethnic Hazara supporters of Haji Muhammad Mohaqiq staged a march in Mazari Sharif, demanding that president Hamid Karzai re-instate Mohaqiq. On March 7, Karzai removed Mohaqiq from the post of planning minister.
- In Tehran, Iran, Iranian Interior Minister Abdolvahed Mousavi-Lari and his Afghan Interior Minister Ahmad Jalali signed a security pact which focused on border protection and the fight against drug trafficking.
- In Kabul, the National Unity Party of Afghanistan, led by former General Nur-al-Haq Olomi, announced its political campaign.

Saturday, March 13 – In Kandahar Province, rebels attacked a government office. In the battle, three rebels and one Afghan National Army soldier were killed.

- In the capital of Laghman Province, two rockets landed, killing one civilian.
- In Kabul, a rocket fired flew over a U.N. compound and the U.S. military headquarters. The rocket did not detonate when it landed.
- In Kabul. a rocket flew over the center of the city and exploded on hillside.
- U.S.-led troops surprised eight insurgents in caves southwest of Qalat, Zabul Province, prompting a gunbattle in which three of the guerrillas were killed and five others were wounded.
- U.S.-led coalition troops detained five rebels in caves southwest of Qalat, Zabul Province. Anti-coalition propaganda was also found.

Sunday, March 14 – Three rockets landed in Jalalabad. There were no injuries, but windows shattered and some walls crumbled.

- Eight suspects were detained by U.S.-led coalition troops southwest of Qalat, Zabul Province.
- Rocket-propelled grenades were fired at a United Nations team trying to organize voter registration.

Monday, March 15 – The United States initiated Operation Mountain Storm, which intended to drive from inside Afghanistan into a region of rebel sanctuaries and meet the Pakistani military driving from the opposite direction.

Tuesday, March 16 – In an iris verification center in Quetta, Pakistan, 174 Afghan refugees were processed. Each refugee older than six years underwent a computerized iris scan to determine if they had previously been checked and received a repatriation package. The refugees then entered Afghanistan through the Chaman border.

- Pakistani forces began an operation against suspected Al-Qaeda rebels in the mountainous region of South Waziristan, close to the border of Afghanistan. Fifteen Pakistani troops were killed and 22 wounded; twenty-four rebels were killed.

Wednesday, March 17 – In Kabul, United States Secretary of State Colin Powell met with Afghan interim President Hamid Karzai to discuss security and preparations for the June elections.

- Jordanian Army special forces arrived in Afghanistan.

Thursday, March 18 – Pakistani forces re-engaged an operation against suspected Al-Qaeda rebels in the villages of Azam Warsak, Shin Warsak and Kaloosha in the mountainous region of South Waziristan, close to the border of Afghanistan. Each side utilized heavy weaponry. 24 rebels and 16 Afghan troops were killed there during a sweep March 15. The U.S. deployed 13,500 soldiers on the Afghan side.

- U.S. and rebel forces clashed in the Tarin Kowt District of Uruzgan Province.
- 250 more Afghan National Army troops were sent to Khost.
- Two U.S. Army soldiers of the 2nd Battalion, 22nd Infantry Regiment of the 10th Mountain Division (Sgt. Michael Esposito and Staff. Sgt. Anthony Lagman) died when their 11-man unit came under fire in the Hindu Kush mountains of Afghanistan. At least five rebel fighters died in a heavy exchange of fire. The mission was part of Operation Mountain Storm.

Friday, March 19 – A U.S. airstrike on a village in the Charcheno district of Afghanistan killed six civilians and injured seven.

- About two dozen rebel fighters with heavy weapons launched an attack in the Barmal district of Paktika Province, but they were repelled after four hours of fighting. Three rebels were killed and the rest fled into Pakistan when U.S. helicopters fired on them.
- Pakistani troops were engaged in a pitched battle with an estimated 400 rebels near the Afghan border.

Saturday, March 20 – Taliban forces threatened to kill a Turkish highway engineer kidnapped three weeks earlier, demanding that Afghan authorities release two Taliban militia members who were sentenced to death for the November 16 murder of Bettina Goislard.

- Heavy U.S. forces were deployed to the Afghan border near Waziristan, Pakistan to assist in an offensive against an estimated 400 rebels suspected of harboring Tohir Yo‘ldosh.

Sunday, March 21 – Afghan Civil Aviation Minister Mirwais Sadiq (son of governor Ismail Khan) was killed by a rocket propelled grenade during a gun battle in Herat. Two police officers also died in the attack. Herat military commander Zaher Naib Zada claimed responsibility for the assassination. Zada had earlier been fired by Sadiq's father. Factional fighting between supporters of Zahir Nayebzada and of Ismail Khan involving tanks and guns ensued in the region, leaving more than 100 people dead. Days later, president Hamid Karzai would say Sadiq's death was caused by a "small accident."

- Interim Afghan President Hamid Karzai called an emergency cabinet meeting to discuss the assassination of Mirwais Sadiq. Karzai dispatched Afghan National Army troops to Herat.
- Afghan TV reported a failed assassination attempt on Ismail Khan, but Khan's spokesman denied the report.
- An unmanned NATO spy plane crashed on the grounds of the presidential palace in Kabul.
- A U.S. B-1 Lancer and a B-52 Stratofortress flew over Herat as a reminder, according to Lt. Col. Bryan Hilferty, of the presence of U.S. forces and to "rest calm."
- U.S. troops stationed at the military base in Herat provided shelter to German and Italian diplomats after fighting erupted near the German Consulate.

Monday, March 22 – Afghan defense minister Mohammad Qasim Fahim and interior minister Ali Ahmad Jalali arrived in Herat to assess tensions.

- Six-hundred troops of the Afghan National Army arrived in Herat to contain violence between warring factions.
- Zahir Nayebzada fled Herat.
- United States special forces set up a remote post in Orgun.
- In Kabul, the Afghanistan International Bank, managed by ING-IGA, began operation.

Tuesday, March 23 – In Herat, a public burial took place for Mirwais Sadiq. The body was taken by tank to its resting place on a hill overlooking the city. Thousands were in attendance.

Friday, March 26 – The United Nations Security Council unanimously passed Resolution 1536 which extended the mandate of the United Nations Assistance Mission in Afghanistan for another full year.

Saturday, March 27 – In Afghanistan, three hand grenades were thrown at homes of Afghan National Army soldiers. No one was injured.

- Iran exported 32,000 vases of flowers to Afghanistan.

Sunday, March 28 – Afghan interim president Hamid Karzai announced that the national elections scheduled for June would be delayed until September to give the U.N. more time to prepare.

- In the Deh Rawud District of Uruzgan Province, at least ten Afghan National Army soldiers were killed in an ambush by rebel fighters.
- A suicide bomber was killed when his bomb exploded early as he tried to attack a military base in southeastern Afghanistan.
- Six people were wounded in a rebel attack in a southeastern Afghan town.
- In Khost, a rocket injured six civilians, including one child, in a restaurant near the U.S. Airbase.
- Hikmet Cetin, NATO's Senior Civilian Representative in Afghanistan, departed Kabul to attend in Berlin, Germany a two-day international conference on reconstruction assistance to Afghanistan.
- Afghan Interior Minister Ali Ahmad Jalali announced the establishment of a new province, Daykundi. The province would be entitled to its own governor, a security commander, more police and funds.

Monday, March 29 – In Kandahar, militia corps commander Khan Mohammed oversaw hundreds of his fighters giving up their assault rifles, machine guns, and rockets to the Afghan National Army.

- U.S. troops searched several villages southwest of Khost, searching for weapons and information.

Tuesday, March 30 – In a raid in southern Afghanistan, U.S. troops detained six suspected Taliban members.

- A 30-year-old Afghan man died after being struck by a Canadian G-Wagon.

Wednesday, March 31 – In Berlin, Germany, a two-day international conference on reconstruction assistance to Afghanistan began. The conference was attended by 65 countries. Alastair McKechnie, the World Bank country director for Afghanistan, hoped to accumulate during the conference donations of US$27.5 billion (to be granted over seven years). Afghan interim president Hamid Karzai and United States Secretary of State Colin Powell announced that the United States had, on top of the US$1.2 billion already promised, pledged an additional US$1 billion in aid for 2004. Japan promised US$525 million more over the next two years. German Chancellor Gerhard Schröder pledged (in addition to US$391 million promised at a conference in Tokyo in 2002) US$391 million over the next four years.

- The first wave of 2,000 new U.S. Marines arrived in Afghanistan to participate in the hunt for al-Qaeda and Taliban rebels.

== April ==
Thursday, April 1 – Up to fifty New Zealand Special Air Service troops flew to Afghanistan for "long-range reconnaissance and direct action missions".

Monday, April 5 – In Badakhshan Province, anti-narcotics police destroyed four heroin laboratories and seized 10 tons of opium poppy. There were several arrests.

- The U.S. ambassador to Afghanistan, Zalmay Khalilzad, stated that terrorist sanctuaries and bases continued to exist and develop in Pakistan. He added that U.S. troops might need to enter Pakistan to catch the rebels. Pakistan's information minister, Sheikh Ahmed Rashid, called the comments "harmful" and said Pakistan would never allow foreign troops on its soil. The White House quickly downplayed Khalilzad's comments.

Wednesday, April 7 – A three-hour gun battle occurred during a joint Afghan–U.S. operation near Gereshk in Helmand Province, killing one rebel and one Afghan soldier, while wounding one U.S. soldier and one Afghan soldier.

- Two Afghan rebels were killed in a gun battle at a military checkpoint in Sangin District of Helmand Province.
- In Uruzgan Province, an Afghan National Army soldier was killed and another was injured when their vehicle hit a mine.

Thursday, April 8 – Troops under the command of Abdul Rashid Dostum overran Maymana, the capital of Faryab Province. Some reports claim Dostum forces fired into a crowd, killing four. Gov. Enayatullah Enayat was rushed to an airport and evacuated. Afghan National Army troops were flown from Kabul to Faryab province.

- Hamidullah, an Afghan intelligence chief, and two Afghan National Army soldiers were abducted by dozens of men near Chenartu in Uruzgan Province. Taliban leader Mullah Hakim Latifi claimed that the men had been killed, and offered to exchange their bodies for that of a Taliban held by Uruzgan officials.

Saturday, April 10 – In Kod-i-Barq, Balkh Province, an armed encounter took place between forces loyal to Abdul Rashid Dostum and a local Tajik leader Atta Mohammad. The incident took place in the Mazar fertilizer factory residential area and resulted in a few injuries.

- Abdul Rashid Dostum forces withdrew from Maymana, the capital of Faryab Province, but remained in the province despite orders to leave.

Monday, April 12 – In Verona, Italy, nine members of the Afghanistan national football team disappeared during the team's tour of Europe. Italian border police were alerted. They later surfaced in Germany and the Netherlands to claim asylum.

- In the Spera District of Khost Province, 700 Afghan and 100 U.S. troops began a new operation to hunt down Al-Qaeda and Taliban members.

Tuesday, April 13 – Afghan national security officers, local police and more than 100 Canadian soldiers raided a compound in the Charar Asiab district outside Kabul, arresting six suspects of Hezb-e-Islami Gulbuddin.

- Taliban members killed two Afghan civilians for allegedly spying for the U.S. forces in Uruzgan Province.
- In Kabul, Afghan forces and ISAF peacekeepers arrested six suspected Taliban members.

Wednesday, April 14 – Taliban members ambushed and shot dead the deputy chief of Mezana District and several of his colleagues in Zabul Province.

- A bomb exploded in front of the U.S. military base further in Kandahar, wounding General Salim Khan, a senior police official, and two of his bodyguards.
- In Khost Province, rebels exchanged of rocket and machine-gun fire with Afghan National Army soldiers killing two and wounding two. Nine rebels were also killed.
- Police chief Yar Mohammed and nine of his officers were ambushed and killed by rebel forces in Zabul Province.
- In the Barmal District of Paktika Province, five Taliban rebels in military uniforms pretending to be pro-government forces executed seven Afghans, including five government officials, a woman and child. They were asked if they supported interim president Hamid Karzai and the government. The people in the vehicle said yes, and were killed on the spot.

Thursday, April 15 – United Nations High Commissioner for Refugees Ruud Lubbers began a four-day visit to Afghanistan. He was supposed to visit the Zahre Dasht camp for internally displaced persons (near Kandahar); however, his security could not be insured, and the visit was canceled.

Friday, April 16 – The government of Nangarhar Province banned women from performing or reporting news on television and radio.

- On the Del Aram Road at the last checkpoint before Farah Province, men riding in three station wagons fired rockets and machine guns when they were stopped at the checkpoint, killing eight Afghan National Army soldiers.
- Interim Afghan president Hamid Karzai and U.S. ambassador Zalmay Khalilzad attended the groundbreaking ceremony for the Hyatt Regency hotel to be constructed by Afghan-American and Turkish investors.
- U.S. Chairman of the Joint Chiefs of Staff Richard Myers met with U.S. commanders in Kabul.

Saturday, April 17 – United Nations High Commissioner for Refugees Ruud Lubbers visited with interim Afghan president Hamid Karzai and other senior Afghan officials in Kabul. Lubbers also visited Istalif and the Bagaram district.

Sunday, April 18 – The Economic Cooperation Organization opened a two-day conference in Kabul bringing together representatives from ten regional countries. The agenda included ways to improve development and promote trade, and investment opportunities.

Monday, April 19 – In a raid on a compound in central Kabul, local police and ISAF forces arrested eight militants with suspected links to Hezb-i-Islami and al-Qaeda.

Tuesday, April 20 – At the opening in Kabul of a three-day gathering of representatives of international donor countries, interim president Hamid Karzai announced a reduction in the size of his 30-person cabinet and a clarification of the responsibilities of each ministry. However, the plan needed the approved of the current cabinet before taking effect.

- German foreign minister Joschka Fischer visited Kunduz and met the provincial governor and some of the 300 German peacekeeping troops posted there. Later he met interim president Hamid Karzai in Kabul.
- In Kabul, Abdullah Shah was killed by firing squad, marking the first sanctioned execution in the country since the fall of the Taliban in late 2001. Abdullah Shah was convicted of more than 20 murders. News of the execution was kept secret until the story was revealed by Amnesty International a week later.

Wednesday, April 21 – In Kabul, local police and ISAF soldiers arrested four suspects, three near Kabul Stadium and one in front of the Finance Ministry. Three detonators were found in the vest of the last suspect. Over a dozen other suspects were taken into custody in a raid on a home.

- A bomb near Spin Boldak killed one person and injured two others. The blast occurred near a building where the governor was meeting with local officials.
- U.S. forces battled for four hours against rebels in the Tangi Mountains of Zabul Province, killing two fighters and arresting two others. Five AK-47 rifles and one rocket launcher were seized by the U.S. forces.
- A bomb exploded near a bazaar in Kandahar, damaging a nearby shop and killing the bomber.
- Afghan Sami Yousafzai, employed by Newsweek, was detained by Pakistani forces when he tried to enterNorth Waziristan; he was held until June 2. Eliza Griswold, a U.S. journalist employed by The New Yorker, was also detained, but was quickly freed and deported.

Thursday, April 22 – In the Ghazi Abad District of Kunar Province, a bomb exploded on a truck carrying fuel for a U.S. military base, wounding three Afghan men.

- After receiving pressure from Afghan interim president Hamid Karzai, the government of Nangahar Province lifted ban on women performers on television and radio.
- U.S. soldier Pat Tillman and a member of the Afghan National Army were killed by hostile fire in an ambush in eastern Afghanistan. Two other U.S. soldiers were wounded.
- In Afghanistan, an explosive device detonated on the road to Kandahar airport as a U.N. convoy passed. There were no injuries.

Friday, April 23 – In a Panjwai District village of Kandahar Province, a group of 50 armed men attacked aid workers of the Central Asia Development Group, setting fire to eight vehicles. No casualties were reported.

Saturday, April 24 – Near the village of Dailanor, in Kandahar Province, rebels ambushed a U.S. military convoy on a road, detonating an explosion that wounded three U.S. Marines, one seriously. The Marines were part of a contingent of 2,000 Marines who arrived in Afghanistan in recent weeks.

Sunday, April 25 – Interim Afghan president Hamid Karzai visited Kandahar for the first time since there was an attempt on his life there on September 5, 2002. A man with a grenade near the travel route was apprehended by local police.

- Local police found and destroyed 48 new Chinese-made rockets southwest of Kabul.

Monday, April 26 – Top diplomats of NATO's North Atlantic Council visited Kabul for the first time since it took over command of ISAF.

- In the Panjwai District of Kandahar Province, two aid workers and an Afghan National Army soldier were killed rebels.

Wednesday, April 28 – North of Kabul, local police arrested 16 men suspected of plotting to smuggle weapons into the capital.

- In Kabul's Deputy Minister for Refugees and Repatriation, Mohammad Naim Ghiacy hosted a meeting with an Iranian delegation led by Ahmed Hosseini and with UNHCR representatives Filippo Grandi and Philippe Lavanchy to discuss Afghan repatriation progress. To date, 2 million Afghans lived in Iran, of whom 800,000 are considered refugees.

Thursday, April 29 – Afghan Interior Minister Ali Ahmed Jalali announced that Kabul police rescued that week more than 17 children from child kidnappers.

Friday, April 30 – At least five Afghan National Army soldiers were killed in an attack by rebels in Panjwai District, Kandahar Province.

- At least two people were killed in an attack by rebels who attacked a government office in Uruzgan Province.
- The Afghan government arrested 19-year-old Mohammad Sahil, a Pakistani national, for spying. Sahil was affiliated with the Islamic party of Jamiat-ul-Ansar and fought under the Taliban command in Panjwae District of Kandahar Province.

== May ==
Sunday, May 2 – About 60 U.S. troops in Afghanistan strayed into Pakistan and searched the village of Alwara Mandi in a night time operation. The incursion was accidental and lasted only 25 minutes.

Monday, May 3 – Ten Afghan National Army soldiers were found dead in southern Afghanistan after being abducted in two rebel raids. Five soldiers were found dead on a mountainside in Niamashien district of Kandahar Province; five soldiers were found dead in the Sur Ghogan area.

Wednesday, May 5 – The U.S. sent 2,000 Marines from the 22nd MEU (SOC) to the area around Tirin Kot, 250 miles southwest of Kabul.

- Sixty prisoners as a first wave of suspected Taliban prisoners were moved from Sheberghan prison to the Pul-e-Charkhi jail outside Kabul. Many of them were suffering from tuberculosis. About 900 prisoners staged a riot in the prison a week earlier, protesting their conditions. They were being held without scheduled trials.
- Sixty members of the Hawaii Army National Guard's 193rd Aviation left for Afghanistan to replace U.S. soldiers from their unit who were in Kandahar since August 2003.
- Two British contractors working for Global Risk Strategies and their Afghan driver were killed by members of the Taliban in an attack in the Mandol district of Nuristan region, 200 km east of the capital Kabul. The contractors were assisting the United Nations prepare for the upcoming elections.
- U.S. troops searched houses in Pakistani territory, against the wishes of Pakistan.

Friday, May 7 – Six Afghan National Army soldiers were wounded and two were killed in an attack by Taliban forces on a district building in Shah Wali Kot, just north of Kandahar.

- In Moscow, Russia, Afghan foreign minister Abdullah Abdullah met with Russian foreign minister Sergei Lavrov and Russian National Security Council Secretary Igor Ivanov to discuss key issues, including the settlement of Afghanistan's Soviet-era debt and the provision of regional security.
- In Zabul Province, U.S. forces captured at least 25 militants, including a Taliban commander, Mullah Rozi Khan.

Saturday, May 8 – Four Afghan election staff workers survived the explosion of their Jeep near Grabawa, Nangarhar Province. Their driver was slightly injured.

Sunday, May 9 – Two foreigners (about 30 years old and wearing Afghan clothes) were found dead in a park in west Kabul. One had been beaten with bricks or stones; the other had been strangled. One of the foreigners was carrying a Swiss passport.

Monday, May 10 – Interim Afghan president Hamid Karzai visited Herat to negotiated with Ismail Khan regarding disarmament. Karzai traveled via a U.S. C-130 military transport plane and was guarded by U.S. bodyguards.

- Two Afghan National Army soldiers were killed by rebels on a highway near Shahjoy in Zabul Province.
- An Afghan National Army vehicle was ambushed near Qalat, Zabul Province. Its driver was shot and wounded.

Tuesday, May 11 – In Kabul, an ISAF peacekeeper was slightly injured by a rocket fired into the ISAF main base.

Wednesday, May 12 – In Kabul, a 17-year-old Afghan man was killed and another injured when their motorcycle with three people aboard struck a trailer towed by a Canadian army truck. The motorcycle attempted to pass a convoy of Canadian military vehicles headed for the airport.

- U.S. troops killed five suspected Taliban rebels and arrested five more during a clash the Paj Kotal mountain pass region of Kandahar Province.

Saturday, May 15 – Near Girishk in Helmand Province, rebels attacked a U.S.-led coalition combat patrol, killing one U.S. soldier (Chief Warrant Officer Bruce E. Price) and wounding two others. Two men were detained; they were allegedly brothers of Mullah Abdul Ghafoor.

- In Helmand Province, U.S. forces defused a bomb at a bridge.
- In the Panjwayi district of Kandahar Province, local police seized 80 AK-47s smuggled in an oil transport truck. Two of the arrested men were alleged to be brothers of Mullah Shirien.

Monday, May 17 – In Islamabad, Pakistan, finance ministers of Pakistan and Afghanistan and the deputy secretary of the United States Department of Treasury John B. Taylor met to review economic developments in the region.

- In Farah, night letters were scattered warning people not to register to vote "or they will be punished."

Tuesday, May 18 – In Doha, Qatar, an international two-day forum opened to discuss financial, technical and personnel-related aid to Afghan police. Representatives of governmental organizations from over 20 countries were in attendance.

- In Seoul, South Korea, the Korea Resources Corporation signed a memorandum of understanding with Afghanistan on cooperation in developing mineral resources.
- Former King of Afghanistan Mohammad Zahir Shah was brought to a hospital in the United Arab Emirates because of nose bleeding caused by heat. He was reported in stable condition.

Wednesday, May 19 – Between Shindand and Farah, rebels ambushed a police car, and killed two officers returning home from escorting U.N. staff members.

Thursday, May 20 – A remote-controlled bomb destroyed a vehicle carrying election workers through the Jaji Maydan District of Khost Province, Afghanistan, injuring at least four people.

- A homemade bomb was uncovered in a girls' school being used as a voter registration center in Puli Alam.
- U.S. troops deployed in Afghanistan crossed into Pakistan's tribal.

Friday, May 21 – In Tani village, Khost Province, Afghanistan, three civilians were killed and two wounded in a pre-dawn attack by U.S. helicopter gunships. U.S. forces claimed they had been fired on; villagers at the scene said no U.S. patrol had been fired on.

Saturday, May 22 – The U.S. military named Brig. Gen. Charles Jacoby, deputy operational commander at the Bagram Air Base, to carry out a review of U.S. secretive Afghan. Jacoby was to carry out a top-to-bottom review and deliver a report by mid-June.

- Local Pakistani newspapers reported an incursion by U.S. troops from Afghanistan into Pakistan.
- About 20 rebels on motorcycles killed an Afghan National Army soldier in an attack on troops guarding a shipment of tractors and generators as it moved toward Waza Khwa in Paktika Province.
- Afghanistan's first commercial television channel went on air in Kabul, funded by Ahmed Shah Afghanzai.

Sunday, May 23 – In Kabul, a rocket-propelled grenade killed a Norwegian ISAF peacekeeper and injured another as a four-vehicle convoy was driving back from patrol.

- Two people were killed in a rocket attack near Tirin Kot in Uruzgan Province. Police chief Rozi Khan said the victims were civilians; police chief Abdul Rahim Khan said the victims were of the Afghan National Army.

Tuesday, May 25 – Pakistani and U.S. military officials met to discuss mechanism to stop recent military incursions from Afghanistan by U.S. forces hunting suspected al-Qaeda and Taliban fugitives in the border region.

- U.S. planes helped Afghan National Army forces attack suspected Taliban forces in the mountains of the Arghistan District in Kandahar Province, killing some 20 suspected insurgents at a recently discovered camp. Three of his Afghan soldiers were injured.
- In Paris, France, Frenchmen David Courtailler and Ahmed Laidouni and Algerian Mohamed Baadache were convicted of organizing networks that sent militants to Afghan camps for training in terrorism.

Wednesday, May 26 – Interim Afghan president Hamid Karzai enacted an election law that requires both presidential and parliamentary elections to be held through free, general, secret and direct voting. To win the race, a presidential candidate needs at least 50 percent of the vote. A presidential candidate is required to gather 10,000 voters backing the bid.

- Three children were killed by a recently planted roadside bomb in Kandahar.

Friday, May 28 – A remote-controlled explosive wounded five Afghan soldiers on a road in the Sozyan area of Uruzgan Province. Three suspects were later detained.

Saturday, May 29 – Four U.S.Special Operations Soldiers were killed when their Humvee hit a landmine in the Sorie district of Zabul Province. Three U.S. soldiers were wounded in the blast.

- In Helmand Province, four Afghan National Army soldiers and one rebel died in a clash.
- In Afghanistan, rebels in vehicles swept into Musa Qala and opened fire on the government office with assault rifles and heavy machine-guns. Four of the 30 soldiers defending the compound were killed and eight others wounded. One rebel was also killed and four were captured.

== June ==
Tuesday, June 1 – Haji Ajab Shah, the chief of police Jalalabad, was killed and three of his staff injured after a bomb exploded underneath his chair.

Wednesday, June 2 – Afghans Fasil Ahmad and Besmillah, Belgian Helene de Beir, Norwegian Egil Tynaes, and Dutchman Willem Kwint, all workers for Doctors Without Borders killed in an ambush near Khair Khana in Badghis Province. They were the first ever fatalities for the group. Mullah Abdul Hakim Latifi, a spokesman for the Taliban, took responsibility for the attack.

- Sami Yousafzai, an Afghan journalist employed by Newsweek was freed from Pakistan after being detained since April 21.
- U.S. and Afghan troops backed by U.S. warplanes fought rebels in the mountains in the Miana Shien district of Kandahar Province, killing 13 rebels and arresting eight. Two U.S. troops and one Afghan National Army soldier were wounded.
- The United States Congress unanimously approved a $25 billion emergency request from George W. Bush to fund military operations in Iraq and Afghanistan.

Thursday, June 3 – Doctors Without Borders suspended its work in Afghanistan.

- UNHCR suspended all travel in Badghis Province.

Friday, June 4 – North of Spin Boldak, Afghanistan, militants exchanged fire with U.S.-led forces. There were no reports of injuries, but five militants were detained.

Saturday, June 5 – In Paktia Province, a convoy of Afghan and foreign staff preparing for the elections was ambushed. There were no injuries.

Sunday, June 6 – U.S. warplanes pounded dozens of insurgents hiding in caves near Tirin Kot.

- In Qalay-e Naw, Badghis Province, a grenade was tossed over the wall of the compound housing the Italian relief group Alisei. A vehicle and a water tank were damaged, but no one was injured.

Monday, June 7 – A U.S. soldier was killed and two others wounded after their vehicle hit a landmine in southeastern Afghanistan. They were taken to Kandahar airfield hospital where the one soldier died.

Tuesday, June 8 – U.S.-led coalition and Afghan forces completed a week-long operation in the Daychopan District of Zabul Province. Through the course of the operation, 73 rebel fighters were killed and 13 captured. Six Afghan government forces and four coalition soldiers were wounded, and none killed.

- Afghan interim president Hamid Karzai began a week-long visit to the United States. His first appearance was at Fort Drum, New York.

Wednesday, June 9 – Eleven Chinese aid workers from Jiangxi province were killed in their compound by a score of armed men in Kunduz, and another six were wounded. Taliban spokesman Abdul Latif Hakimi stated the Taliban were not involved.

- U.S.-led coalition troops swept portions of Uruzgan Province, capturing a score of insurgents and killing eight.
- Afghan interim president Hamid Karzai attends the G-8 Summit in Sea Island, Georgia.

Thursday, June 10 – In Kunduz Province, police chief Mutaleb Beg announced that two suspects were detained in connection with the previous day's massacre of Chinese aid workers.

- In the Bak District of Khost Province, a U.S. encountered three roadside bombs; one discharged. There were no casualties.

Friday, June 11 – In southeast Afghanistan, eleven rockets were fired at a U.N. convoy carrying government officials.

- During his visit to the U.S., Afghan interim president Hamid Karzai scrubbed his planned weekend visit to the Afghan community in California and began his visit to Washington by representing Afghanistan at the state funeral of former U.S. president Ronald Reagan. This marked the first time an Afghan head of state or government had ever attended a funeral of an American president.

Saturday, June 12 – In Shorabak, Kandahar Province, sixty rebels clashed with fifty Afghan National Army troops for over three hours. The rebels seized the outpost building and set it on fire.

Sunday, June 13 – Afghan interim president Hamid Karzai appeared on NBC's Meet the Press and on CNN's Late Edition.

Monday, June 14 – Afghan interim president Hamid Karzai held a press conferences with U.S. Defense Secretary Donald Rumsfeld beside a 9–11 memorial plaque on a section of The Pentagon's western wall.

Tuesday, June 15 – Afghan interim president Hamid Karzai addressed the U.S. Congress in the House Chamber. Karzai also met with U.S. President George W. Bush.

- In Kabul, a group of 100 protesters led by Mahfooz Nedaye and Sayed Abdul Hadi called for the resignation of Hamid Karzai on the grounds that his term of office had expired under the terms of the Bonn Agreement.
- In Kandahar, Hamid Agha, the local chief of refugees affairs was assassinated by gunmen on motorcycles. Three of his bodyguards were also wounded.

Wednesday, June 16 – In Kunduz Province, a NATO convey was bombed, killing a driver and three bystanders.

- In the HSBC-sponsored ACC Trophy at the Kilat Club at Kuala Lumpur, Malaysia, Afghanistan recorded its first win in an international cricket competition by defeating Bahrain by eight wickets.

Thursday, June 17 – Four suspects linked to the previous day's NATO convoy bombing were detained in Kunduz Province by Afghan officials.

- In an afternoon-long siege, hundreds of troops of Abdul Salaam Khan attacked Chaghcharan, the capital of Ghor Province.
- Two New Zealand Special Air Service soldiers were wounded in a pre-dawn gunbattle in central Afghanistan.
- The two U.S. soldiers were wounded when their vehicle struck a landmine north of Qalat, Zabul Province.

Friday, June 18 – In central Afghanistan, an Afghan interpreter was killed by militant gunfire, while two U.S. soldiers and two New Zealand soldiers were wounded.

- Rebels fired at least two rockets at the office of the United Nations High Commissioner for Refugees in Kandahar.
- Scores of rebels attacked a government office in Mezana District, Zabul Province, killing two Afghan National Army soldiers and wounding three during the two-hour exchange. Five attackers also died.

Sunday, June 20 – Three rocket-propelled grenades were fired at an electoral office near Kabul.

Monday, June 21 – In the Surkh Sang area of Arghandab District of Zabul Province, rebels kidnapped and beheaded an Afghan interpreter, prompting U.S.-led coalition forces and Afghan National Army soldiers to clash with the rebels, killing four of them. Naimatullah Khan, corps commander of southeastern Zabul province, initially stated that the Afghan soldiers avenged the interpreter's murder by beheaded the four rebels, but later retracted the statement. Three rebels were arrested.

Tuesday, June 22 – Seven rocket-propelled grenades were fired at a U.S. military base in Khost, slightly wounding two soldiers and three Afghan interpreters.

Wednesday, June 23 – Near Spin Boldak, five members of the Afghan National Army were killed and two others were seriously wounded when their vehicle hit a landmine.

Thursday, June 24 – In Kunar Province, two U.S. Marines were killed and another was wounded.

Friday, June 25 – In Uruzgan Province rebels kidnapped sixteen passengers of a bus and then killed them.

Saturday, June 26 – In Afghanistan, a bomb planted in a minibus carrying workers to voter registration sites from Jalalabad to the Shinwar District exploded, killing two Afghan U.N. election workers, and injuring three. Taliban spokesman Abdul Latif Hakimi claimed responsibility. The driver left the vehicle just before the explosion. He was caught by police shortly thereafter.

Tuesday, June 29 – Afghan National Army troops in Char Cheno District, Uruzgan Province, killed three rebel fighters.

- In Uruzgan Province, rebels stopped four trucks bound for a U.S. base, set them on fire, and abducted twelve men operating the vehicles.

Wednesday, June 30 – Bombs hidden in fruit carts exploded at two separate security checkpoints in Jalalabad, killing four and injuring 23.

- U.S. and Afghan National Army troops traded gunfire with rebels near Daychopan district, killing five and capturing seven. One Afghan soldier was wounded.

== July ==
Thursday, July 1 – Carmela Baranowska, an Australian journalist reported missing in Helmand Province, called her employer to say she was not being held hostage. She had not been seen nor heard from since June 28. At the time she was filming her documentary Taliban Country.

Saturday, July 3 – Police in Mazari Sharif made a large drug seizure and then accused regional military commander Mohammad Atta of being involved in the illegal trade.

Sunday, July 4, 2004 – In a ceremony in Philadelphia, Pennsylvania, Afghan interim president Hamid Karzai accepted the Philadelphia Liberty Medal.

- A roadside bomb exploded near Lashkargar, Helmand Province, injuring the mayor, Haji Manaf Khan, and his bodyguard.

Monday, July 5 – In the Karteh Parwan district of Kabul, local security forces arrested three Americans, including Jonathan Idema, and four Afghans after police raided an illegal jail.

Tuesday, July 6 – Afghan interim president Hamid Karzai and members of a U.N.-sponsored electoral commission met in Kabul, but failed to finalize on a date for the national and parliamentary elections.

- Intelligence agents captured Taliban members Mullah Sakhi Dad Mujahid and Nisar Hamed in a raid on a compound in Shah Wali Kot, Kandahar Province. Mujahid was carrying a cell phone containing phone numbers of top level Taliban leaders, including founder Mohammed Omar.
- U.S. Major Harry Schmidt was found guilty of dereliction of duty in regard to his killing of four Canadians on April 17, 2002, in Afghanistan.
- In a program organized by the UNHCR, the first of 525 Afghan refugees departed from Kyrgyzstan to Canada to start new lives.

Thursday, July 8 – In Khogyani District, Nangarhar Province, a landmine blast killed a female election worker and wounded at least two other people.

- In Afghanistan, a bus on the Kandahar-Kabul highway crashed when the driver lost control, killing eleven people and injuring forty-four.

Friday, July 9 – The Afghan Joint Electoral Management Body announced that Afghanistan's presidential elections would take place on October 9, 2004, and parliamentary would take place elections in the Spring of 2005.

Sunday, July 11 – A bomb exploded in Herat, killing six and injuring 34.

Wednesday, July 14 – Afghan interim president Hamid Karzai signed a decree to get full cooperation from militia commanders with the Afghan Disarmament, Demobilization and Reintegration Program (DDR). The decree stated that those who participate in activities against the DDR process will be considered disloyal and rebellious and will face severe punishment.

Thursday, July 15 – The United Nations removed its 17-person staff via helicopter from Ghor Province after its election office there was attacked by protesters. The mob had been protesting a checkpoint conflict that took place in Chaghcharan in which government troops killed two local militiamen.

Friday, July 16 – In the Spin Aghbarqa area in Zabul Province, rebels attacked a convoy of U.S. and Afghan National Armysoldiers on patrol along the Kandahar-Kabul highway, triggering a shootout that killed an Afghan Army soldier and an insurgent.

- U.S. Deputy Secretary of State Richard Armitage visited Kabul.

Saturday, July 17 – U.S. troops captured Taliban leader Ghulam Mohammed Hotak in Wardak Province.

Sunday, July 18 – An estimate 700 people spent nine hours demonstrating in front of government offices in Maydan Shahr, chanting for the release of Taliban leader Ghulam Mohammed Hotak.

- Less than a kilometer from the headquarters of NATO-led peacekeepers, a rocket landed on a house in the Shashdarak section of Kabul, killing a woman.mortally wounding a woman.

Monday, July 19 – In a village in Nawbahar District, Zabul Province, five suspected Taliban were caught by U.S. and Afghan National Army soldiers.

- In a village 100 miles northeast of Kandahar, troops confiscated nine motorcycles and about 10 rifles.
- Four men riding two motorcycles attacked two U.S. Humvees on patrol in Arghandab, Zabul Province, injuring one soldier.
- Dozens of rebels armed with assault rifles attacked the mayor's office in Naish District in Kandahar Province. One attacker was wounded and detained.

Tuesday, July 20 – Afghan interim president Hamid Karzai promoted three powerful warlords: General Atta Mohammad was made governor of Balkh province; General Khan Mohammad was made police chief of Kandahar Province; General Hazrat Ali was made police chief of Nangarhar Province.

- Afghan security forces captured Mullah Amanullah, a brother-in-law of Mohammed Omar, on Tuesday as he drove near Deh Rawood, Uruzgan Province. Three remote-controlled bombs and a cell phone as well as an AK-47 were found in his vehicle.
- Afghanistan freed 66 Pakistani prisoners caught fighting for the Taliban during the U.S.-led war in late 2001. Pakistan matched the move by releasing 34 Afghan prisoners.

Wednesday, July 21 – Eleven Afghan security personnel were killed in an ambush on their vehicle in Helmand Province.

Thursday, July 22 – Rebels killed a local security chief and 10 of his followers in an ambush in Helmand Province.

- In the district of Mama Karez, rebels attacked U.S. soldiers patrolling in a pickup truck. Three of the attackers were killed during the hour-long gunfight.
- Two rebels on motorcycles opened fire on two pickup trucks carrying Afghan election workers in Lashkargah.

Friday, July 23 – In Kandahar, a remote-controlled bomb exploded a U.S. military convoy passed, wounding between one and four soldier.

Monday, July 26 – A bomb exploded near a U.S. military vehicle 35 miles east of Qalat, Zabul Province, injuring three American soldiers traveling in an armored Humvee.

- Near central Kabul, a wing of the Jamhuriat Hospital, being rebuilt by a Chinese-Afghan construction consortium, collapsed, killing four and injuring 26.

Tuesday, July 27 – Afghan interim president Hamid Karzai formally declared his candidacy for the October 9 presidential elections. He dropped from his ticket Defense Minister Mohammed Fahim and replaced him with Ahmad Zia Massood. Karzai named Karim Khalili his choice for second vice president.

Wednesday, July 28 – At a mosque being used as a voter registration site in Ghazni Province, a bomb killed six, including two United Nations staff workers.

- Doctors Without Borders announced it was withdrawing its staff from Afghanistan because of security concerns.
- Two rocket-propelled grenades were fired at a construction site in Kabul where South Koreans were building a job training center for the Afghan people. There were no casualties.

Thursday, July 29 – In Brussels, the European Commission approved an extra €9 million to help fund the October 7 presidential elections in Afghanistan.

Saturday, July 31 – The United States government warned its citizens that the security situation in Afghanistan remained critical and that there was a general threat to all Americans visiting the nation.

- An Afghan official was killed along with his bodyguard during an ambush by rebels in Helmand Province. At least one other bodyguard was wounded.
- In Gujranwala, Pakistan local police picked up about thirty-five Afghan students (between the ages of six and fourteen) studying at a madressah in the Jamia Muhammadia on the Grand Trunk Road. Officials said the students were residing there without any passport, visa or legal documents which were violation of the Immigration Act. The students would be sent back to Afghanistan to obtain their complete documents and return for their studies.

== August ==
Sunday, August 1 – A three-day battle began between Afghan National Army and U.S. troops and militants near Zhawara, Khost Province. Coalition ground forces were assisted by U.S. B-1 Lancer, A-10 Thunderbolt II and helicopter gunships. Between 10 and 70 rebels were killed; at least one Afghan soldier was killed.

- Several people were killed in a gunfight between rebels and Afghan forces in Gurbuz District, Khost Province.
- In Kandahar Province, rebels threw grenades at the office of a demining group.
- In Logar Province, a bomb hit a vehicle carrying a mayor and a judge, killing three of the judge's children.

Wednesday, August 4 – Two Afghans, a field officer and his driver, working for Malteser Germany, a Catholic relief agency, were killed by gunmen in Zormat. As a result of the attack, Malteser suspended its operations in Afghanistan.

- Afghan Defense Minister Mohammed Fahim endorsed the presidential candidacy of Hamid Karzai.
- At an undisclosed school in Parwan Province, about 100 boy soldiers enroll in the Afghan New Beginnings Program.

Thursday, August 5 – As part of the Combatant Status Review Tribunals at Guantánamo Bay, Cuba, with hands bound and feet chained to a metal ring in the floor, an Afghan detainee pleaded for his freedom before the first U.S. military review tribunal partially opened to observers.

- In Kabul, authorities charged Reza Khan of murder, rape and highway robbery involving four foreign journalists on November 19, 2001.

Friday, August 6 – A convoy of ten U.S. vehicles east of Daychopan, Zabul Province, was ambushed by about ten rebels who fired rocket propelled grenades. One Humvee was struck, injuring five soldiers.

- Rebels set off a roadside IED near Qalat, Zabul Province, injuring three U.S. soldiers.
- In response to the killings of two relief workers on August 4, the UNHCR announced it was scaling operations down in southeastern Afghanistan.
- In Uruzgan Province, rebels ambushed a convoy of Afghan election workers, killing two.

Saturday, August 7 – Two U.S. soldiers and their Afghan interpreter were killed when their Humvee struck a landmine positioned along their route in Ghazni Province. A third soldier was wounded.

Tuesday, August 10 – Afghan election officials released the list of approved presidential candidates for the October 7 election; the list of seventeen included Hamid Karzai, Yunus Qanooni, Mohammed Fahim and Abdullah Abdullah.

Wednesday, August 11 – Mullah Janan, a Taliban military commander, was killed while leading an ambush on a U.S.-Afghan military convoy in Laghman Province.

- U.S. Defense Secretary Donald Rumsfeld visited Kabul.

Thursday, August 12 – A U.S. UH-60 Black Hawk crashed in Khost Province, killing at least one soldier and injuring fourteen. Four personnel were seriously injured and evacuated to the hospital at Bargam Air Base.

Tuesday, August 17 – U.S. warplanes bombed the forces of Amanullah near Herat. Khan's forces were engaged in fighting the militia backing Herat Province governor Ismail Khan. Amanullah agreed to a cease-fire.

- United Nations Secretary General Kofi Annan reported to the United Nations Security Council that more than 9.9 million people had registered to vote in Afghanistan, a number that exceeded the estimated total of eligible voters for the whole country.

Wednesday, August 18 – 18-year-old Friba Razayee became the first woman ever to compete for Afghanistan at the Olympic Games. She competed in judo against Spain's Cecila Blanco.

Thursday, August 19 – A bomb exploded in a U.N.-run voter registration building in Farah. Several security personnel were injured.

Saturday, August 21 – Three people were killed and two others critically wounded when their pickup truck tried to run a checkpoint in Ghazni Province. An infant in the vehicle was unhurt.

Monday, August 23 – Afghan interim president Hamid Karzai began a two-day visit in Pakistan, meeting first with Pakistan president Pervez Musharraf.

- Members of the Afghan National Army raided rebel hideouts near the border of Afghanistan and Pakistan.
- Twelve Afghan presidential candidates called for interim president Hamid Karzai to resign and to withdraw from the October 9 election. They argued that as an incumbent, he has an unfair advantage.

Friday, August 27 – Pashtun warlord Amanullah was brought by Afghan authorities from Herat to Kabul and held under arrest.

Saturday, August 28 – In Zabul Province, U.S. and Afghan National Army soldiers captured 22 Taliban suspects.

- Ten people, including nine children, were killed after a bomb exploded at a religious school in Paktia Province.

Sunday, August 29 – Georgia's 16th mountain battalion, commanded by Captain Shavleg Tabatadze, traveled to Germany for a two-week training before they embark on a 100-day mission in Afghanistan.

- At least nine children and one adult were killed when a bomb exploded in a school in Paktia Province.
- At least nine people were killed and dozens injured when a bomb hidden in a car exploded in front of the DynCorp office in Kabul. Taliban spokesman Mullah Hakim Latifi claimed responsibility.
- In Afghanistan, a Dutch AH-64 Apache on regular patrol over Kabul crashed, slightly injuring one crewman.
- In Kandahar, Afghan security forces arrested five men suspected of planning an ambush on U.S. troops., an Afghan official said.
- Iran opened its first bank, Arjan, in Afghanistan.

Monday, August 30 – NATO troops detained a man on the grounds of Kabul Airport and found traces of explosives on his hands. They then turned him over to local authorities.

- The U.S. Embassy in Afghanistan e-mailed U.S. citizens in Kabul, informing them to limit their movements, take strict security measures and avoid "potential target areas" such as government offices, military bases and upscale restaurants frequented primarily by foreigners.
- Eight people in Waradesh in Pech district in Kunar Province were killed and an Afghan aid worker injured when U.S. planes bombed the village.

Tuesday, August 31 – In Nangahar Province, security forces arrested two men, Afghan Hesmatullah and Pakistani Shahzada Gul, distributing Taliban leaflets calling for a holy war against U.S.-led coalition forces and the government.

- Afghan Foreign Minister Abdullah traveled to India to discuss a US$400 million Indian aid package for Afghanistan. He met with Natwar Singh and Prime Minister Manmohan Singh and other senior officials.
- NATO peacekeepers seized dozens of rockets, mortar shells and hand grenades from a truck which was trying to enter Kabul.
- In Kabul, Afghan intelligence agents arrested a bus driver with several guns and ammunition in his vehicle.

== September ==
Wednesday, September 1 – The Asian Development Bank pledged US$600 million to Afghanistan over the next three years.

- Near the village of Waradesh, at least six civilians died during a U.S. air raid.

Thursday, September 2 – Afghan Foreign Minister Abdullah visited India and met with Natwar Singh and prime minister Manmohan Singh to discuss a US$400 million Indian aid package for Afghanistan.

- In the Deh Rawood District, militants, armed with guns and grenades, attacked an Afghan National Army checkpoint on a bridge, wounding three soldiers.
- The Afghan National Army, backed by U.S. aircraft and artillery, killed several rebels in Khost Province.

Friday, September 3 – A jeep packed with explosives detonated at a roadside in the Jaikhoja area of Kandahar, killing one person and seriously injuring two others in a passing taxi.

- A U.S. patrol in the Khost Province was fired on by rebels travelling in a pickup truck, and a U.S. helicopter fired back, destroying the truck and killing one rebel.
- At a security checkpoint in Helmand Province, three rebels were killed, and five wounded in a clash.
- The Asian Development Bank granted US$750,000 to help Afghanistan improve its gas supply. The money was slated to draw a plan to establish an independent regulator for gas supply and help it come up with laws and regulations.
- Rebels fired up to four rockets over a U.S.-led civil-military base in Nangarhar Province, killing one Afghan National Army soldier and injuring another four.

Tuesday, September 7 – In northern Afghanistan, ten humanitarian workers were injured in an attack by demonstrators.

Thursday, September 9 – In Uruzgan Province, rebels attacked a U.S. patrol vehicle with rocket-propelled grenades, machine guns and small arms fire, wounding one soldier.

- In Kabul, five rockets were fired the ISAF base. Taliban spokesman Mullah Abdul Latif Hakimi claimed responsibility.

Saturday, September 11 – In Herat, dozens of supporters of Ismail Khan gathered outside his home after he was replaced as provincial governor, and began chanting slogans against the United States and Afghan president Hamid Karzai. Shots were fired by U.S. and Afghan security forces after their convoy was pelted with stones. Two people were killed, four injured and four arrested.

Sunday, September 12 – In Herat, hundreds of demonstrators, protesting the previous day's dismissal of Ismail Khan, ransacked and set fires at United Nations offices. At least seven people died and dozens more wounded. All US Special Forces fled the city. All violence was suppressed by 3rd and later 2d Brigade of the Central Corps (ANA) led by New Hampshire Army National Guard advisors (later reprimanded for their success by the U.S. Army). Follow on forces were able to enlarge the central defensive bubble in the city that disrupted the "riots". Many of these riots were led by external national forces. Later in the day, Khan appeared on television and called for his supporters to exercise restraint. Interim president Hamid Karzai chose Mohammed Khair Khuwa to replace Kahn.

- In Kabul, 363 Pakistanis jailed for fighting alongside the Taliban were released from the Pul-e-Charki jail and allowed to go home.
- An estimated 40 rebels attacked U.S.-led coalition soldiers, prompting two AH-64 Apache helicopters to open fire on the fighters, killing 22.
- Rebel gunmen ambushed a U.S.-coalition patrol near Kandahar.

Monday, September 13 – The United Nations withdrew dozens of its staff members from Herat, Afghanistan a day after mobs ransacked its offices.

Tuesday, September 14 – In Herat, Afghanistan, two men in a four-wheel-drive vehicle shot and killed a militiaman loyal to his ousted predecessor, Ismail Khan.

Wednesday, September 15 – In Kabul, an Afghan court sentenced Jonathan Idema and Brent Bennett to 10-year prison terms and Edward Caraballo to an 8-year term for participating in torture, kidnapping and running a private jail. Their four Afghan accomplices were sentenced to between one and five years in prison.

Thursday, September 16 – A rocket fired on but missed a helicopter carrying Afghan interim president Hamid Karzai as it prepared for landing in Gardez, where Karzai planned to open a school. The helicopter returned to Kabul without touching down in Gardez. Police later captured three suspects who confessed to firing the rockets.

Friday, September 17 – Afghan National Army forces searching for three missing elders kidnapped from the Maruf district in Kandahar Province, found two of them dead and the third wounded. All had multiple gunshot wounds. The survivor had injuries to the throat and stomach and was taken to the U.S. military base in Kandahar. The elders had been working to register voters.

- In Uruzgan Province, one boy was killed and another wounded during an exchange of fire between U.S.-led coalition forces and rebels.
- Afghan interim president Hamid Karzai eluded his U.S. security guards and drove into the Microrayon District of Kabul, where he walked around and conversed with local citizens.
- The United Nations Security Council voted unanimously to renew the mandate of the multinational security force in Afghanistan for another year until October 2005.

Saturday, September 18 – In Helmand Province, four gunmen riding two motorcycles ambushed the car of a militia commander, killing him and wounding two of his guards.

Sunday, September 19 – Afghanistan held an auction of capital notes to allow its banks to determine a market-driven interest rate. The two winning banks were Millie Bank and Pashtany Bank.

- The Afghan National Army established a regional command headquarters in the Kandahar region of Afghanistan.

Monday, September 20 – Afghan interim vice-president Nehmatullah Shahrani survived an assassination attempt when a remote controlled roadside bomb exploded next to his convoy in Kunduz Province.

- In Paktika Province, two U.S. soldiers were killed and two were wounded along with six Afghan National Armytroops in a clash with rebels near the Pakistani border.
- U.S. forces killed a rebel during an exchange of fire in the Deh Chopan District of Uruzgan Province.
- In Zabul Province, a U.S. air attack killed six rebels after rebels shot a rocket at a U.S. UH-60 Black Hawk.
- Two U.S. soldiers (Robert Goodwin and Tony Olaes) were wounded when a homemade bomb destroyed their Humvee in the Shinkay District of Zabul Province. The soldiers were flown to Germany for treatment.
- Three rockets were fired at the U.S. base in Paktika, landing within 100 yards of the compound.
- A roadside bomb attack on a U.S. convoy in Jalalabad, Afghanistan, caused no injuries.
- U.S. soldier, Wesley Wells, age 21, died when his security patrol was ambushed by rebels in Khost Province.

Tuesday, September 21 – In New York, Afghan interim president Hamid Karzai attended the opening of the United Nations General Assembly.

- Using pamphlets, Afghan warlord Gulbuddin Hekmatyar warned Afghan refugees in camps in Pakistan not to vote in the October presidential election.
- During a search operation in Kalatak village, Afghan National Army forces arrested Taliban commander Mullah Usman.

Wednesday, September 22 – About 130 paratroopers the U.S. 82nd Airborne Division left from Fort Bragg, North Carolina to Afghanistan to help provide security for the October elections there.

- Near Poshakan village in Uruzgan Province, a shootout began when two men on a motorcycle refused to stop when U.S. troops confronted them. The two men were killed. One was identified as local Taliban commander Mullah Dur Mohammed.

Friday, September 24 – The Asian Development Bank approved a loan to Afghanistan of US$5 million and a guarantee of US$10 million to provide political risk guarantees to eligible investors and financiers.

- Six Royal Air Force RAF Harrier II GR7 aircraft along with 315 British troops set off for Kandahar to replace six U.S. AV-8B Harrier II jets as part of a routine rotation of forces.
- A message from 300 elders of the Terezay tribe was broadcast by radio in Khost Province telling its members they must vote for Hamid Karzai in presidential elections in October or their houses would be burned.

Saturday, September 25 – former Camp X-Ray prisoner and Taliban leader Maulvi Abdul Ghaffar was among three rebel fighters killed during a raid in Char Cheno District, Uruzgan Province.

- Char Cheno District chief Malem Wali Jan was killed in a rebel attack during a security convoy in Uruzgan Province.
- Rebels killed nine Afghan National Army soldiers in attacks on several security posts in Helmand Province.

Sunday, September 26 – Iran announced that since March 20, more than 30,000 Afghan refugees had left the city of Isfahan to return to their country.

- Afghan interim president Hamid Karzai and General Abdul Rashid Dostum were present at a road project inauguration Shiberghan.

Tuesday, September 28 – Afghan General Abdul Rashid Dostum held a rally in Shiberghan for his presidential campaign bid and outlined his campaign issues.

Wednesday, September 29 – Afghan interim president Hamid Karzai inaugurated the Afghan National Museum in Kabul.

- Rebels attacked a government building the Khake Afghan District, Zabul Province in a clash that left at least three soldiers and four militants dead.
- Rebels attacked a convoy of U.S. and Afghan forces in Zabul Province.
- Four people were injured, one seriously, when two rockets were fired on the German Provincial Reconstruction Team in Kunduz.

Thursday, September 30 – In Orgun, two Afghan National Army soldiers were killed and seven wounded in a land mine attack on their convoy.

== October ==
Friday, October 1 – In Pakistan, hundreds of Afghan refugees, including women, lined up at special voting registration centers near Quetta and Peshawar.

- Former Afghan Education Minister Yunus Qanooni held a rally in Herat that drew several hundred people.
- Near the city of Spin Boldak, Afghan National Army authorities arrested 60 rebels who were planning to derail the upcoming presidential election.

Saturday, October 2 – Afghan presidential candidate Yunus Qanuni held a rally in Kandahar.

- Karim Khalili, the running-mate of Afghan interim president Hamid Karzai, held a rally at the Herat Airport.
- In Policharki district, local intelligence agents backed by ISAF peacekeepers arrested 25 people allegedly linked to the Taliban.
- Rebels killed two guards at the home of a former senior official in Uruzgan Province.

Sunday, October 3 – Afghan interim president Hamid Karzai visited Germany, where he met Foreign Minister Joschka Fischer and accepted a prize from the private organization Werkstatt Deutschland.

- Three members of a Japanese election monitoring team arrived in Kabul.

Tuesday, October 5 – Afghan interim president Hamid Karzai flew to Ghazni to speak to a crowd of about 5,000. While airborne, his helicopter was escorted by a U.S. AH-64 Apache and an A-10 Thunderbolt II.

- Yunus Qanuni held a presidential campaign rally before 2,000 people at a Kabul football stadium.
- In Mazari Sharif, Rashid Dostum held a presidential campaign rally.
- In Kandahar Province, seven policemen were killed when their vehicle drove over a landmine.

Wednesday, October 6 – In Badakhshan Province, an assassination attempt on vice-presidential candidate Ahmed Zia Massood killed one person and injured five others, including the former provincial governor.

Thursday, October 7 – In Moscow, Russia, Russia and France signed an agreement on military transits to Afghanistan via Russia. Signing for Russia was Sergei Lavrov, Minister of Foreign Affairs, and for France, Jean Cadet, Ambassador Extraordinary and Plenipotentiary to Russia.

Friday, October 8 – In London, England, the trial began for former Afghan warlord Zardad Khan.

Saturday, October 9 – In Afghanistan's first-ever direct presidential election, Hamid Karzai was elected President of Afghanistan.

Monday, October 11 – The Czech Republic voted to donate surplus weaponry (including submachine gun ammunition, hand grenades and signal rockets) to the Afghan National Army.

Tuesday, October 12 – In Vienna, Austria, the United Nations Office on Drugs and Crime hosted a meeting of United Nations officials and international policy-makers to address the heroin problem arising from Afghanistan.
