= Battle of Chora =

2007 battle during the War in Afghanistan

Coordinates: 32.8528°N 66.0847°E

- Part of the War in Afghanistan (2001–2021)
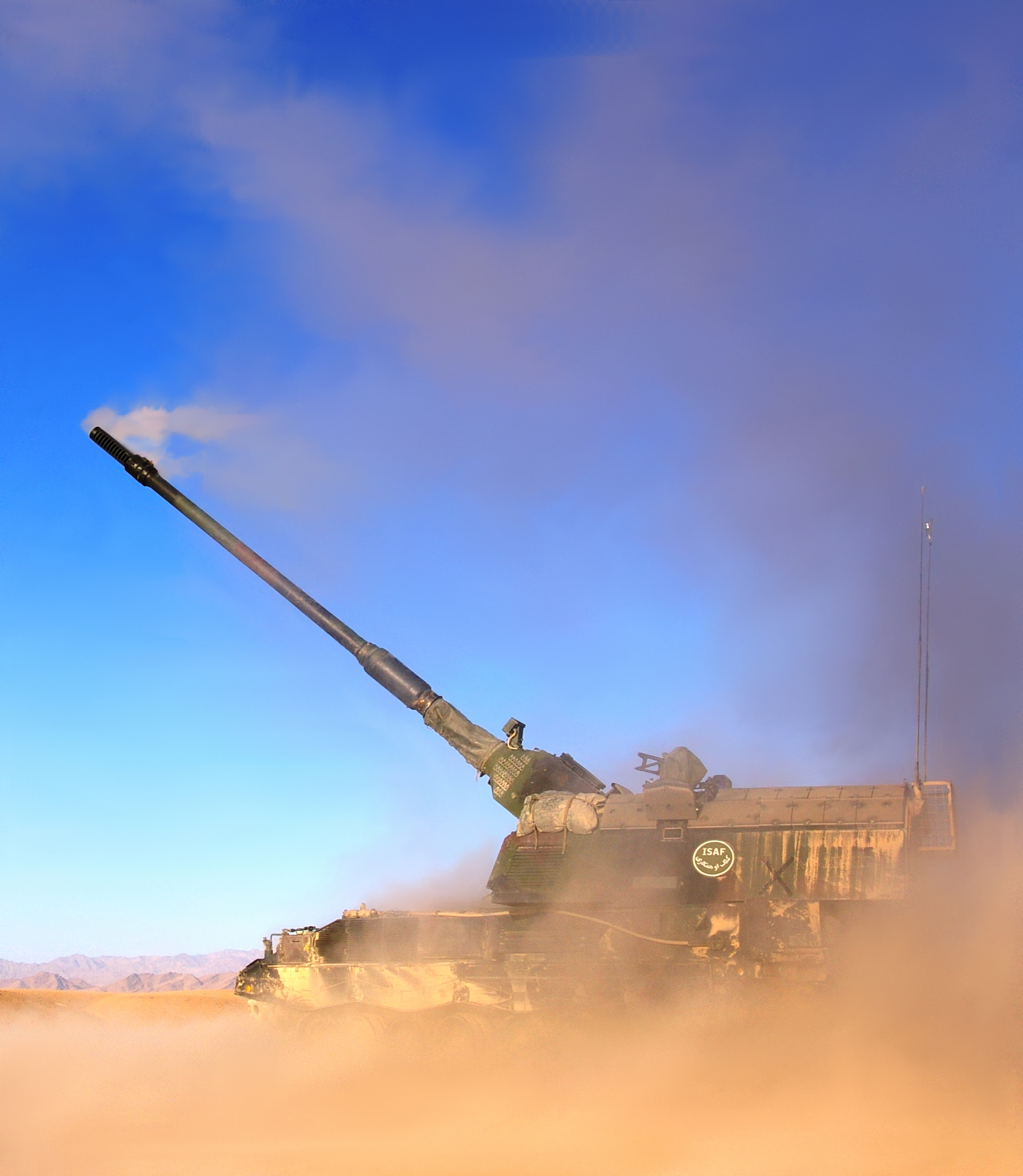
- A Dutch army PzH 2000 firing on Taliban positions in Chora. Photographed by David Axe on June 16, 2007.
Date	15–19 June 2007
Location	Uruzgan Province, Afghanistan
Result	Coalition victory

Belligerents
Coalition: Netherlands; Australia; Afghanistan	Anti-Coalition Militia: Taliban

Commanders and leaders
Colonel Hans van Griensven; Lieutenant Colonel Rob Querido; Captain Larry Hamers; Barakzai militia leader Rozi Khan	Shafiqullah Mohammadi Mulla Abdul-Qahir Mullah Mutalib †; Mullah Ismael †

Strength
500+ soldiers 100 police officers c. 100 militiamen	(Taliban) Unknown, possibly several hundred insurgents

Casualties and losses
16 killed 1 killed	(Taliban) 71 killed
- 50-80

The Battle of Chora was a military engagement in Chora District, Uruzgan Province, Afghanistan, occurring from 15 to 19 June 2007. The battle was between ISAF – primarily composed of Dutch troops – and allied Afghan forces against anti-coalition militias (ACM), believed to be affiliated with the Taliban. The battle centered on control of the Chora District's administrative center, a strategic location for the Taliban due to its role as a key ground route linking the contested Gizab District in the north to the provincial capital, Tarinkot. According to some press reports, the fighting was the largest Taliban offensive of 2007 in Afghanistan, and resulted in the death of one Dutch soldier, as well as approximately 50 to 80 civilians and 70 Taliban fighters.

== Background ==
In August 2006, the ISAF Task Force Uruzgan (TFU) assumed responsibility for Uruzgan Province, southern Afghanistan, replacing the U.S.-led Operation Enduring Freedom in the region. The TFU, led by the Dutch, comprised approximately 1,200 Dutch troops and several hundred Australian personnel. The Dutch military sought to restore its reputation, particularly after its failure to prevent the Srebrenica massacre in 1995. The Dutch government emphasized that the mission would prioritize reconstruction over combat.

The TFU established its two primary bases near the towns of Tarinkot (Kamp Holland) and Deh Rawood. Additionally, two patrol bases were positioned in the Dehrashan Valley and north of Deh Rawood. The operational strategy followed the inkspot strategy, focusing initially on securing small areas around the main bases before expanding control through the clear-hold-build approach and winning hearts and minds initiatives.

In February 2007, the second TFU rotation arrived under the command of Colonel Hans van Griensven. The Battle Group deployed in spring 2007 was led by Lieutenant-Colonel Rob Querido. A Dutch Special Operations Forces detachment, known as Task Force Viper, was also integrated into the TFU. A Provincial Reconstruction Team (PRT) was responsible for the reconstruction.

== Prelude ==
Prior to the start of the TFU, the 2006 Dutch/Australian Offensive (including the Operation Perth) had cleared the Chora area. However, as no Australian troops remained to secure the valley, the Dutch opted to conduct irregular patrols in the region to hold and build, despite the limited resources. Later, the PRT resumed development efforts, undertaking projects such as constructing a school, a mosque, and a bridge.

By February 2007, reports indicated a growing Taliban presence around Chora, with intentions to launch attacks in the area. Following several skirmishes, the Taliban seized an Afghan National Police (ANP) checkpoint on April 26, 2007, near Kala Kala, located near the Baluchi pass to the Baluchi valley. An initial attempt by the ANP, supported by a Dutch platoon, to retake the checkpoint failed, but a second attempt succeeded on April 29, 2007. This incident prompted the decision to permanently station two platoons, part of the company 'A-Coy' commanded by Captain Larry Hamers in Chora's capital, Ali Shirzai. They used the government building nicknamed the 'White Compound' as their base.

Despite these efforts, Taliban activity persisted, with frequent harassment of ANP and Dutch patrols. In response, Dutch forces launched a three-day operation from May 22 to 24, 2007, targeting the Baluchi Pass and the Dehrashan Valley. While the operation resulted in engagements with Taliban forces, a significant buildup of insurgents could not be confirmed. During a visit by the commanding officer of Regional Command South, British Major General Jacko Page, on May 24, the Dutch requested Afghan reinforcements. On June 6, 30 soldiers from the Afghan National Army (ANA) arrived in Chora, accompanied by three Dutch members of the Operational Mentoring and Liaison Team.

On the day prior to the arrival of the ANA, a Dutch reconnaissance unit was ambushed near Nowri, approximately 35 kilometers northeast of Ali Shirzai, by an estimated 100 insurgents. The unit successfully disengaged, and with air support, an estimated 25–40 Taliban fighters were killed. Aerial footage confirmed a buildup of Taliban forces, while intercepted communications featuring foreign languages corroborated reports of the presence of possibly experienced foreign fighters. Estimates of the total number of Taliban fighters varied: the Afghan National Directorate of Security and ANA placed the figure between 150 and 250, while other sources suggested numbers ranging from 300 to 1,000.

On 15 June, a Dutch platoon returning from securing a women's shura in Tarin Kot was targeted by a suicide bomber. The explosion resulted in the deaths and injuries of several Afghan civilians, as well as the death of Private First Class Timo Smeehuijzen and injuries to three other Dutch soldiers. Querido intended to give this platoon a three day-rest before deploying them again.

== Battle ==
=== June 16 ===
At 4 am, A U.S. A-10 Thunderbolt II spotted a group of at least 60 people moving toward Chora. The pilot asked the Dutch whether he was allowed to fire, but the Querido declined because there was too much uncertainty over their identity and intentions.

In the early morning, ANP checkpoints in Kala Kala, Nyazi (both to the west of Ali Shirzai) and Sarab (to the east) were attacked. Dutch troops in Chora moved to support the Afghan police. In the afternoon, the checkpoint Sarab was captured by opposing forces. Later in the day, the two other checkpoints fell to the opposing forces as well.

In Kamp Holland, Querido assessed the number of opposing forces at around 200, unsure whether this was part of the anticipated large scale attack. Together with Van Griensven, he looked for ways to relieve the pressure of the troops in Chora. Viper was sent to the Baluchi Pass, to draw the attention of opposing forces. Two other platoons (part of B-Coy) were moved closer to Chora as well to distract the opposing forces.

Skirmishes continued around the checkpoints, subsiding by 18:30. The coalition forces received air support during the fights. In the afternoon, the compound came under mortar fire, leading the coalition to reinforce its defenses with claymore mines and barbed wire. Meanwhile, Afghan soldiers established checkpoints and conducted patrols in Ali Shirzai.

==== Decision to stay or retreat ====
Amid ongoing fighting in the valley, Hamers questioned Querido and Van Griensven, asking, "What is Chora worth to us?" In response, Van Griensven convened a meeting with his advisors. Querido, the principal advocate for withdrawal, expressed doubts whether he would be allow to use the amount of force required to hold Chora. He adjusted his earlier estimate of 200 enemy fighters, warning that a potential of 1,000 could overwhelm the compound. Additionally, the difficulty of supplying the group with fuel and ammunition further complicated the situation.

Van Griensven, however, was also concerned about the implications for the civilian population in Chora. Reports had been received by the coalition indicating that locals had been executed or mutilated in acts of revenge. He further feared that a retreat would bolster Taliban propaganda and undermine the credibility of both the Dutch and ISAF missions, particularly in light of the Dutch failure to prevent the Srebrenica genocide.

Following a heated debate, Van Griensven ultimately decided to order his forces to hold their position and continue fighting. He decided to use all means available to him, which included both air power and a howitzer, the Panzerhaubitze 2000, stationed at Kamp Holland. Van Griensven stated that "in respect tot the 'rules of engagement', we will push ourselves to the limits of what is permissible". The Dutch Ministry of Defence, Ministry of Foreign Affairs and the Chief of Defence Dick Berlijn were informed of the decision. Van Griensven also informed Page, who according to Van Griensven agreed with the use of observed air support and unobserved artillery fire.

==== Reinforcements and evacuations ====
The howitzer would be used to fire west of Ali Shirzai. The Dutch asked local Chora leadership to inform civilians of the use of artillery fire and advise them to leave the area. The evacuation was confirmed by a local tribe leader and reporting from the Dutch troops in Ali Shirzai.

The Dutch requested the help of Australian Special Forces, but were informed they were not yet at full operating capability. The Australian Special Forces Operations commander, Major General Mike Hindmarsh, was also at unease with the unobserved artillery fire, which was not allowed by the Australian rules of engagement. In the early morning of June 17, diplomatic efforts were partially successful. The Australian Special Forces would be allowed to participate in combat operations, but not to enter the Chora District Centre.

The Dutch asked for the help of Rozi Khan, a local militia leader of the Barakzai tribe, with whom the Dutch were in good standing. Khan agreed to support the Dutch with around 100 fighters, although the number would vary throughout the battle.

The TFU also asked for additional ANA troops to reinforce the ANA/OMLT detachment already in Chora. Around 50 ANA soldiers were mustered in the night, accompanied by thee OMLT mentors. In two waves, they were flown with a Chinook to the white compound in the morning.

=== June 17 ===
Right after midnight, when no air support as available for the Dutch, the howitzer fired 30 155 mm grenades over two hours. The majority of the shells targeted open field near roads and crossroads to limit the risk of collateral damage. Another 28 guided bombs were dropped by aircraft that night, controlled by Dutch joint terminal attack controllers (JTACs). An estimated 50 anti-coalition militia were killed, as well as Afghan citizens who had not been evacuated.

Despite the assessment in Kamp Holland that the situation was particularly ominous, the situation had stabilised in Ali Shirzai. Hamers recalled: "All seemed relatively calm after a raging storm". Intercepted communication revealed that the bombardments had dealt significant casualties to the opposing forces, including their leadership. The troops also observed wounded and killed civilians, who had not left or were not warned.

Outside of Chora, Viper and two B-Coy engaged the opposing forces in the Dehrashan Valley. At the end of the day, B-Coy took up positions near the village of Shah Mansoor. Viper attempted to return to Kamp Holland, but one of their vehicles, the Patria, broke down. The quick response force (QRF) arrived, but with the wrong spare parts. Part of the Viper group returned to Kamp Holland to pick up the parts, while the other part remained to secure the location around the vehicle.

=== June 18 ===
On Sunday, June 17, and Monday, June 18, Dutch reinforcements arrived from Camp Holland and a second Dutch base in Deh Rahwod, increasing the number of Dutch troops at Chora to 500.

At one time, six Dutch F-16s were in the air, engaging ground targets assigned by the infantry.

On the night of Sunday, June 17, to the morning of Monday, June 18, during the loading of an L16 81mm mortar, which was deployed in the courtyard of the Chora District government building, a round exploded inside the launch tube, killing Dutch Sergeant-Major Jos Leunissen and wounding three other Dutch soldiers.

=== June 19 ===
At 9:30 a.m., NATO briefly withdrew the aircraft supporting the fighting at Chora, but air support was restored at 9:40 when Van Griensven reportedly threatened to withdraw the six Dutch F-16s from NATO command.

At 10:00, Dutch and Afghan troops, together with Rozi Khan's militia, made a push called "Operation Troy", in which they recaptured the three lost checkpoints.

== Sources ==
- Van Joolen, Olof; Schoonhoven, Silvan (2021). Schaduwoorlog Uruzgan: de rauwe werkelijkheid van de Nederlandse missie in Afghanistan (in Dutch). Amsterdam: Nieuw Amsterdam. ISBN 978-90-468-2915-8.
- Wiltenburg, Ivor; Leeuwenburg, Lysanne (2021). The Battle of Chora: A Military Operational Analysis of the 2007 Defence of the Chora District Centre in Uruzgan Province, Afghanistan. Breda: NLDA Press. ISBN 978-94-93124-12-7.
- Wiltenburg, Ivor; Leeuwenburg, Lysanne; Van der Vorm, Martijn (2022a). "De Slag om Chora. Deel 1: Een reconstructie van de junidagen in 2007" (PDF). Militaire Spectator (in Dutch). 191 (6): 312–325.
- Wiltenburg, Ivor; Leeuwenburg, Lysanne; Van der Vorm, Martijn (2022b). "De Slag om Chora. Deel 2: Zoekende tussen trots en controverse" (PDF). Militaire Spectator (in Dutch). 191 (7/8): 372–383.
