= Nish =

Nish may refer to:

- Anishinaabe, a group of culturally related indigenous peoples in what is known today as Canada and the United States
- National Institute of Speech and Hearing, an education and research institute in Kerala, India
- New Iberia Senior High, a school in south-central Louisiana, United States
- Nesh, Afghanistan, a village in Kandahar Province, Afghanistan
- Niš, a city in Serbia
- Sanjak of Niš, a sanjak of the Ottoman Empire
- SourceAmerica (formerly NISH), an American non-profit disability organization

== People ==
- Nish Bruce (1956–2002), British soldier and author
- Colin Nish (born 1981), Scottish footballer
- Colin Nish (Australian footballer) (born 1955), Australian rules footballer
- David Nish (born 1947), British footballer
- David Nish (businessman) (born 1960), British businessman
- Ian Nish (1926–2022), British academic and Japanologist
- Nish Kumar (born 1985), British stand-up comedian, actor, and radio presenter
- Mike Nish (born 1959), American racing driver
