= Task Force Uruzgan =

Dutch military operation

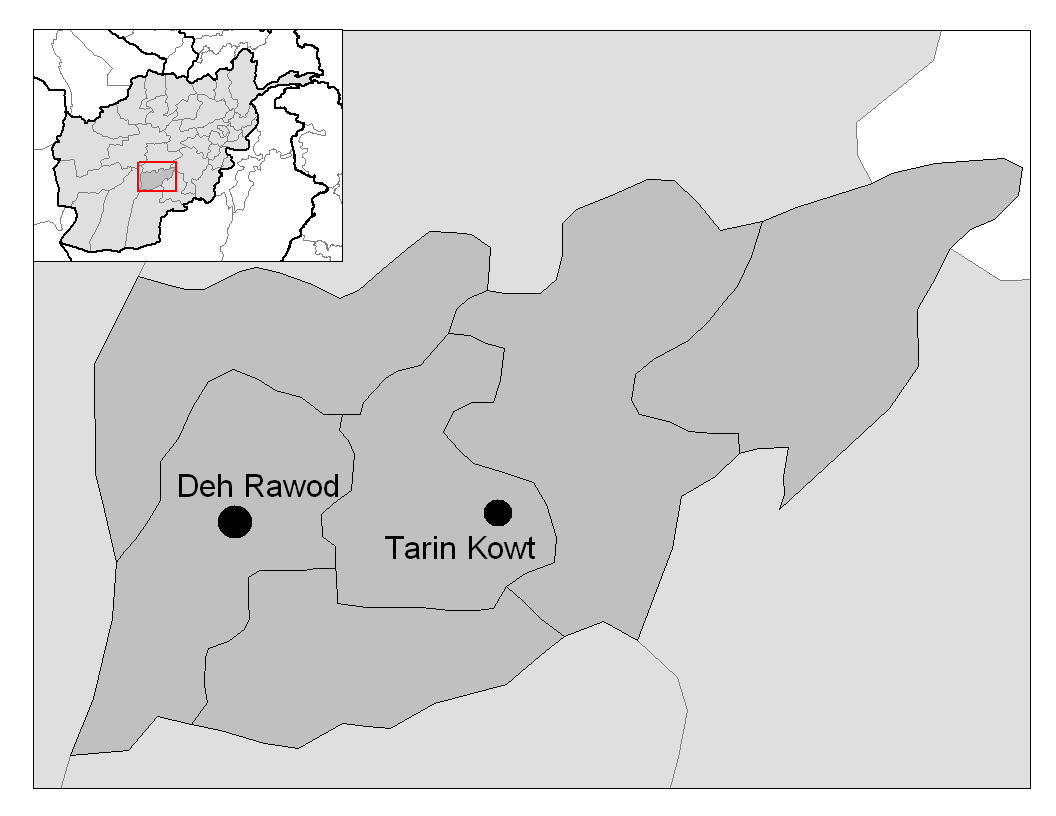
Map of Afghanistan's Uruzgan Province stressing on two of its six districts (Deh Rawood and Tarinkot)

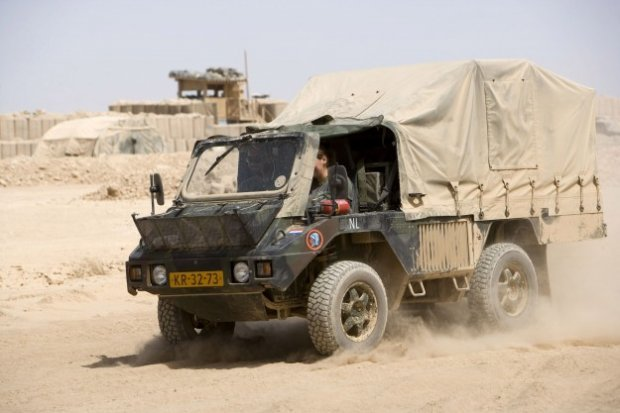
Dutch LSV operating in Task Force Uruzgan, 2006

Task Force Uruzgan (TFU) was Australia's and the Netherlands' contribution to NATO's Regional Command South, International Security Assistance Force, in Afghanistan. The Dutch led one of the four Provincial Reconstruction Teams in the southern region of the country. Mandated by the Dutch Parliament in February 2006, between 1,200 and 1,400 Dutch military were tasked to maintain order in Uruzgan Province through July 2010. They were also to develop political and economic infrastructure and to train the Afghan National Police.

The unit was located at one Main Operating Base (MOB) and a few smaller Forward Operating Bases (FOB): the MOB was Kamp Holland at Multi National Base Tarin Kot in Tarinkot, the capital of Uruzgan province. There were a few smaller FOBs Camp Hadrian 60 kilometres (37 mi) west of Tarinkot near a town called Deh Rahwod, FOB Coyote north of Deh Rawod near a place called Chutu and FOB Phoenix on the west bank of the Helmand river near the town of Tor Nasser.

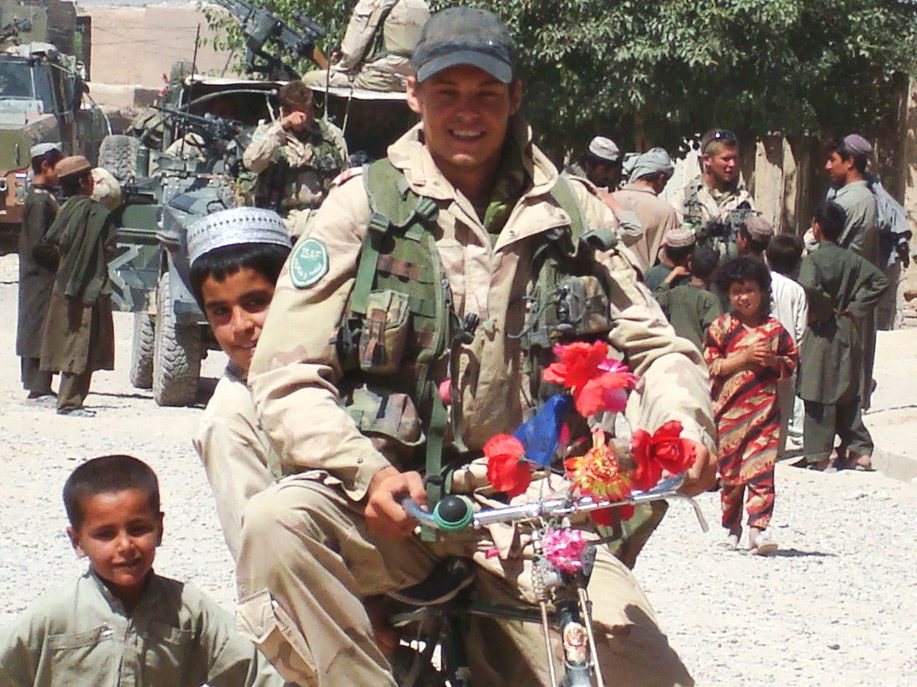
Timo Smeehuijzen, socializing with civilians in Tarinkot on June 15, 2007, about 90 minutes before a deadly militant attack on his convoy.

The TFU was under the command of Colonel Kees Matthijssen and consisted of a Provincial Reconstruction Team (PRT), a battlegroup and an air detachment. The battlegroup consisted of infantry with armored vehicles and artillery Howitzers, and was based around 13 Infanteriebataljon. Elements of 42 en 43 Brigadeverkenningseskadron were also based as part of the battlegroup. F-16 MLU's, six AH-64D Apache and five Eurocopter AS 532 helicopters of the Royal Netherlands Air Force were there to support them if needed.

The PRT was working together with Australian troops and the Afghan National Security Forces. During June 2007 a Taliban offensive and a Dutch counterattack proved to be the heaviest fighting in Uruzgan province since ISAF extended its Area of Responsibility to the south of Afghanistan. A large part of Task Force Uruzgan's battlegroup took part in the Battle of Chora. Around 25 Dutch soldiers, airmen and marines were said to be killed, including the son of general Peter van Uhm, the former Chief of the Netherlands Defence Staff, who was killed in a roadside bombing just one day after his father assumed command. About 140 Dutch were injured.

On May 29, 2009 Marco Kroon, who fought in Afghanistan, was awarded the Militaire Willems-orde, the highest medal awarded by the Netherlands, which has not been given to anyone for over 50 years.

In December 2009, the relatives of 21 Dutch military who died on foreign missions were presented with official government documents honoring the deceased. At a ceremony in The Hague Defence Minister Van Middelkoop (ChristenUnie) personally handed the documents to their relatives, who also received a commemorative sculpture.

In The Netherlands, the tradition to decorate military killed in action had been abolished, but was reinstated by Minister Van Middelkoop. Among the recipients was the Netherlands' Commander in Chief, General Van Uhm, whose son Dennis was killed in action in Uruzgan in April 2008, just a day after his father Van Uhm took over the command.

Timeline of Dutch casualties. Orange: casualties have been killed by accidents/suicides, Red: casualties due to combat.

All Dutch troops were scheduled to withdraw from Uruzgan in 2010. The United States took over from The Netherlands, stated Van Uhm during a television talk-show in May 2010. There was a proposal that Americans would continue the Dutch military's work in collaboration with Australia and Singapore, two other ISAF-members that also have troops stationed in Uruzgan. After August 2010, the Dutch were to be replaced by a U.S.-led coalition force including Australian, Slovak and Singaporean soldiers.

The departure of the Dutch troops started when the command was actually transferred to the United States and Australia on August 1, 2010. The Dutch Foreign Affairs Ministry said in a statement that the security situation in central Uruzgan province had improved "considerably" since the beginning of the Dutch operations. The province has 1,600 police officers of its own, a 100% gain in four years. There were 1,900 Dutch soldiers operating in Afghanistan. With this withdrawal, the Netherlands became the first NATO country to end its combat mission in Afghanistan. Taliban spokesman Qari Yousef Ahmadi congratulated the citizens and government of the Netherlands for this independent decision.
