= Rozi =

Rozi may refer to:

- Razi, Ardabil, a city in Iran
- Rozi Khan, Pashtun Barakzai tribal leader in Afghanistan
- Fatrurazi Rozi (b. 1978), Malaysian footballer
- MV Rozi, tugboat
- Lozi language, also known as Rozi, a Bantu language
- Rozi (company), a technology company
