= Ziauddin =

The name Ziauddin is a common transliteration of the male Muslim given name more correctly written Ḍiya ad-Dīn (Arabic: ضياء الدين). It means the “Shine of the Religion” It may refer to:

== People ==
- Ziauddin Barani (1285–1357), Indian historian and political philosopher
- Ziauddin Muhammad (flourished in the 17th century), scientific instrument maker in the Mughal Empire; one of the fourth generation of the Lahore family of astrolabists
- Ziauddin Ahmad (1878–1947), scholar and politician in colonial India
- Ziauddin Ahmad Suleri (1913–1999), Pakistani journalist and writer
- Mohammad Ziauddin (army officer) (born 1939), Bangladeshi military officer
- Zia Uddin (born 1941), Bangladeshi Islamic scholar
- Ziauddin Ahmed (Bangladesh) (1950–2017), Bangladeshi military officer
- Ziauddin Sardar (born 1951), Pakistani writer on Islam
- Ziauddin Ahmed Bablu (1954–2021), Bangladeshi politician
- Ziyaettin Doğan or Ziya Doğan (born 1961), Turkish football manager
- Ziaeddin Niknafs (born 1986), Iranian footballer
- Ziauddin Rizvi (died 2005), Shi'a cleric from Gilgit
- Qari Ziauddin (died 2010), Afghan militia leader
- Ziauddin Butt, a Pakistani military officer jailed as a result of the 1999 Pakistani coup d'état
- Ziauddin (Afghan militia leader), Afghan militia leader
- Muhammad Ziauddin Yusuf (born 1986), British businessman and politician

== See also ==
- Ziauddin Pur, census town in India
- Qarah Zia od Din, town in West Azarbaijan province, Iran
- Dr. Ziauddin Group of Hospitals, hospital group in Pakistan named in honor of Ziauddin Ahmed
- Ziauddin Medical University, medical school in Karachi, Pakistan named in honor of Ziauddin Ahmed
