= Goislard =

Goislard is a surname. Notable people with the surname include:

- Bettina Goislard (1974–2003), French UNHCR employee
- Joseph de Goislard de Monsabert (1887–1981), French general
