= Mirwais Sadiq =

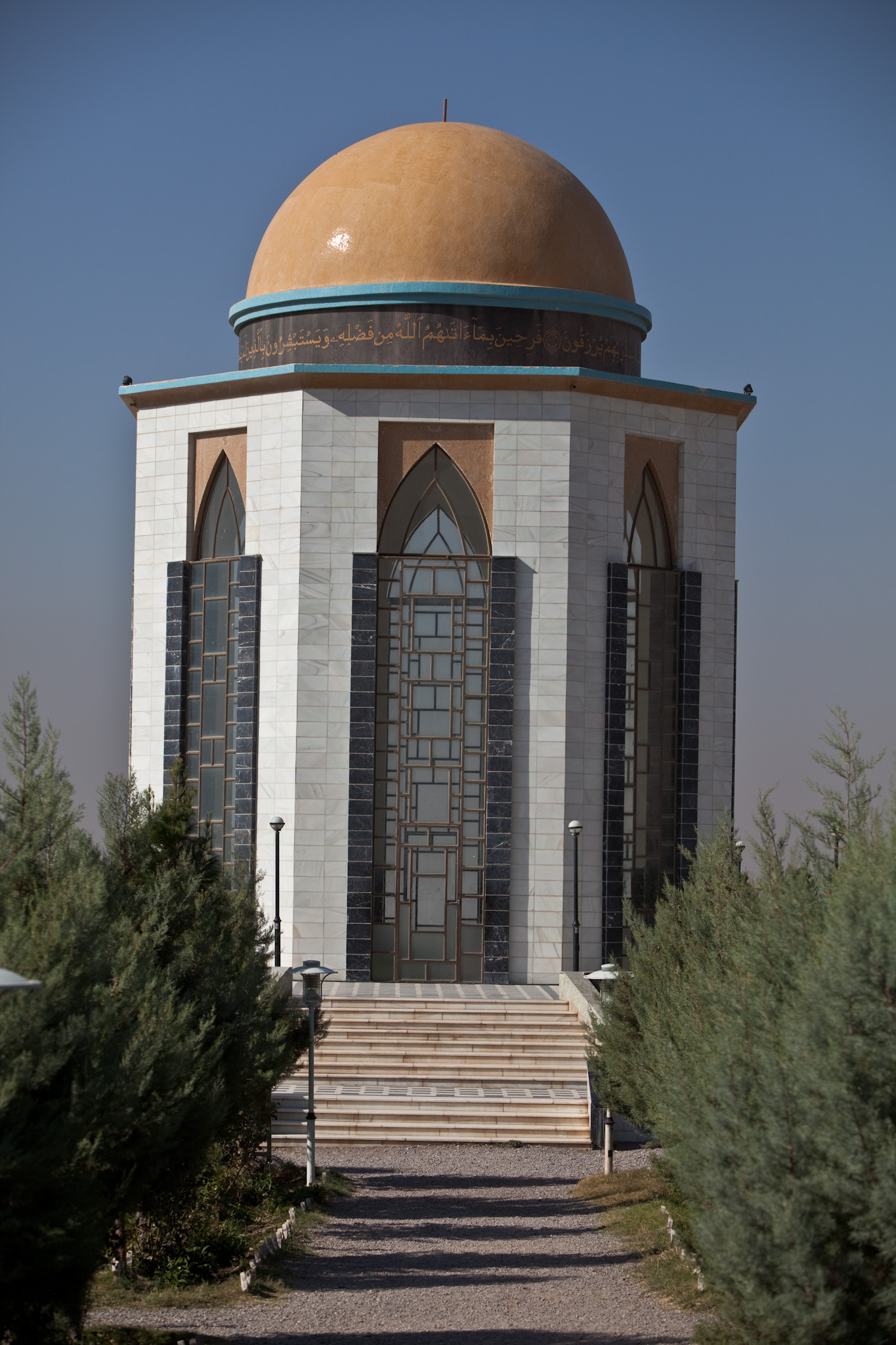
The Mausoleum of Mirwais Sadiq in Herat, Afghanistan

Mirwais Sadiq (1973 – March 21, 2004) was the Civil Aviation Minister of Afghanistan and the son of Ismail Khan, who at the time was serving as the governor of Herat Province.

Sadiq died in the city of Herat during a shootout between the forces of Zahir Nayebzada, a senior military commander in the Afghan Interim Administration, and Ismail Khan. Nayebzada claimed responsibility for the death, but insisted that Sadiq was killed in self-defense. Others accused Sadiq of "leading an attack on government forces when he was killed." Between 50 and 100 people were said to have died in the fighting. Nayebzada had escaped to Badghis Province.

== See also ==
- Ministry of Transport and Civil Aviation (Afghanistan)
- 2004 in Afghanistan
