= Regiment Stoottroepen Prins Bernhard =

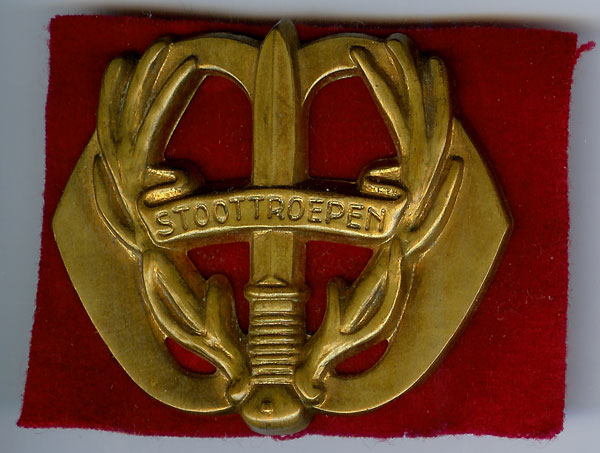
- Cap Badge of the Regiment Stoottroepen Prins Bernhard
- Active: 21 September 1944 - present
- Country: Netherlands
- Branch: Royal Netherlands Army
- Role: Air Assault Infantry
- Size: One battalion
- Part of: 11 Luchtmobiele Brigade
- Garrison/HQ: Johan Willem Friso Kazerne, Assen
- Mottos: Sterk uit overtuiging (Strong by conviction)
- March: Het commando
- Anniversaries: 21 September
- Engagements: Battle of Chora
- Decorations: Verzetsherdenkingskruis
- Battle honours: Noord-Brabant en Limburg 1944-1945; West- en Midden-Java 1946-1949; Midden-Sumatra 1947-1949; Uruzgan 2007

The Regiment Stoottroepen Prins Bernhard is an infantry regiment of the Royal Netherlands Army.

The Regiment Stoottroepen was founded on 21 September 1944 in Eindhoven, and composed of members of the Dutch resistance from those parts of the Netherlands that had been recently liberated from German occupation. The formation took place on the orders of Prince Bernhard, in his capacity as Commander of the Dutch armed forces. By the time of the surrender of the last German forces in the Netherlands, on 5 May 1945, the regiment had grown to some 6,000 men.

Following the liberation of the Netherlands, the regiment was incorporated into the RNLA, and its component battalions took part in the Police Actions against the Indonesian National Revolution in the Dutch East Indies 1946–1949. During the 1950s, the Dutch army underwent reorganisation, and the Regiment Stoottroepen was reduced to one battalion, the 41st Infantry Battalion. In due course, this unit was converted to mechanized infantry (Dutch: pantserinfanteriebataljon, abbreviated to "painfbat").

In 1994, 41 Painfbat was deactivated, and the lineage and colours of the Regiment Stoottroepen were taken over by the 13th Infantry Battalion and 11th Mortar Company, both of which form part of 11th Airmobile Brigade. Following the death of Prince Bernhard in 2004, the regiment was renamed "Regiment Stoottroepen Prins Bernhard" in his honour. In 2011 the Charlie Company took over the traditions of the ‘Margrietcompagnie’.
