= Dailanor =

Village in Afghanistan

- Village
- Location within Afghanistan
- Coordinates: 32.29054°N 65.73390°E
- Country: Afghanistan
- Province: Kandahar
- District: Nesh
- Time zone: UTC+04:30 (Afghanistan Standard Time)

Dailanor, also known as Daylanor, is a village in Kandahar Province of Afghanistan. It is located in Nesh District.

During the War in Afghanistan, 3 U.S. soldiers were injured near Dailanor when their convoy was ambushed in 2004. The village was considered to be a strohold of Taliban.

== See also ==
- War in Afghanistan
- Nesh District
- Kandahar Province
