= Inkspot strategy =

The inkspot strategy, also known as the inkblot strategy or oilspot strategy, is a military strategy for subduing a large hostile region with a relatively small military force. The occupying force starts by establishing a number of small safe areas dispersed over the region. It then pushes out from each area, extending its control and making the areas larger until eventually they join up, leaving only pockets of resistance.

The name of the strategy refers to the way ink spots spread on a piece of blotting paper or tissue, starting as tiny scattered points but spreading to cover most or all of the paper.

Historically, the inkspot strategy is associated with the Malayan Emergency and the Vietnam War. More recently, the term has been used in reference to the NATO campaign in Afghanistan and the American-led campaign against the Iraqi insurgency.
