= Colin Nish (Australian footballer) =

Australian rules footballer

Personal information
- Full name: Colin Nish
- Born: 14 December 1955 (age 70)
- Original team: Katunga

Playing career^{1}
Years	Club	Games (Goals)
1976 — 1977	Geelong	10 (0)
- ^{1} Playing statistics correct to the end of 1977.

Colin Nish (born 14 December 1955) is a former Australian rules footballer who played for Geelong in the Victorian Football League (now known as the Australian Football League).
