= Gul Nabi Ahmadzai =

Afghan politician

Lt. Gen. Gul Nabi Ahmadzai

Governor of Paktia
- Incumbent
- Assumed office 2 July 2021
- Preceded by: Mohammad Halim Fidai

Lieutenant General Gul Nabi Ahmadzai is the governor of Paktia Province and former commander of the Kabul garrison. The Attorney General's Office of Afghanistan decided to suspend him at the garrison after an incident where protesters at a mass demonstration were fired upon in 2017. He was appointed to be the governor of Paktia on 2 July 2021. Most of the previous provincial leadership had been sacked.
