= The Afghan Women =

Play by William Mastrosimone

The Afghan Women is a play by Emmy Award-winning playwright William Mastrosimone. It was produced by the Passage Theatre Company and premiered in 2003 at the Mill Hill Playhouse in Trenton, New Jersey. The first dozen performances raised US$10,000 for Afghan orphans. In January 2004, Mastrosimone presented a reading of the play to actors in Kabul which is the capital of Afghanistan.

== Plot summary ==
The play is set after the U.S. invasion of Afghanistan. The heroine is an Afghan woman who had fled her homeland during the Civil War, but now returns from the United States to found an orphanage. In the ensuing plot, a warlord fails as he attempts a coup. As he retreats, he tries to use the orphans as human shields, prompting the heroine to kill the warlord. She then inspires the warlord's vengeful son to find choices other than violence, a theme that is common throughout Afghanistan.
