= Sakhi Dad Mujahid =

Sakhi Dad
- Arrested: 2004-07, 2008-10; Uruzgan

Sakhi Dad Mujahid is the former Deputy Defence Minister of Afghanistan under Taliban rule, and is believed to have controlled as many as 2000 militants following the 2001 invasion of Afghanistan.

== Insurgent leader ==
A family relative of Mullah Omar, he was believed to have been closely connected with colleague Mullah Berader.

The American-backed government of Hamid Karzai had offered him a chance to surrender himself and "reconcile" with the federal authorities. It's estimated that he spent a million dollars monthly on his band of insurgents following the ground war with the United States.

== Captures ==
Mujahid was captured in Uruzgan along with a colleague on July 6, 2004 through his use of a Thuraya satellite phone registered in Quetta. His phone, list of phone numbers and expense book were all seized, and Afghan authorities made him phone Mullah Omar hoping to trace his location, but were interrupted when the Mujahidin leader abruptly hung up after Mujahid offered a code word indicating he'd been captured and was making the phone call under duress.

He was transported to American control at Bagram Airbase.

He was captured in 2008, described as his third capture. Sakhi Dad was captured based on the conclusion he had "broken his word" to cooperate with the Karzai government, and had been covertly leading a force of rebels.
