= Pashtany Bank =

Afghan statutory corporation

- Industry: Financial services
- Founded: Kabul, Afghanistan (1954)
- Headquarters: Kabul, Afghanistan
- Revenue: 894 Million AFN (2016)
- Owner: Government of Afghanistan
- Number of employees: At least 450 persons (2016)
- Website: pashtanybank.com.af

Pashtany Bank (Pashto: پښتني بانک) is a public bank which is managed by Da Afghanistan Bank. It was originally founded as a joint venture between the Afghan government and private investors by focusing on trade financing for exporters and importers. The bank was nationalized in 1974.

The bank experienced financial deterioration which halt its banking operations. The situation consist of state takeovers during the Democratic Republic of Afghanistan in 1979 and asset plundering and business restrictions during the Afghan mujahideen rule in 1992.

== History ==
Pashtany Bank was founded in 1955 under the name Pashtany Terjaraty to meet the needs of trade financing for exporters and importers for the export of cotton and dried fruits to China and Soviet Union. A joint venture between the government of Afghanistan and private Afghan investors found this bank by paying a capital 120 million Afghanis.

58.3 percent shareholder ownership was owned by the government through a few organisation such as Da Afghanistan Bank (DAB), Ministry of Finance, and the Ministry of Commerce. 33.3 percent shareholder ownership was owned by 1,000 private shareholders that manage the ownership through Agricultural Bank. An employee under Ministry of Finance administration owned the last 8.4 percent. Then, the bank was nationalized in 1974 under the rule of Mohammad Daoud Khan. They bought all the shares through Ministry of Finance with a 30% discount and owned all the share with DAB. The bank was operating well by expanding their trading client base by including exporters of carpets and karakul skin to Europe, dried fruits and medicinal herbs to India, and the import of Soviet equipment and machinery into Afghanistan.

The bank undergone its financial deterioration in 1979 during the Democratic Republic of Afghanistan. On the era, large businesses and properties were taken over by the state, imports and exports was being done as intergovernment trade that mainly done in barter with other communist countries. They also decrease trade with country based in western world. The second financial deterioration came in 1992 during Afghan mujahideen rule. Their assets were plundered and the government restricted their business. People with little banking knowledge was also appointed to manage the bank. Every cheque need to be authorized by the bank president and approval of intelligence officers. Mullah Omar was appointed as executive and made the bank were not permitted to pay or charge interest. All this problem led to the halt of their banking operation.

== Operational ==
Under Abdul Aziz Babakar khail's leadership, Pashtany Bank reached its highest loan recovery for three years since 2016 to 2018.In 2025, the bank has 32 branches throughout the country. Abdul Wahid Rahimi has become CEO since August 2024.
