= Shelter For Life =

Non-governmental relief and development organization

Shelter For Life International
- Website: shelter.org

Shelter For Life International (SFL) is a non-profit, non-governmental relief and development organization founded in 1982. It is dedicated to assisting people severely affected by war, conflict, or natural disasters, providing support to those displaced or made homeless. SFL operates in various countries, including Afghanistan, Iraq, Pakistan, Tajikistan, Haiti, and Sudan, with its headquarters in Minneapolis, Minnesota.

SFL addresses the need for shelter by constructing transitional and permanent homes. Families receive emergency assistance to protect them from hazardous living conditions, and SFL collaborates with them to rebuild communities and restore lives. The construction materials are sourced locally whenever possible, and families share responsibility in the rebuilding process.

For urgent situations, SFL helps families build durable transitional shelters using basic materials that can be reused for future permanent homes. These shelters offer immediate relief while providing sustainable long-term benefits, surpassing the temporary nature of tents.

SFL primarily focuses on constructing permanent, durable shelters using local architecture and simple designs that withstand natural disasters. Construction materials vary according to local culture and customs, including handmade mud bricks, concrete blocks, tin sheeting, and clay tiles. Beneficiary families actively participate in the construction process, supported by SFL's training, tools, and materials.

SFL's shelter designs have gained international recognition for their cost-effective measures that reduce damage from earthquakes and other disasters. Techniques such as reinforced walls, rigid wooden ring beams, and corner bracing enhance the structures' resilience. Additionally, SFL provides earthquake awareness and preparedness training to beneficiaries living in earthquake-prone areas.
