= Chora District =

Chora چوره
- District
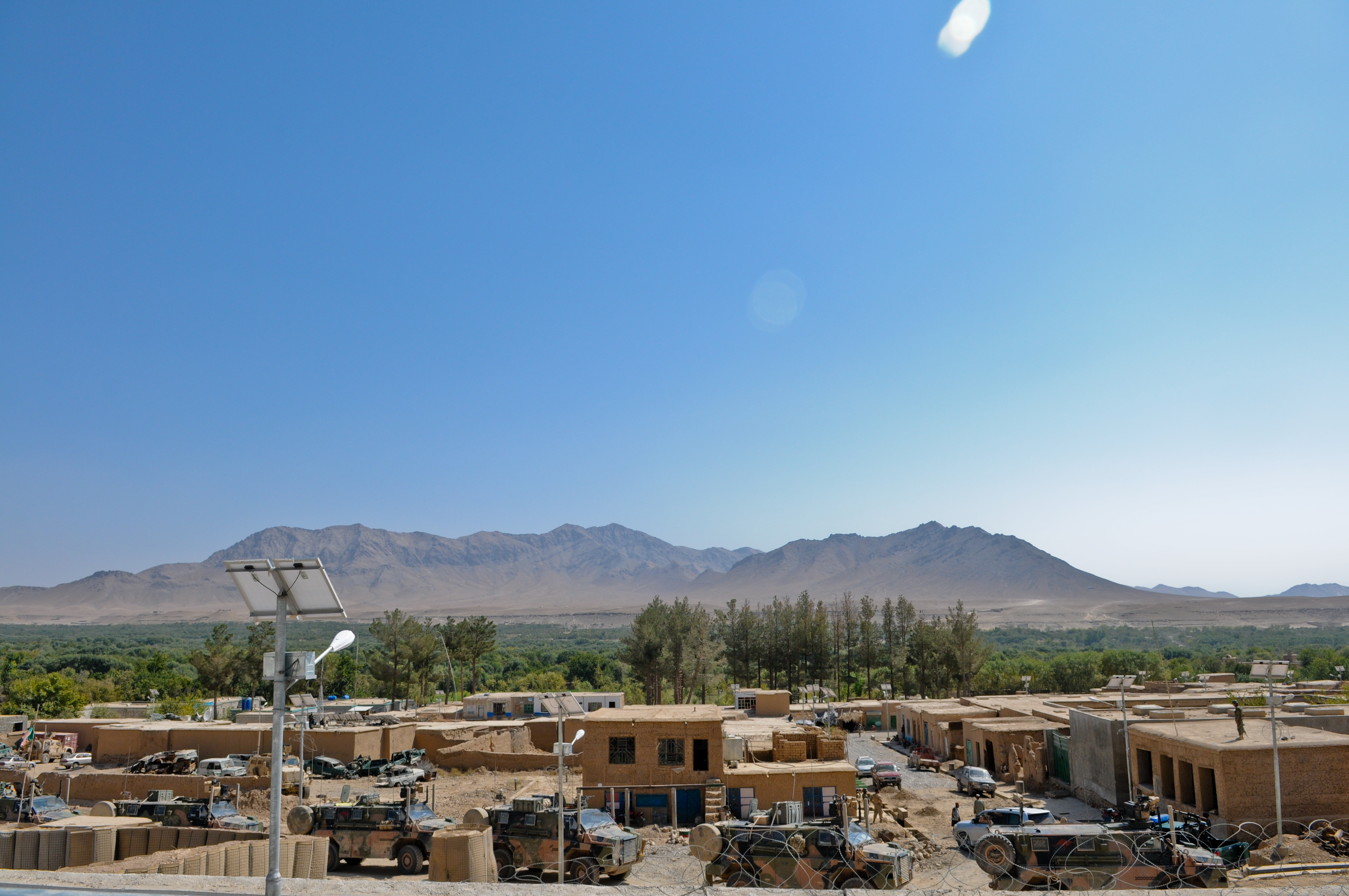

- Location within Afghanistan
- Coordinates: 32°50′50″N 66°03′00″E
- Country: Afghanistan
- Province: Uruzgan
- Capital: Chora

Area
  - Total: 3,005 km^{2} (1,160 sq mi)

Population (2006)
  - Total: 73,750
- Time zone: UTC+4:30

The Chora District is a district of Uruzgan Province, Afghanistan. The district center is the town of Chora, with a population of about 3,000. It is a rural town with no industry beyond livestock, agriculture, and small merchants.

A ribbon-cutting ceremony was held to officially open the Tarinkot to Chora Road Oct. 4, 2011. The Dutch State Secretary, Ben Knapen, along with the Uruzgan provincial governor, Mohammed Sherzad, held the ribbon-cutting ceremony to celebrate the completion of construction of the road that will better connect the Chora district to the provincial capital city by cutting travel time between the two by more than half.

== History ==
During the War in Afghanistan, the Battle of Chora took place in and around Chora during June 15–19, 2007. The fighting was between International Security Assistance Force and Afghan forces on one side and Taliban forces on the other, for the control of Chora, regarded by the Taliban as a tactical target because it provides ground access from unsecured Gizab district in the north to the provincial capital of Tarinkot. According to some press reports, the fighting was the largest Taliban offensive of 2007 in Afghanistan, and resulted in a Taliban defeat and the death of one American, two Dutch and 16 Afghan soldiers, as well as approximately 58 civilians and 71 Taliban fighters.
