= Chenartu =

Chenartu چنارتو
- Village
- Location within Iran
- Coordinates: 36°01′39″N 46°38′57″E
- Country: Iran
- Province: Kurdistan
- County: Saqqez
- Bakhsh: Ziviyeh
- Rural District: Khvor Khvoreh

Population (2006)
  - Total: 134
- Time zone: UTC+3:30 (IRST)
  - Summer (DST): UTC+4:30 (IRDT)

Chenartu (Persian: چنارتو, also Romanized as Chenārtū) is a village in Khvor Khvoreh Rural District, Ziviyeh District, Saqqez County, Kurdistan Province, Iran. At the 2006 census, its population was 134, in 29 families. The village is populated by Kurds.
