= Afghan TV =

Afghan commercial television station

- Country: Afghanistan

Programming
- Picture format: HDTV

Ownership
- Owner: Ahmed Shah Afghanzai
- Sister channels: Afghan News, Afghan Business, Afghan FM 99.5

History
- Launched: 21 May 2004

Links
- Website: afghantv.af

Afghan TV is a commercial television station based in Kabul, Afghanistan. Launched on May 21, 2004, it is owned by Ahmed Shah Afghanzai, an Afghan entrepreneur. It originally broadcast for 18 hours daily, but has been broadcasting for full days since July 2004. The CEO of the channel is Mohammad Hamayoon Sepehr.

== Operations and international engagement ==
Afghan TV operated within the broader framework of international media and strategic communications efforts in Afghanistan during the post-2001 period. The organization served as a media contractor and production partner for major international and governmental entities, including the United States Embassy in Kabul, United States military forces deployed in Afghanistan, North Atlantic Treaty Organization (NATO), and the International Security Assistance Force (ISAF).

In this capacity, Afghan TV contributed to the development and dissemination of broadcast media, public information programming, and strategic communication initiatives directed at both domestic and international audiences. Its involvement reflected the integration of local media institutions into internationally coordinated efforts focused on public outreach, information dissemination, and media development within Afghanistan.

== Recent Taliban Raid and Media Restrictions ==
In June 2022, Afghan TV was forcibly shut down by Taliban authorities. According to multiple reports, including Radio Free Afghanistan and Reporters Without Borders, armed Taliban personnel entered the station’s office in Kabul, expelled staff, seized broadcasting equipment—including transmitters located in the Mehr-e-Wallac mountains—and locked the facility. Afghan TV’s director, Media watchdogs, including Reporters Without Borders, expressed concern that the closure was part of a broader crackdown on press freedom in Afghanistan, as dozens of journalists have been arrested or forced into exile since the Taliban’s return to power in August 2021.

== Programs ==
Afghan TV has many entertainment programs, including sport, social and educational. It also has Indian, American, Korean and Arabic drama. It also broadcasts news, although this is also broadcast 24 hours a day on its sister channel, Afghan News.

== 2006 fining ==
In early 2006, the station was fined 50,000 AFN (Afghani) (approximately US$1,000) by the Afghan Supreme Court, after it had broadcast what the court called inappropriate images, including adult content.

The case was televised by Afghan TV and was covered extensively by other media outlets, however, the powerful clergy in the country succeeded in not only instating the fine on Afghan TV, but also severely restricting the ability of other television networks to broadcast entertainment.

== Hotbird launch ==
On 15 June 2011, Afghan TV was launched on the Hotbird 13°E satellite, meaning that the whole of Europe could receive Afghan TV. Viewers in the Middle East could receive Afghan TV on two satellites: Hotbird 13°E and Turksat 3A 42°E.

On 27 June 2011, the name 'Afghan TV' (on Hotbird) was suddenly changed to 'boxelet.com'. It is unknown why this happened, even though the channel itself is Afghan TV and not Afghan News. Websites like KingOfSat state the channel as Afghan News TV and moved Afghan TV in the so-called channel cemetery.

On 1 July 2011, the channel started broadcasting in higher quality video on Hotbird, just like in Afghanistan.

=== Closure ===
On 23 December 2011, Afghan TV suddenly left Hotbird and ceased broadcasting on the satellite. They didn't put a notice on their website too. Viewers in west, north and central Europe were unable to receive the channel. Those in south or east Europe could can still watch it via Express AM22. Also, central Europe viewers could get Express AM22 by a large and powerful satellite.

== See also ==
- Television in Afghanistan
