= Afghan New Beginnings Programme =

The Afghan New Beginnings Programme aimed to disarm, demobilise and reintegrate thousands of combatants from the Afghan Militia Forces/Afghan Army and provide them opportunities to join the Afghan National Army, Afghan National Police or an alternative line of work. The government of Afghanistan and the ANBP estimated that there might be 100,000 former combatants who could be integrated into civilian life.

The Canadian government has said that the mission was completed in July 2005, with 63,000 soldiers have been captured and integrated into civilian life. There are still an estimated 40,000 soldiers who are loyal to Mohammed Fahim.

The pilot phase of the operation began on 24 October 2003 and focused on Kunduz Province, Gardez, Mazar-e-Sharif, Kandahar, and Kabul.

The United Nations said on 4 January 2004:

The Ministry of Defense held a disbandment parade yesterday afternoon on the outskirts of Kabul. 326 soldiers from the 8th Division of the National Guard took part in the ceremony. This is a continuation of the pilot phase of Disarmament, Demobilization and Reintegration.. which began in Kabul on 9 December when 182 soldiers from the 2nd Division of the National Guard were disarmed. Today, these soldiers will be disarmed at Khair Khana Kottel, north of Kabul on the road leading to the Shomali Plains.

Later Bamyan Province was included. On 4 July 2004 disarmament began in Bamiyan, and on 15 July 2004 disarmament was continuing in Bamiyan including soldiers from the 34th and 35th Divisions of the then Afghan Army, often referred to as the Afghan Military or Militia Forces.

The deputy chairman of the commission responsible for the disarmament program is Afghan Urban Development Minister Yousuf Pushtun.

The senior DDR advisor from the United Nations Assistance Mission in Afghanistan (UNAMA) is Sultan Aziz.

The total budget for the DDR process is estimated at US$200 million, of which only $41 million had been secured by phase one, including $35 million from the Japanese government.

== Children and conflict in Afghanistan ==
The programme also aims to demobilise and reintegrate thousands of child combatants in Afghanistan. Many boys in Afghanistan were born into war. They have never known peace, but instead have encountered banditry and murder. The programme is funded by UNICEF.

== See also ==
- Military use of children
