= Iris Verification Center =

UNHCR centre in Afghanistan

Iris Verification Center is a UNHCR funded center for Afghan returnees, the technology was introduced by UNHCR-Pakistan in October 2002 to counter fraud attempts.

The Iris Verification process takes an image of an iris, storing it in the form of a number without recording the name, gender, age or destination. Because of the cultural sensitivity, female Afghan returnees are checked by UNHCR women employees to ensure their faces are not seen by male staff.

A sensitisation campaign was carried out among Afghan refugees living in camps and urban areas of Pakistan by UNHCR before the introduction of the iris verification system.

The UN Refugee Agency lowered the age limit for iris verification from 12 years to six years to prevent adults abusing children by hiring them out for repeated trips to Afghanistan.

UNHCR operates three Iris Verification Centers in Pakistan: one in Quetta and two in the North West Frontier Province at Alizai and the Hayatabad district of Peshawar.
