= Nesh, Afghanistan =

Village in Kandahar Province, Afghanistan

Nesh
- Location in Afghanistan
- Coordinates: 32°25′39″N 65°38′27″E
- Country: Afghanistan
- Province: Kandahar Province
- District: Nesh District
- Elevation: 4,941 ft (1,506 m)
- Time zone: UTC+4:30

Nesh (Pashto: نیش) (also: Nïsh, Naish نایش ) is a village and the center of Nesh District, Kandahar Province, Afghanistan. It is located on 32.4275°N 65.6408°E at 1,506 m altitude.

== See also ==
- Kandahar Province
