= Bettina Goislard =

French UN official (1974–2003)

- Born: 11 November 1974
- Died: 16 November 2003 (aged 29); Ghazni, Afghanistan
- Cause of death: Gunshot wounds
- Burial place: Kabul, Afghanistan
- Occupation: employee of United Nations High Commissioner for Refugees (UNHCR)
- Known for: first United Nations worker to be killed in Afghanistan since the fall of the Taliban in December 2001

Bettina Goislard (11 November 1974 – 16 November 2003) was a French employee of the United Nations High Commissioner for Refugees (UNHCR), assigned to its mission in Afghanistan. She was the first United Nations worker to be killed in Afghanistan since the fall of the Taliban in December 2001.

== Biography ==
Goislard, the daughter of career diplomat Bernard Goislard and his English wife, was born in Saumur, France. She got a degree in Arabic in Paris and Cairo . After graduation, was hired by the UNHCR in June 1999 for a field assignment in Rwanda. She spent almost three years there, assisting refugees to return. She then moved on to Guinea and then Afghanistan in June 2002.

In Afghanistan, she was involved in the UNHCR's efforts to help about 50,000 displaced Afghan refugees return to their homes in and around the city of Ghazni in the southeast of the country.

== Death ==
On 16 November 2003, while driving through the streets of Ghazni in a clearly identified UNHCR vehicle, Goislard was shot at point-blank range by two men on a motorcycle. She was pronounced dead upon arrival at a hospital some minutes later. Her two assailants were caught and beaten by a local crowd, and then taken into custody by local security forces.

On 18 November 2003, the Taliban claimed responsibility for her murder, citing Goislard's Christianity as their motivation. The UN immediately scaled back its efforts in Afghanistan, withdrawing its international refugee workers from four provinces. Two days later, in accordance with her wishes, Bettina Goislard was buried in Kabul.

=== Trial ===
On 10 February 2004, her two assailants Zia Ahmad and Abdul Nabi, both government employees under the former Taliban régime, were convicted of the murder and sentenced to be executed. The men are said to be planning an appeal against the decision. A month later, Taliban rebels kidnapped a Turkish highway engineer and his Afghan driver and threatened to kill them unless Ahmad and Nabi were released. The Turkish engineer and his Afghan driver were released unconditionally a few months later.
