= Nesh District =

District in Afghanistan

Nesh (Pashto: نېش ولسوالۍ) is a mountainous district in the northern part of Kandahar Province, shifted from Oruzgan Province, Afghanistan. It borders Oruzgan Province to the west, north and east and Shah Wali Kot, Khakrez and Ghorak districts to the south. The population is 14,884 (2019). The district center is the village of Naish, located in the central part of the district.
