= Qari Ziauddin =

Qari Ziauddin (died October 5, 2010) was a local militia leader in Afghanistan's Badakhshan Province, the province in the extreme Northeast.

According to Pakistan's Daily Times Qari Ziauddin and five of his men were captured on February 12, 2004 following a gun-battle over the drug trade. Police commander General Sayed Akbar Sayedi said that Qari Ziauddin had engaged with Musadeq, another powerful local militia leader and the mayor of Ordo. According to the International Institute for Strategic Studies 20 civilians were killed during the fight. Musadeq was not taken into custody.

CTV quoted Deputy Interior Minister Hilalludin Hillal, who stated the two militia leaders had clashed many times in the past. Several hundred troops from the central government were sent to quell the fighting, which broke out February 5, 2004. The central government's own army only numbered 7,000 troops.

The ISAF International Security Assistance Force had 200 German troops stationed in Badakhshan, but the Associated Press had been unable to reach them, for comment, and stated that they were not believed to be involved in the incident.

== Death ==
On October 5, 2010, an airstrike in northwestern Afghanistan killed Taliban leader, Qari Ziauddin, who was the Taliban's shadow governor in Faryab province. He was "directly associated with and took direct operational orders from a Pakistan-based leader of the northern front," according to NATO's International Security Assistance Force. When coalition forces went to the site of the strike in Faryab province, armed people threatened them, "the security force engaged and killed four insurgents and confirmed Qari Ziauddin was killed during the airstrike," according to the International Security Assistance Force.
