= Deh Rawood =

- Location in Afghanistan
- Coordinates: 32°37′35″N 65°28′13″E
- Country: Afghanistan
- Province: Uruzgan Province
- Time zone: UTC+4:30

Deh Rawood is a town in Deh Rawood District in Uruzgan province, Afghanistan. It is located 400 kilometres southwest of Kabul. Since the U.S. invasion of Afghanistan the area has been noted as a remaining Taliban stronghold. The area is rural with mountainous, roadless terrain.

== See also ==
- Uruzgan Province
