= Rozi Khan =

Tribal leader of Afghanistan

Rozi Khan was a Pashtun Barakzai tribal leader in the Afghanistan province of Orūzgān. In the 1980s he was a Mujahideen commander fighting against the Soviets. In 2001 he was appointed police chief of Orūzgān province by President Karzai, a position he held until 2006. He was made governor of Oruzgan's Chora District in mid-2008.

Khan's loyalties were suspect, and he often changed sides in political and military struggles. Nevertheless, he was considered a hero in the Netherlands after coming to the assistance of a Dutch unit.

Rozi Khan was killed by friendly fire on 17 September 2008 in the town of Chora in firefight involving Australian SAS soldiers (part of the NATO-backed ISAF). Rozi received a phone call from a friend who said his home was surrounded by armed men and he feared the Taliban had come to kill him. Rozi then grabbed his gun and, with two of his armed men, ran through the darkness towards his friend's home. There were several armed groups out that night, including Afghan National Police and an Australian special forces patrol. Seeing Rozi and his men heading towards them, the Australians thought they were insurgents and shot Rozi and his two men dead.
