= Deh Rawood District =

Deh Rawood دهراود
- District
- Location within Afghanistan
- Coordinates: 32°37′35″N 65°28′13″E
- Country: Afghanistan
- Province: Uruzgan Province
- Seat: Deh Rawood

Deh Rawood is a district in Uruzgan Province, southern Afghanistan, and the name of the town that serves as district seat. Deh Rawood lies along the Helmand River. The tribes in the district are Pashtun, dominated by the Noorzai and Populzai sub-tribes.

The Netherlands, representing the NATO International Security Assistance Force (ISAF) force in Uruzgan Province, has established a military base in Deh Rawod, adjacent to pre-existing U.S. and Afghan Army bases.

== Security and Politics ==
Government includes a district governor, chief of police, court, line departments, and three district shuras:

- A 29-person development shura composed of tribal elders and engineers who monitor the implementation of development projects.
- A 40-person tribal shura.
- A 73-person malikan (village representative) shura that serves as a contact point for international actors.

On 19 November 2009 it was reported that a suicide bomber blew himself up in Deh Rawad district in a crowded area. The attack killed 10 and injured 13.

On 17 December 2009, another suicide bomber blew himself up but failed at his attempt to get inside of the district headquarters.

On 16 December 2020, the Taliban launched a surprise attack on the district, killing 20 ANDSF members including the district's deputy police chief of the district. The Taliban occupied the bazaar of the district before being pushed out by remaining militia forces in the area.

On 29 December 2020, a Taliban flag was reported to have been flown over the city's center, indicating that Afghan forces have left the area.

== See also ==
- Deh Rawood
- Abdul Ghani Baradar
- Mohammed Omar
- ISAF
  - Provincial Reconstruction Team
  - Multi National Base Tarin Kot
  - War in Afghanistan order of battle, 2012
  - List of Afghan Armed Forces installations
  - List of NATO installations in Afghanistan
