= List of governors of Paktia =

This is a list of the governors of the province of Paktia, Afghanistan.

== Governors of Paktia Province ==
Governor	Period	Extra	Note
Pacha Khan	2001–2002		
Taj Mohammad	2002–2002		
Raz Dalili	2002–2004		
Assadullah Wafa	2004–2005		
Hakim Taniwal	2005–2006		
Rahmatullah Rahmat	2006–2007		
Juma Khan	17 December 2007–2015		
Nasratullah Arsalah	2016–2017		
Shamim Katawazai	2017–2020		
Halim Fidai	2020–2021		
Mullah Haji Hamza	2021–7 November 2021		
Maulvi Ali Jan Ahmad	7 November 2021–September 2023		
Mullah Muhrullah Hamad	September 2023–Incumbent		

== See also ==
- List of current governors of Afghanistan
