= Ajmal Omar Shinwari =

Afghan military commander

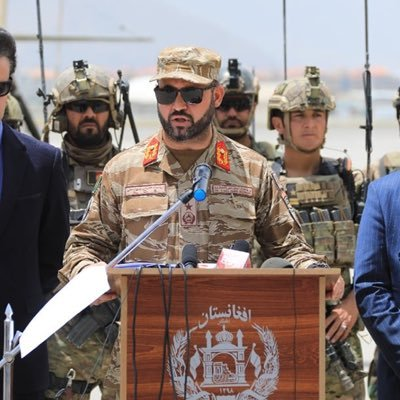
- Brigadier General Ajmal Omar Shinwari during a security briefing in Kabul, June 2021.
- Born: Nangarhar Province, Afghanistan
- Military career
- Allegiance: Islamic Republic of Afghanistan (2001–2021)
- Branch: National Directorate of Security (NDS)
- Service years: 2010–2021
- Rank: Brigadier General
- Units: National Directorate of Security (NDS); NDS 05 Unit (LFG); NDS 097 Special Forces
- Conflicts: War in Afghanistan (2001–2021); 2021 Taliban offensive

Ajmal Omar Shinwari is a former high-ranking Afghan military commander and intelligence official who served as the final unified Lead Spokesperson for the Afghan National Defense and Security Forces (ANDSF) during the 2021 Taliban offensive. A Brigadier General within the National Directorate of Security (NDS), Shinwari held several elite command and staff positions over an eleven-year career in Afghanistan's primary intelligence agency, including serving as the Commander of the 097 Special Forces. Since 2023, he has been based in the Netherlands as a geopolitical intelligence expert.

== Early life and political career ==
Shinwari was born and raised in the Nangarhar Province of eastern Afghanistan. Before his formal entry into the national intelligence services, he served as the Chief of Staff and Chief of Campaign for presidential candidate Ali Ahmad Jalali during the 2009 Afghan elections (2008–2009), managing strategic political operations and national coordination.

To prepare for high-level command roles, Shinwari underwent specialized professional development both domestically and in Washington, D.C., focusing on Strategic Operations Management and Intelligence Reporting. This training allowed him to bridge the gap between traditional Afghan military tactics and modern international intelligence management.

== Intelligence and military career (2010–2021) ==
Shinwari worked in the National Directorate of Security (NDS), Afghanistan's premier intelligence and counter-terrorism agency, for 11 years.

=== Special units and headquarters command ===
Between 2010 and 2021, Shinwari held three leadership positions that spanned tactical command and strategic security:

- First Deputy of the 05 Units (2010–2015): Shinwari served as a key commander within the NDS 05 Unit (part of the NDS Special Units/LFG), a high-tier paramilitary force tasked with counter-terrorism and sensitive kinetic operations, particularly in eastern Afghanistan.
- Chief of Security of the NDS Headquarters (2015–2020): For five years, he was responsible for the operational and physical security of the NDS central command in Kabul. This was a critical role during a period of frequent insurgent attempts to infiltrate and attack government institutions.
- Commander-in-Chief of NDS 097 Special Forces (2020–2021): In 2020, he was promoted to lead the 097 Special Forces, an elite NDS strike force. In this capacity, he held overall responsibility for the strategic deployment and combat readiness of specialized units during the height of the conflict with the Taliban and IS-K. During this time, he authored the military leadership manual entitled "Important Notices for the Commander."

=== Lead spokesperson for the ANDSF ===
In June 2021, Shinwari was appointed as the unified Lead Spokesperson for the ANDSF by Ashraf Ghani, representing the Ministry of Defense, the Ministry of Interior, and the NDS. Operating from the Government Media and Information Center (GMIC) in Kabul, he became the public face of the Afghan resistance during the final months of the Republic, providing daily televised briefings and countering insurgent propaganda.

== Career in the Netherlands ==
Following the Fall of Kabul (2021), Shinwari relocated to the Netherlands. In September 2023, he joined the Utrecht-based firm Dyami Security Intelligence as a Geopolitical Intelligence Expert. In this role, he provides strategic analysis on global security threats and regional stability in Central Asia. He also documents and reports on the status of former Afghan security personnel.

== Published works ==
Shinwari has contributed to military science and geopolitical analysis through several professional publications:

- Important Notices for the Commander Is a specialized military manual and tactical guidebook for Afghan National Defense and Security Forces (ANDSF) officers. The work focuses on leadership, operational discipline, and the ethics of command during counter-insurgency operations.
- Psychological Operations in Asymmetric Warfare: A series of professional papers and doctrinal contributions regarding the use of strategic communication and information warfare to counter insurgent propaganda in Afghanistan.
- The Rise of IS-K and Regional Stability: Recent strategic analytical reports published through Dyami Security Intelligence (2023–2024), focusing on the evolving threat of Islamic State – Khorasan Province and its impact on Central Asian and European security.
- Documenting Amnesty Violations: Research and reporting on the post-2021 security landscape in Afghanistan, specifically documenting the status and safety of former ANDSF personnel under the current administration.
