= Firebase (U.S.-Afghanistan War) =

Firebases in the U.S.-Afghanistan War, are a type of military base, usually fire bases.

It may refer to:

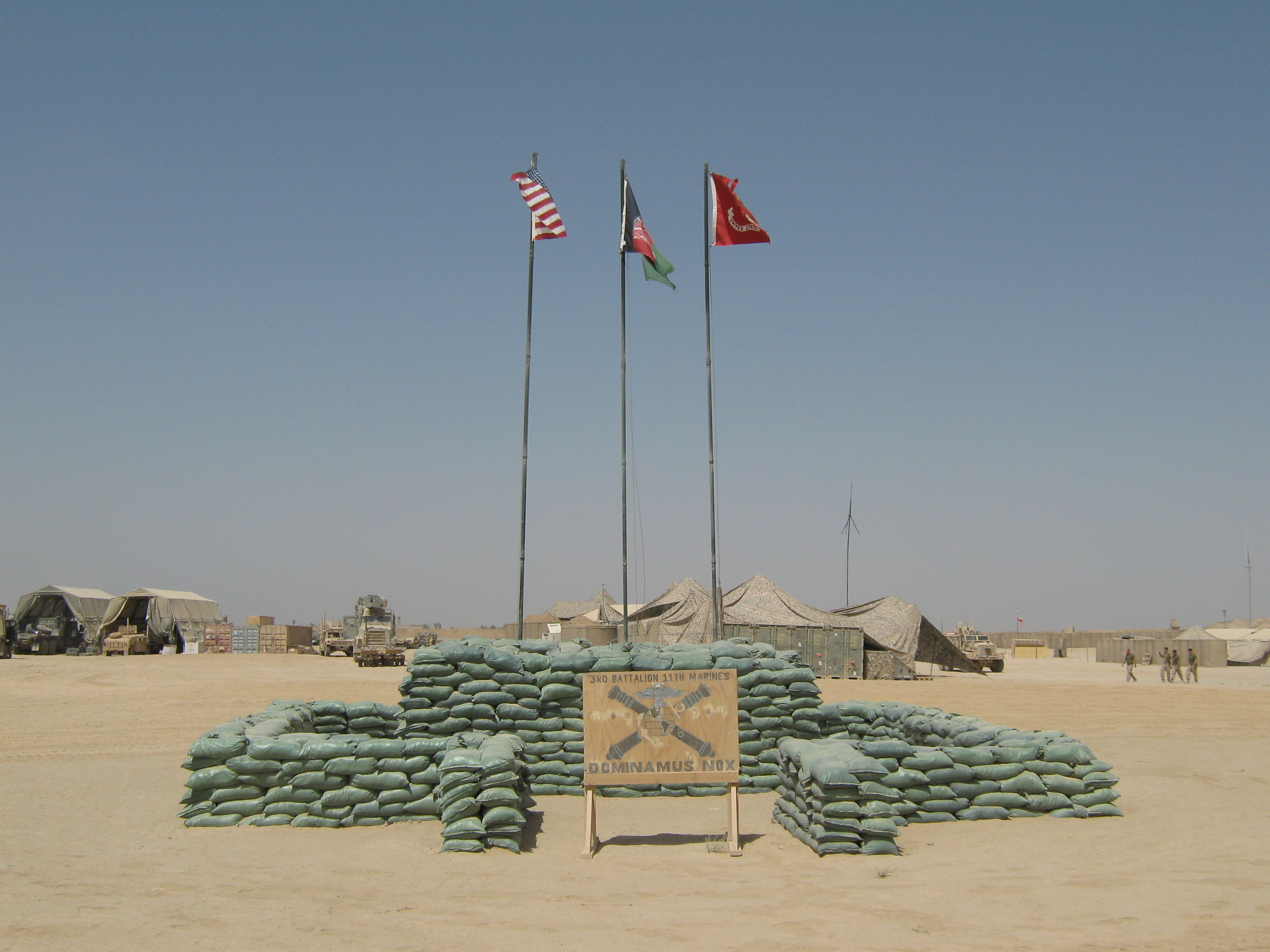
Fiddler's Green

- Firebase Anaconda, Uruzgan province; involved in the Battle of Firebase Anaconda
- Firebase Fiddler's Green, Helmand Province
- Gardeyz Firebase, Paktia Province
- Firebase Lilley, Paktika Province
- Firebase Phoenix, Kunar Province
- Firebase Tinsley (Firebase Cobra) Oruzgan Province
- Firebase Wilderness, Paktia Province

== See also ==
- Firebase Bell, northern Iraq
