= Juma Khan Hamdard =

Afghan politician (born 1959)

- جمعه خان همدرد
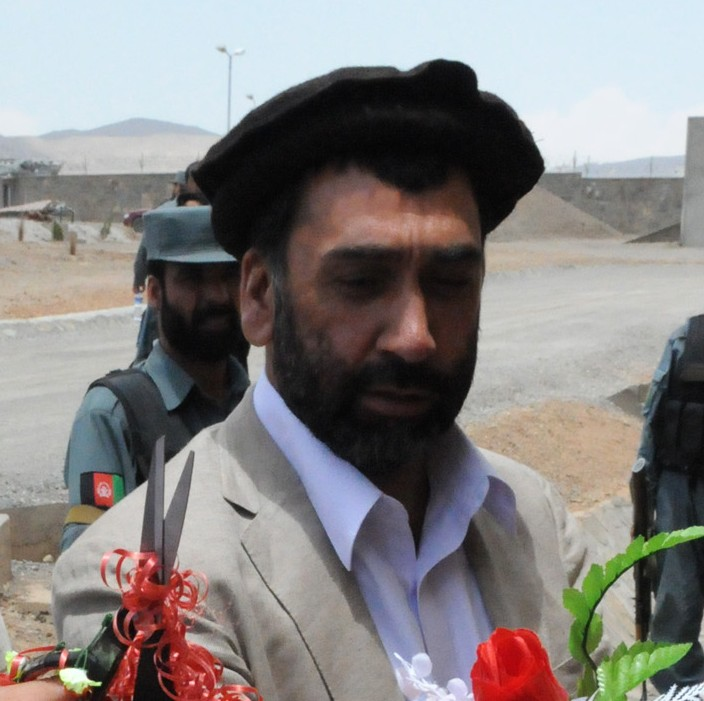
- Hamdard in 2010

Governor of Paktia
- In office 17 December 2007 – 2 April 2015
- Preceded by: Rahmatullah Rahmat
- Succeeded by: Nasratullah Arsala

Governor of Jowzjan
- In office September 2006 – 2007
- Preceded by: Roz Mohammad Nur
- Succeeded by: Mohammad Hashim Zare

Governor of Baghlan
- In office 4 February 2005 – 4 September 2005
- Preceded by: ?
- Succeeded by: Mohammad Alam Rasekh

Personal details
- Born: 1959 (age 66–67) Balkh Province, Kingdom of Afghanistan
- Children: Gul Rahman, Mohammad gul, Javid, Bashir, Abdullah and Obaidullah

Juma Khan Hamdard (Pashto: جمعه خان همدرد; born 1959) is an Afghan politician. He served as the security adviser to President Ashraf Ghani. He served as governor of Paktia Province from 2007 to 2015, previously serving as governor of Baghlan and later Jowzjan province. He is the head of the alliance of H.A.A Councils.

== Early life ==
Hamdard is an ethnic Pashtun of the Wardak tribe from Mazari Sharif. He was born in 1959 in Balkh Province.

== Career ==
He became a popular leader of the Pashtun community of Balkh and Mazar-i-Sharif. Hamdard was a member of Hezbi Islami and fought against the Soviets under the leadership of Gulbuddin Hekmatyar. In 1994, his Party Hezbi Islami allied with Abdul Rashid Dostum, an ethnic Uzbek, against the Shura-e Nazar. In 1997, he helped the Taliban's side against Dostum's forces in a bloody campaign.

Following the US-led coalition's invasion of Afghanistan in late 2001, Hamdard resumed a weak alliance with Dostum's forces. On the eve of the presidential election in October 2004, he pledged support to Karzai. He became governor of Baghlan, and later Jowzjan.

Dostum's power base was in the ethnic Uzbek heartland. His Uzbek supporters did not want an ethnic Pashtun as governor. In May 2007 police forces under governor Juma khan Hamdard shot at militant Uzbek demonstrators, while they were trying to force their way into the Governor's office in Sheberghan, killing 13 and injuring more than 30. On December 17, 2007, he was appointed governor of Paktia Province, replacing Rahmatullah Rahmat. Hamdard is one of President Karzai's tribal affairs advisors.

A former military commander, Juma Khan Hamdard is considered an important personality of northern Afghanistan where he has played a central role in safeguarding the interests of Pashtuns since the fall of the communist regime in 1992. Thanks to this advocacy, he enjoys a strong base of support among Pashtun settlers in the region.

== Personal life ==
He has six sons, the eldest of which, Gul Rahman Hamdard, is a member of parliament.

Preceded by Rahmatullah Rahmat	Governor of Paktia, Afghanistan; 2007–present	Succeeded by Incumbent
Preceded by Roz Mohammad Nur	Governor of Jowzjan, Afghanistan; 2006–2007	Succeeded by Mohammad Hashim Zare
Preceded by ?	Governor of Baghlan, Afghanistan; 2005	Succeeded by Mohammad Alam Rasekh
