= Mohammad Shoaib Risalat =

Governor of Samangan, Afghanistan

Mawlawi, Mullah Mohammad Shoaib Risalat
- محمد شعیب رسالت

Governor of Samangan
- Incumbent
- Assumed office 28 May 2024
- Supreme Leader: Hibatullah Akhundzada
- Preceded by: Mawlawi Abdur Rahman

Governor of Faryab
- In office October 2022 – 28 May 2024
- Supreme Leader: Hibatullah Akhundzada
- Preceded by: Hafizullah Pahlawan
- Succeeded by: Abdul Ahad Fazli

Governor of Jowzjan
- In office November 2021 – October 2022
- Supreme Leader: Hibatullah Akhundzada
- Preceded by: Mohammad Hashim Raees
- Succeeded by: Gul Haidar Shafiq

Mullah Mohammad Shoaib Risalat (Pashto: محمد شعیب رسالت), alternatively Damullah Mohammad Shoai Risalat, is an Afghan Taliban leader who is currently serving as governor of Samangan Province, Afghanistan.

== Career ==
Shortly after the withdrawal of NATO forces from Afghanistan in the summer of 2021, Taliban Supreme Leader Haibatullah Akhundzada appointed Mohammad Shoaib Risalat to serve as the governor of the northern province of Jowzjan, ethnically comprising a mix of Uzbeks, Turkmen, and Pashtuns. Risalat served as provincial governor for nearly a year before his rotation to serve as provincial governor in Jowzjan's western neighbor, Faryab Province. After 19 months, a tweet from Taliban spokesman Zabihullah Mujahid confirmed on 28 May 2024 that Risalat had rotated to serve as governor of the central-northern province Samangan, swapping seats with Abdul Ahad Fazli.

=== Governor of Faryab ===
In a September 2023 speech as provincial governor of Faryab, Risalat emphasized a need for further educational development stating "We want a standard educational system that fit [sic] to our beliefs and cultural values." At the event, the then Acting Higher Education Minister Sheikh Neda Mohammad Nadeem announced long-term plans for the construction of a "Medicine University" in Faryab.

During Risalat's tenure, Faryab was identified as one of six provinces which appeared to continue providing education to girls despite the national blanket ban on women's education. The United States-based outlet Amu Television reports that Faryab hosts 599 schools with 423,000 students, 42% of them female. An interviewed grade 10 female student stated "The officials of the [provincial] Department of Education asked students not to bring the issue of schools being open to the attention of the media so that the high-ranking officials do not order schools to close like [they did] in Paktika."

=== Governor of Samangan ===
In July 2024 and while provincial governor for Samangan, Risalat issued a statement praising the resolution of a violent inter-family feud in his province. Risalat stated "To ensure the development of society, there must be unity and brotherhood among the Muslims. There must not be any room for enmity which ruins the future of our children."

== Personal life ==
Risalat's ethnic background is reportedly Uzbek, a group which accounts for approximately 8.8% of Afghanistan's population as of 2023.
