= Rahmatullah Rahmat =

Afghan politician (born 1950)

- رحمت الله رحمت
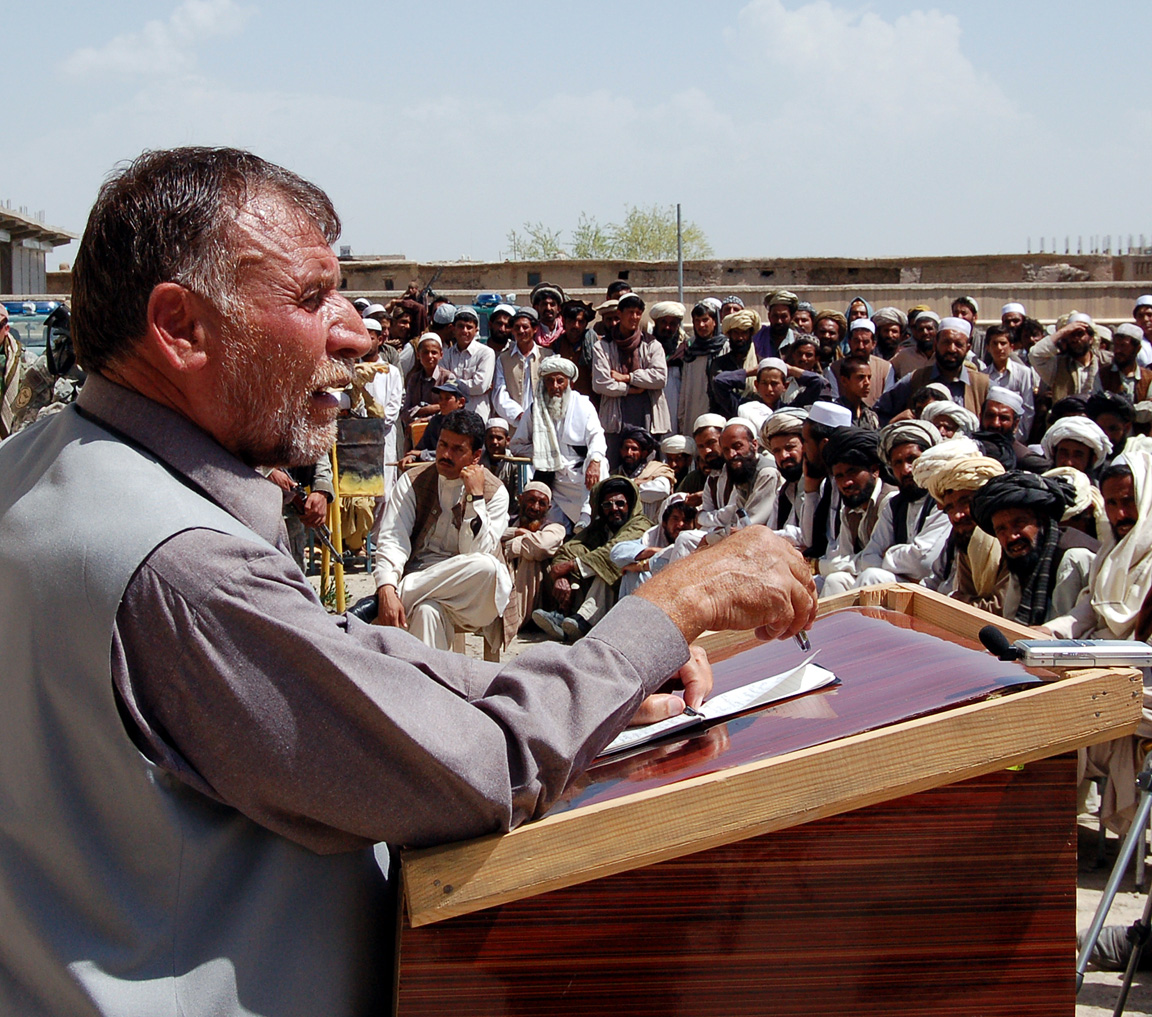

Governor of Paktia Province
- In office September 2006 – 17 December 2007
- Preceded by: Hakim Taniwal
- Succeeded by: Juma Khan Hamdard

Political Affairs Officer UNAMA
- In office June 2008 – June 2012

Provincial governor Paktia Province, Afghanistan
- In office June 2006 – September 2007

Political Affairs Assistant UNAMA Paktia Province, Afghanistan
- In office June 2005 – September 2006

Personal details
- Born: 2 May 1950 (age 75) Rodat District, Nangarhar, Kingdom of Afghanistan
- Party: Independent
- Spouse(s): Habiba rahmat(1979-now) 6 sons and 7 daughters
- Profession: Political analyst, Politician
- Awards: MOE Award year 2006

Rahmatullah Rahmat (Pashto: رحمت الله رحمت; born 1950) is an Afghan politician. He served as the governor of Paktia province from 2006 to 2007. He was appointed to the position after the assassination of Hakim Taniwal. Rahmat was previously an official of the UNAMA mission in the east of the country.

He was born in Rodat distract Nangarhar Province, Afghanistan to Mohammad Ibrahim. He completed his secondary education in Ihdad High school located in Rodat distract, Nangarhar Province, Afghanistan.

== Life and education ==
Rahmatullah Rahmat was born in 1950 in Rodat District in Nangarhar Province. He is an ethnic Pashtun from the Mohmand tribe whose father was a mullah in Nangahar. He attended primary and secondary school in Rodat and later received degrees from the Kabul teacher training academy (1969) and from Tashkent University in Uzbekistan (1987). He also studied in Moscow in 1987-89 where he received a political science certificate from the Moscow Social Science Institute.

== Personal information ==
Rahmat is married and has 13 children (one wife) 6 Sons and 7 daughters. His permanent residence is in Jalalabad, Nangarhar province.

== Working experience ==
Rahmat served as a teacher and school administrator both in Nangarhar and Kabul from 1969 until the mid 1980s. The communist regime tabbed him to be Deputy Governor of Nangarhar province in 1986, and he continued in that position until 1993. Rahmat was absent from his post, however, during 1987-89 in order to further his education in the Soviet Union. He resigned as Deputy Governor in 1992 due to his opposition to government policies. Following the fall of the communist regime, he worked in several positions within the Nangarhar chapter of De Sule Au Islami Warorwalai Jabha ("Islamic Brotherhood and Peace Organization") that strove unsuccessfully to reconcile the disparate resistance groups in post-jihad Afghanistan. In 1994 he began a career with KABUL international NGOs active in the country. He served as local supervisor for IRC programs in Nangarhar (1994–97), and as a field assistant for IOM in Farah Province (2000) before holding positions with UNAMA, including senior political assistant, from 2002 until his appointment as Governor of Paktia in November 2006.He speaks Dari, Pashto, and some English and Russian (comprehension appears adequate but limited speaking ability)

Preceded by Hakim Taniwal	Governor of Paktia Province, Afghanistan; 2006–	Succeeded by Incumbent
