= Shaikh Zayed University =

Public university in Khost, Afghanistan

Coordinates: 33.3489°N 69.8691°E

- د شیخ زاید پوهنتون
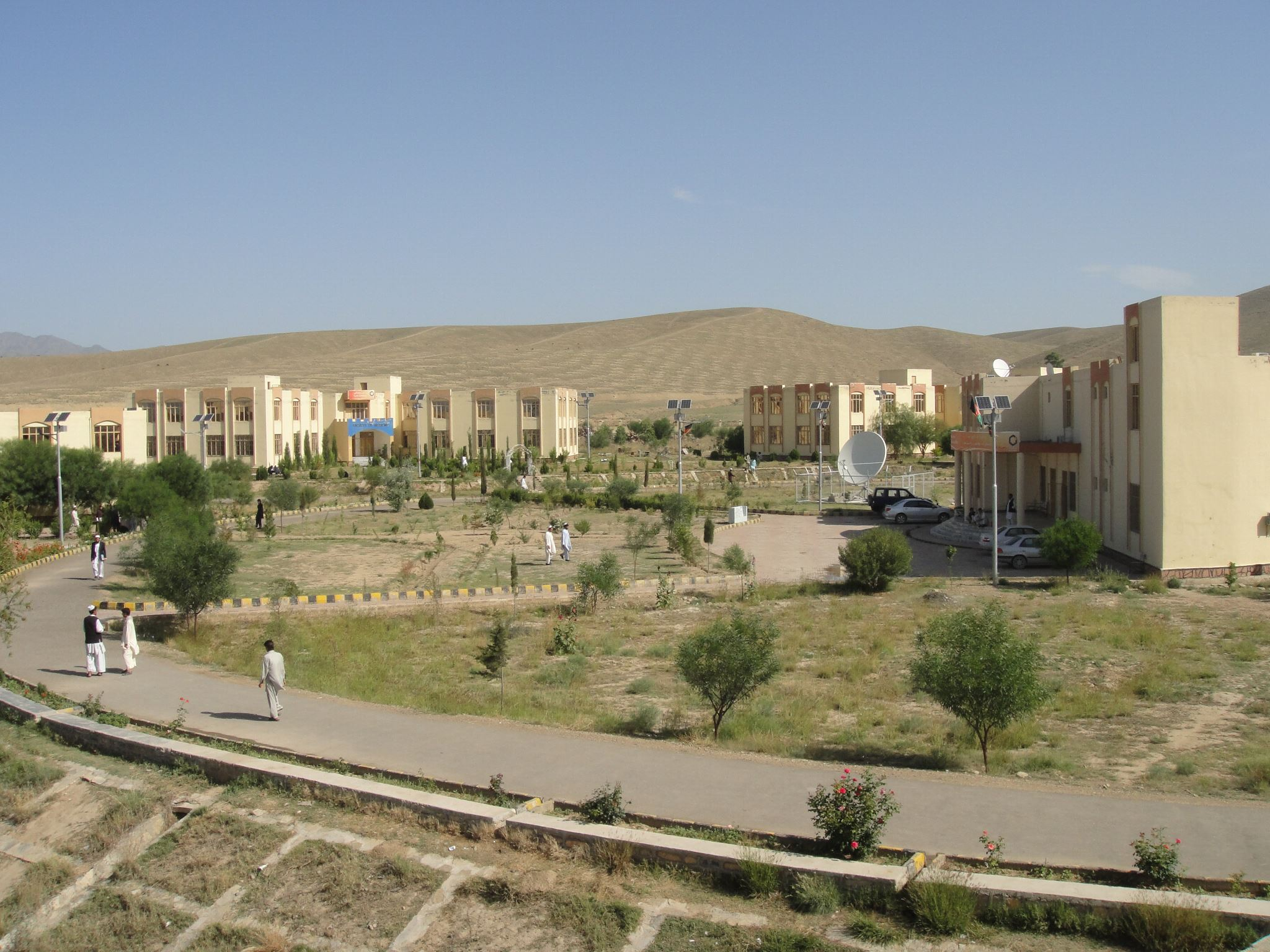
- View of SZU in 2012
- Other name: Khost University
- Former name: Afghan University Peshawar
- Type: Public
- Established: 2000
- Chancellor: Shaikh Mohammad Yaqoob Niazai
- Students: 30,000
- Location: Khost, Afghanistan
- Website: szu.edu.af/en

Shaikh Zayed University (SZU; Pashto: د شیخ زاید پوهنتون), also known as Khost University (Pashto: د خوست پوهنتون), is a public university in the city of Khost, southeastern Afghanistan. With its original name Afghan University Peshawar, it was initially established in 2000 in Peshawar. It was shifted to Khost by special orders of the former Afghan President Hamid Karzai, and was officially registered in 2003. The university was named after Shaikh Zayed bin Sultan Al Nahyan, the first President of the United Arab Emirates (UAE), who sponsored the construction of its campus in Khost.

Work on the university started when Governor Hakim Taniwal was in office. The next governor, Merajuddin Patan, made a trip to the UAE, and requested funds for the completion of the university. In order to honor UAE's help, the university was renamed Shaikh Zayed University. Governor Patan had a track record for opening schools, and supporting education for all genders, so it was only natural for him to push for the construction of SZU. The university's new campus was officially inaugurated in March 2008.

As of 2026, Shaikh Zayed University has expanded to include 12 faculties, including Computer Science, Medicine, Engineering, and Journalism. Recent data indicates the university serves over 8,000 students. In February 2025, several new development projects were inaugurated on campus to enhance technical and academic capacity. The university's teaching hospital also received a significant upgrade in late 2025 with the procurement of new medical supplies valued at 5.5 million Afghanis.

== Infrastructure ==
The library is available to all of the students. On campus the students can use the sports facilities provided by the university.

== Faculties ==
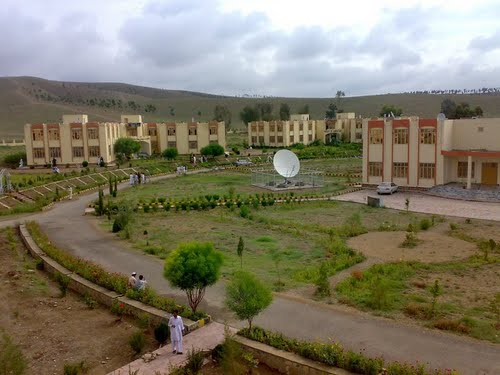
The university in 2010

SZU is a large university and graduates students from the following fields:

1. Computer science
2. Medicine
3. Engineering
4. Literature
5. Journalism
6. Sharia
7. Politics
8. Agriculture
9. Education
10. Economy and Management

== See also ==
- List of universities in Afghanistan
- Ministry of Higher Education
