= Raz Mohammed Dalili =

Afghan politician

Raz Mohammed Dalili (born 1959) was the former governor of Paktia Province in Afghanistan from 2002 until 2004. His arrival as governor in the capital Gardez was delayed when local militia leader and previous governor Pacha Khan Zadran refused to let him into the city. Dalili eventually successfully served for two years. He is an ethnic Pashtun.

== Role in the custodial death of Jamal Nasser ==
An 18-year-old Afghan militia soldier named Jamal Nasser, captured with seven other militiamen in March 2003, died in custody. Members of the Green Beret team who captured Nasser and his comrades were under investigation because it was alleged that they hid his death, colluded and falsified their reports. CBS News reported, on September 21, 2004, that former Paktia Governor Dalili confirmed that he had requested a Green Beret officer named "Mike" to apprehend militia soldiers who were conducting illegal roadblocks, on the Khost-Gardez highway, and extorting money from travelers. CBS News identified Dalili as the current Governor of Wardak Province.

Preceded by Taj Mohammad Wardak	governor of Paktia Province, Afghanistan; 2002–2004	Succeeded by Assadullah Wafa
Preceded by ?	governor of Wardak Province, Afghanistan; 2004–?	Succeeded by ?
