= Jan Baz Zadran =

Aide to Pashtun warlord Sirajuddin Haqqani

Jan Baz Zadran (sometimes Janbaz Zadran), also known as Jamil or Jalil Haqqani, was a top aide to Pashtun warlord Sirajuddin Haqqani. One of the most-wanted militant commanders in the AfPak theater of operations, Zadran was killed in a US drone strike in Pakistan on 13 October 2011.

== Militant activity ==
Zadran was considered a powerful leader in the Haqqani Network, the Islamist militant group that has been the largest killer of American soldiers in Afghanistan. He was a political deputy to Sirajuddin Haqqani, but unlike the rest of the Miranshah Shura, he was not a military commander and did not have experience fighting under the Network's supreme leader, Jalaluddin Haqqani.

Hailing from the Haqqanis' home village of Srani in the Garda Tseray district of Paktia, Zadran was said to be one of Sirajuddin's most trusted associates, and was often described as the third-ranking leader of the entire Haqqani Network. He was in charge of the group's finances as well as weapons and ammunition acquisition, a position that gave him "considerable authority in the movement."

== Death ==
On 13 October 2011, an American CIA drone fired two missiles into a compound and vehicle in Dandey Darpakhel village, about seven kilometers north of Miranshah, the main town in the North Waziristan tribal district of Pakistan. The missiles killed Zadran and three other militants, said to be fighters guarding their superior as he was in the compound. Following Zadran's death, a US official in Washington would call him "the most senior Haqqani leader in Pakistan to be taken off the battlefield".
