= Muhammad Ali Jan Ahmad =

Governor of Paktia province

Maulvi Muhammad Ali Jan Ahmad
- Pashto: مولوي محمد علي جان احمد

Governor of Paktia
- In office 7 November 2021 – September 2023
- Prime Minister: Hasan Akhund
- Emir: Hibatullah Akhundzada
- Preceded by: Mullah Haji Hamza
- Succeeded by: Muhrullah Hamad

Governor of Logar
- In office August 2021 – 6 November 2021
- Preceded by: Abdul Qayyum Rahimi
- Succeeded by: Haji Mali Khan

Maulvi Muhammad Ali Jan Ahmad (Pashto: مولوي محمد علي جان احمد) is an Afghan Taliban politician who is served as Governor of Paktia province from 7 November 2021 to September 2023. He has also served as Governor of Logar province from August 2021 to 6 November 2021.
