= Assassination attempts on Hamid Karzai =

Assassination attempts on the 12th President of Afghanistan

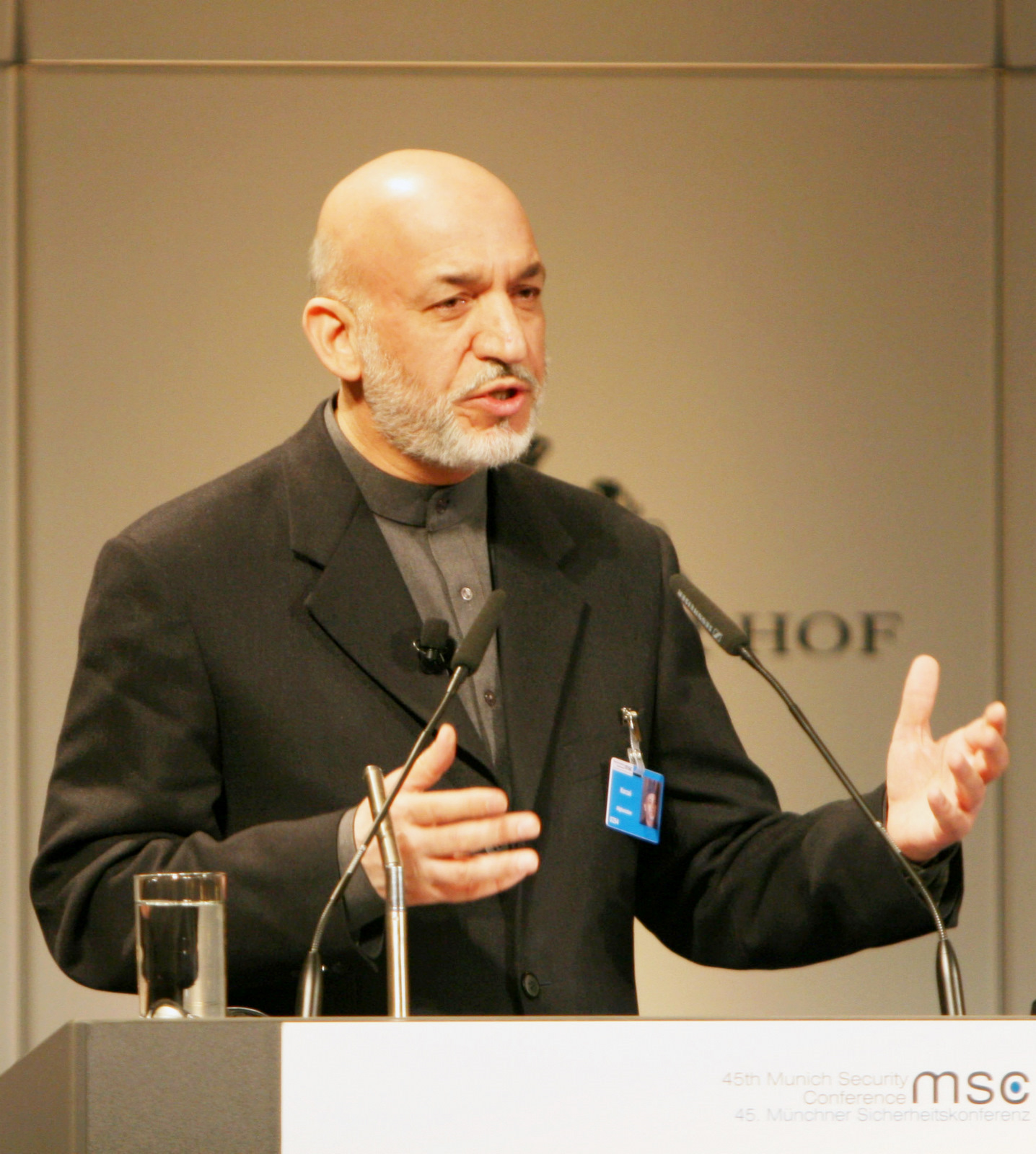
Hamid Karzai at the Munich Conference on Security Policy in 2009

Hamid Karzai, the 12th President of Afghanistan, was subject to several failed assassination attempts after becoming leader of Afghanistan on 20 December 2001.

== Assassination attempts and plots ==
=== September 2002 ===
On 5 September 2002, a young bystander leaned to say something to Hamid Karzai, who was sitting in the back of a Toyota Land Cruiser, and then all of a sudden U.S. Special Forces assigned to protect Karzai began shooting at the bystanders. Those killed in the shooting were two civilians and one security personnel of Gul Agha Sherzai. The Americans gave a different account, alleging that it was an assassination attempt on Karzai and that one of its members was wounded.

=== September 2004 ===
On 16 September 2004, a rocket missed the helicopter Karzai was flying in while en route to Gardez. The helicopter, an American Chinook, returned to Kabul. Government officials said the rocket hit almost a mile from the helicopter and questioned whether it was an assassination attempt. Some at the scene thought the explosion was celebratory. Three people were reported to have been arrested by the Afghan police in Gardez in connection with the attack, by Kabul Television.

=== June 2007 ===
The Taliban attempted to assassinate Karzai in Ghazni where Karzai was giving a speech to elders. The Taliban fired approximately 12 rockets, some of which landed 220 yards (200 m) away from the crowd. Karzai was not hurt in the incident and was transported away from the location after finishing his speech.

=== April 2008 ===
On 27 April 2008, insurgents, reportedly from the Haqqani network, used automatic weapons and rocket-propelled grenades to attack a military parade that Karzai was attending in Kabul. During the national anthem, three Taliban attackers opened fire. Live television coverage of the event was cut off shortly afterward. Karzai was unhurt, but at least three people were killed, including parliamentarian Fazel Rahman Samkanai, a ten-year-old girl, Nasir Ahmad Latifi, minority leader, and ten injured. Others attending the event included government ministers, former leaders, diplomats and the military top brass, all of whom had gathered to mark the 16th anniversary of the fall of the Afghan communist government to the mujahideen.

Responding to the attack during the ceremony, the United Nations said the attackers "have shown their utter disrespect for the history and people of Afghanistan." Taliban spokesman Zabiullah Mujahid claimed responsibility for the attack, stating, "We fired rockets at the scene of the celebration." He went on to say there were six Taliban at the scene and that three were killed. "Our aim was not to directly hit someone," Mujahed said when asked if the intention was to kill Karzai. "We just wanted to show to the world that we can attack anywhere we want to". The ability of the attackers to get so close to Karzai suggested they had inside help. Defense minister Wardak confirmed that a police captain was connected with the group behind the assassination attempt and that an army officer supplied the weapons and ammunition used in the attack.

=== October 2011 ===
As recently as October 2011, while Karzai was visiting India to sign an important strategic pact with Manmohan Singh, the National Directorate of Security (NDS) agents arrested six people in Kabul for allegedly planning to assassinate Karzai. Among those involved in the assassination plot were four Kabul University students and professor Dr. Aimal Habib, including one of Karzai's personal guards.

=== June 2013 ===
On June 25, 2013, eight Taliban fighters cleared two security clearances inside the Shash Darak district of Kabul, where the Afghan presidential palace is located and began their attack. They detonated multiple suicide bombs causing 14 different explosions at the palace's eastern gate, and engaging in an intense firefight with palace security guards. The attack took place near where reporters were setting up inside the palace gates for a press event where Karzai was scheduled to address the press. Karzai, who was inside the palace at the time, was not injured. The explosions and firefight resulted in the deaths of three Afghan security guards and all of the Taliban fighters.

== See also ==
- List of people who survived assassination attempts
