= Ziauddin (Afghan militia leader) =

Afghan militia leader

Ziauddin is an Afghan militia leader. He helped lead the ouster of the Taliban in 2002. Ziauddin was awarded command of some of the Afghan Transitional Authority's security forces in Paktia Province in 2002. He feuded with other pro-US militia leaders and eventually broke with the US.

Human Rights Watch reports that Ziauddin was once allied with the Taliban.

In Gardez, Human Rights Watch received credible information about one local commander, Ziauddin, extorting local businesses—demanding vehicles or large sums of money under threat of arrests or beatings.

== Military activities ==
In March 2002 Ziauddin and Abdullah Mujahid played a role in containing a large force of Taliban who were reported to have been hiding in a large cave complex.

In September 2002 Ziauddin was authorized to attack the forces of Pacha Khan Zadran, the leader of a rival militia, who was no longer recognizing the central government. On September 30, 2002 Ziauddin reported his troops, supported by heavy artillery, had taken Sayed Karam where Pack Khan Zadran had his headquarters.

Ziauddin went into hiding when his lifelong friend, colleague and fellow anti-Taliban leader, Abdullah Mujahid was denounced and sent to the Guantanamo Bay detention camps, in Cuba, in July 2003. Ziauddin and Mujahid are members of Afghanistan's Tajik ethnic group. Pacha Khan Zadran, their main rival, a fellow anti-Taliban leader who had been given a security appointment in Paktia, is a member of the majority group, the Pashtun.

Ziauddin was apprehended, and spent a year in the Bagram Theater detention facility. Staff Sergeant Clint Douglas, formerly stationed in Gardez, described Ziauddin as both an ally and a "thug". He claimed Ziauddin was responsible for rocket attacks on the American base in Gardez. Douglas described Ziauddin as a Pashtun. On January 16, 2010, the Department of Defense was forced to publish the names of the 645 captives held in the Bagram Theater Internment Facility, which included an individual named Ziauddin.
