= Mali Khan =

Afghan Governor of Logar province

Haji Mali Khan
- Pashto: حاجي مالي خان

Deputy Chief of Staff of the Armed Forces of Afghanistan
- Incumbent
- Assumed office 4 March 2022
- Chief of Staff of the Armed Forces: Qari Fasihuddin

Governor of Logar
- In office 7 November 2021 – 14 March 2022
- Prime Minister: Hasan Akhund
- Emir: Hibatullah Akhundzada
- Preceded by: Muhammad Ali Jan Ahmad
- Succeeded by: Maulvi Inayatullah

Haji Mali Khan (Pashto: حاجي مالي خان) is an Afghan Taliban politician, and former military commander. Khan has served as Deputy Chief of Staff of the Armed Forces since 4 March 2022. From 7 November 2021 to 14 March 2022, he served as governor of Logar Province. Prior to his governmental service, he was considered one of the leaders of the Haqqani network, a "semi-autonomous" offshoot of the Taliban.

== Life ==
Mali Khan is a Pashtun from the Zadran tribe. His sister is the mother of five of Jalaludin Haqqani's sons and hence Mali Khan is uncle to Sirajuddin Haqqani.

Mali Khan was a senior Haqqani commander in Afghanistan, in charge of troop movements and support between the North Waziristan District in Pakistan and the Loya Paktia (the Khost, Paktia, and Paktika provinces of Afghanistan). In the 2009–2010, Mali Khan established bases for Haqqani fighters in the Mangal tribal areas of Paktia Province. During this time he promoted the movement of Taliban forces from Pakistan to Afghanistan. Among his duties was acting as an emissary between Baitullah Mehsud and the Haqqanis. He was captured by ISAF forces on 27 September 2011, during a raid in Musakhel District, a Haqqani network stronghold in Khost Province. He was released in a prisoner swap in November 2019. Several months after his release he was reported back at work for the Haqqani network, in military coordination and logistics.

When the Islamic Emirate of Afghanistan was re-established, following the withdrawal of NATO troops in August 2021, Mali Khan became part of the Afghan government and was appointed as governor of Logar Province.
