= Forward Operating Base Gardez =

Coordinates: 33.6217°N 69.2383°E

Forward Operating Base Gardez in 2011

The Gardez Fire Base was an American outpost in Afghanistan, near the city of Gardez, in the province of Paktia, near the border with Pakistan. The base was approximately 100 kilometers south of Kabul, and was the subject of regular attack in 2003. In mid-August 2011, a truck packed with explosives detonated at the entrance, killing two Afghan guards but otherwise doing minimal damage to the base. The Taliban, however, made spurious claims of massive casualties and destroyed helicopters.

Colonel Burke Garrett published a letter in the Fort Drum Blizzard in which he described the living conditions at the Gardez Fire Base, and its neighboring bases:

The 1-87 Infantry and A Troop / 3-17 Cav are based out of Orgun-E and Gardez Fire Base respectively, but also located at several smaller bases in the eastern central part of the country, along the border with Pakistan. Living conditions are more austere there due to their remote locations, but they all receive mail, supplies of food and personal items regularly. Phone and e-mail connectivity varies by location, but we are working hard to improve our ability to contact families. They also have monthly helicopter visits from the AAFES staff based out of Bagram and Kandahar, so that they can still purchase items like CDs and magazines for their personal enjoyment.

FOB Gardez was closed in November 2014 by the 319th Movement Control Team from Dover, Delaware (Army Reserve). The FOB was run by the 101st Airborne Division, 1st/506 Infantry Easy Co. (Band of Brothers).

== Custodial death of Jamal Nasser ==
Jamal Nasser, an Afghan militia soldier in United States' custody, died at Gardez Fire Base on March 16, 2003.

Nasser, 18-year-old Afghan militia soldier was captured with seven other militiamen in March 2003. Members of the Green Beret team who captured Nasser and his comrades were under investigation because it was alleged that they hid his death, colluded and falsified their reports.

In 2004, eighteen months after his death, when Nasser's death in custody was brought to the attention of American headquarters, his death was attributed to a kidney infection.

CBS News reported, on September 21, 2004, that former Paktia Governor Raz Mohammed Dalili confirmed that he had requested a Green Beret officer named "Mike" to apprehend militia soldiers who were conducting illegal roadblocks, on the Khost-Gardez highway, and extorting money from travelers. CBS News identified Dalili as the current Governor of Wardak Province.

Later, an investigation determined that the account of death by natural causes was the result of collusion among the GIs in the Special Forces unit who had custody of Nasser when he died. After a two-year investigation, no one was held responsible for his death. Reprimands were filed in the dossiers of several GIs for the failure to report his death.

== See also ==
- Jamal Nasser
- Sayed Nabi Siddiqui
- Gardez Air Base
