= Hakim Taniwal =

Governor of Paktia Province, Afghanistan
- In office 2005 – 10 September 2006
- Preceded by: Assadullah Wafa
- Succeeded by: Rahmatullah Rahmat

Personal details
- Born: 3 March 1946 Hesarak, Tani, Khost
- Died: 10 September 2006 (aged 60) Gardez, Paktia Province, Afghanistan

Hakim Taniwal (Pashto: حکيم تڼيوال) was the governor of Paktia province in Afghanistan until he was killed by a suicide bomber on 10 September 2006, at the age of 60. Previously, had been a governor of the province of Khost, near the border with Pakistan, where al-Qaeda had established training camps during the time of the Taliban and later took refuge in the Tora Bora mountains.

Taniwal was an Afghan exile in Australia with his family before returning to Afghanistan to take the governorship. Lacking the military background, and the associated questionable human rights record, of so many of the country's past and present politicians, Taniwal was considered an effective and honest administrator before his death. He brought Shaikh Zayed University to Khost.

== See also ==
- List of Afghan Transitional Administration personnel
- List of Afghanistan Governors
- Tani, Afghanistan
