= Mohammad Hashim Zare =

Afghan politician

Governor of Samangan, Afghanistan
- Incumbent
- Assumed office 7 June 2015
- Preceded by: Khairullah Anush

Governor of Jowzjan
- In office 2007–2010
- Preceded by: Juma Khan Hamdard
- Succeeded by: Mohammed Aleem Sayee

Personal details
- Born: 1953 (age 72–73)

Mohammad Hashim Zare is the current governor of Samangan, Afghanistan. Before this he had been an adviser to President Hamid Karzai. He is an ethnic Uzbek.

Ferouza Quraishi, the deputy of the Provincial Council of Jowzjan, has accused Zare of wasting foreign aid. She called the governor "inefficient" and said aid from Turkmenistan had not reached those in need and had been wasted by the governor. According to Zare these accusations are "baseless".

== Notes ==
Preceded by Juma Khan Hamdard	Governor of Jowzjan Province, Afghanistan; 2008-2010	Succeeded by [Incumbent]
