= Jacob E. Schlereth =

American army soldier

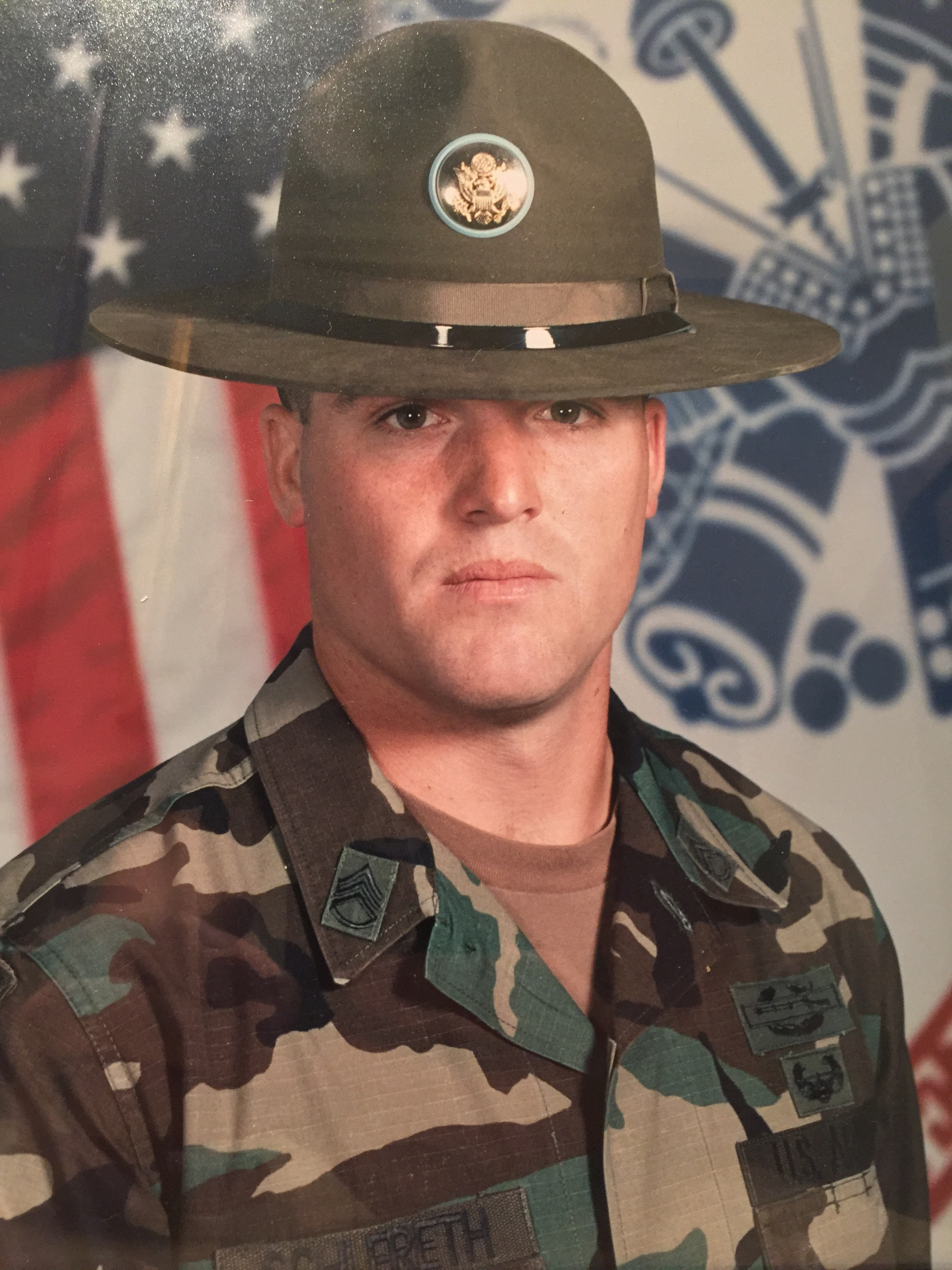
- Born: Jacob Edward Schlereth; December 1, 1980; Vassar, Michigan, U.S.
- Died: November 27, 2012 (aged 31); Columbus, Georgia, U.S.
- Military career
- Allegiance: United States
- Branch: United States Army
- Service years: 1999–2012
- Rank: Sergeant first class
- Nickname: "Jake"
- Unit: 101st Airborne Division
- Conflicts: Iraq War: Operation Iraqi Freedom I; War in Afghanistan
- Awards: Bronze Star Medal; Army Commendation Medal

Jacob Edward Schlereth (December 1, 1980 – November 27, 2012) was a United States Army soldier. He was in the infantry, cavalry, and was a drill sergeant.

Known his whole life as "Jake", Schlereth completed three tours of duty, one in Iraq and two in Afghanistan, and was serving as a reconnaissance instructor when he died suddenly at age 31 from an unexplained coronary anomaly.

== Career ==
Schlereth enlisted in the U.S. Army on April 22, 1999, reenlisting twice in 2004 and 2009. He found great pride in being a member of the Infantry and excelled in combat and leadership.

At the time of his death, the U.S. Army summarized his career as follows:

SFC Schlereth entered the Army in June of 1999 and attended one station unit training at Fort Benning, Georgia, graduating from Echo Company 2nd Bn 58th Infantry Regiment as Infantryman of the Cycle for Class 047-99.

Schlereth served as a M240B Machine Gunner, Assistant Gunner, Fire Team Leader, and Squad Leader in 1st Bn, 327th Infantry Regiment 1st Brigade Combat Team (Bastogne), 101st Division (AASLT) Fort Campbell, KY. Schlereth was a Drill Sergeant at Bravo Company 1st Bn, 19th Infantry Regiment at Fort Benning, GA for two and a half years completing 7 cycles. After “leaving the trail” SFC Schlereth held Dismounted Reconnaissance Team Leader and Platoon Sergeant Positions in the 1st Squadron, 61st Cavalry Regiment (RSTA) 4th Brigade Combat Team (Currahee), 101st Division (AASLT) Fort Campbell, KY. Finally, he served as an Instructor at the Army Reconnaissance Course at 3rd Squadron, 16th Cavalry Regiment 316th Brigade (Destroyers), Fort Benning, GA.

Schlereth’s deployments included: Operation Iraqi Freedom I with the 1st Bn, 327th Infantry Regiment from March 2003-February 2004. He had two deployments to Afghanistan with 1st Squadron, 61st Cavalry Regiment from March 2008-March 2009 and August 2010-August 2011.

Schlereth’s military education included all levels of NCOES up to and including the Maneuver Senior Leaders Course, the Army Reconnaissance Course, Army Basic Instructors Course, Master Driver Training Course, Transportation and Storage of Hazmat Material, the Airborne Course, the Air Assault Course, Combatives Level One and Two, the Hygiene and Sanitation Course, Combat Life Savers Course, and the Drill Sergeant Course.

—

== Awards and decorations ==
SFC Schlereth (right) receives his second Bronze Star Medal with Valor from Former U.S. Secretary of Defense Robert Gates (left) during his second deployment in Afghanistan

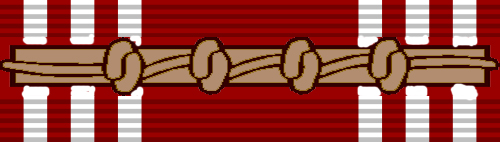

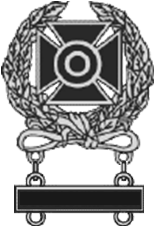

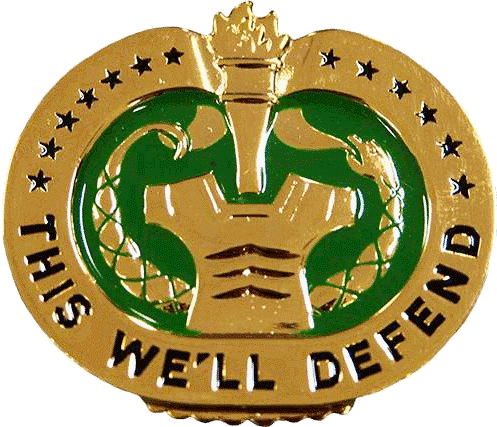

Badge	Combat Infantryman			
1st row	Bronze Star Medal with Valor and bronze oak leaf cluster			
2nd row	Meritorious Service Medal	Army Commendation Medal w/ three oak leaf clusters	Army Achievement Medal w/ five oak leaf clusters	
3rd row	Army Good Conduct Medal w/ 4 loops	National Defense Service Medal	Afghanistan Campaign Medal w/ 2 campaign stars	
4th row	Iraq Campaign Medal	Global War on Terrorism Service Medal	Army NCO Professional Development Ribbon	
5th row	Army Service Ribbon	Army Overseas Service Ribbon	NATO Medal w/ 2 service stars	
Badges	Basic Parachutist Badge	Air Assault Badge	Expert Marksmanship Badge for Rifle	Army Drill Instructor Badge

=== Bronze Star medals ===
During his military career, Schlereth received the Bronze Star Medal four times, twice with the Valor distinction to denote "participation in acts of heroism involving conflict with an armed enemy". His first award with valor included a narrative that exemplifies Schlereth's career in the U.S. Army:

Staff Sergeant Schlereth's courage, professionalism, loyalty, and dedication to duty serve as examples for his peers to emulate as he led the assault on numerous fixed enemy positions while under direct fire. His quick thinking and complete disregard for his own personal safety ensured the safe extraction of a wounded Soldier during an engagement with an enemy force. His tireless efforts and unwavering dedication to success reflect great credit upon himself, 101st Airborne Division (Assault), and the United States Army.

— DA FORM 638, APR 2006 – dated 20100501

Additionally, on the recommendation for this award, Schlereth's Squadron Commander wrote: "Highly recommended. SFC Schlereth's actions of heroism are in keeping with the highest traditions of military service, & go well beyond the call of duty." On the same recommendation, the Commanding General James D. Thurman wrote: "Well deserved by a heroic soldier!"

== Legacy ==
=== Appearance on 60 Minutes ===
During his second deployment, Schlereth served as Staff Sergeant at Firebase Wilderness and was part of a 2008 profile done by journalist Lara Logan for the CBS News television program 60 Minutes. For the segment, "Afghanistan: Fighting In A 'Hornet's Nest'", Logan spent nearly a month at a remote U.S. Army base interviewing some of that staff and following them on patrols across the rugged Afghan terrain, even experiencing gunfire and mortars from enemy attacks.

We're going to tell you about a small group of American soldiers on the frontlines of the war. 60 Minutes lived with them for a month last September on a small forward operating base in eastern Afghanistan, not far from the Pakistani border. It's where the real fight against the Taliban and al Qaeda is happening – in canyon valleys and jagged mountain hideouts which are crawling with enemy fighters. - Lara Logan

The entire video, renamed "Combat in Afghanistan", was published on YouTube by CBS News in 2010.

=== Likeness in military museum ===
Schlereth during the process of making a plaster cast of his head

In 2011, Schlereth was selected to take part in the "Faces of Valor" Project of the Fort Campbell Historical Society. Army soldiers who had been awarded the Bronze Star with Valor were chosen to have their likeness recreated in one of the many exhibits to be featured in the upcoming Wings of Liberty Museum. Casts were made of his hands and head and incorporated into a wax figure on display as one of seven tableau depicting the rich history of the 101st Airborne Division.

=== Memorial scholarship ===
Created by his family in 2014, the SFC Jacob E. Schlereth Memorial Endowed Scholarship at Auburn University is awarded annually to students enrolled in the Samuel Ginn College of Engineering and who are veterans of the U.S. military. Students must hold a minimum grade point average of 3.0 on a 4.0 scale.

== Personal life ==
Schlereth with his wife, Margaret, and son, Caleb, during a March 2011 return from Afghanistan

During his military career, Schlereth began dating Margaret Bentley, also of Vassar, Michigan. The two corresponded during his first deployment and Margaret moved to Clarksville, Tennessee to pursue their relationship while he was stationed at Fort Campbell, continuing during his second deployment. On April 14, 2007, they married and in May 2010 had a son. In 2011, Schlereth was transferred to Fort Benning in Columbus, Georgia and the young family relocated to the city of Auburn, Alabama where Margaret was hired as a Development Officer for Auburn University’s College of Engineering.

On Tuesday, November 27, 2012, Schlereth died unexpectedly from a sudden heart malfunction just before instructing a lesson on base at Fort Benning. Doctors were unable to accurately attribute the cause of death although he had no prior diagnosed problems, nor known hereditary conditions.
