= National Independence Party of Afghanistan =

National Independence Party of Afghanistan (Hezb-e Isteqlal-e Milli-ye Afghanistan, Dari: حزب استقلال ملی افغانستان) is a political party in Afghanistan, led by Taj Muhammad Wardak. In 2004, after being defeated in the presidential election in Afghanistan, they were part of the 12-member anti-Karzai coalition named the Jabha-ye Tafahom-e Melli-ye Afghanistan, or ‘National Understanding Front of Afghanistan‘, led by Yunus Qanuni.
