= Sayed Nabi Siddiqui =

Afghan torture victim

Sayed Nabi Siddiqui is an Afghan police officer who alleges that in August 2003 he was stripped naked by U.S.-led coalition forces, and beaten and photographed at a U.S. base in the city of Gardez in the Afghan province of Paktia. Siddiqui also alleged he was subjected to sexual abuse, taunting and sleep deprivation. On May 12, 2004, the U.S. military announced it had opened an investigation into the allegations.

Siddiqui was detained on July 15, 2003, after he reported police corruption and someone then accused him of being a member of the Taliban. He alleges he was held for about 40 days at three different U.S. bases: Gardez, Kandahar and Bagram.

Siddiqui's is one of 44 complaints submitted to the United Nations by Ahmed Zia Langari, a member of the Afghan Independent Human Rights Commission.

Siddiqui told the New York Times that in Kandahar, detainees were packed into wire cages and forced to use a bucket as a toilet in front of other detainees. He also said soldiers threw stones and bottles at detainees.

== See also ==
- Bagram torture and prisoner abuse
