= Taj Mohammad Wardak =

Afghan politician

Taj Mohammad Wardak is an Afghan politician from the National Independence Party of Afghanistan (Hezb-e Isteqlal Milli Afghanistan). An ethnic Pashtun, he spent some of the period of the Taliban's administration in the United States of America, and became an American citizen.

== Early political career ==
On 19 June 1965, Wardak was appointed as the Deputy Governor of Badakhshan Province. In the 1970s, he served as Governor of Badakhshan. After serving as President of the Inspection Department in the Ministry of Interior, Wardak was appointed as Governor of Laghman on 17 June 1972.

== Governor of Paktia ==
Wardak was appointed Governor of Paktia province in Afghanistan in the winter of 2002. He served for only a few months due to opposition from local warlord Pacha Khan Zadran.

== Minister of the Interior ==
According to Guantanamo captive Hafizullah Shabaz Khail, in testimony before his Combatant Status Review Tribunal Taj Mohammed [sic] Wardak was the first governor Hamid Karzai appointed for the Province of Paktia. Khail said he was appointed the District Chief of Zormat because the new governor, Wardak, trusted him. He said Wardak was replaced as governor by Raz Mohammed Dalili when Hamid Karzai asked him to assume a position in Kabul.

According to the BBC the "relatively unknown" Wardak was appointed Interior Minister on June 19, 2002.

According to Islam Online, Wardak's appointment raised controversy within the Ministry. They quote unnamed Ministry officials, and sentry Mohammad Halim:

"The interior ministry is on high alert because the people say why [Yunus] Qanooni Saheb has been transferred. He should come back, It is a state of high alert and strike. We do not like Wardak, because we do not know him and we want the return of Qanooni."

Wardak was one of several cabinet ministers Karzai appointed to a high level commission to investigate the assassination of Abdul Qadir, Vice President, and also one of Karzai's leading rivals. Qadir, like Wardak, was a Pashtun. Analysts said Karzai picked cabinet ministers from each of Afghanistan's ethnic groups, so each group would realize he was taking the investigation seriously. The commission included Vice President Mohammad Karim Khalili, Intelligence Services Director Mohammad Arif Sarwari, Rural Development Minister Mohammad Hanif Atma, and former Interim Irrigation Minister Hajji Mangal Hussain.

Wardak and Karzai differed in their interpretation of the deaths of students shot during a demonstration. Karzai called the first student known to have died a "martyr". Wardak said that student was shot by other students.

Wardak was replaced on January 28, 2003, by Ali Ahmad Jalali.

An article published on the web-site of The Jamestown Foundation on June 23, 2004 described Wardak as a "presidential aide".

== 2004 elections ==
Wardak was one of the running mates for presidential candidate Mohammad Yunos Qanuni.

== National Independence Party of Afghanistan ==
Taj Mohammad Wardak is listed as the head of the National Independence Party of Afghanistan on the Islamic Republic of Afghanistan Ministry of Justice web-page that lists the licensed political parties.

Preceded by Pacha Khan Zadran	Governor of Paktia Province, Afghanistan; 2004–2005	Succeeded by Raz Mohammed Dalili
Preceded by Yunis Qanooni	Afghan Interior Minister; 19 June 2002—January 28, 2003	Succeeded by Ali Ahmad Jalali
