= Ali Jalali =

Afghan politician, diplomat, and academic

Ali A. Jalali علی جلالی
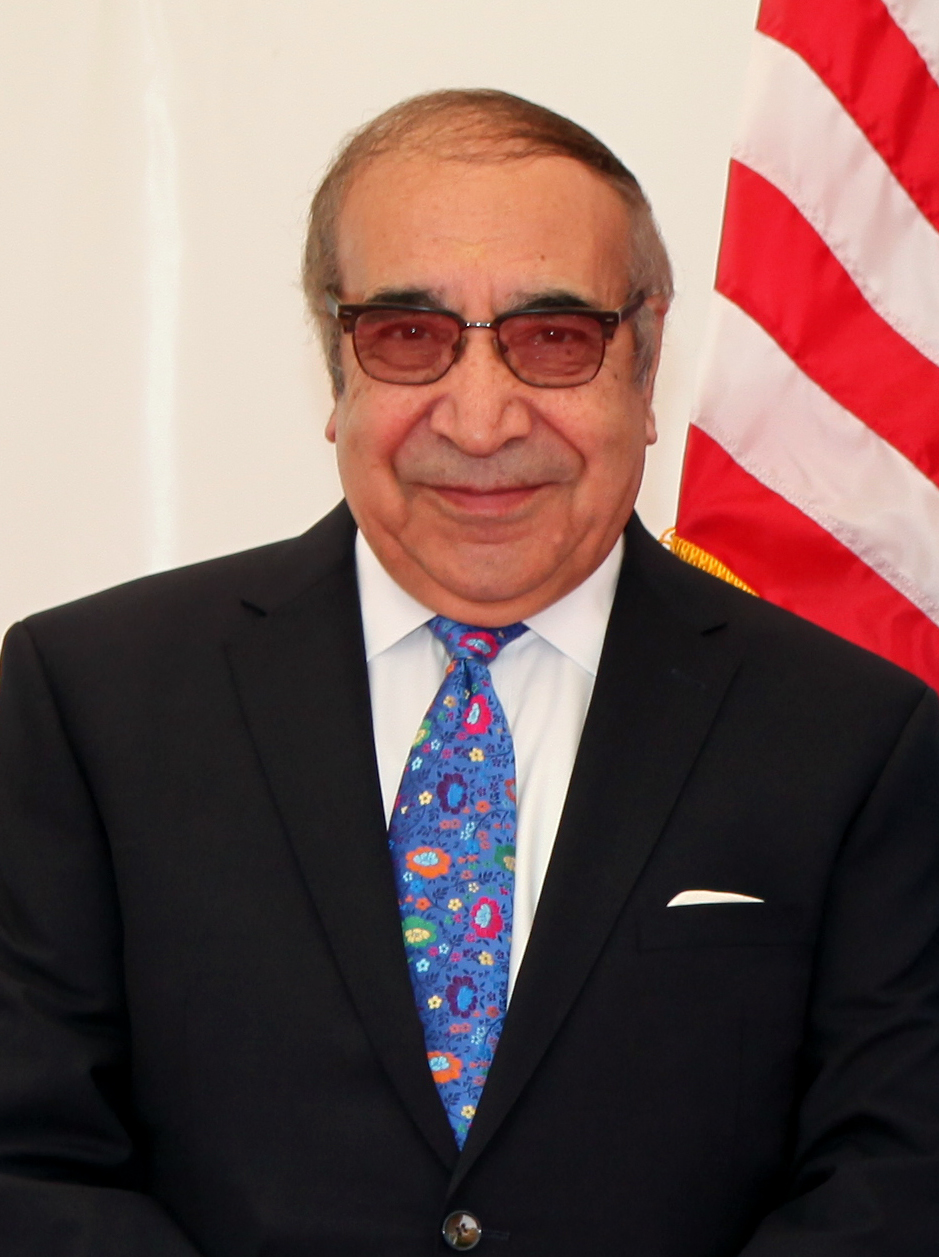

Minister of Interior
- In office 28 January 2003 – 27 September 2005
- President: Hamid Karzai
- Preceded by: Taj Mohammad Wardak
- Succeeded by: Zarar Ahmad Moqbel

Ambassador of Afghanistan to Germany
- In office 5 January 2017 – 31 October 2018
- President: Ashraf Ghani
- Preceded by: Abdul Rahman Ashraf
- Succeeded by: Abdul J. Ariyaee

Personal details
- Born: 1940 (age 85–86) Kabul, Kingdom of Afghanistan
- Spouse: Homaira Jalali
- Children: 2

Military service
- Allegiance: Islamic Republic of Afghanistan
- Branch/service: Afghan National Army
- Rank: Colonel
- Battles/wars: Soviet–Afghan War

Ali Ahmad Jalali (Pashto/Dari: علی احمد جلالی) is an Afghan politician, diplomat, and academic. Jalali served as the Minister of Interior from January 2003 to September 2005. He has also been a distinguished professor at the Near East South Asia Center for Strategic Studies (NESA) at the National Defense University in Washington, D.C. In August 2021, amid the collapse of the US-backed Afghan government, Jalali was rumored to become the leader of the Taliban-controlled interim Afghan government, which he has denied on Twitter as "fake news."

== Early life and education ==
Jalali was born in Kabul, Afghanistan in 1940, the son of the late Professor G. Jelani Jalali. He has been involved in politics and media for most of his life. He previously served with the Voice of America for over 20 years covering Afghanistan, South and Central Asia, and the Middle East, including assignments as Director of the Afghan Radio Network Project and chief of the Dari and Pashto services.

== Career ==
=== Military and politics ===
Jalali is a former colonel in the Afghan National Army and was a top military planner with the Afghan resistance following the Soviet invasion of Afghanistan. He attended higher command and staff colleges in Afghanistan, the United States, United Kingdom, and Russia, and has lectured widely.

As Interior Minister of post-Taliban Afghanistan, he created a trained force of 50,000 Afghan National Police (ANP) and 12,000 Border Police to work effectively in counter-narcotics, counter-terrorism, and criminal investigation to fight against organized crime and illegal border crossings. He successfully led the country-wide operations to protect the constitutional grand assembly (Loya Jirga) in 2003, the nationwide voters’ registration drive and landmark 2004 Presidential election, and the parliamentary elections in 2005.

Prior to assuming the ministerial post in Kabul, Jalali served in executive broadcast positions at Voice of America in Washington, D.C. from 1982 to 2003. During this period he, directed broadcasts in Pashto, Dari, Persian languages to Afghanistan, Iran and Central Asia. As a journalist, he covered the war in Afghanistan from 1982 to 1993 and the former Soviet Central Asia from 1993 to 2000 and traveled extensively across the region.

During his military service in Afghanistan army (1961–81), Jalali served in command, staff and educational posts with a final rank of colonel. He attended higher educational institutions in Afghanistan, United States, United Kingdom and Russia.

A U.S. citizen since 1987, Jalali left his job as a broadcaster for VOA to become the Interior Minister of Afghanistan. Jalali replaced Taj Mohammad Wardak in January 2003.

In January 2009 an article by Ahmad Majidyar of the American Enterprise Institute included Jalali on a list of fifteen possible candidates in the 2009 Afghan Presidential election. However, according to Chapter Three, Article Sixty Two of Afghanistan Constitution an Afghan citizen shall be the president of Afghanistan. Since Afghanistan has not signed any dual citizenship accords, it would have been necessary for him to renounce his U.S. citizenship and gain Afghan citizenship before seeking the office. Jalali did not complete these steps, and was not listed on the ballot in August 2009.

=== Author ===
A reputed multi-lingual military and political analyst, Jalali has extensive academic, managerial, journalistic and writing experience. A published writer in three languages (English, Pashto, Dari), Jalali is the author of numerous books and articles on political, military and security issues in Afghanistan, Iran and Central Asia including topics related to Islamic movements in the region. His works are published in the United States, Great Britain, Afghanistan, Pakistan, and Iran.

He has written extensively about the military of Afghanistan for scholarly journals and the mass media, in addition to reporting on Afghanistan and Central Asia for VOA for almost two decades.

Jalali is the author of several books, including a three-volume military history of Afghanistan. His most recent book, The Other Side of the Mountain (2002), co-authored with Lester Grau, is an analytical review of the Mujahedin war with the Soviet forces in Afghanistan from 1979 to 1989.

Jalali wrote an influential critique in the spring of 2002 of the U.S. military role in Afghanistan, arguing that the way the United States used local chieftains in the war on terrorism "enhanced the power of the warlords and encouraged them to defy the central authorities." He later softened his criticism but pointed out that local militias still play a significant role in working with the U.S. military.

He is a frequent commentator on Afghan and regional security and developmental at U.S. major TV networks (including CNN, ABC, NBC, MSNBC, FOX News, PBS, NPR) as well as Australian National TV (ABC) and Canadian CBC.

Jalali's articles and comments are also published in The New York Times, The Washington Post, Christian Science Monitor and many other major U.S. and European papers. Many of his scholarly articles are published by the Parameters, the senior professional journal of the U.S. Army, from 2001 to 2010.

=== Teaching ===
Jalali has taught at higher education institutions of Afghanistan and the United States and extensively lectured at U.S. Army War College, U.S. Naval Postgraduate School, Monterey, California, the Command and General Staff College, Fort Leavenworth, Kansas, and the British Army Staff College, Camberley, England.

== Personal life ==
Jalali is married to Homaira Jalali and the couple has a son and daughter.

== Awards ==
- Afghanistan High State Medal “Wazir Akbar Khan” 2005
- Afghanistan Distinguished Service Medal, Constitutional Loya Jirga 2004,
- Afghan Army Decoration Baryal 1-Gold 1968,
- Afghan Army Decoration Baryal 2-Silver 1964,
- Afghan Army Decoration Baryal 3-Bronze 1961,
- Afghan Army Wartia (Meritorious Service) Medal- Bronze 1967,
- Afghan Army Wartia (Meritorious Service) Medal- Silver 1977,
- U.S. Government Career Achievement Award 2003
- U.S. Federal Service 15, 20, and 25-year pins 1997, 2003 and 2011,
- Four VOA Sustained Superior Performance awards 1984–1990,
- Eleven VOA Excellence in Programming awards 1985–1992,

== Publications ==
=== Books and book chapters ===
- A Military History of Afghanistan from the Great Game to the Global War on Terror University Press of Kansas, March 2017,
- Afghanistan National Defense and Security Forces in Transition, USIP, Washington DC, May 2016,
- Trans-national Crime and the challenge for regional cooperation – a book Chapter in “the Non-Traditional Security Challenges in Asia,” Routledge India, June 2015. The book is a collection of essays that explore how non-traditional issues can manifest as security challenges, and the role of the state and military in dealing with these,
- Irregular Warfare of Pashtun Tribes in Fighting the Mughal Empire in 16th and 17th centuries, Kabul, February 2012,
- Monograph: Afghanistan - Challenges of the Transition to Peace, Emirate Center for Strategic Studies and research(ECSSR), Abu Dhabi, December 2012,
- The Challenge of Security Transition in Afghanistan – Book Chapter, Singapore National University, July 2012
- The Other Side of the Mountain, co-authored with Lester Grau, U.S. Marine Corps 1998, Barnes and Nobles 2001, Cass Publishers 2002. Several other publishers. It is an analytical review of Mujahedin war with the Soviet forces in Afghanistan from 1979 to 1989, 2002, 2011,
- The Future of Security Forces in Afghanistan. Book chapter in “The Future of Afghanistan,” United States Institute of Peace (USIP). January 2009,
- The Challenge of Regaining Momentum in Afghanistan. A book chapter in “Asian Security” by the Institute of Defense and Strategic Analysis (IDSA), New Delhi, India, February 2009,
- Countering Narcotics in Afghanistan. ”A book chapter in the Institute of National Strategic Studies (INSS) “Global Security Assessment,” National Defense University. October 2008,
- Afghanistan: The Challenge of State Building. A book chapter in "Afghanistan: transition Under Threat,” Geoffrey Hayes, editor, and Mark Sedra, editor, Wilfrid Laurier University Press, August 2008,
- Afghanistan: The legacy of War and the Challenge of Peace Building.2006. A book chapter in "Building a New Afghanistan,” by Robert I. Rotberg ed. edited by Brookings Institution Press and the World Peace Foundation, 2006,
- Selected Literary Works of Ustad G. Jilani Jalali, Introduction and Ed. Kabul, 2005,
- The Voroshilov Lectures, translated from lecture notes from the Soviet General Staff Academy and co-edited in three volumes, NDU Press, 1989, 1990, 1992,
- A Historical Perspective on Iran-Afghan Relation, a chapter in the book titled "Iran and Eurasia" edited by Ali Mohammadi, Ithaca Press, London, 2000
- The Theory of Combat, Institute of Military Conflict, 1989, Participated as member of the Institute in authoring a theoretical understanding of the nature of the combat process as a basis for model and simulation development,
- The Life and Times of the Afghan Classic Warrior Khushal Khan, in Pashto, Kabul, 1978,
- Studies in Afghanistan History from a Military Perspective, two volumes, MOD Press, Kabul, 1967. A detailed study of political and strategic trends in Afghanistan's military history (1100 pages)
- War and Diplomacy, a 12 chapter book on the use of military power in international relations (450 pages). It was based on lectures I offered as professor at the Institute of Diplomacy (War College), Ministry of Foreign Affairs, Kabul, 1974–1978,
- "Military strategy in Limited Wars", in Dari, Kabul, 1971,
- Textbook on Small Units Tactics (platoon, company), in Dari, Kabul, 1968,
- Textbook on larger Units Tactics (Battalion, Regiment, Division), in Dari, Kabul, 1976,
- Pages of Afghan History: A collection of 150 radio programs for Radio Afghanistan, Kabul, 1969–1975,
- Army Training programs for Infantry and Tank units (CPX, Field Exercise and Wargames), Kabul, 1972,

=== Most recent published articles ===
- Afghanistan's bubble of Optimism bursts, The Hill, Congress Blog, and November 18, 2015,
- "Renewing Afghanistan’s Social Contract", IPI Global Observatory, December 8, 2015,
- "Forging Afghanistan National Unity Government", a Peace Brief Paper at USIP (December 2014) on discussing the Challenges facing the Afghanistan National Unity Government,
- The Security Sector reform in Afghanistan-Achievements and Setbacks, published by the Journal of International Peace Operations (JIPO), March 2012,
- Non-State Armed Groups-Challenges and Opportunities, published by the Special Issue of the International Red Cross Journal, Geneva, Summer 2011,
- Commentary on the Kandahar Jail break (Pervasive Corruption and Public Distrust), published in New York Times' opinion page on April 26, 2010.
- "Afghanistan in Transition," published in the autumn 2010 issue of Parameters which is available on line.
- Commentary on U.S. Strategy Review for Afghanistan in New York Times’ opinion page on December 16, 2010.
- What to expect from General Petraeus, New York Times, June 24, 2010
- Afghanistan: Long-term Solutions and Perilous Shortcuts, Prism Quarterly (NDU), published in September 2010 Issue
- Is Fair Election in Afghanistan Possible, New York Times, October 21, 2009
- Is it Time to Negotiate with the Taliban, New York Times, Sep 1, 2009
- Afghanistan: A Long Hot Summer and A Call for Change, Far Eastern Economic Review, July/August 2009 issue
- Winning in Afghanistan, Parameters, Spring 2009 issue, Carlisle Barracks, Penn, US, May 2009
- How to Win in Afghanistan, OP-ED, The Washington Times, March 1, 2009
- Afghanistan: Regaining Momentum, Parameters, winter 2007-2008 issue, Carlisle Barracks, Penn, US, Jan 2008
- Expeditionary Forces: Superior Technology Defeated - The Battle of Maiwand. 2006. Coauthored with Lester W. Grau. A book chapter in "The British Army 1815-1914,) Harold E. Raugh Jr. Ed. Ashgate Publishing Limited, England, US. 2006
- Combating Opium in Afghanistan. 2006. Coauthored with Robert B. Oakley and Zoe Hunter. Strategic Forum No. 224, Institute for National Strategic Studies, National Defense University, November 2006, Washington D.C.
- Forbidden Cross-Border Vendetta: Spetsnaz Strike into Pakistan during the Soviet-Afghan, Journal of Slavic Military Studies, December 2006
- Five Years later Afghanistan Pays for Sins of Omission. Baltimore Sun, October 8, 2006. It was also published by several other major papers across the country and the Khalij Times. The article reviewed the past five years and made suggestions on ways to improve the security situation in Afghanistan.
- Nation Building on the Cheap. 2006. The Washington Post, May 28, 2006
- The Future of Afghanistan, Parameters, Spring 2006 issue, Carlisle Barracks, Penn, US, Feb 2006
- Afghanistan in 2002: The Struggle to Win Peace, Asian Survey, University of Berkeley, Ca. January 2003
- Demobilizing War machines: Making Peace last, a paper presented at and published by the U.N. conference on Rebuilding Societies Emerging from Conflict (September 9–11, 2002)
- Rebuilding Afghanistan’s National Army, Parameters, US. Army War College, Autumn, 2002
- Afghanistan: Political Participation and Security, Georgetown University, Center for Muslim-Christian Understanding, Summer 2002
- Russian-Iranian Strategic Partnership, Parameters, US. Army War College, Winter 2001
- A detailed Military Analysis of the Battle of Maiwand (Pashto), Afghan Cultural Association, Peshawar, 2000
- Expeditionary Forces: Superior Technology Defeated - The Battle of Maiwand,” U.S. Military Review, May–June 2001
- Afghanistan: the Anatomy of an Ongoing Conflict, Parameters, US. Army War College, spring 2001
- The Campaign for the caves : the battles of Zhawar in the soviet-Afghan war - la guerre des grottes : la bataille de Zhawar pendant la guerre soviétique en Afghanistan, Journal of Slavic military studies (the), 2001, vol. 14 n°3, p. 69-92 Vértitable guerilla, la bataille de Zhawar a montré les insuffisances de tactique des deux armées.
- Iran-Central Asia: Reminiscing the Past and Looking to the Future, Central Asia Monitor, No. 4, 2001
- Islam as a Political Force in Central Asia: The Iranian Influence, Central Asia Monitor, No. 2, 1999
- Kashmir: Flashpoint or Safety Valve? By Mr. Lester W. Grau Foreign Military Studies Office, Fort Leavenworth, KS. And Mr. Ali A. Jalali. This article was previously published in Military Review July–August 1999.
- Night Stalkers and Mean Streets: Afghan Urban Guerrillas, by Mr. Ali A. Jalali and Mr. Lester W. Grau, Foreign Military Studies Office, Fort Leavenworth, KS. This article was previously published in Infantry January–April 1999.
- Wither the Taliban? Taliban–A Model for “Islamicising” Central Asia? The Cyber-Caravan, Johns Hopkins University, vol. 1, No. 4, March 6, 1999
- Underground Combat: Stereophonic Blasting, Tunnel Rats and the Soviet-Afghan War - Lester Grau and Ali Ahmad Jalali. Engineer article November 1998
- The Break-up of State Structures in Afghanistan, in Persian, Mehragan (Iranian Journal), Summer 1998
- The Clash of Values and Interests in Afghanistan, Institute of World Politics, Washington D.C. 1995
- Identity Issues in Central Asia (1994), Institute of World Politics, Washington D.C. 1994
- Russia's Military Establishment in Transition, Institute of World Politics, Washington D.C. 1993
- Strategic and Operational Aspects of the Soviet Invasion of Afghanistan, International Conference on Light Infantry, Seattle, 1985
- U.S.-Kazakhstan Strategic Partnership: An hour-long documentary published and broadcast by VOA in several languages, 1994
- Civil-Military Relations in a Democracy: An hour-long documentary published and broadcast by VOA in several languages, 1995
- Intellectual Property Rights: A seven-part series of reports published and broadcast by VOA in several languages, 1995
- Poppies Along the Silk Road: An hour-long documentary published and broadcast by VOA in several languages, 1995
- Afghanistan- The War of the Neighbors: An hour-long documentary published by VOA and broadcast in several languages, 1996More than 400 reports and news analyses in English on Iran, Afghanistan and Central Asia published and broadcast by the Voice of America
- Over 450 of analytical reports (English) for VOA on political, economic and social developments in Central Asia and the Caucasus, 1993-2001
- Hundreds of Dari/Pashto articles and features were published in Afghanistan (mostly in the Military Journal) or broadcast on Radio Afghanistan between 1965 and 1978

=== Papers and reports ===
- More than 100 scholarly and policy papers and speeches presented at seminars, conferences and symposium in the United States, Europe, India, Pakistan and Japan, 1995–present

Political offices
Preceded by Taj Mohammad Wardak	Interior Minister of Afghanistan; January 28, 2003 - September 27, 2005	Succeeded by Zarar Ahmad Moqbel
