= Assadullah Wafa =

Afghan governor

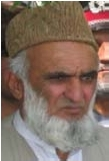
Assadullah Wafa

Assadullah Wafa (Pashto: اسدالله وفا) (born in Kandahar) is the former governor of the Afghan province of Helmand, and formerly governor of Kunar Province of Afghanistan and a previous governor of the Paktia Province where he was succeeded by Hakim Taniwal. His first name is sometimes spelled "Asadullah". He was born in Kandahar, Afghanistan.

Assadullah is best known for his time as governor of Paktia when he led a group of tribal elders to work with the United States government to establish an amnesty program for Taliban fighters in an attempt to bring an end to the fighting by separating the rank-and-file troops from their leadership. It is unclear whether this specific program ever went ahead, but he was subsequently transferred to Kunar to continue his work by negotiating with the local Hezbi Islami group.

He was also governor of Kunar during the June 29, 2005 shooting down of a Chinook helicopter in the Kunar province, which at that point had been the largest single day death-toll (16) by American troops in the region. He subsequently reported that the United States launched a retaliation strike against a Taliban base in the area, killing 18 women and children.

Preceded by Raz Mohammed Dalili	Governor of Paktia Province, Afghanistan; 2004–2005	Succeeded by Hakim Taniwal
Preceded by Said Fazal Akbar	Governor of Kunar Province, Afghanistan; 2005–2006	Succeeded by Hajji Mohammad Didar
Preceded by Mohammad Daoud	Governor of Helmand Province, Afghanistan; 2006–2008	Succeeded by Mohammad Golab Mangal
