= List of governors of Juzjan =

This is a list of the governors of the province of Juzjan, Afghanistan.

== Governors of Jowzjan Province ==
Governor	Period
Sayed Muhammad Hasan Hashimee	2002-2004
Roz Mohammad Nur	~2004-2006
Juma Khan Hamdard	2006-2007
Mohammad Hashim Zare	2007-2010
Mohammed Aleem Sayee	9 May 2010 - July 2013
Alhaj Baymorad Qoyunly	July 2013 – August 2021
Muhammad Ismail Rasikh	August 2021 – 7 November 2021
Shoaib Risalat	7 November 2021 – October 2022
Gul Haydar Shafiq	October 2022 - July 2026
Ismail Rasikh	July 2026 - present

== See also ==
- List of Afghanistan governors
