= Jamal Nasser =

Afghan soldier

Jamal Nasser (c. 1985 – March 16, 2003) was an Afghan soldier who died on March 16, 2003 in United States' custody at a Gardez Fire Base, an American outpost in Afghanistan.

In 2004, eighteen months after his death, when Nasser's death in custody was brought to the attention of American headquarters, his death was attributed to a kidney infection. Later, an investigation determined that the account of death by natural causes was a fiction, the result of collusion among the GIs in the Special Forces unit who had custody of Nasser when he died. After a two-year investigation, no one was held responsible for his death. Reprimands were filed in the dossiers of several GIs for the failure to report his death.

== Senator Patrick Leahy's account ==
According to Senator Patrick Leahy:

A recent report by the Crimes of War Project uncovered an Afghan detainee’s death that was never reported up the military chain of command. The detainee, Jamal Naseer, died in March 2003, allegedly after weeks of torture by American soldiers. Because the Special Forces unit that reportedly controlled the detention facility failed to report the death, it was never investigated. This incident is very troubling on its own, but, like so many other incidents we have discovered, it points to a much larger problem. The U.S. Army Criminal Investigation Command received a tip about Nasser's death earlier this year, but could not investigate the matter due to a lack of information. Christopher Coffey, an Army detective based at Bagram air base, told the L.A. Times:

"We're trying to figure out who was running the base. We don't know what unit was there. There are no records. The reporting system is broke [sic] across the board. Units are transferred in and out. There are no SOPs [standard operating procedures] … and each unit acts differently."

== Neimann Foundation for Journalism account ==
Craig Pyes, one of the two LA Times reporters who broke the story, described the process of researching the story for the Neiman Report, the publication of the Neiman Foundation for Journalism. Pyes wrote that he and his colleague, Kevin Sack, decided to conduct a parallel investigation to the Army's official investigation. He wrote they interviewed more than 1,000 individuals.

- They found that Jamal Nasser was in the custody of a unit known as ODA 2021, at an American firebase in Gardez.
- Nasser was captured with seven other Afghan soldiers, who described being beaten for seventeen days.
- Nasser's brother, a member of the eight-member Afghan squad, had one of his toenails pried off by his American interrogators.
- The Afghans had their clothes doused with glacial meltwater, and were left outside all night in freezing cold weather.
