= Pacha Khan Zadran =

Militia leader and politician

Pacha Khan Zadran (Pashto: پاچا خان ځدراڼ) is a militia leader and a politician in the southeast of Afghanistan. He was a former anti-Soviet fighter and militia leader who played a role in driving the Taliban from Paktia Province in the 2001 invasion, with American backing. He subsequently assumed the governorship of the province. In 2002, he engaged in a violent conflict with rival tribal leaders in the province over the governorship of the province, shelling Gardez City and obstructing two separate appointed governors sent by Hamid Karzai.

== Siege of Gardez and Khost ==
Angered that his assistance to American forces in Operation Anaconda had not been rewarded, Zadran's force became a "renegade" force. After being replaced by Taj Mohammad Wardak as governor of Paktia Province, Zadran retaliated in late April 2002 by bombarding the city of Gardez, the provincial capital, killing 36 civilians. In September 2002, with Zadran claiming governorship of the neighboring Khost Province, his forces laid an unsuccessful siege to the city of Khost.

== Son killed by Americans ==
On 24 March 2003, Carlotta Gall, writing in The New York Times, reported that a Zadran spokesman claimed US special forces had killed Pacha Khan's eldest son, and nine of his men.

== Arrested in Pakistan ==
Zadran was arrested by Pakistani security forces in November 2003. On February 3, 2004 he and his brother Amanullah were brought to the border of Afghanistan and handed over to Afghan troops. They were then driven to Jalalabad Airport, and a helicopter took them to Kabul.

== Elected to Afghanistan's legislature ==
In 2005, he was elected to the Afghanistan's legislature, the Wolesi Jirga. According to the International Institute for Strategic Studies:

"The disarmament commission reports that Pacha Khan Zadran, a commander in southeastern Paktia province who had surrendered weapons in order to be allowed to stand as a candidate for the lower house, has not handed over all his weapons."

== Guantanamo connection ==
Four Guantanamo detainees Khan Zaman, his son Gul Zaman, his brother Abib Sarajuddin, and his neighbor Mohammad Gul, were all captured on the night of January 21, 2002, early during the administration of Hamid Karzai. Sarajuddin had been anonymously denounced to American intelligence officials, who believed a claim that Sarajuddin had been the overnight host to a senior Taliban militant, Jalaluddin Haqqani, as he fled the Northern Alliance. American military intelligence had authorized a retaliatory attack on Sarajuddin, destroying his house, and killing his wife and half a dozen family members. The other three men were captured because they owned passports, or were related to Sarajuddin.

Sarajuddin's connection to Pacha Khan was that tribal elders had directed him to recruit fighters from his village, and four neighboring villages, to fight under Zadran, when the USA appealed to local leaders to overthrow the Taliban.

The four men's capture occurred when Zadran was considered a firm US ally. But, two and a half years later, when Zadran was considered a renegade, Sarajuddin's efforts to raise troops to serve under Pacha Khan Zadran, to overthrow the Taliban, was offered as a justification for classifying the four men as enemy combatants.

== Reports of banditry ==
Human Rights Watch, in a 2003 report entitled: "Killing you is a very easy thing for us", quoted truck drivers who reported being robbed at roadblocks set up by Pacha Khan Zadran's men:

"I'll tell you: The checkpoint on the way to Khost took 200 Pakistani rupees [U.S.$2.50] from me. This was the checkpoint that belongs to Padsha Khan Zadran.

"Once I refused to pay, and they put a gun on me, and they took the money by force. You cannot say no to them."

Pakistani forces captured Pacha Khan Zadran in Pakistan's Tribal Areas on December 1, 2003. He was handed over to Afghanistan's officials at the Pakistan-Afghanistan border on February 3, 2004 in Nangarhar. Officials said the capture occurred with their cooperation because his forces had been setting up roadblocks on the roads in Paktia, and robbing travelers.

The Seattle Times reports that American Special Forces referred to Pacha Khan Zadran as "PKZ". They report that in 2002 and 2003 the American Green Berets regarded PKZ as their main nemesis because they had been caught in the crossfire between Zadran and his local rivals.

The Seattle Times also reports that American Special Forces believed Pacha Khan was extorting payments from drivers on the Khost-Gardez highway.

== September 2007 meeting with Dan McNeil, NATO commander ==
NATO commander American General Dan McNeill inadvertently triggered hostilities when he met with Zadran in early September 2007. McNeill's intent was to get Zadran's men to stop setting up roadblocks. Their unauthorized roadblocks were interfering with the activities of US troops. But Zadran's rivals thought McNeill had come to personally arrest Zadran, and chose that moment to launch an impromptu sneak attack. Over fifty people were reported to have been killed.

== Assassination attempts ==
Pacha Khan Zadran has been reported to have been the subject of several assassination attempts.

| February 24, 2006 | A bomb placed on Pacha Khan Zadran's route failed to explode. |
| December 22, 2006 | An attack against Pacha Khan Zadran's vehicle, attributed to the Taliban.; The attack was also attributed to one of Pacha Khan Zadran's regional rivals, renegade militia leader Maulvi Siraj-ud-Din Haqqani.; Pacha Khan Zadran's son, grandson and bodyguard were passengers in the vehicle, and were injured, as were five bystanders. One injured individual subsequently died. |
| October 13, 2007 | A suicide bomber is reported to have rammed his motorcycle into Pacha Khan Zadran's car, killing six. |

== Namesakes ==
On January 16, 2010, the Department of Defense was forced to publish the names of the 645 captives held in the Bagram Theater Internment Facility. One of the individuals on the list was named "Pacha Khan".

== See also ==
- Ziauddin (Afghan militia leader)
- Abdullah Mujahid

| Preceded by None | Governor of Paktia Province, Afghanistan; December 2001–February 2002 | Succeeded by Taj Mohammad Wardak |
