= Coalition combat operations in Afghanistan in 2006 =

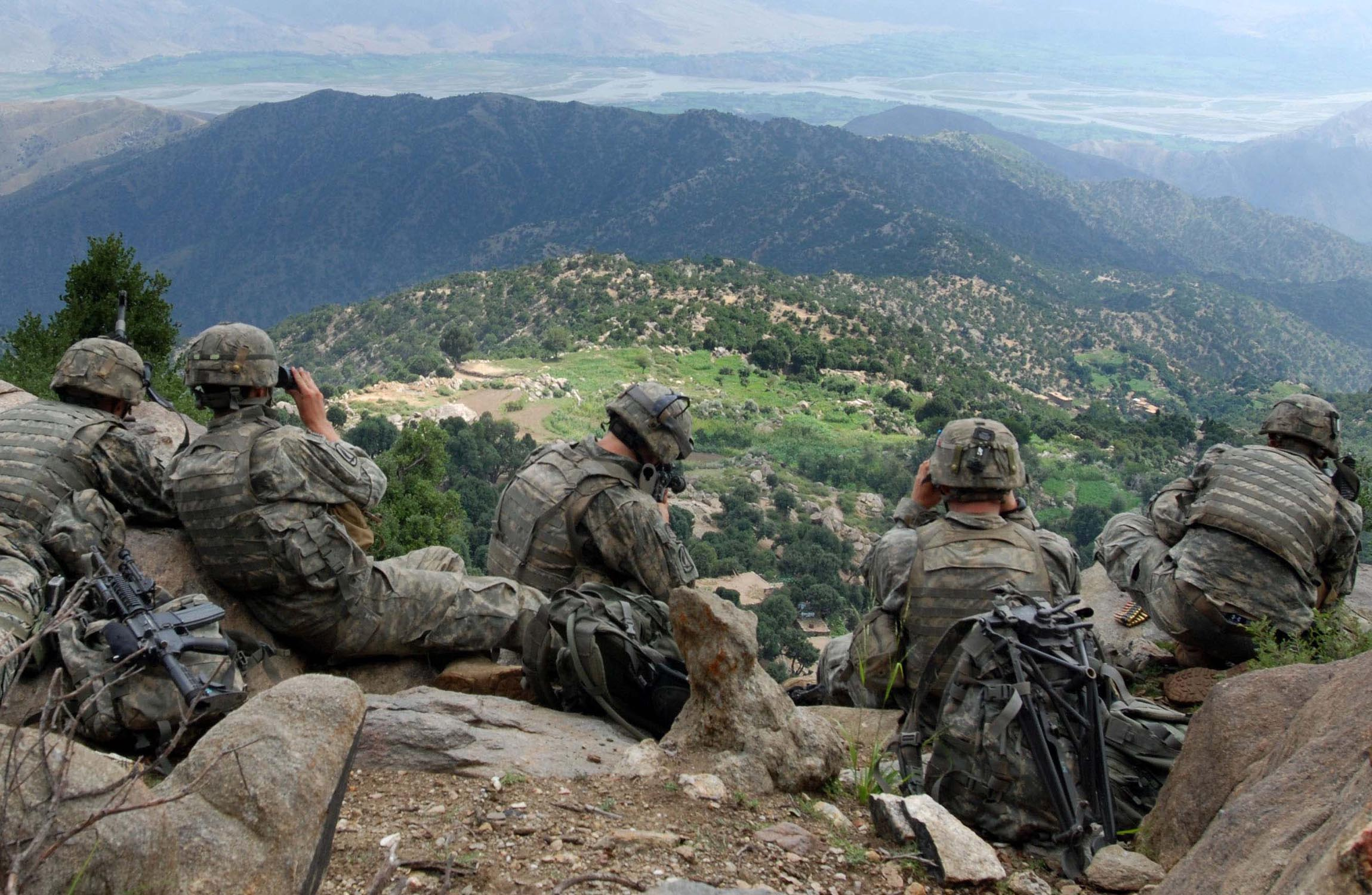
US troops from the 2nd Battalion, 503rd Infantry Regiment in Afghanistan, August 2006

In January 2006, NATO's focus in southern Afghanistan was to form Provincial Reconstruction Teams with the British leading in Helmand Province and the Netherlands, Australia and Canada leading similar deployments in Orūzgān Province and Kandahar Province respectively. The United States, with 2,200 troops, stayed in control of Zabul Province. Local Taliban figures voiced opposition to the incoming force and pledged to resist it, including the beginning of the 2006 Taliban offensive.

== Operations ==
From January 2006, a NATO International Security Assistance Force (ISAF) force started to replace U.S. troops in southern Afghanistan as part of Operation Enduring Freedom. The British 16th Air Assault Brigade (later reinforced by Royal Marines) formed the core of the force in Southern Afghanistan, along with troops and helicopters from Australia, Canada and the Netherlands. The initial force consisted of roughly 3,300 British, 2,500 Canadians, 1,963 from the Netherlands, 280 from Denmark, 240 from Australia, and 150 from Estonia. Air support was provided by US, British, Dutch, Norwegian and French combat aircraft and helicopters.

In 2006, southern Afghanistan has faced the deadliest spate in violence in the country since the ousting of the Taliban regime by U.S.-led forces in 2001, as the newly deployed NATO troops battled resurgent militants. Operation Mountain Thrust was launched on May 17, 2006, with the purpose of rooting out Taliban forces. Canadians were one of the leading combatants and the first fighting took place during the Battle of Panjwaii. Complex mud-walled compounds meant that the fighting in the rural Panjwaii district was similar to urban fighting in some places. Daily firefights, artillery bombardments, and coalition airstrikes turned the tide of the battle in favour of the Canadians. On July 3, 2006, it was reported that British Army leaders had warned Prime Minister Tony Blair that victory was not certain in Afghanistan, and were calling for more reinforcements. More than 1,100 Taliban fighters were killed and almost 400 captured in the month-and-a-half-long operation.

In July 2006, command of the international forces in southern Afghanistan was passed to NATO forces under British General David J. Richards. Regional command in the south was led by Canadian General David Fraser. In November 2006, Dutch Major-General Ton van Loon took over NATO Regional Command South in Afghanistan for a six-month period from the Canadians.

Canadian Forces, which came under NATO command at the end of July, launched Operation Medusa in an attempt to clear the areas of Taliban fighters once and for all. The fighting during Operation Medusa led the way to the second, and most fierce, Battle of Panjwaii during which the Canadians experienced daily gun-battles, ambushes, and mortar/rocket attacks. The Taliban had massed with an estimated 1,500 to 2,000 fighters and they were reluctant to give up the area. After being surrounded by the Canadian Forces, they dug in and fought a more conventional style battle. After weeks of fighting, the Taliban had been cleared from the Panjwaii area and Canadian reconstruction efforts in the area began. NATO reported it had killed more than 500 suspected Taliban fighters. During Operation Medusa, the Canadians were supported by US, British, Dutch and Danish forces. The PzH 2000 howitzer made its combat debut with the Dutch Army as artillery fire support.

A major NATO offensive called Operation Mountain Fury was launched in September 2006 to clear Taliban rebels from the eastern provinces of Afghanistan. The fighting was intense with a number of coalition casualties and heavy Taliban loses.

Along with the Canadians and Dutch, the British were a major contributor to the expanded NATO mission in southern Afghanistan in 2006. Having initially been deployed as part of Operation Veritas in 2001, British forces had played a supporting role to the Americans, but in 2006 the size of Britain's deployed forces was expanded as part of Operation Herrick. Throughout the year, around 5,000 British Armed Forces personnel deployed to Afghanistan, mainly in Helmand Province. They subsequently saw heavy fighting, particularly in the Sangin District.

NATO forces began reconstruction efforts after the major combat operations of Operation Medusa had ceased. But the British and Canadians still encountered fierce fighting. The Canadian involvement in Operation Mountain Fury was stepped up when they mounted an operation of their own called Operation Falcon's Summit on December 15, 2006. During Falcon Summit, the Canadians gained control of several key villages and towns that were former Taliban havens, such as Howz-E Madad. During the first week of the operation, massive Canadian artillery and tank barrages were carried out in a successful attempt to clear pockets of Taliban resistance.

An analysis of the coalition casualty figures from May 1 to August 12, 2006, by Sheila Bird, vice-president of the UK's Royal Statistical Society, revealed that during the period, an average of five coalition soldiers were killed every week by the Taliban, twice the death rate suffered during the 2003 invasion of Iraq.

The fighting for NATO forces was intense throughout the second half of 2006. NATO achieved several tactical victories over the Taliban and denied a number of areas to them, but the Taliban were not completely defeated and NATO operations continued into 2007.

== Air support ==
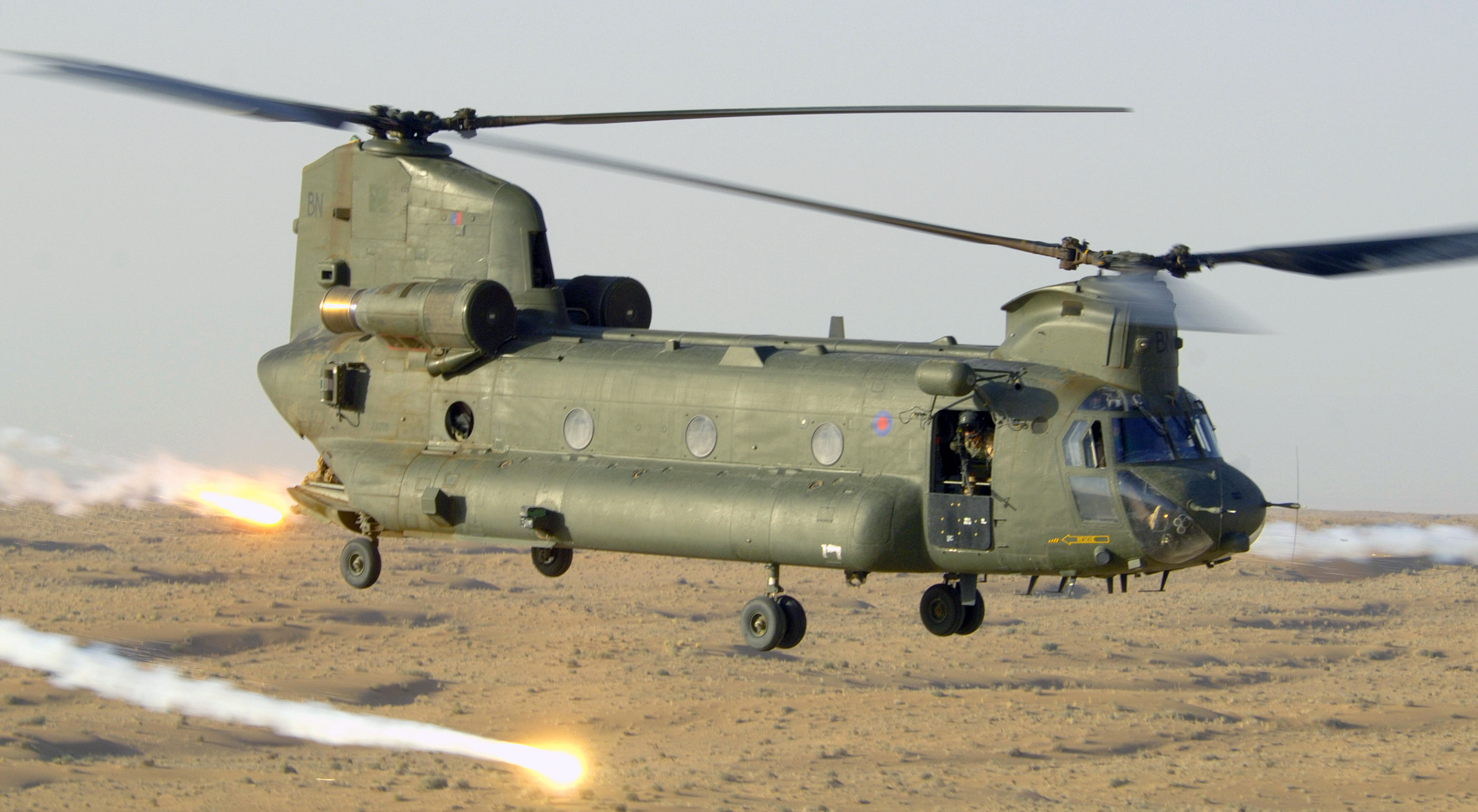
A British Chinook helicopter over Afghanistan

Reflecting the increased pace of operations, Royal Air Force (RAF) Harrier GR7A close air support aircraft saw a large increase in munitions (CRV7 rockets and laser-guided bombs) used supporting ground forces since July 2006. Between July and September, the theatre total for munitions deployed by British Harriers on planned operations and Close Air Support to ground forces rose from 179 to 539.

As well as the RAF and US aircraft, air support was also provided by Dutch and Norwegian F-16s and French Dassault Mirage 2000D ground attack aircraft. AH-64 Apache attack helicopters from the Netherlands, the UK and the USA supported NATO and Afghan National Army troops.

Transport helicopters were vital for coalition success to support isolated units and avoid roadside improvised explosive devices as well as to conduct medical evacuations. Various countries provided such platforms, including the Netherlands, Canada, the UK and the USA. C-130 transport aircraft also provided theatre transport.

On September 2, 14 UK personnel were killed when an RAF Nimrod MR2 crashed; initial reports were that mechanical failure was responsible.

American, British, Danish, Portuguese and Romanian airfield protection troops guarded the key NATO facility of Kandahar Airfield, which had come under Taliban rocket attacks.

== Casualties ==
The increased intensity of operations resulted in an increase in coalition casualties. Canadian forces lost 38 in operations in Afghanistan in 2006. In the same period, 24 British soldiers and marines were killed on the ground while one marine, one soldier and 12 airmen were killed when a Royal Air Force Nimrod crashed during a reconnaissance flight over Afghanistan on September 2, 2006. US military personnel have also been killed in support of NATO operations, 17 in 2006, as well as two Italians and one Romanian soldier. Operation Mountain Fury saw 71 Afghan National Army soldiers killed. A Dutch F-16 pilot also died in an air-crash.

The number of Taliban members killed in action in 2006 are difficult to verify, but around 2,700 are estimated to have died during Operation Mountain Thrust, Operation Medusa and Operation Mountain Fury.

The increase in fighting in southern Afghanistan also resulted in increased civilian casualties in the region.

== Criticism of some NATO allies ==
Despite the deployment of British and Dutch forces (and smaller forces from smaller European countries such as Denmark and Estonia), the Canadians were reported to have been frustrated at the lack of support from other major European NATO countries. Britain's defence secretary Des Browne shared criticism of those NATO allies for not sharing the burden.

Throughout 2006, Germany had ISAF ground troops in Afghanistan, but in the more secure north and resisted calls to help NATO forces except in the case of emergencies in the south. France also had troops in the more secure north, and deployed special forces and made available close air support aircraft for operations in the south, but also did not deploy significant ground troops to the south. Later during the conflict, though, in August 2008 French troops took on a larger role, and became involved in increased fighting after taking control of the Kabul regional command.

== Coalition order of battle ==
Not all ISAF troops deployed to Afghanistan in 2006 were involved in combat operations. This is a list of NATO and partner nation units involved in PRTs in southern Afghanistan and most heavily engaged in combat operations in 2006.

=== Australia ===
Australia is not a NATO nation but worked closely with Dutch forces, deploying a Reconstruction Task Force based around the 1st Combat Engineer Regiment with protective elements from the 5th/7th Battalion, Royal Australian Regiment, 6th Battalion, Royal Australian Regiment and 2nd Cavalry Regiment. A detachment of two CH-47 Chinook helicopters from the 5th Aviation Regiment was deployed to Afghanistan in March 2006 to support the Australian Special Forces Task Group. The Special Forces Task Group was withdrawn from Afghanistan in September 2006.

=== Canada ===
Roughly 2,500 Canadian Forces personnel were deployed in Afghanistan in 2006 over two rotations, mostly based in Kandahar. Core ground force units included the 1st Battalion, Princess Patricia's Canadian Light Infantry on the first rotation and the 1st Battalion The Royal Canadian Regiment on the second. Lord Strathcona's Horse (Royal Canadians) deployed Leopard C2 tanks in December 2006. A battery of the 1st Regiment Royal Canadian Horse Artillery provided artillery support for the first rotation, and a battery of the 2nd Regiment for the second. They provided support for the Canadians and coalition troops alike.

=== Denmark ===
About 700 troops deployed to the Helmand province, forming the Danish Battlegroup under the command of RC(S) (formerly designated Battlegroup Center) operating in the area surrounding the town of Gereshk.

=== Estonia ===
150 ground troops.

=== France ===
The French Air force had Dassault Mirage 2000Ds deployed at Dushanbe, Tajikistan, to support coalition forces in Afghanistan, from the 'EC 03.003' Ardennes unit.

=== Netherlands ===
The Netherlands deployed around 1,700 troops to southern Afghanistan, spread between Tarin Kowt (1,200), Kamp Holland at Multi National Base Tarin Kot, Deh Rahwod (300) and Kandahar. The Dutch also had several smaller FOBs throughout Uruzgan province. The soldiers of Task Force Uruzgan were mostly from the 12 Infanteriebataljon Regiment Van Heutsz supplemented with soldiers from 44 Pantserinfanteriebataljon Regiment Johan Willem Friso and the 42 Tankbataljon Regiment Huzaren Prins van Oranje. PzH 2000 self-propelled artillery pieces were deployed and used in combat for the first time.

An undisclosed number of Special Forces (Korps Commandotroepen) also operated in combat roles.

Royal Netherlands Air Force support consisted of four F-16 ground-attack aircraft (stationed at Kandahar Air Field), three Chinook transport helicopters of 298 Squadron stationed at Kandahar Airfield, five AS-532 Cougar transport helicopters, three C130 Hercules transport planes and five AH-64 attack helicopters of 301 Squadron at Camp Holland in Tarin Kowt.

=== Norway ===
Norway deployed four F-16 ground attack jets alongside Dutch F-16s. The detachment was known as the 1st Netherlands-Norwegian European Participating Forces Expeditionary Air Wing (1 NLD/NOR EEAW).

- Telemark Battalion (Telemark Bataljon), all serving with ISAF forces in northern Afghanistan.

Also special forces from the

- Armed Forces' Special Command (Forsvarets Spesialkommando).
- Army's Special Forces Command (Hærens Jegerkommando),
- Navy's Special Forces Command (Marinejegerkommandoen),
- Coastal Ranger Command (Kystjegerkommandoen)

=== Portugal ===
Portuguese paratroopers helped guard Kandahar Airfield.

=== Romania ===
Romanian troops from the 341st Infantry Battalion were based with the Canadians in Kandahar. Romanian airfield protection troops helped guard Kandahar Airfield. In 2007, Romania's contribution increased to a battlegroup in Zabual.

=== United Kingdom ===
During 2006, the 3rd Battalion, Parachute Regiment, were the first to be placed within Helmand Province, deployed within one thousand two hundred soldiers altogether of the Battle group including 16 Air Assault Brigade, subsequently replaced by Royal Marines of 3 Commando Brigade. These troops were replaced by the 12th Mechanised Brigade as the total number of UK personnel deployed was increased to nearly 7,000.

Air support was provided by 9 Regiment Army Air Corps (equipped with the Westland WAH-64 Apache) and the Royal Air Force (RAF)/Royal Navy Joint Force Harrier operating Harrier GR7 close air support and reconnaissance aircraft. RAF C-130 transport aircraft and CH-47 Chinook helicopters also deployed. Troops from 34 Squadron RAF Regiment assisted with the protection of Kandahar Airfield.

=== United States ===
In 2006, the US 10th Mountain Division supported NATO during Operation Mountain Fury. US special forces and air assets supported both NATO and non-NATO US missions.

US aircraft included Rockwell B-1 Lancer bombers of the 9th Expeditionary Bomber Squadron and Navy aircraft from Carrier Air Wing One operating from the USS Enterprise (CVN-65).

In March 2006, the Towr Kham Fire Base was established in the northwest by a platoon-sized force a few minutes from the Towr Kham checkpoint on the Pakistan border, on the route into the Khyber Pass.

== See also ==
- Timeline of the War in Afghanistan (2001-2021)
- Britain's role in the 2001-present Afghan war
- Canada's role in the invasion of Afghanistan
- 2006 Taliban offensive
- Coalition combat operations in Afghanistan in 2007
- Coalition combat operations in Afghanistan in 2008
- Operation Enduring Freedom
- Protests against the invasion of Afghanistan
- Participants in Operation Enduring Freedom
- Provincial reconstruction team
- War in Afghanistan (2001–2021)
