= Operation Mountain Fury =

Military operation in Afghanistan

- Part of the War in Afghanistan (2001–2021)
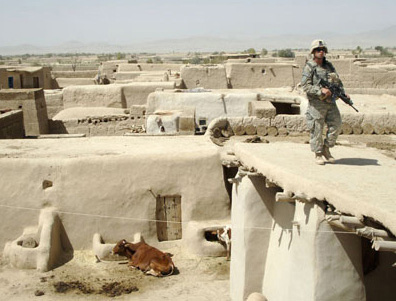
- A soldier searches for weapons caches in the village of Alizai in Ghazni Province, Afghanistan.
Date	September 16, 2006 – January 15, 2007
Location	Paktika, Khost, Ghazni, Paktia, Logar
Result	Coalition victory

Belligerents
Islamic Republic of Afghanistan; Canada; United States; United Kingdom; Netherlands; Italy; Estonia	(Afghanistan) Taliban al-Qaeda

Commanders and leaders
(United Kingdom) Gen. David Richards	(Afghanistan) Mullah Akhtar Mohammad Osmani †

Strength
(Afghanistan) 4,000; 3,000; Total: 7,000	Unknown

Operation Mountain Fury was a NATO-led operation begun on September 16, 2006 as a follow-up operation to Operation Medusa, to clear Taliban insurgents from the eastern provinces of Afghanistan. Another focus of the operation was to enable reconstruction projects such as schools, health-care facilities, and courthouses to take place in the targeted provinces.

During the operation, the Taliban suffered heavy losses during direct battle with NATO coalition forces; as a result, they are expected to focus more on tactics such as the use of improvised explosive devices (IEDs), according to sources such as NATO's top commander James L. Jones and Canadian defence minister Gordon O'Connor. Jones also linked the large-scale production of opium to increased insurgent violence.

== The Canadians continue fighting in Panjwaii ==
The Canadian forces began reconstruction efforts after major combat operations of Operation Medusa had ceased. However, they still encountered fierce fighting. Canadian Forces began the construction of a road, code-named "Summit", from the Panjwaii area to outlying areas including Kandahar city and came under continued Taliban attacks both in Panjwaii and in Kandahar city with ambushes, IED attacks or suicide bombings taking the lives of a number of Canadian and American soldiers. The Canadian involvement in operation Mountain Fury was stepped up when they mounted an operation of their own called Operation Falcon's Summit on December 15, 2006. During Falcon Summit, the Canadians gained control of several key villages and towns that were former Taliban havens, such as Howz-E Madad. During the first week of the operation, massive Canadian artillery barrages and tank attacks were used in a successful attempt to clear pockets of Taliban resistance.

== The Americans go on the offensive ==
Meanwhile, the Americans began their combat operations against the Taliban forces that were entrenched in the mountains on the border with Pakistan in the east in the provinces of Paktika, Khost, Ghazni, Paktia, Logar and Nuristan. The 10th Mountain Division led the charge establishing many remote outposts in regions that were previously Taliban dominated. These outposts came under continued attacks as did the American combat patrols which resulted in almost 150 casualties inflicted on the Americans in two and a half months by the beginning of December.

== The British attack repelled ==
On December 5, 2006, the British Royal Marines attacked a Taliban-held valley in southern Afghanistan near Garmsir but withdrew after a ferocious Taliban counterattack that withstood air strikes and artillery fire. Scores of soldiers moved across a bridge over the Helmand River under a full moon shortly before daybreak and began sweeping south through wheatfields in the south of the province, the opium center of the world's major producer. Marines initially faced only sporadic resistance but when they advanced, Taliban fighters launched a ferocious, organized riposte with heavy weapons and tried to outflank the British troops. The Taliban withstood barrages of air strikes from AH-64 Apache helicopters, 500 pound bombs dropped by B-1 bombers and withering cannon fire from A-10 Thunderbolt II attack jets before the British finally withdrew after a 10-hour battle. The Taliban, who say they have the expertise to defeat the strongest army, had dug sophisticated networks of trenches often leading from compound to compound. The assault was the latest in a series of battles by British forces around the bridgehead and the short road at the north end of the valley, criss-crossed by networks of ancient canals that make Helmand fertile enough to produce a third of the world's opium crop. The British said they considered the assault a success as they had cleared out areas near the "D.C.," a tiny strip of road and ruined buildings on the eastern side of the Helmand River, but without more Afghan troops to hold the ground there was little hope of doing much more.

== Mullah Osmani Killed ==
On 19 December 2006, a NATO air strike targeted a car in a deserted area of Helmand province, killed Mullah Akhtar Mohammad Osmani along with two other men. He was the top Taliban commander for all of their operations in southern Afghanistan.

== The British attack again ==
The next month, an operation called Operation Clay was launched on New Year's Day. Plymouth-based 42 Commando were engaged in four days of fighting. The British had running firefights for up to four days against fairly coherent sustained attacks of small arms, rockets and indirect fire. About 110 Royal Marines carried out the operation in northern Helmand. During the operation British troops destroyed a Taliban training camp and killed dozens of insurgents, according to the military.

From the 13th to the 15th of January, 2007, Royal Marines fought Taliban forces in the south of Helmand, attacking their positions and a major base. During the fighting one Royal Marine was killed and several were wounded. The Taliban suffered at least 30 killed.

== Timeline of events ==
- September 18, 2006 - 19 people, including 4 Canadian soldiers, were killed by a suicide bomber in the Panjwaye District, Kandahar Province; in Kabul, 4 Afghan police and 11 civilians were killed in two suicide bomb explosions.
- September 19, 2006 - 11 Taliban and 8 other insurgents were killed in offensive operations in Helmand Province; 4 al-Qaeda operatives were arrested in Kabul.
- September 20, 2006 - 34 Taliban and up to 10 other insurgents were killed in various conflicts, as well as one Afghan policeman and an Italian soldier serving in ISAF.
- September 21, 2006 - 4 Taliban fighters were killed as they attempted to destroy an oil tanker, and 5 more were detained by U.S. forces, including a regional commander. One Italian soldier died in a vehicle accident in Kabul.
- September 23, 2006 - 19 laborers are killed on a bus in Kandahar Province; 25 Taliban die in battle with police in Orūzgān Province; 10 Taliban fighters killed near Helmand Province.
- September 24, 2006 - Afghan and coalition forces killed 63 Taliban fighters in three separate engagements and captured 21 others in a separate operation.
- September 25, 2006 - 10 militants were killed by coalition forces in Paktika, while 2 suicide bombers wounded one American soldier and separately 2 Afghan police were killed in a Taliban attack.
- September 26, 2006 - A Taliban suicide bomber killed 9 Afghan soldiers, while elsewhere 8 militants died in explosions and one Italian soldier died. 2 militants were arrested in connection with the suicide bombing.
- September 27, 2006 - A suicide bomber hit just outside a Canadian base, wounding a civilian. In other operations 31 Taliban fighters were killed and 20 were captured.
- September 29, 2006 - Two militants and an Afghan police officer were killed in a clash and elsewhere a Canadian soldier was killed in an explosion.
- September 30, 2006 - A suicide bomber killed a dozen Afghan civilians.
- October 2, 2006 - The Taliban attacked a police station and started a gunbattle in Paktika that killed three police and ten militants BakuTODAY.net -.
- October 4 to 6, 2006 - 2 suicide bombers killed numerous civilians and a police officer.
- October 6, 2006 - Coalition troops arrested a suicide bomber. A Canadian soldier was killed in an explosion on "ambush alley" in the Battle of Panjwaii.
- October 7, 2006 - A suicide bomber attacked a NATO base, causing no damage. Elsewhere on the same day, the Taliban attacked a patrol, killing one Canadian soldier. In Pakistan 48 suspected Taliban fighters were captured. Meanwhile, an offensive by American and Afghan troops killed 30 more Taliban fighters.
- October 8, 2006 - 24 Taliban fighters and 1 Afghan soldier were killed. Two Taliban fighters were also arrested. On Monday the 9th, 16 more Taliban and another Afghan soldier were killed.
- October 12, 2006 - 2 Taliban suicide bombers hit two patrols, wounding bystanders. Also on Thursday, 20 Taliban fighters were killed in fighting with Afghan and coalition forces.
- October 13, 2006 - A Taliban suicide bomber hit a NATO patrol, killing an American soldier and 8 civilians. Later in the day Afghan police repelled a Taliban attack, killing 3 insurgents.
- October 14, 2006 - 8 Afghan policemen and 4 Taliban fighters were killed and nine more were captured. Overnight, a battle between Taliban and Afghan police left 3 Afghan police and at least one Taliban fighter dead. Two Canadian soldiers were killed in combat in Kandahar and two were wounded in the Battle of Panjwaii.
- October 15, 2006 - Coalition forces captured 3 Taliban fighters and killed 4, disrupting a bombing cell.
- October 16, 2006 - 2 Taliban suicide bombers killed 4 Afghan civilians. That same day, 3 more insurgents were killed.
- October 17, 2006 - In an airstrike, NATO forces killed 24 Taliban militants including a man they designated as a mid-level commander. Another 24 militants were also killed and another 8 more arrested in another incident.
- October 18, 2006 - ISAF and Afghan forces killed 32 Taliban fighters after an ambush.
- October 19, 2006 - 2 Taliban suicide bombers hit, one in Lashkar Gah, and the other in Khost. The first killed 2 children and the second killed an Afghan police officer. 5 Taliban fighters were killed by a NATO airstrike in an encampment in the Gayan district of Paktika province Defence News : NATO strike kills five Taliban insurgents; ANA forces fire D30 howitzers near the Pakistan border, the first indirect field artillery fires in the history of the ANA.
- October 20, 2006 - A Taliban suicide bomber killed one Afghan soldier and ISAF forces killed one Taliban fighter and captured 4.
- October 22, 2006 - 15 militants were killed after they ambushed an ISAF patrol; the ANA conducted the first field artillery counterfires near the Pakistani border resulting in 10 insurgent casualties.
- October 23, 2006 - 15 Taliban militants were captured trying to enter Kabul with explosives.
- October 25, 2006 - 48 Taliban militants were killed by NATO strikes at 3 separate groups gathering near Kandahar.
- October 28, 2006 - Up to 70 Taliban fighters were killed when they attacked a military patrol north of Tarin Kowt, in Oruzgan province. The battle killed one ISAF soldier.
- October 30, 2006 - 55 Taliban fighters were killed and 20 injured, and one NATO soldier was killed, in a six-hour battle between Taliban fighters and elements of Charlie Company 1st Battalion, 4th Infantry Regiment in the Daychopan district of Zabul province. Also three NATO soldiers were wounded as Taliban fighters attacked their convoy in eastern Afghanistan.
- October 31, 2006 - 12 Taliban fighters and one NATO soldiers were killed in an engagement after a roadside bomb killed 3 NATO troops and a suicide bomber killed an Afghan police officer. Also two NATO soldiers were wounded in a suicide bombing in Ghazni Province. Three American soldiers were killed by an IED in Nuristan province.
- November 1, 2006 - 3 insurgents were killed and one captured by US and Afghan troops in the Khost province. A suicide bomber wounded two NATO soldiers in Kandahar.
- November 3, 2006 - 6 Afghan police officers were killed in an ambush by Taliban insurgents.
- November 4, 2006 - 7 Taliban fighters are killed in a NATO airstrike.
- November 6, 2006 - At least two insurgents are killed by coalition forces and six others are detained, including an Al-Qaeda operative, while one American and two Afghan soldiers are killed.
- November 8, 2006 - 28 militants are killed in two separate engagements, 3 Afghan police are killed in an ambush and three militants are captured by coalition troops.
- November 9, 2006 - Clashes continue, 6 more Taliban fighters killed.
- November 10, 2006 - NATO forces kill 12 Taliban fighters.
- November 11, 2006 - NATO forces bomb a compound in the Bermal district of eastern Afghanistan, killing at least 20 Taliban fighters.
- November 12, 2006 - NATO forces capture 6 Taliban fighters including an Arab and a Pakistani.
- November 16, 2006 - 2 civilians are accidentally killed by British troops, 6 militants die elsewhere.
- November 23, 2006 - A mortar attack on a patrol kills one American soldier and wounds another in Kabul province.
- November 25, 2006 - 55 insurgents are killed by Afghan troops, one is killed.
- November 27, 2006 - A suicide bomber kills 2 Canadian soldiers in Kandahar province.
- November 28, 2006 - 2 suicide bombers kill one policeman and wound another policeman and one NATO soldier in Herat and Kandahar provinces. Two American soldiers are killed and one is wounded when their patrol hits a roadside bomb near Kabul.
- November 29, 2006 - 6 militants are killed in Kandahar province during an Afghan raid.
- December 1, 2006 - 16 Taliban fighters are killed and nine are captured, including two top commanders.
- December 3, 2006 - A suicide bomber wounded three NATO soldiers and killed three civilians in Kandahar. The soldiers responded to the attacks that resulted in the deaths of five civilians.
- December 4, 2006 - At least 7 Taliban fighters are killed in clashes with NATO.
- December 5, 2006 - Four more insurgents are shot dead. Two NATO soldiers are wounded in Kandahar by a suicide bomber. A British attack on a Taliban-held valley results in the death of one soldier and wounding of another. The attack is repelled and British forces fail to complete their objectives.
- December 6, 2006 - Taliban shoot dead five civilians, while clashes in southern Afghanistan kill 5 of their members.
- December 11, 2006 - NATO airstrikes kill nine insurgents while Afghan troops kill three more.
- December 19, 2006 - A NATO airstrike targeting a car in a deserted area of Helmand province killed Mullah Akhtar Mohammad Osmani along with two other men.
- January 11, 2007 - Up to 150 Taliban fighters are killed in battles with NATO forces.
- January 13, 2007 - 30 Taliban fighters and one British soldier are killed in a NATO operation.
- January 15, 2007 - Operation formally declared over.

== See also ==
- Coalition combat operations in Afghanistan in 2006
- List of massacres in Afghanistan
