= Harjit Sajjan =

Canadian politician (born 1970)

The Honourable Harjit Sajjan PC OMM MSM CD
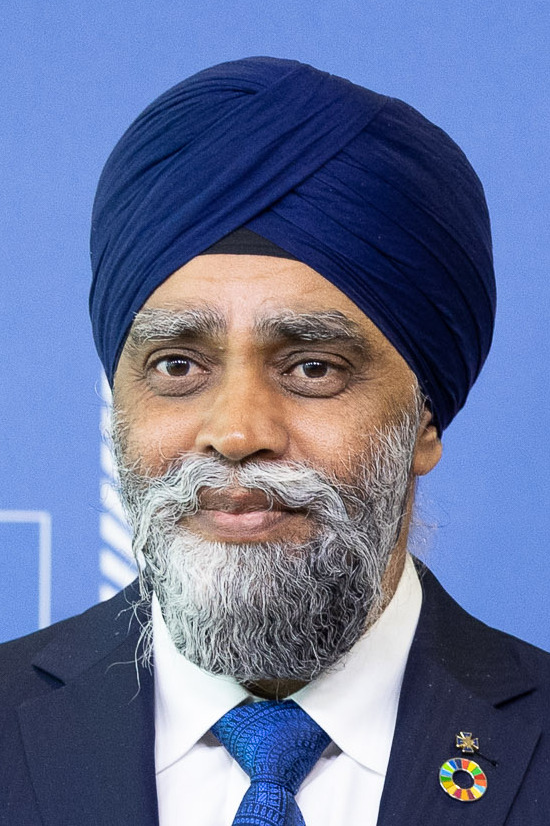
- Sajjan in 2023

President of the King's Privy Council for Canada
- In office July 26, 2023 – March 14, 2025
- Prime Minister: Justin Trudeau
- Preceded by: Bill Blair
- Succeeded by: Dominic LeBlanc

Minister of Emergency Preparedness
- In office July 26, 2023 – March 14, 2025
- Prime Minister: Justin Trudeau
- Preceded by: Bill Blair
- Succeeded by: David McGuinty

Minister responsible for the Pacific Economic Development Agency of Canada
- In office October 26, 2021 – March 14, 2025
- Prime Minister: Justin Trudeau
- Preceded by: Position established
- Succeeded by: Gregor Robertson

Minister of International Development
- In office October 26, 2021 – July 26, 2023
- Prime Minister: Justin Trudeau
- Preceded by: Karina Gould
- Succeeded by: Ahmed Hussen

Minister of National Defence
- In office November 4, 2015 – October 26, 2021
- Prime Minister: Justin Trudeau
- Preceded by: Jason Kenney
- Succeeded by: Anita Anand

Minister of Veterans Affairs
- Acting; February 12, 2019 – March 1, 2019
- Prime Minister: Justin Trudeau
- Preceded by: Jody Wilson-Raybould
- Succeeded by: Lawrence MacAulay

Member of Parliament for Vancouver South
- In office October 19, 2015 – March 23, 2025
- Preceded by: Wai Young
- Succeeded by: Riding dissolved

Personal details
- Born: Harjit Singh Sajjan; September 6, 1970 (age 55) Bombeli, Punjab, India
- Party: Liberal
- Spouse: Kuljit Kaur (m. 1996)
- Children: 2
- Occupation: Politician
- Profession: Police officer

Military service
- Allegiance: Canada
- Branch: Canadian Army
- Service years: 1989–2015
- Rank: Lieutenant-Colonel
- Unit: Royal Canadian Regiment
- Commands: British Columbia Regiment
- Conflicts / operations: Bosnian War; NATO intervention; War in Afghanistan; Operation Medusa
- Awards: Order of Military Merit; Meritorious Service Medal; Canadian Forces' Decoration; South-West Asia Service Medal; General Campaign Star; Commendation Medal; NATO Service Medal; Canadian Peacekeeping Service Medal
- Police career
- Department: Vancouver Police Department
- Branch: Gang Crime Unit
- Status: Retired
- Rank: Detective

Harjit Singh Sajjan (Note: /ˈhɑːrdʒiːt ˈsɪŋ ˈsædʒən/; HAR-jeet SING SAJ-ən) (born September 6, 1970) is a Canadian former politician, military officer, and police officer who was the member of Parliament (MP) for Vancouver South from 2015 to 2025. A member of the Liberal Party, Sajjan held a number of Cabinet positions. He was Minister of National Defence from 2015 to 2021, Minister of International Development from 2021 to 2023, and Minister of Emergency Preparedness and President of the Privy Council from 2023 to 2025. Before entering politics, Sajjan was a Vancouver Police Department detective and a lieutenant-colonel in the Canadian Army.

== Early and personal life ==
Sajjan was born on September 6, 1970, in Bombeli, a village in the Hoshiarpur district of Punjab, India. His father, Kundan Singh Sajjan, was a head constable with the Punjab Police in India. His father was a member of the board of the World Sikh Organization, which has been described as a radical Sikh group. Sajjan, along with his mother and older sister, immigrated to Canada in 1976, when he was five years old, to join their father who had left for BC two years earlier to work at a sawmill. While the family was getting established in their new life in Canada, his mother worked on berry farms in BC Lower Mainland during the summer where Sajjan and his sister would frequently join her. Harjit Singh grew up in South Vancouver.

Sajjan married Kuljit Kaur, a family physician in 1996, and they have a son and a daughter, Arjun and Jeevut.

Sajjan was baptized as a Sikh when he was a teenager, seeing it as a way to get away from a bad crowd, such as his classmate Bindy Johal who became a notorious gangster.

== Military and police career ==
Sajjan joined The British Columbia Regiment (Duke of Connaught's Own) in 1989 as a trooper and was commissioned as an officer in 1991. He eventually rose to the rank of lieutenant-colonel. He deployed overseas four times in the course of his career: once to Bosnia and Herzegovina, and three times to Afghanistan. Sajjan began his 11-year career as an officer of the Vancouver Police Department after returning from his Bosnian deployment. He ended his career with the Vancouver Police Department as a detective with the department's gang crimes unit specializing in drug trafficking and organized-crime investigation.

Sajjan's first deployment to Afghanistan was shortly before the start of Operation Medusa in 2006, during which he took leave from his work in the Vancouver Police Department's gang squad. He deployed with the 1st Battalion, Royal Canadian Regiment Battle Group in Kandahar and worked as a liaison officer with the Afghan police. Sajjan found that corruption in the Afghan government was driving recruitment to the Taliban. After reporting these findings to Brigadier General David Fraser, Sajjan was tasked with helping the general plan aspects of Operation Medusa.

Fraser evaluated Sajjan's leadership during the operation as "nothing short of brilliant". When Sajjan returned to Vancouver, Fraser sent a letter to the police department which called Sajjan "the best single Canadian intelligence asset in theatre", stated that his work saved "a multitude of coalition lives", and noted that the Canadian Forces should "seek his advice on how to change our entire tactical intelligence training and architecture". Sajjan was mentioned in dispatches for the usefulness of his tactical counterinsurgency knowledge in the planning and implementation of an unnamed operation in September 2006 to secure important terrain.

Upon his return, Sajjan left his position with the Vancouver police, but stayed as a reservist and started his own consulting business that taught intelligence gathering techniques to Canadian and American military personnel. He also consulted for US policy analyst and Afghanistan expert Barnett Rubin, which began as a correspondence over Sajjan's views on how to tackle the Afghan opium trade and evolved into a collaboration as advisers to American military and diplomatic leaders in Afghanistan.

Sajjan returned to Afghanistan for another tour of duty in 2009, taking another tour of leave from the Vancouver Police Department to do so. Having already taken two leaves of absence, Sajjan had to leave the Vancouver Police Department for his third tour of duty in 2010, during which he was assigned as a special assistant to then Major-General James L. Terry, the commander of American forces in Afghanistan.

In 2011, he became the first Sikh to command a Canadian Army reserve regiment when he was named commander of The British Columbia Regiment (Duke of Connaught's Own).

He was bestowed with the Meritorious Service Medal in 2012 for diluting the Taliban's influence in Kandahar Province. He has also been awarded the Canadian Peacekeeping Service Medal, the Order of Military Merit award, and served as Aide-de-Camp to the lieutenant governor of British Columbia.

His Sikh beliefs require him to keep his facial hair which prevents the use of regular military gas masks, so Sajjan invented his own gas mask that worked with his beard, and patented it in 1996.

== Political career ==
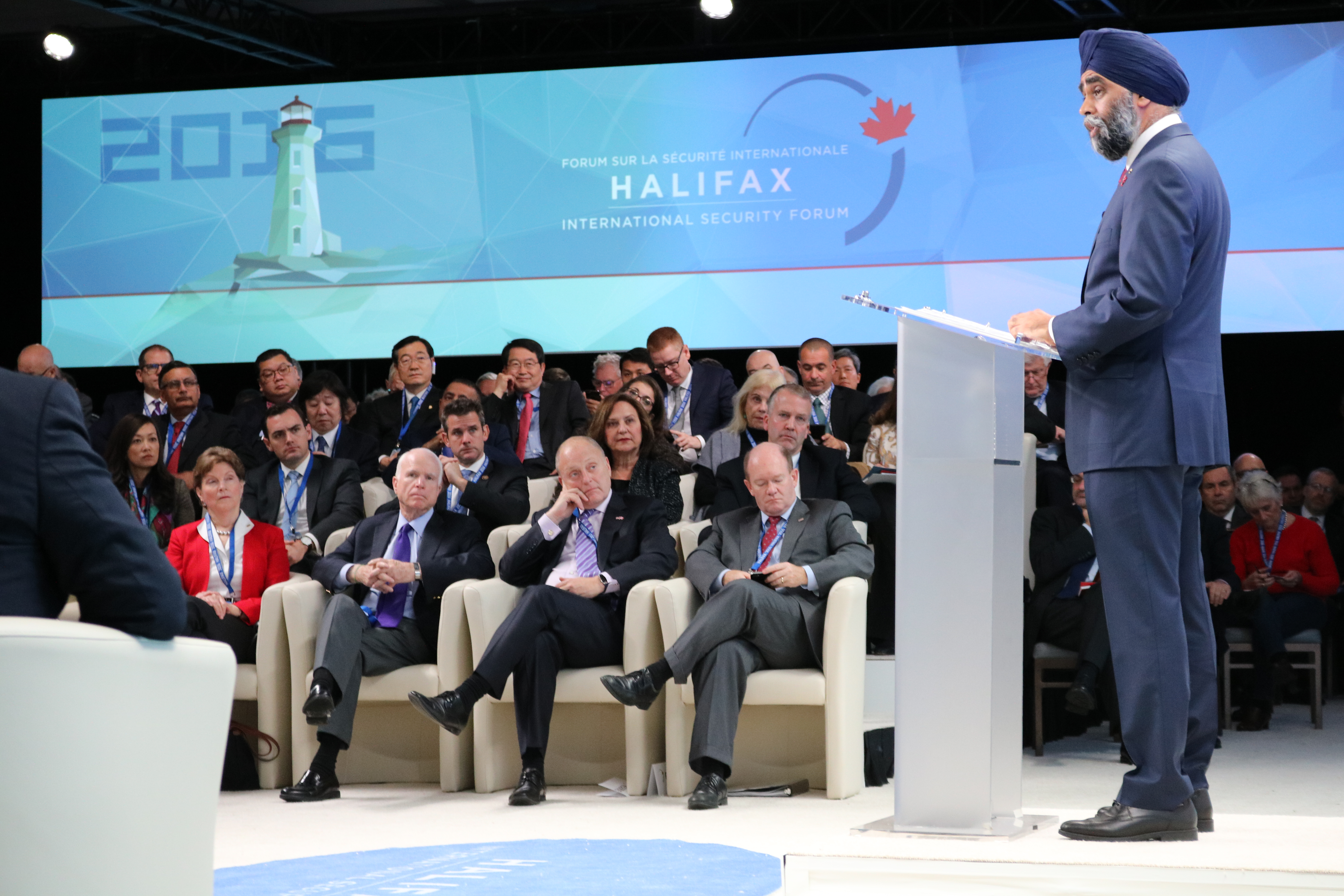
Sajjan speaking at the Halifax International Security Forum in 2016

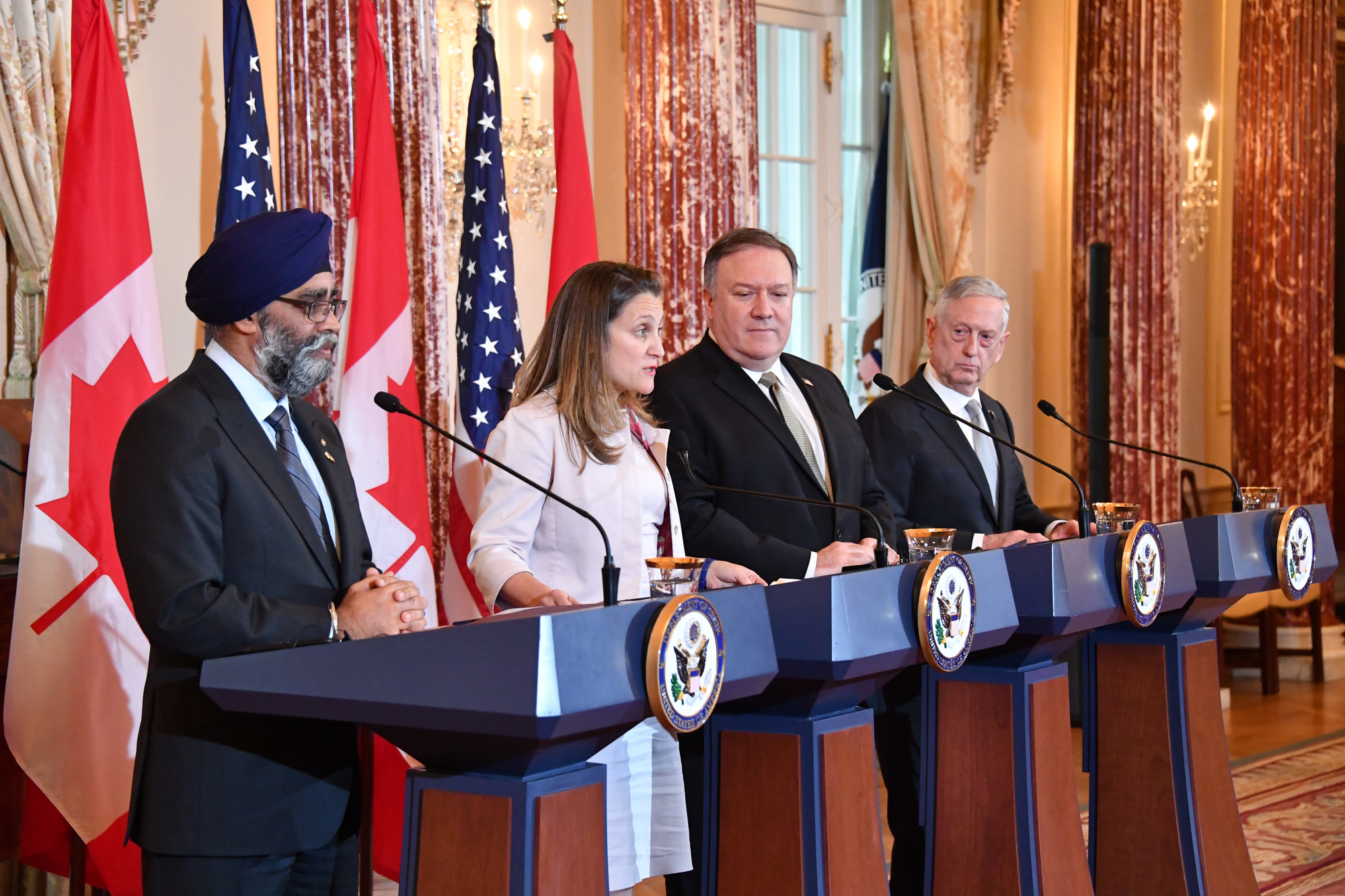
Sajjan with U.S. Secretary of State Mike Pompeo and U.S. Secretary of Defense James Mattis in 2018

Sajjan was elected for the riding of Vancouver South during the 2015 federal election, defeating Conservative incumbent Wai Young. Sajjan was appointed minister of national defence in the federal Cabinet, headed by Justin Trudeau, on November 4, 2015. He was also briefly acting Minister of Veterans Affairs in February 2019 following the resignation of Jody Wilson-Raybould, until the appointment of Lawrence MacAulay to the portfolio.

His alleged links with the Khalistan movement caused diplomatic friction with Punjab's former chief minister, Amarinder Singh. Harjit Sajjan also faced allegations from New Democratic Party (NDP) that he was "playing down his connections to the detainee controversy during the [Afghanistan] combat mission [Medusa], where Canadians handed over prisoners to torture by Afghan authorities."

In September 2019, Sajjan attended an event held to celebrate the 70th anniversary of the founding of the People's Republic of China, for which he was subsequently criticized by the Conservatives. A spokesperson for Sajjan said that he appeared in his capacity as a candidate for his riding and did not stay for long.

=== Controversy over role in Operation Medusa ===
In an April 2017 public speech in New Delhi, Sajjan called himself "the architect" of Operation Medusa, a September 2006 Canadian offensive operation to remove Taliban fighters from around Kandahar. In July 2015, Sajjan had made the same claim during an appearance on the British Columbia-based program Conversations That Matter, stating that General Jonathan Vance, the chief of the defence staff at the time the story broke in 2017, saw him as "the architect" of the 2006 operation. At the time of Operation Medusa, Sajjan was a major in the Canadian Army reserve and a liaison officer to Task Force Kandahar, where large combat operations such as Medusa were usually worked upon by generals and colonels.

One of the anonymous officers cited in the National Post, which first broke the story, called Sajjan's statement "a bald-faced lie", while others praised him on a personal level and for his expert intelligence work, but found his claim "really, quite outrageous" because the planning for Operation Medusa was collaborative. Canadian historian Jack Granatstein said that Sajjan was a skilled intelligence officer who would have presented important intelligence in the leadup to the operation, but that he "certainly wouldn't have been the chief planner". Granatstein said that while the mistake was not one that was worth resigning over, it would still hurt his relationship with the military. In an interview on AM640, Christopher Vernon, a British officer who served as chief of staff for NATO forces in Southern Afghanistan at Kandahar during Medusa, said that Sajjan's role in the planning was "more than integral" and that Sajjan was a "pivotal player" in the operation. Vernon noted that Sajjan had worked "hand-in-glove" with the Australian lieutenant colonel who was the lead planner and that without Sajjan's intelligence work, the operation would not have happened. Brigadier-General David Fraser had also extensively praised the indispensable nature of Sajjan's role in Operation Medusa.

Sajjan issued apologies in which he apologized to members of the Canadian Forces, the United States Armed Forces, and the Afghan Armed Forces in the operation, and noted that the successes of Operation Medusa were due to the contributions of all members of the Canadian Forces who were involved. Sajjan also acknowledged that describing himself as "the architect" was a mistake, and highlighted the role of Brigadier-General David Fraser in leading the team that planned the operation.

Sajjan was supported by Justin Trudeau amidst calls from the opposition for him to resign. A failed vote of no confidence in Sajjan was put forth by the Conservatives in the House of Commons. He was censured by the House of Commons in 2021 for "misleading Canadians about his service record".

Sajjan was moved from Minister of National Defence to minister of international development in an October 2021 cabinet reshuffle.

=== Controversy over handling of sexual assault within the Canadian Armed Forces ===
Sajjan has come under substantial criticism for his handling of sexual assault within the Canadian Armed Forces. According to Megan MacKenzie, a sexual assault expert and academic, "Sajjan already has zero credibility on this issue and, at this point, it's unclear what it would take to remove him from this position given the clear signs he is not capable of leading or enacting change when it comes to military sexual violence".

In 2018, Sajjan was presented with alleged evidence of a sexual assault by General Jonathan Vance but refused to look at it. Gary Walbourne, the military's ombudsman, told a parliamentary committee that he had privately warned Sajjan of the allegations against Vance.

Sajjan was censured by the House of Commons in 2021 over his handling of the sexual misconduct issue.

=== Controversy over Kabul evacuation ===
In 2024, The Globe and Mail reported that, as Defence Minister, Sajjan instructed Canadian special forces to rescue about 225 Afghan Sikhs during the 2021 evacuation of Kabul. Anonymous military sources cited by the Globe and Mail accused Sajjan of misusing military resources that could otherwise have been dedicated to evacuating Canadian citizens and Afghans linked to Canada. While Canadian armed forces managed to airlift 3,700 people out of Afghanistan, predominantly Canadian citizens and permanent residents, citizens of allied countries, and Afghans who worked for Canada, 1,250 Canadian citizens/permanent residents and hundreds of Afghans who assisted the Canadian army were left behind.

Sajjan alleged that he merely passed along information about the Sikhs to the military and did not issue any direct orders to rescue them. However, General Wayne Eyre, the Chief of the Defence Staff, told the media that the military was following "legal orders" when it attempted the rescue of the Sikhs. An anonymous special forces officer told the Globe:“There was such furious anger that the last 24 hours were solely dedicated to getting the Sikhs out”.

The Bloc Québécois and former Conservative Party leader Erin O’Toole called on the government to investigate Sajjan's actions.

The Globe and Mail's editorial board wrote that "Sajjan failed Canada, and Canadians" by compromising the evacuation of Canadian citizens and people with links to Canada through his request.

Bloc Quebecois MP Christine Normandin, criticized Sajjan's actions, stating: "We learned through The Globe and Mail that the minister might have provided some directives to prioritize the evacuation of Afghans of the Sikh faith to the detriment of Canadians" and "Certain individuals including [former Canadian military] interpreters were left behind because the resources to evacuate people were limited." She later moved a motion, which was unanimously adopted, calling for Sajjan along with other senior officials to testify.

The Globe also reported that directors of the Manmeet Singh Bhullar Foundation, a Canadian Sikh group that sought to privately sponsor Afghan Sikhs' arrival to Canada, made multiple donations to Sajjan's Liberal riding association; the donations coincided with the foundation pressing Sajjan and the government to rescue a group of Afghan Sikhs during the Kabul evacuation. Sajjan claimed that the foundation reached out to him personally, and he relayed the information provided to him by the foundation to the military's chain of command. The donations also coincided with Sajjan seeking reelection during the 2021 Canadian federal election.

In September 2024, it was reported that the House of Commons committee on national defence planned to investigate Sajjan's actions during the Kabul evacuation.

=== Controversy over proposed use of military personnel for concert ===
In 2024, The Globe and Mail reported that as Minister of International Development, Sajjan requested 100 soldiers to act as backdrops for a pop concert by Punjabi musician Diljit Dosanjh. The request was refused by the Canadian Forces. Sajjan's spokesman defended the request, saying that Dosanjh "is the biggest Punjabi artist in the world".

== Honours and decorations ==
Sajjan has received the following honours and decorations during and after his military career.

Ribbon	Description	Notes
	Order of Military Merit (OMM)	Appointed Officer (OMM) on 17 October 2012
	Meritorious Service Medal (MSM)	Awarded August 22, 2012; Military Division
	South-West Asia Service Medal	With Clasp "AFGHANISTAN"
	General Campaign Star	South West Asia Ribbon; 2 Rotation Bars
	Mentioned in dispatches	Awarded June 4, 2008
	NATO Medal for the former Yugoslavia	with FORMER YUGOSLAVIA clasp
	Canadian Peacekeeping Service Medal	
	Queen Elizabeth II Golden Jubilee Medal	Decoration awarded in 2002; Canadian version
	Queen Elizabeth II Diamond Jubilee Medal	Decoration awarded in 2012; Canadian version
	King Charles III Coronation Medal	June 20, 2025; Canadian version
	Canadian Forces' Decoration (CD)	with one Clasp for 22 years of services
	Commendation Medal	From the Secretary of Defense of the United States of America
	Chief of Defence Staff Commendation	
	Deputy Minister Award	From the Department of National Defence
	Top 25 Canadian Immigrant Awards	2016 recipient

== Electoral record ==
2021 Canadian federal election: Vancouver South
Party	Candidate	Votes	%	±%	Expenditures
Liberal	Harjit Sajjan	19,910	49.43	+8.20	$82,846.68
New Democratic	Sean McQuillan	9,922	24.63	+6.07	$3,175.98
Conservative	Sukhbir Singh Gill	9,060	22.49	–10.82	$92,566.51
People's	Anthony Cook	1,104	2.74	+1.51	$1,151.17
Marxist–Leninist	Anne Jamieson	287	0.71	–	none listed
Total valid votes/expense limit		40,283	98.79	–	$108,408.40
Total rejected ballots		493	1.21	+0.22	
Turnout		40,776	54.52	–3.78	
Eligible voters		74,785			
Liberal hold		Swing		+7.14	
Source: Elections Canada

2019 Canadian federal election: Vancouver South
Party	Candidate	Votes	%	±%	Expenditures
Liberal	Harjit Sajjan	17,808	41.23	–7.58	$94,051.97
Conservative	Wai Young	14,388	33.31	–0.57	$82,435.52
New Democratic	Sean McQuillan	8,015	18.56	+4.59	$4,489.04
Green	Judy Zaichkowsky	2,451	5.67	+3.10	$4,303.51
People's	Alain Deng	532	1.23	–	$11,771.39
Total valid votes/expense limit		43,194	99.01	–	$105,031.23
Total rejected ballots		431	0.99	+0.41	
Turnout		43,625	58.30	–4.90	
Eligible voters		74,826			
Liberal hold		Swing		–3.51	
Source: Elections Canada

2015 Canadian federal election: Vancouver South
Party	Candidate	Votes	%	±%	Expenditures
Liberal	Harjit Sajjan	21,773	48.81	+15.05	$161,402.16
Conservative	Wai Young	15,115	33.88	-8.54	$118,748.27
New Democratic	Amandeep Nijjar	6,230	13.97	-7.10	$63,954.79
Green	Elain Ng	1,149	2.58	+0.37	$5,232.68
Marxist–Leninist	Charles Boylan	178	0.40	–	–
Progressive Canadian	Raj Gupta	166	0.37	–	–
Total valid votes/Expense limit		44,611	100.00		$203,440.39
Total rejected ballots		259	0.58	–	
Turnout		44,870	64.04	–	
Eligible voters		70,062			
Liberal gain from Conservative		Swing		+11.80	
Source: Elections Canada

== Notes ==
29th Canadian Ministry (2015–2025) – Cabinet of Justin Trudeau
Cabinet posts (2)
Predecessor	Office	Successor
Jason Kenney	Minister of National Defence; November 4, 2015 – October 26, 2021	Anita Anand
Karina Gould	Minister of International Development; October 26, 2021 – July 26, 2023	Ahmed Hussen
