= Operation Mountain Thrust =

2006, NATO v. Taliban, Afghanistan

- Part of the War in Afghanistan (2001–2021)
Date	c. June 19, 2006 – c. July 31, 2006
Location	Kandahar, Helmand, Paktika, Zabul and Uruzgan provinces in Afghanistan
Result	Taliban victory

Belligerents
Coalition: Afghanistan; United Kingdom; United States; Canada; Australia; Romania; Netherlands; Czech Republic	Taliban al-Qaeda

Commanders and leaders
(United States) Benjamin Freakley (Canada) David Fraser (Islamic Republic of Afghanistan) Rahmatullah Raufi	(Taliban) Akhtar Usmani; Mullah Baqi Kakar; Mullah Mohammad Ibrahim Giwat (allegedly)

Strength
(Islamic Republic of Afghanistan) 3,500 security forces (United Kingdom) 3,300 (United States) 2,300 (Canada) 2,200 (Australia) 1,100 (Czech Republic) 120; Total: 11,000+	At least 2,500 insurgents

Casualties and losses
(Islamic Republic of Afghanistan) 107 killed, 43 captured (United Kingdom) 6 killed, 30 wounded (United States) 24 killed, 50 wounded (Canada) 4 killed, 30 wounded (Australia) 11 wounded (France) 2 killed, 1 wounded (Romania) 1 killed, 4 wounded 11 PMC killed Total: 155 killed 127+ wounded 43 captured	Estimated Heavy

Operation Mountain Thrust was a joint NATO and Afghan-led military operation in the War in Afghanistan. It involved more than 3,300 British troops, 2,300 U.S. troops, 2,200 Canadian troops, along with approximately 3,500 Afghan soldiers, supported by extensive air power. Its primary objective was to quell the ongoing Taliban insurgency in the south of the country.

The operation was launched in response to a significant Taliban spring offensive led by Mullah Dadullah in the provinces of Helmand and Kandahar, which had marked the most significant escalation of the war in Afghanistan since 2002. The operation was planned by Major General Benjamin Freakley. The strategy involved conducting search-and-destroy missions in the mountainous regions of Kandahar, Zabul, Uruzgan and Helmand.

The objective was to disrupt the Taliban's command structure and target their core leaders and fighters. The hope was that by doing so, it would dissuade less committed individuals from supporting the insurgents, thereby weakening their overall influence.

== Background ==
During June and July 2006, Afghanistan experienced some of the bloodiest clashes since the fall of the Taliban regime and Operation Anaconda. The Taliban demonstrated remarkable coordination in their attacks, managing to seize control of two districts in Helmand Province by the end of July, although these were swiftly reclaimed a few days later.

Throughout the fighting, the Taliban suffered heavy losses. The coalition itself also suffered casualties, with 155 soldiers killed and 43 Afghan policemen captured by the Taliban.

Tom Koenigs, the top U.N. official in Afghanistan, told the German news weekly Der Spiegel that the Taliban numbers of casualties do not reflect success. "The Taliban fighters reservoir is practically limitless," Koenigs told the magazine in an interview. "The movement will not be overcome by high casualty figures."

== The Operation and results ==
Due to the intense Taliban offensive and escalation of the war, Ian Hope, commander of the Canadian Princess Patricia's battalion, became increasingly concerned. On May 17, in one of their initial battles, half of the battalion encountered around 50 Taliban fighters in Zharey. The Canadians utilized AH-64 attack helicopters to repel the insurgents. However, as they pursued the Taliban through villages and narrow farm paths, they fell into a Taliban ambush. Four RPGs destroyed a Canadian light armored vehicle before the Taliban fighting positions were neutralized by a B-1 bomber.

Hope and his Canadian troops, along with U.S. special force teams in Kandahar, warned of a potential threat to the provincial capital of Kandahar City by the Taliban. Despite these concerns, Major General Benjamin Freakley remained focused on executing search-and-destroy missions in the mountains, a plan he had devised prior to arriving in Afghanistan to get NATO allies set up for operations in the country.

Canadian and U.S. special force teams on the ground disagreed with diverting resources to chase insurgents in the mountains while facing a significant Taliban attack near the provincial capitals of Kandahar and Helmand. However, the operation nonetheless proceeded as scheduled and lasted for six weeks in June and July. In the end, the operation did not manage to quell the Taliban insurgency. Coalition forces had cleared some remote districts and then pulled back. Benjamin Freakley later acknowledged that the operation did not achieve anything long-term. Control of the region was transferred from the Americans to other ISAF forces. Attacks continued and even intensified. On the first day that ISAF took control, August 1, a British patrol was hit by enemy fire in Helmand province; three soldiers were killed and one wounded. On the same day, 18 Taliban and one policeman were killed in an anti-Taliban coalition operation in the same province and 15 Afghan policemen were captured when they surrendered in Zabul province while a Taliban force was preparing to attack their police post. Also two days later there were several incidents in and around Kandahar, including a suicide bombing which killed 21 civilians. In the other attacks in and around Kandahar, four Canadian soldiers were killed and ten were wounded.

== Known Encounters ==
- May 16–17, 2006 Musa Qala, Helmand
- May 19–20, 2006 Kajaki, Helmand
- May 21–22, 2006 Panjwayi, Kandahar (see Battle of Panjwaii)
- May 23–24, 2006 Tarin Kowt, Uruzgan
- May 26–27, 2006 Sak Qala, Helmand
- May 29–30, 2006 Kajaki, Helmand
- June 10–11, 2006 Arghandab, Zabul
- June 10–11, 2006 Deh Rawood, Uruzgan
- June 14–15, 2006 Shah joy, Zabul
- June 15–16, 2006 ?, Paktika
- June 16–17, 2006 Musa Qala, Helmand
- June 23–25, 2006 Operation Kaika, near Kandahar
- June 25–26, 2006 Zharie, Kandahar,
- June 25–26, 2006 Tarin Kowt, Uruzgan,
- June 27–28, 2006 Musa Qala, Helmand
- July 10–11, 2006 Tarin Kowt, Uruzgan

== See also ==
- Siege of Sangin
- Coalition combat operations in Afghanistan in 2006
- Operation Enduring Freedom
- Taliban insurgency

== Bibliography ==
- Malkasian, Carter (2021). The American War in Afghanistan: A History. Oxford University Press. ISBN 978-0-19-755077-9.
