= Operation Falcon Summit =

2006 Canadian-led operation in Afghanistan

- Part of the War in Afghanistan (2001–2021); Battle of Panjwaii
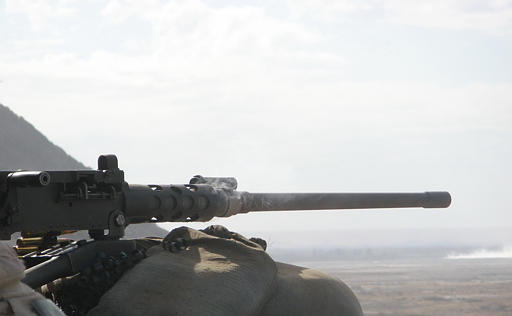
- A Canadian .50 calibre machine gun fires on Taliban fighters while dust rises in the background
Date	December 15, 2006 – January 2007
Location	Panjwaii district, Kandahar province, Afghanistan
Result	NATO victory Taliban retreated out of the area

Belligerents
Canada; United Kingdom; Islamic Republic of Afghanistan; Estonia; Denmark	(Afghanistan) Taliban

Commanders and leaders
(Canada) Tim Grant (Canada) Omer Lavoie	Local commanders

Strength
(Canada) 2,000	900 insurgents

Operation Falcon Summit (Pashto: Baaz Tsuka) was a Canadian-led operation in the Battle of Panjwaii and, on a larger scale, in the War in Afghanistan.

NATO forces launched the operation on December 15, 2006, with the intention of expelling Taliban fighters from the Panjawi and Zhari districts of Kandahar.

Canadian troops had been fighting with Taliban fighters in the area for several months. Although the operation was under British command, the majority of movements and elements on the ground were Canadians operating from forward operating bases set up in the district during the fighting of Operation Mountain Thrust and Operation Medusa.

== Information campaign ==
Early on December 15, NATO aircraft attacked a Taliban command post in the area, using laser-guided bombs, rockets, and fuel-air explosives to blast apart the makeshift fortress the Taliban had constructed out of stone, concrete, and sheet metal. The same day, aircraft began dropping three sets of leaflets over the region, the first warning the population of the impending conflict, the next a plea for locals to turn their backs on the Taliban and support NATO, and the third consisting of an image of a Taliban fighter with a large X through it to warn Taliban fighters to either leave the area, or face NATO.

=== Landmine accident ===
During the days prior to the operation, Canadian soldiers held several meetings with tribal elders to discuss potential reconstruction efforts and to persuade locals to help support NATO in keeping the Taliban out of the area after the Taliban had been removed. While en route to one of these meetings (or shuras in Pashto) a Canadian soldier from the Royal 22^{e} Régiment, the "Van Doos", out of Quebec, stepped on a landmine. The soldier, Private Frederic Couture suffered severe but non-life-threatening injuries and was medivac'd to a coalition hospital where he was stabilized.

The landmine had been planted the night before by two Taliban operatives, who were spotted, shot, and killed by Canadian soldiers. Engineers then came to clear the area of landmines, but they missed the one that Couture set off. The mine attack was the first casualty of the operation.

== Preparations for battle ==
On December 14 in the Helmand province there was increased activity around British bases prior to the announcement of the operation. Soldiers were seen packing large amounts of equipment and ammunition for a long stay outside the wire, and troops began moving out towards the area of operations.

Although the Canadian commanders in Afghanistan did not officially announce that the Canadian Forces in the area would take part in the operation until the information campaign had been all but completed, Canadian officers gave very obvious hints that Canadians would be active participants. British commanders also stated prior to this that if need be Canadian personnel would be called upon for the operation.

Back at the Canadian Forward Operating Bases in the Panjwaii District, soldiers could be seen preparing for battle. Troops were gathering ammunition and web-gear; and last minute checks were being conducted on Canadian armored vehicles such as the LAV III and Leopard C2 tanks.

== Offensive operations ==
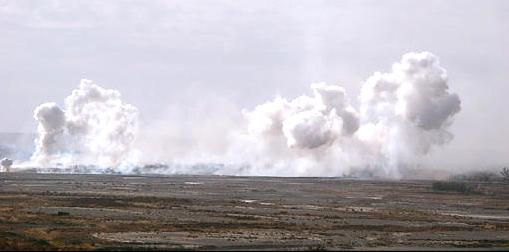
Smoke rises as a result of Canadian tank and artillery fire in Panjwaii

On December 19, the offensive operations of Falcon Summit began. A massive barrage of Canadian artillery and tank fire rained down on Taliban positions in the area of operations which killed around 60 Taliban. The artillery barrage lasted for 45 minutes and was supported by heavy machine gun fire from Canadian .50-calibre guns.

Shortly after the barrage ended, Canadian armoured convoys left the "protection" of being behind the wire and headed out into the area of operations and set up perimeters without a single shot being fired. The Canadians stationed themselves around the village of Howz-e Madad and are said to be on a "soft knock" approach with the villagers to help gain support.

Over the next few days, NATO forces secured several more objective towns with very little resistance from Taliban fighters. Canadian Leopard C2 tanks were requested for support by the head of the Afghan National Army (ANA), but were turned down due to the high number of anti-tank mines littering the ground in the area where the tanks would have been used. Commanders believed that the lack of resistance they encountered was due to the bombardment of leaflets dropped during the information campaign.

Near the village of Howz-e Madad was a 10-square-kilometre area full of mud-walled fortresses and 900 surrounded Taliban fighters. Canadian infantry and armour surrounded the area, which was ideal for the Taliban's style of attacks. The complex build of the area the fighters were held up in made it nearly impossible to escape from, and to the east of the complex was a road built by the Canadians after Operation Medusa, which ran along the Arghandab River, which made it impossible for any Taliban to escape using the road. Ten kilometres to the south of Howz-e Madad was a line of American soldiers, and to the west were more British soldiers making this a truly combined effort by the three nations to protect the Afghan people living nearby and bring down the Taliban.

After 48 hours passed, the Taliban fired. Two rockets flew past C Company just south of Howz-e Madad. This was responded to by a burst of machine-gun fire from the Afghan National Army, but nobody on either side of the skirmish took any casualties.

After the new year began, on January 5, a 45-minute firefight between about 20 members of the Royal 22^{e} Regiment and a force of Taliban fighters about half the size. Small arms including automatic rifle and machine gun fire, rocket propelled grenades and mortars were used against the Canadians. The Van Doos were conducting operations in the village of Lacookhal, which is just south of Howz-e Madad, looking for arms caches and Taliban fighters when the enemy force opened fire. By the time the fire ceased, at least two of the Taliban fighters had been killed with no Canadian or ANA casualties.

The next day, Canadian light infantry forces, backed by U.S. helicopter gunships, swept into the mud fortresses and routed out the remaining Taliban, most of whom fled.
