= 2006 Taliban offensive =

Military offensive by the Taliban in Afghanistan

- Part of the War in Afghanistan (2001–2021)
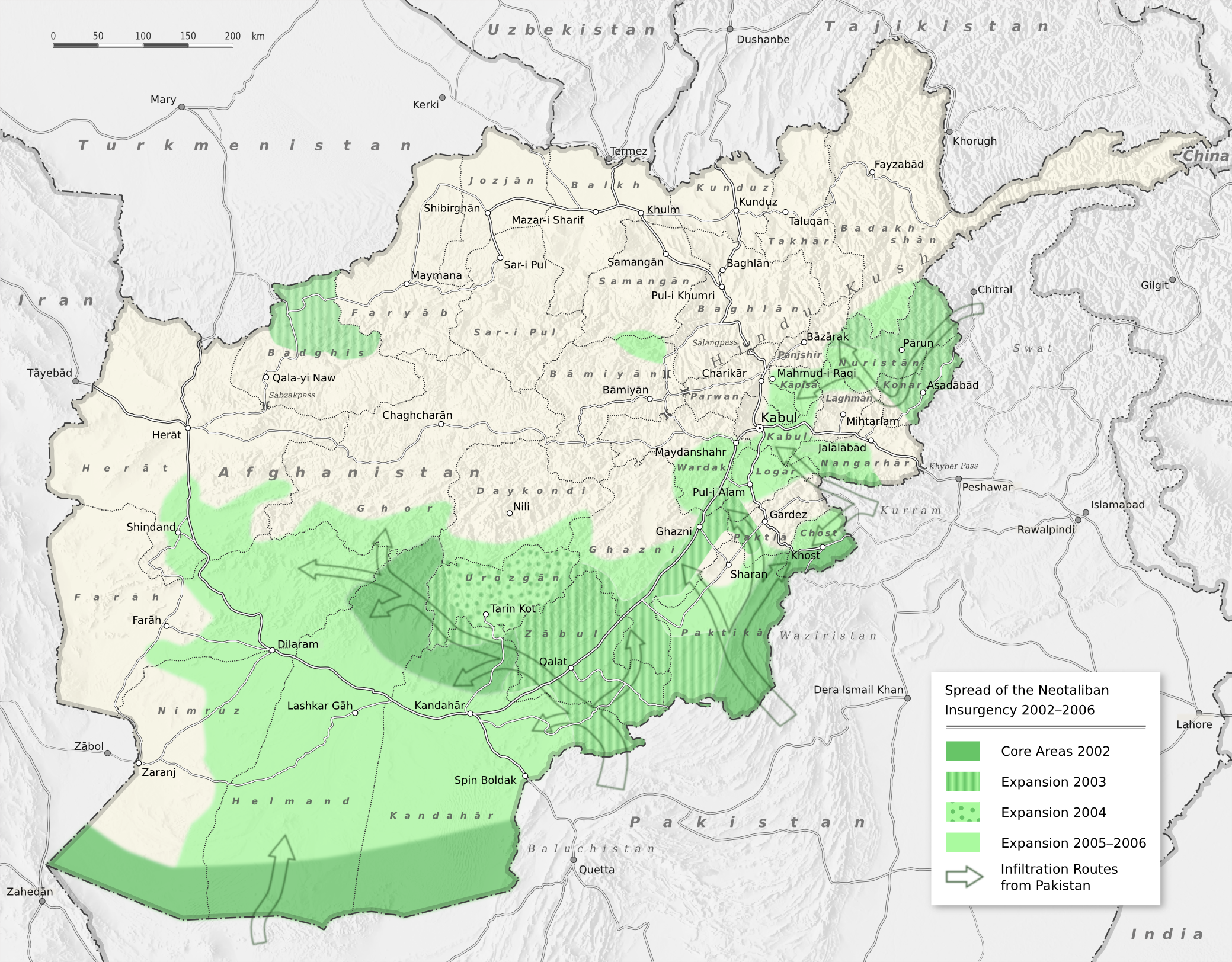
- Map depicting the spread of the Taliban insurgency. Areas where the Taliban established a presence in 2005–2006 are in light green.
Date	April 14 – 16 September 2006
Location	Kandahar, Helmand, Zabul, Uruzgan
Result	Taliban victory

Belligerents
(Afghanistan) Islamic Republic of Afghanistan Coalition: United Kingdom; Canada; United States; Netherlands; Denmark; Australia	(Afghanistan) Taliban

Commanders and leaders
(United Kingdom) David Richards (United Kingdom) Ed Butler (Canada) David Fraser (United States) Benjamin Freakley (Islamic Republic of Afghanistan) Bismillah Khan (Islamic Republic of Afghanistan) Rahmatullah Raufi	(Afghanistan) Mullah Dadullah (Afghanistan) Mullah Aktar Osmani (Afghanistan) Mullah Baradar (Afghanistan) Mullah Obaidullah

The 2006 Taliban offensive was a major military offensive launched by the Taliban in southern Afghanistan in the spring of 2006. The offensive was planned to unfold on three main fronts concentrated in the provinces of Helmand and Kandahar: the first front was to target northern Helmand, focusing on the districts of Sangin, Nowzad, and Kajaki. The second front aimed at southern Helmand, with a focus on the districts of Garmser and Nawa. The third, and most important, would be western Kandahar, targeting the districts of Maiwand, Zharey, and Panjwayi.

The offensive sparked a resurgence of the Taliban insurgency and marked the most significant escalation of the war in Afghanistan since the Taliban regime was overthrown in 2001. It led to the Taliban gaining control over a considerable amount of territory in the provinces of Helmand, Kandahar, Zabul, Uruzgan, Farah, and Ghazni by the year's end, in which the Taliban established their own administration based on Islamic law, operating independently from the Afghan government.

== Background ==
At the end of 2001, the Taliban regime was eliminated, but the movement continued to pose a threat to the newly established US-backed Afghan government. Many Taliban fighters and most of its leadership escaped into Pakistan, some of them by being directly airlifted from the northern city of Kunduz by the Pakistani Air Force. This set the stage for a resurgence of Taliban activity with direct support from Pakistan. The Haqqani network, a Taliban affiliated Islamist group centered around the family of Jalaluddin Haqqani, began to carry out small-scale operations almost immediately. By the end of 2002, the Taliban had regrouped, established training camps across Pakistan, and made Quetta their operational hub, forming what became known as the Quetta Shura Taliban (QST). Mullah Omar served as the spiritual leader of the QST, while the strategy was crafted by two Taliban councils: the leadership council and the consultative council.

Between 2002 and 2005, Afghanistan appeared relatively calm, but underlying tribal tensions and flawed US military actions led to a resurgence of Taliban support in rural areas. Kandahar, where the Taliban had been founded in the 1990s, became a focal point for their comeback. The new Afghan government, led by President Hamid Karzai, struggled to deliver basic services in rural areas. It faced systemic issues like fragmented administrative structures and could not attract or maintain skilled professionals effectively. By 2005, only 6% of Afghans had access to electricity. A study by the World Bank found that government aid primarily benefitted the urban elite, leading to widespread frustration and resentment among rural communities. Moreover, the tribes that had wielded political power under Taliban rule—Ishakzai, Noorzai, and Ghilzai—were largely excluded from the new administration, further complicating reconciliation between the tribes and Karzai's administration.

In June 2002, Lieutenant General Dan McNeill, commander of XVIII Airborne Corps, took charge of combat operations for the 8,000 US troops stationed in Afghanistan. The US prioritized counterterrorism efforts and refrained from interfering in local tribal matters. Their main focus was to track down and capture leaders of the Taliban and Al-Qaeda, with Osama bin Laden being their top target. US special forces were eager to act on any leads they received, sometimes overlooking thorough intelligence gathering. In February 2002, special forces stationed in Kandahar carried out a nighttime raid on compounds in Uruzgan, believing them to be Al-Qaeda hideouts based on local intelligence. However the "targets" turned out to be allies of President Hamid Karzai, and the so-called "intelligence sources" turned out to have been their tribal rivals. This resulted in the death of 16 people as a result of hasty actions by US forces based on faulty intelligence.

By 2004, the Taliban had established communication routes into Afghanistan from Pakistan and strengthened their control over mountainous regions bordering Kandahar, Zabul, and Uruzgan. Violence surged In the south as the Taliban mobilized more fighters from Pakistan. The Taliban brought Iraqi insurgents into the tribal areas of Pakistan to learn about the newest insurgency tactics. This resulted in the adoption of IED attacks and suicide bombings, which were previously uncommon in Afghanistan. Suicide bombings had not been used during the Soviet-Afghan War, but Mullah Omar sanctioned these extreme measures, viewing them as necessary for jihad. Afghan police struggled to maintain security in rural areas, often arriving late when communities sought protection. With the government unable to safeguard them, rural areas became safe havens for the Taliban. Locals had no choice but to support the insurgents due to the lack of protection provided by the government.

Further weakening the government's ability to defend the south, there was an initiative to disarm the Afghan tribal militias to facilitate the creation of a new Afghan National Army (ANA). This effort, known as the Disarmament, Demobilization, and Reintegration Program (DDR), was carried out by the United States, the United Nations, and Japan. As a result, militia numbers decreased from 100,000 to 8,000 by 2005. President Karzai supported the disarmament, recognizing that it would undermine his political rivals.

In early 2006, Afghan analysts, led by the director of the National Directorate of Security (NDS), conducted a study that showed that the Taliban was much more sophisticated than generally perceived. Amrullah Saleh, head of the Afghan National Directorate of Security, believed the Taliban had devised a comprehensive strategy based on undermining the democratic process, persuading key Pashtun tribes in southern Afghanistan such as the Noorzai, Popalzai, Alikozai, and Ishakzai to switch sides, and ultimately to establish a parallel government in rural villages in the south.

== ISAF expansion ==
NATO allies, initially supporting the US after the 9/11 attacks, got more and more involved in Afghanistan over the following years. The US Secretary of Defense, Donald Rumsfeld, believed that the US had become too deeply engaged in Afghanistan, and having NATO take over security responsibilities was seen as the solution. On August 9, 2003, NATO took over the International Security Assistance Force (ISAF) mission, initially confined to Kabul. In October 2003, a UN Security Council Resolution expanded ISAF's mandate to operate beyond the capital, eventually leading to the deployment of NATO forces in southern Afghanistan in 2006.

By 2004, thirteen Provincial Reconstruction Teams (PRT) had been established in northern and southern Afghanistan. These areas, dominated by non-Pashtun populations and with strong Northern Alliance influence, faced no major security threats. However, as the ISAF was next to expand into the Pashtun-dominated south, it presented more significant challenges for the mission.

On December 8, 2005, NATO completed its plan for deploying coalition forces in southern Afghanistan. The Canadians were tasked with Kandahar, the British with Helmand, the Dutch and Australians with Uruzgan, and the Romanians with Kabul. These governments and their military leaders underestimated the severity of the situation. They expected only a few minor skirmishes, not prolonged combat.

In December 2005, British advance teams arrived in Helmand and reported difficulties with the local governor, Sher Mohammad Akhundzada. This led to the most significant foreign infringement in Afghan politics during the whole war as the British lobbied President Karzai to replace Akhundzada with the more Western-oriented Mohammed Daoud. Karzai agreed, but the move left lasting tension. On January 17, Martin Howard, from the Ministry of Defense, testified to the House of Commons Defence Committee. He stated that the violence in Helmand consisted mainly of isolated incidents rather than a widespread campaign, contrasting it with the situation in Iraq. Howard also said that there was "no evidence that the population is turning back to the Taliban."

The Canadian deployment faced difficulties from the start. Glyn Berry, the director of the Canadian PRT, was killed in a suicide attack in Kandahar City on January 15, 2006. In February, around 2,000 troops from the Canadian Task Force Orion were deployed in Kandahar Province for the security handover. The new Canadian force included a combat battalion with three mechanized companies and a PRT. They planned to position their three companies in forward operating bases: one in the northern martello, one in Zharey, and one in Spin Boldak.

== Initial moves ==
The Taliban's military leadership was led by Mullah Akhtar Mohammad Osmani, Mullah Omar's trusted deputy, and Mullah Dadullah. Dadullah had returned to the southern theater after orchestrating suicide bombings in Kabul in 2003. In late 2005, Dadullah deployed larger groups of fighters into Kandahar. These groups traveled through various routes: some came up from Pakistan through the red desert south of Panjwayi, while others descended from the Hindu Kush foothills in Uruzgan and Helmand, or moved west from Zabul. In November and December 2005, fighters from Pakistan gathered in Maiwand District, leading to increased skirmishes and IED attacks. The police were overwhelmed by these threats, with only about 35-50 officers stationed in Zharey, Panjwayi, and Maiwand respectively.

In early 2006, Mullah Omar instructed his deputies, Mullah Baradar and Mullah Obaidullah, to start making their move. Mullah Dadullah headed to northern Helmand and began exerting influence over an area inhabited by around 100,000 Afghans spread across five districts: Baghran, Nowzad, Sangin, Musa Qala, and Kajaki. Dadullah spent several months in northern Helmand orchestrating operations and strengthening the Taliban's presence. "His return was like the arrival of rain after five years of drought," said a local commander. The US embassy warned about the strengthening of the insurgency, pointing out that the Taliban had launched simultaneous attacks against Nowzad, Sangin and Musa Qala in February. The Taliban may have chosen to make their move at this time because the transition of security duties to the ISAF, which was to be completed by July 1, was seen as evidence that the American military's presence in Afghanistan would not sustained long-term.

The defense against the insurgent attacks relied heavily on the Afghan police forces since the Afghan army was still too small to handle the situation. In Helmand, there were around 1,700 police units, while Kandahar had 1,900. Many of these forces were stationed in urban areas and struggled to maintain control in rural regions. The Afghan police were poorly trained and poorly equipped, with only 15% possessing functional Kalashnikov assault rifles. Most lacked motivation, having joined primarily for the salary rather than out of a sense of duty. While there were a few exceptions, such as Abdul Razziq's border police forces in Spin Boldak and Naqib Alikozai's police forces in Arghandab, they were not representative of the overall situation.

By spring, the Taliban moved into Panjwayi south of the Arghandab River, aiming to establish themselves with the support of sympathetic Noorzai and Ghilzai tribes. However, these tribes, unwilling to see conflict erupt in their villages, told the Taliban to go elsewhere. Accepting the request, the Taliban moved into Zharey in April and launched attacks on police forces, engaging in several clashes throughout the month. On April 30, an ANA convoy was struck by an IED while traveling on the highway near Gereshk. The explosion resulted in the deaths of four Afghan soldiers. Stuart Tootal, commander of the 3rd Battalion, Parachute Regiment described the aftermath as he saw "[t]he grisly residue of the body parts of the dead [as they were] lifted off the back of an ANA pick-up truck."

In May, Mullah Dadullah stated in an interview with Al-Jazeera that their ultimate goal was to capture the provincial capitals of Lashkhar Gar and Kandahar City, and use these cities as a launching point to liberate the remainder of Afghanistan. Dadullah could probably muster around a total of 4,000 fighters in Helmand and Kandahar.

== Platoon house strategy ==
The escalating situation would ultimately result in British troops being deployed into the district centers of Sangin, Nowzad, and Musa Qala. This marked the beginning of what came to be known as the "platoon house strategy." British forces found themselves stationed in remote outposts across northern Helmand, facing sustained and intense Taliban attacks. These outposts remained under siege for extended periods. A "district center" served as the administrative hub of a district, housing government offices, including those of the district governor and police chief. A bazaar was also located in the district center, but only a tiny number of people actually lived there. Most of the bazaar's shopkeepers and business owners lived in the surrounding villages. Thus, controlling the district center did not equate to control over the people who frequented it.

In April, a new British unit, the Helmand Task Force, was deployed to tackle the Taliban threat. The main combat force was the 16th Air Assault Brigade, primarily the 3rd Battalion of the Parachute Regiment, stationed at Camp Bastion, which was still under construction. The task force consisted of 3,300 personnel, but only a third were combat-ready troops. In late May, British forces conducted several rescue missions but found little upon landing. This led Brigadier Ed Butler to believe that the UK task force needed to establish a presence in the north. By the end of May, British platoon houses were set up in Musa Qala and Nowzad district centers. The British troops worked alongside the local police, though their effectiveness was described as "pretty much a joke really."

=== Siege of Sangin ===
Sangin, with a population of 30,000, held significant importance as a trading hub, known for its opium market. Control over Sangin was strategically important for the Taliban because it facilitated the transportation of poppy from north to south, towards Maiwand and Pakistan, and allowed them to cut off government garrisons.

Unlike Musa Qala, where attacking Taliban forces hailed mostly from neighboring districts, Sangin insurgents were predominantly locals. This stemmed from internal tribal tensions that the Taliban exploited to stoke resistance against the government. The town's population mainly comprised two major tribes: the Alikozai and the Ishakzai. Since 2001, the Alikozai tribe held influential positions, including the district governorship and key administrative roles. Conversely, the Ishakzai tribe faced mistreatment, particularly from Dad Mohammed, an Alikozai leader who served as the head of the Afghan secret police in Sangin. Exploiting their government positions, the Alikozai levied taxes, harassed and stole from the Ishakzai. Consequently, when Dadullah initiated his attack, the Ishakzai naturally sided with the Taliban. By mid-June 2006, Sangin was largely under insurgent control.

On June 19, Gul Mohammed Khan, the former district governor and brother of Dad Mohammed, was killed by the Taliban. The next day, when the family went to retrieve his body, they too were ambushed by the Taliban, resulting in the deaths of 30 more. Dad Mohammed urgently requested evacuation for his family, leading to President Karzai requesting British assistance. Four Chinook transport helicopters were dispatched, carrying the 3rd Battalion of the Parachute Regiment to Sangin. After evacuating Dad Mohammed's family, ninety men from A Company remained in Sangin to reinforce security, alongside twenty Afghan police officers. The provincial governor, Mohammed Daoud, assured that fifty additional policemen would arrive within three days to relieve A Company. The promised reinforcements never materialized, however.

On June 21, local elders, wary of the British presence, asked them to leave Sangin. That night, Taliban insurgents, hiding in the Bazaar's shops and alleys attacked the British in the governor's compound with mortars, assault rifles, and RPGs. On July 1, around thirty insurgents launched a two-pronged assault, supported by rocket fire. The paratroopers' heavy machine guns and air support from Apache gunships and A-10 attack aircraft repelled the attackers. The British suffered eight casualties. Over the next week, an average of five attacks per day occurred, and the paratroopers found themselves besieged in a never-ending battle to save the governor's compound.

=== Siege of Musa Qala ===
On June 14, the British Pathfinder Platoon, led by Major Nick Wight-Boycott, arrived in Musa Qala. Comprising 25 men, the Pathfinder Platoon specialized in reconnaissance, making them an unconventional choice for garrison duties. However, with resources stretched thin, they were the only available unit for the task. Musa Qala was strategically positioned at the intersection of two wadis, making it vital for transportation. Positioned along the route connecting Baghran to the Sangin valley, the district center sat between two bustling bazaars in the heart of town. The police compound housed about eighty officers, with only a quarter of them wearing uniforms, making it difficult to distinguish them from the Taliban insurgents. In May, Musa Qala faced several Taliban attacks, indicating its strategic importance to the insurgents. Despite this, the Taliban hesitated to launch another attack unless they could be sure of success due to the lack of support from the local population.

The police chief of Musa Qala, Abdul Wulley, earned the nickname "Coco" from the British. He had a complex history, having fought for the mujahideen against the Soviets and later for the Taliban. Despite his controversial past, Wulley proved invaluable to the British forces. He had deep insights into Taliban movements and regularly provided intelligence on insurgent activities. Sadly, there were often communication challenges. In one instance, the British tried to warn the Americans not to pass through Musa Qala, as they "would certainly get ambushed," but the message didn't get through in time. As predicted, the Americans were attacked by the insurgents, leading to a three-hour firefight until air support could be called in. One American soldier was wounded in the skirmish.

Like other Platoon houses, Musa Qala relied on helicopters for resupply, presenting significant challenges due to frequent enemy fire. During one mission to extract a serious casualty, Royal Marine pilot Major Mark Hammond faced intense insurgent fire as they approached Musa Qala. Heavy machine guns and RPGs targeted their helicopter, with one RPG narrowly missing. The Taliban launched mortar bombs onto the landing site. In response, the Chinook crew returned fire with their onboard machine guns, but the mission had to be aborted due to the intensity of the enemy fire. Hours later, the Chinook returned escorted by Apache gunships armed with Hellfire missiles and cannons. The Apaches unleashed continuous fire to suppress enemy activity as the Chinook executed the extraction. Additionally, an American A-10 Warthog joined the fray, unleashing its 30mm Gatling gun, which could fire 3,900 shells per minute. The combined firepower effectively neutralized the enemy, ensuring the safe evacuation of the casualty.

Recognizing the urgent need for reinforcements, RC-South agreed to deploy a squadron of Danish reconnaissance troops to relieve Musa Qala. On July 26, the Danish armored vehicles fought their way into the Musa Qala district center, but the Pathfinders found themselves unable to fight their way out.

=== Southern front ===
In June, Dadullah initiated a second front by launching an offensive in the southern region of Helmand. About 500 Taliban fighters seized control of the district center of Garmser. The British forces eventually regained control and fortified the Garmser district center, turning it into yet another besieged outpost encircled by Taliban insurgents. The only part of Helmand under full government control was the central core of Lashkar Gah and Gereshk.

== Kandahar offensive ==
Unlike the British, who had not solidified their presence before the Taliban offensive, Canadian forces had already established themselves in Kandahar. Under the command of Brigadier-General David Fraser, Task Force Kandahar arrived in early February with 2,200 soldiers. Only 850 of them from the 1st Battalion, Princess Patricia's Canadian Light Infantry, were designated for combat operations. Garrisons were established in Spin Boldak and Kandahar City. Due to the limited number of soldiers and the vast area to cover, Fraser opted for a flexible approach to disrupt enemy activity. He had not expected a large-scale Taliban offensive to engulf the entire province.

In mid-April, the Taliban launched attacks in Kandahar, targeting police posts, ambushing Canadian patrols, and planting IEDs on key roads. A Canadian light armored vehicle was struck by two rocket-propelled grenades on April 14 after having been sent to rescue a group of Afghan soldiers and police officers who had been ambushed by the insurgents. The situation escalated into a prolonged firefight that lasted all afternoon. American Apache attack helicopters were called in to engage the roughly 20 Taliban fighters, who retreated into Sansegar.

Dadullah's front-line commander was Mullah Abdul Manan, a Hotak tribesman from Sansegar. The main focus of their efforts was on the populous and fertile districts of Zharey and Panjwayi, which were close to Kandahar City. The police forces remained confined to their district centers and were unable to respond effectively. Massoum Khan, an Alizai and one of the police officers in Zharey, recalled the chaotic situation: "I was here with ten men when the Taliban attacked. The people had no weapons to defend themselves. There were only 45 police in the district. No militia. No Afghan national army."

The Taliban seized control of several villages, including Zangabad, Taloqan, and Sangesar, and then launched assaults on the district centers and police headquarters. Dadullah strategically positioned himself in Zharey and orchestrated attacks across western Kandahar. Tragically, on May 17, Nichola Goddard was killed while fighting Taliban insurgents in Panjwayi, becoming the first Canadian woman to be killed in action since World War II. Prime Minister Stephen Harper acknowledged Goddard's sacrifice: "Capt. Goddard died while helping to bring peace, stability and democracy to a troubled region of the world. She, and the other men and women who serve in Afghanistan, are involved in a difficult and dangerous mission."

Canadian forces responded to the Taliban's buildup by launching attacks on their strongholds in Bayanzi and Payendi, located in the Pashmul area of Zharey. These attacks involved two Canadian infantry companies and a small ANA battalion. Although the Canadians successfully captured their objectives, they quickly withdrew from Zharey and Panjwayi, allowing the districts to fall back under insurgent control. The Canadians were spread thin because they were ordered to assist with Operation Mountain Thrust, a joint operation with American, British, Dutch, and Danish forces aimed at dislodging the Taliban from their mountain hideouts in Zabul, Uruzgan, Kandahar, and Helmand provinces.

=== Abdul Razziq's expedition ===
Governor Asadullah Khalid, frustrated with Canadian setbacks, started seeking alternative approaches to deal with the insurgents. He felt there were sufficient troops and that the Canadians were overly cautious. In August, he turned to Abdul Razziq, a controversial border police commander in Spin Boldak. Razziq had a personal vendetta: his father and uncle were killed by a Taliban member of the rival Noorzai tribe in 1994. Seeking revenge, Razziq viciously targeted both the Noorzai tribesmen and the Taliban members.

Razziq and the Noorzai had already fought out bloody tribal feuds around Spin Boldak. In 2004, the Noorzai killed Razziq's brother. Razziq caught the Assassin in March 2006 and executed him, in addition to 15 fellow Noorzai tribesmen. Many Noorzai tribesmen aligned themselves with the Taliban when Dadullah launched his offensive. Khalid sent Razziq to western Kandahar to deal with the Taliban insurgents. This led him into Panjwayi, which was Noorzai territory. Rumors swiftly started spreading that Razziq was abducting Noorzai women and that he had come to kill every Noorzai he could find. This resulted in hundreds of Noorzai tribesmen pouring in from all over the province to fight, greatly strengthening the Taliban presence.

Worried that Razziq's actions were pushing young Noorzai tribesmen towards the Taliban, General Mir Wais hurried to Sperwan ahead of Razziq. Upon Razziq's arrival, Mir Wais told him to move on and not enter Sperwan. As they conversed, an angry mob of Noorzai tribesmen showed up, prepared for battle. Mir Wais tried to calm them down, explaining that Razziq was just passing through to Taloqan and Zangabad. However, they remained skeptical, insisting that Razziq had come to oppress them. Mir Wais eventually convinced Razziq that there were no Taliban insurgents in Sperwan. Razziq then headed westward and fought a few battles before returning to Spin Boldak. His mission had failed miserably, providing the Taliban with a significant propaganda victory by claiming that the entire Noorzai tribe had united with them against the evil Razziq.

== Operation Medusa ==
By August 19, 2006, it seemed that Taliban forces in Zharey and Panjwayi were gearing up for an attack on Kandahar City. Hundreds of Taliban fighters launched an assault on the Panjwayi bazaar and district center, defended by a Canadian company. The Canadians managed to fend off the insurgents, preventing them from infiltrating the bazaar. The Canadians devised Operation Medusa to clear the insurgents out of Zharey district and prevent them from being able to launch further attacks.

Operation Medusa began on September 2, following airstrikes to soften the targets. Two Canadian companies initiated the attack on Pashmul from the south, crossing the Arghandab River and engaging with well-fortified Taliban fighters. The initial assault was met with heavy resistance, as 257 Taliban fighters launched counterattacks from their entrenched positions. On September 4, an accident occurred when US aircraft mistakenly fired on a Canadian platoon, resulting in the friendly fire death of one soldier. The soldiers were reportedly in the process of organizing and positioning themselves when they were hit. NATO later clarified that the aircraft had engaged friendly forces during a strafing run, using cannons.

Taliban fighters tried to divert the attention of the ISAF coalition by attacking a forward operating base (FOB) in Shah Wali Kot. 80 Taliban fighters assaulted FOB Martello, but the attempt ended up in failure as the Canadian and Dutch forces repelled them without suffering any casualties. Sixty new Afghan army commandos, backed by US special forces teams, advanced from the south, encountering heavy resistance near a ridge overlooking several villages of Pashmul. As they approached, the Taliban launched an attack from three sides using RPGs and small arms. The Afghan commandos and American special forces teams engaged in a fierce battle for 20 minutes, but had to retreat due to dwindling ammunition supplies. After being resupplied by helicopters, Afghan commandos, and US special forces teams launched another assault on the ridge on September 5. This time, they received close air support, which helped them secure the position successfully. During the night, the Taliban attempted a counterattack but were met with overwhelming firepower, resulting in the deaths of four insurgents. The following day, they tried a second time but were again forced to retreat as the American forces responded with heavy artillery strikes and airstrikes.

On September 6, the Canadians changed their approach, moving northward with an infantry company advancing south from Highway One. They methodically pushed through enemy defenses, dismantling bunkers and fire trenches along the way. ISAF forces hindered insurgent resupply efforts with targeted airstrikes and artillery fire, disrupting their command and control. The Canadians and their allies breached the enemy's defenses and joined forces with the invasion force from the south, then began pushing westward.

Canadian, American, and Afghan troops made progress from three directions, successfully clearing the area of enemy fighters by September 17. One Taliban fighter expressed admiration for the Canadians: "It was very strong fighting for seventeen days. It shook the whole world. This shows that the Canadians are strong fighters and that we fought strongly against them." Six Canadians and over 300 Taliban fighters were killed during Operation Medusa. Media reported 40 civilian casualties, but this is probably an underestimation, as the rules of close air support had been loose, and had allowed Canadian and American units to carry out airstrikes against compounds in which women and children were likely hiding.

== Aftermath ==
Following the 2006 offensive, the Taliban gained control over substantial territory in southern Afghanistan. They set up their own administration, distinct from the Kabul government, bringing stability and delivering tangible goods to villages. Additionally, they fostered a sense of religious unity, distinct from the Tribal system's chaos.

Taliban ambushes on Canadian troops in Pashmul showed that Operation Medusa had failed to establish long-term government control over Panjwayi and Zharey. In mid-December 2006, the Canadians launched Operation Baaz Tzuka to clear Taliban cells from Taloqan and the Panjwayi Peninsula. However, the Taliban fighters did not defend their ground and instead merged into the populations in nearby villages. This was part of a significant shift in the insurgent's tactics after their defeat in Operation Medusa. They started operating in small groups, blending in with locals and hiding in family compounds and mosques. They also scattered weapon caches around the countryside, allowing them to move about without being identified as combatants. Taliban fighters could then arm themselves from these caches and launch attacks on ISAF forces.

The Taliban's strength surged significantly. Around mid-2006, they might have had about 12,000 fighters at most. By 2009, their numbers ranged from 25,000 to 46,000. Their territorial gains allowed them to recruit directly from the villages they controlled. They started conducting short training sessions in these areas, sometimes organized by the Pakistani intelligence agency, ISI. The Taliban became more skilled in using IEDs, which became their preferred weapon due to their effectiveness and not needing to indoctrinate suicide bombers.

In areas under their control, the Taliban established their own governance structure, appointing provincial and district governors and implementing a justice system based on Islamic law. Mohammed Issa, the Taliban governor of Kandahar, explained the Taliban's justice system in a 2010 interview:

In those areas the Islamic Emirate authority completely exists. . . . An independent commission of judges is active. . . . We review petitions and resolve cases in courts from rural areas that otherwise have to send petitions and issues of rights to the provincial center. . . . In Kandahar City, the government courts stand empty and its judges that have been appointed in Kabul do not have the boldness to work here. After that experience again and again, people now understand that to solve their problems the only recourse is the Islamic Emirate Court because their obstacles are solved very quickly through Islamic law.

Taliban rule was characterized by efficiency, but also harshness. They adhered to a code of conduct called the "layeha," which outlined rules for various aspects of governance, including recruitment, administration, handling of prisoners, financial matters, accountability, and personal conduct. Those who betrayed the Taliban were not given second chances. They banned secular education and targeted aid organizations, even if their work benefitted locals. Dadullah executed Afghans suspected of collaborating with the government, often displaying their bodies in public places. Some Taliban members criticized Dadullah, expressing doubt that his conduct aligned with Islamic teachings.

== See also ==
- 2021 Taliban offensive

== Bibliography ==
- Forsberg, Carl (2009). The Taliban's Campaign for Kandahar. Institute for the Study of War.
- Bishop, Patrick (2007). Three Para. HarperPress. ISBN 978-0-00-725778-2.
- Farrell, Theo (7 September 2017). Unwinnable: Britain's War in Afghanistan. Random House. ISBN 978-1-4735-2240-4.
- Malkasian, Carter (2021). The American War in Afghanistan: A History. Oxford University Press. ISBN 978-0-19-755077-9.
- Maley, William (3 November 2020). The Afghanistan Wars. Bloomsbury Publishing. ISBN 978-1-352-01101-2.
