= Battle of Panjwaii =

2006 battle during the War in Afghanistan

- Part of the War in Afghanistan (2001–2021)
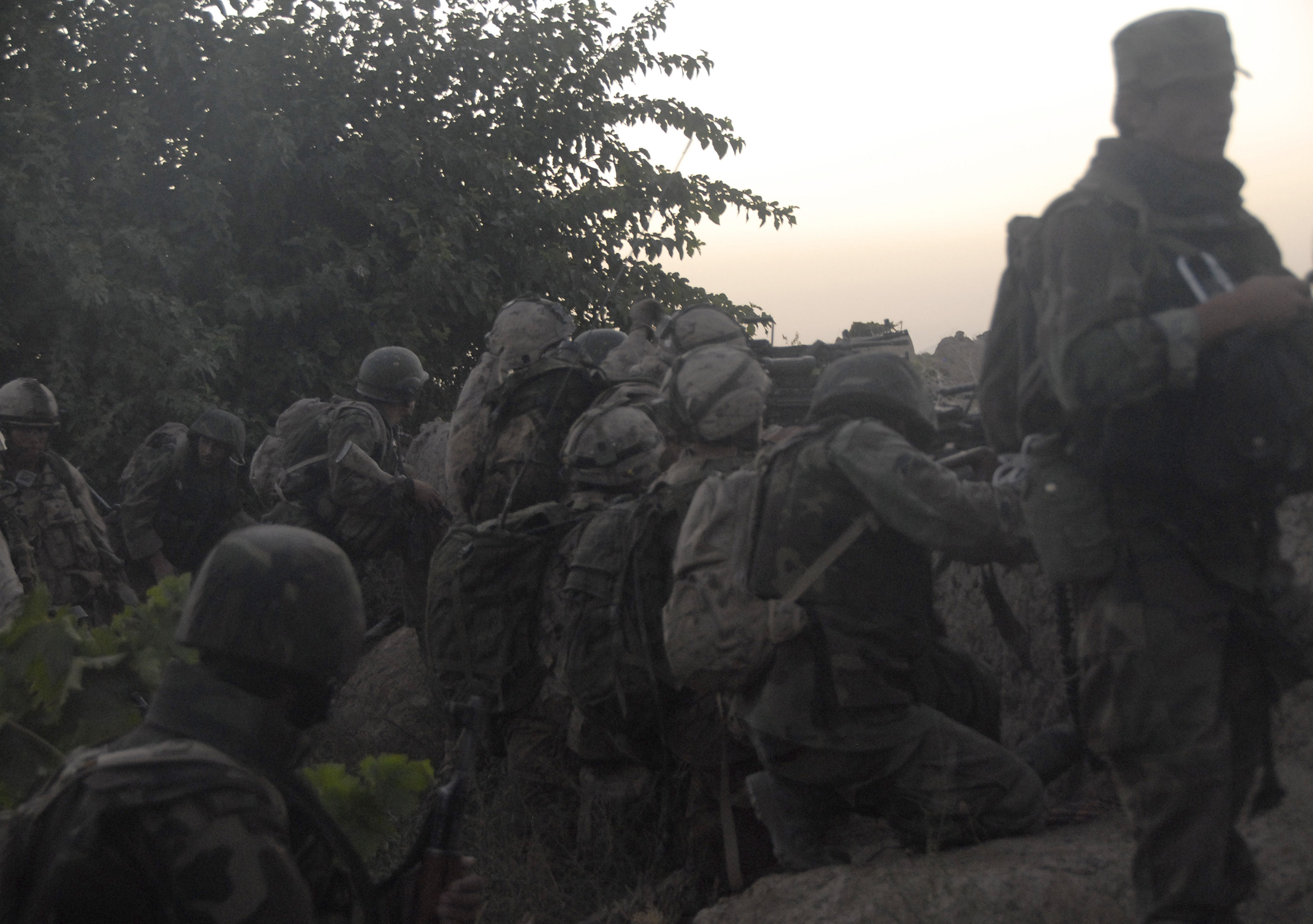
- Canadian and Afghan national army soldiers in combat
Date	1st phase: July 2006; 2nd phase: September–October 2006
Location	Panjwayi District, Kandahar Province, Afghanistan
Result	Coalition victory

Belligerents
Canada; Islamic Republic of Afghanistan; Netherlands; United Kingdom; United States	(Afghanistan) Taliban

Commanders and leaders
Brig. Gen. David Fraser, Commander, Regional Command South; Lt-Col Ian Hope, Commander, TF 1-06, 1 PPCLI Battle Group (1st phase); Lt-Col Omer Lavoie, Commander, TF 3-06, 1 RCR Battle Group (2nd phase)	Hafiz Abdul Majeed Daddullah Lang

Strength
2,000	1,500–2,000 insurgents

Casualties and losses
(Canada) 16 killed, 50 wounded (United States) 2 killed	1,000+ killed (NATO estimate)

The Battle of Panjwaii was fought in mid-2006 with primarily Canadian and Afghan soldiers, supported by small elements of Dutch, American, and British forces against the Taliban. There were two separate times in which the forces were involved in heavy fighting in the region. The first phase was fought in July 2006, and the second encounter lasted from September to October 2006.

== Spring fighting ==
Prior to the summer upsurge of violence and fighting, there were limited contacts in the Panjwai district. On May 17 there were a number of battles between Canadian soldiers and Taliban fighters. One of the contacts claimed the life of Captain Nichola Goddard, Canada's first female combat arms casualty. In another contact on the same day, Sergeant Michael Thomas Victor Denine's acts of heroism resulted in him being later awarded the Medal of Military Valour. After this initial fighting, Task Force Orion operated as a Battle Group in Panjway and Zharie Districts from 23 May until June 14, and were involved in a classic "running fight" with numerous Taliban groups (each containing 30–40 fighters). The Task Force recorded 37 firefights in that period. Then, between June 14 and July 7, 2006, B Company of 2 Princess Patricia's Canadian Light Infantry (PPCLI) remained in Panjwyai to keep the Taliban from seizing the initiative there while the remainder of the Task Force operated in Northern Kandahar.

== The first battle of Panjwaii – Operation Zahara ==
In mid July 2006, Canadian and Afghan forces involved in Operation Mountain Thrust came into the Panjwaii area to help clear the area of Taliban strongholds. On July 8 heavy fighting broke out in the mud wall complexes where Taliban forces decided to dig in and fight for control of this area of Panjwaii. Canadian and Afghan forces on the offensive quickly gained control of the battlefield while heavy fighting was still ongoing. One complete Taliban group was destroyed in this fighting, another received casualties. Taliban groups in Pashmul and eastern Panywayi were forced to withdraw by July 12, when fighting waned.

During the following day Canadian forces were called to support Operation Hewad – a combined endeavour by a complete brigade attempting to clear Taliban from Sangin in Helmand. Canadians were tasked to relieve British soldiers besieged in Sangin district centre, and at the same time pressure Taliban command and control throughout the lower Sangin and Gereshk districts of Helmand, operations that again involved multiple firefights each day with dozens of Taliban casualties, but no Canadian deaths. On July 17 Task Force Orion was ordered to retake the captured towns of Nawa and Garmsir, which they did after intense fighting on July 18. They stayed for another week in Helmand. All these operations affected Canadian operations in the area of the Panjwaii region. The Canadians were assisted by three US special forces teams.

B company continued operations in Panjwayi while Task Force Orion was in Helmand. The task force began concerted operations in Panjwayi again on August 2, and fought fierce battles in Pashmul again on August 3, resulting in 4 Canadians killed and 11 wounded. This battle resulted in numerous Canadian personnel earning Medals of Valour and decorations of Mentioned in Dispatches. Sgt William MacDonald received the Star of Military Valour and Cpl Bryce Keller, one of the soldiers killed on August 3, received the Medal of Military Valour. This marked the first time in Canadian history that the medal was awarded posthumously. Sgt Vaughn Ingram, Cpl Christopher Reid and Pte Kevin Dallaire all received Mentioned in Dispatches decorations posthumously. An estimated 90 Taliban – included three commanders – were killed and wounded in this fighting. The action arrested Taliban plans to launch attacks upon Kandahar City in August. Instead, they attacked Panjwayi District Centre on August 19 (Afghan Independence Day). A tough defensive fight by Afghans and soldiers from A Company 1 PPCLI held the enemy at bay, causing up to 70 Taliban casualties. There was then a lull before fighting recommenced in September.

== The second battle of Panjwaii – Operation Medusa ==
After the fighting in July, Canadian and Afghan forces left the Panjwaii region and it once again became a Taliban stronghold and a thorn in the side of Canadian forces in Kandahar province when the Taliban consequently poured back into the deserted district. The beginning of September saw the beginning of much more intense fighting in the Panjwaii region again. And once again it was Canadians spearheading the Operation. Canadian forces on the first day strategically surrounded the Taliban and called in heavy artillery and air strikes while taking no casualties themselves. On the second day, company-sized elements of the Canadian forces moved in to directly challenge the Taliban. Four soldiers were killed in two attacks. Three were killed while assaulting a Taliban position and one was killed in a bomb attack. The day after was another deadly day, a Canadian soldier was killed and more than thirty others were wounded when an American A-10 accidentally strafed Canadian troops who had called in air support while fighting the Taliban.

For the next few weeks there was more heavy fighting on a daily basis and the Taliban who had begun fighting the battle in a conventional way of trenches started to retreat from the battlefield. Canadian forces then faced sporadic resistance until Canadian forces gained the upper hand. Reconstruction efforts began immediately and small cells of Taliban fighters returned to their deadly tactics of suicide and roadside bombings.

== "The Road to Panjwaii" ==
After major combat operations of Operation Medusa had ceased, the reconstruction efforts began. One project in particular has become a deadly and dangerous effort to help the local economy grow. Canadian Forces began the construction of a road, code-named "Summit", from the Panjwaii area to outlying areas including Kandahar city. The purpose of this road was to improve security in the region by providing a paved route into otherwise difficult and close terrain. Further the road helped the local economy grow by making access to the region much easier. Roadside bombs, booby traps and ambushes targeting engineers who were building the road cost the lives of six Canadians. The road eventually was seen by local farmers as causing problems with the existing irrigation systems and a lot of work by the Canadian Military has gone into trying to correct the problem caused by construction of the road. On October 3, Sgt. Craig Gillam and Cpl. Robert Mitchell were killed when the Taliban ambushed an observation post which had been set up in the area. Canadian soldiers serving in Afghanistan have said that the quick thinking of Sgt. Gillam helped save the lives of numerous more Canadians during the attack. On November 21, two Canadian soldiers were injured, one very seriously, when an anti-personnel mine was triggered. The most seriously wounded soldier was airlifted to Landstuhl Regional Medical Center, Germany with wounds to his lower body that were classed as very serious, but not life-threatening. It is unclear as to whether or not the mine was a newly planted one, or an older mine that had surfaced due to recent heavy rain.

== Civilian toll ==
The Battle of Panjwaii was very light on the side of civilian casualties, with an estimation of a thousand according to SFC Brett Keith. Many civilians left the area before Canadian and Afghan troops moved in. The fighting during Operation Medusa was more conventional (e.g. trenches and "spider holes") than most combat in Afghanistan, and civilians were evacuated out of the combat zones for the most part. This did not stop the Taliban from using houses belonging to civilian populations for cover, resulting in the destruction of several homes.

In late October, a British unit operating in the area called in an airstrike on a confirmed Taliban gathering and NATO jets attacked. The bombs killed more than sixty people, most of which the Taliban fighters claimed were civilians intentionally targeted by NATO. This claim was disputed by NATO commanders in Afghanistan who, after a short investigation of the site, came to their own conclusion that the majority of those killed were, in fact, Taliban fighters. NATO did, however, confirm that a large number of civilians were killed in the attack and quickly made a public apology for the deaths.

== Post-Medusa Panjwaii ==
After the fighting of Operation Medusa ended, the Taliban were no longer in the district in any large numbers but attacks were still occurring fairly regularly against the Canadian forces. Mortar and bomb attacks as well as some gun battles were a stark reminder that the Taliban, although no longer massed, were still a real threat. Bomb attacks in November claimed the lives of two Canadian and one American soldier in the area. On December 2, a squadron of Canadian Leopard C2 tanks which were deployed as reinforcements during Operation Medusa made their way from Kandahar Airfield to a Canadian forward operating base in the Panjwayi district. The Canadian tanks are the heaviest piece of equipment, both in weight and firepower, that have been seen in the Panjwayi district since the Soviet fighting during the 1980s. The day after being deployed to the forward operating base, the first shots from a Canadian tank in a combat zone since the Korean War were fired. Taliban fighters attacked the Canadian base with rockets and quickly received cannon fire from the Leopard tanks.

=== Operation Falcon Summit ===
Operation Falcon Summit was launched on December 15, 2006, when British, Canadian, Danish, and Estonian troops began massing in the Panjwayi district the morning after NATO airstrikes hit a Taliban command post. The operation was aimed at keeping up the momentum that was gathered during Operation Medusa.

The first operation-related casualty was a Canadian soldier who, while en route to a meeting with tribal elders to discuss reconstruction that would be happening during and after the operation, stepped on a landmine. The soldier, Private Frederic Couture of the Royal 22^{e} Régiment (the "Vandoos") suffered severe but not life-threatening injuries from the blast. The landmine had been planted the night before by Taliban troops that were shot and killed by Canadian soldiers who then attempted to clear away all the landmines in the area.

On December 19, the Canadian forces in the area began a massive artillery and tank barrage on Taliban positions in the area of operations. Canadian Leopard tanks, M777 howitzers and heavy machine guns fired on Taliban positions for forty-five minutes before the barrage ended and Canadian ground forces advanced and secured a perimeter around the town of Howz-e Madad without firing a shot.
