= Omer Lavoie =

Canadian Army officer

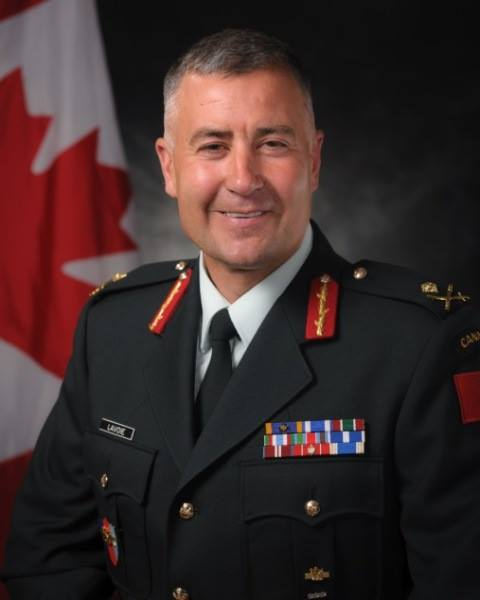
- Born: Marathon, Ontario, Canada
- Allegiance: Canada
- Branch: Canadian Army
- Service years: 1991-Present
- Rank: Lieutenant-general
- Conflicts: Afghan War; Kosovo; Bosnia
- Awards: Commander of the Order of Military Merit; Meritorious Service Cross; Canadian Forces' Decoration

Lieutenant-General Omer Lavoie, CMM, MSC, CD is a retired senior officer in the Canadian Army and the Canadian Armed Forces. He was the commander of the 4th Canadian Division until the summer of 2014. He was promoted to major general in January 2016, and appointed commander of 1st Canadian Division. He served as battle group commander of the 1 RCR Battle Group, Task Force 3-06, from July 2006 to February 2007 in Kandahar, Afghanistan.

== Biography ==
Lavoie joined the CF in 1983 as a private soldier in The Lake Superior Scottish Regiment. Upon high school graduation, he transferred to the Regular Force and attended Royal Roads Military College from 1985-1989. Upon completion of infantry phase training, he was posted to Second Battalion, The Royal Canadian Regiment.

Lavoie's regimental employment includes service with 2 RCR, 1 RCR and as the regimental adjutant. As a member of 2 RCR, he was employed as a platoon commander, officer commanding reconnaissance platoon and as a company second-in command. While posted to 1 RCR, he served as the battle group operations officer and as officer commanding the Duke of Edinburgh's Company.

Lavoie's extra regimental service has included postings to Canadian Forces Northern Area Headquarters in Yellowknife, attendance at the CF Command and Staff College in Toronto, and staff officer to Director General Strategic Planning in National Defence Headquarters.

Lavoie assumed command of 1st Battalion, The Royal Canadian Regiment, on 24 June 2005. Shortly after his appointment, Lavoie commenced specialized training for OP ATHENA and deployed to Afghanistan in August 2006.

Lavoie's operational experience includes employment as a rifle platoon commander during the OKA Crisis, as a company second-in-command in Croatia and Bosnia in 1992/1993, and as a battle group operations officer in Kosovo in 1999/2000. He was commanding officer of the 1 RCR Battle Group in Afghanistan in 2006/2007.

In 2019, Lavoie was promoted to lieutenant general and appointed deputy commander of Allied Joint Force Command Naples.

== Awards ==
MGen Lavoie has been awarded the Meritorious Service Cross for his role in leading 1st Battalion, The Royal Canadian Regiment Battle Group, in Afghanistan and has been awarded the NATO Meritorious Service Medal for leading NATO's first offensive ground operation at the Battle Group level and defeating the enemy during Operation MEDUSA.

The citation reads: "From August 2006 to February 2007, Lieutenant-Colonel Lavoie commanded the 1st Battalion, Royal Canadian Regiment Battle Group, in southern Afghanistan. He played a leading role in two complex brigade operations, including Operation MEDUSA, the most significant ground combat operation in NATO’s history. His battle group’s actions throughout their operational tour set the conditions for thousands of Afghans to return to their homes. During this period of sustained intense combat, Lieutenant-Colonel Lavoie led from the front, sharing the dangers and harsh living conditions of his troops. His exceptional professionalism and leadership in combat brought great credit to the Canadian Forces, to Canada and to NATO."
