= David Fraser (Canadian general) =

Canadian Forces officer

David Fraser CMM MSC MSM CD
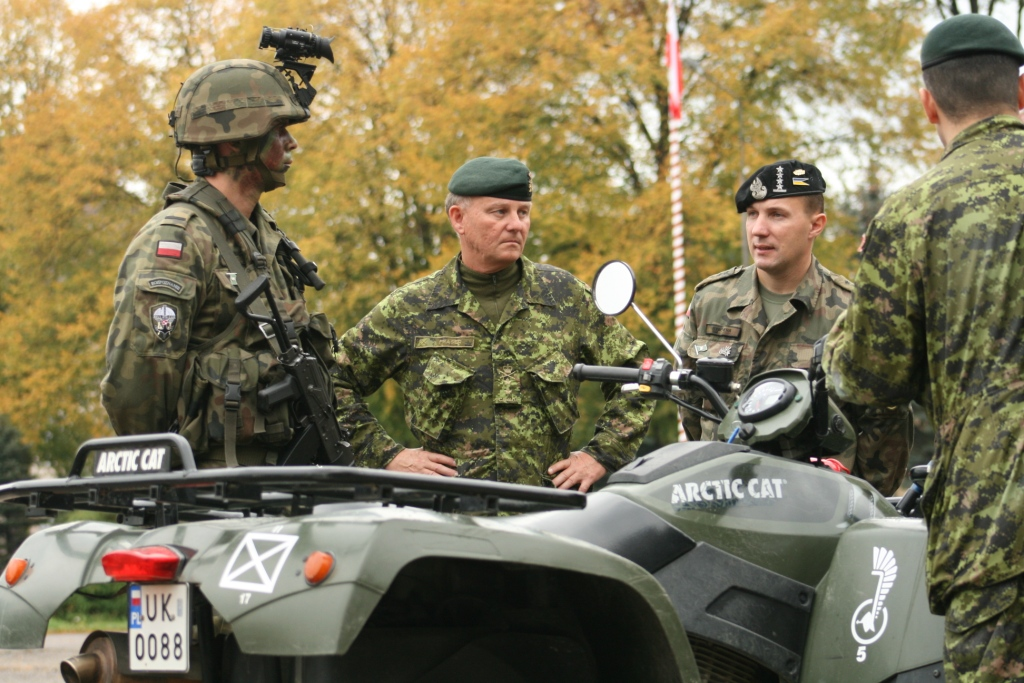
- Fraser second from the left
- Education: Carleton University; Royal Military College of Canada; Queen's University at Kingston
- Military career
- Allegiance: Canada
- Element: Canadian Army
- Service years: 1980–2011
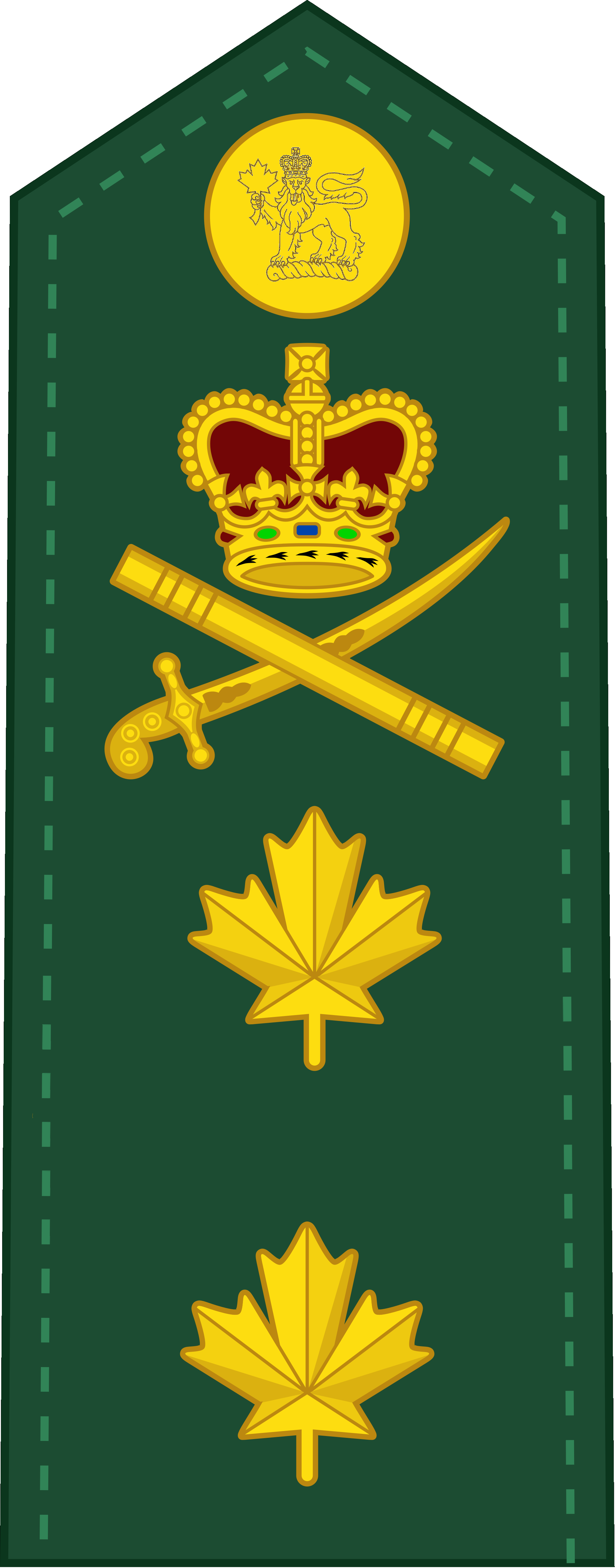
- Rank: Major-general
- Conflicts: War in Afghanistan

David Allison Fraser CMM MSC MSM CD is a retired Canadian Forces officer who served as a major-general in Land Force Command. The country’s first general officer to command American troops in combat since the Second World War, Fraser's most noteworthy role was as brigadier-general during Operation Medusa, which took place in Afghanistan from September 1–17, 2006 as part of NATO’s coalition efforts in the region.

Since retiring from the Canadian Armed Forces in 2011 after 32 years of service, Fraser has worked in the private sector, currently serving as president of AEGIS Six Corporation. In May 2018, he released Operation Medusa: The Furious Battle That Saved Afghanistan from the Taliban, which he co-authored with Brian Hanington. The book recounts his experience as commander of NATO forces in this battle, detailing the preparation, execution and aftermath of the conflict.

== Education ==
Fraser studied political science and psychology at Carleton University in Ottawa, graduating in 1980 with a bachelor of arts. He graduated from the Canadian Armed Forces Command and Staff College in Toronto in 1990 and earned a Master of Management and Policy from the Royal Military College and Queen's University in 2001. He completed the American Capstone program and trained at the Ivey Business School, where he currently acts as a mentor.

== Military career ==
Fraser joined the Canadian Armed Forces after graduating from Carleton University in 1980. His responsibilities and positions over the next 19 years were varied, including acting as chief of staff for the Alberta District, working as a Canadian officer responsible for domestic and international planning, and commanding Infantry Battalion in Canada and Bosnia. Fraser then worked as director of the Land Force Command Reserve Restructure in Ottawa from 2001 to 2003 and as co-director of the Bi-National Planning Group in Colorado Springs from 2003 to 2005. He deployed to Afghanistan in January 2006, where, as a brigadier-general, he commanded thousands of NATO troops. One of his main responsibilities there was to lead Operation Medusa in southern Afghanistan that September. Fraser subsequently acted as commandant of the Canadian Forces College in Toronto from 2007 to 2009 and led the Joint Headquarters Renewal Project in 2009 and 2010. He directed the Land Force Doctrine and Training System, and the 1st Canadian Division until 2011, retiring from military service that year.

=== Operation Medusa ===
Operation Medusa, which took place from September 1 to 17, 2006 during the second Battle of Panjwaii, was a seminal moment in Canada’s involvement in the Invasion of Afghanistan. Intended to secure the authority of the democratic government of Afghanistan in the south of the country, the Canada-led offensive was the largest battle fought by Canadian troops since the country’s involvement in the Korean War.

Fraser was sent to the southern Afghan province of Kandahar, where, as Commander of Regional Command South, he controlled thousands of NATO troops in the southern Afghan provinces of Kandahar, Helmand, Zabul, Uruzgan, Daikundi and Nimroz. The battle spanned a stretch of the Arghandab River valley west of the city of Kandahar. The Taliban amassed on the north side as NATO forces pushed forward from the southern bank. The operation was generally considered successful as it maintained NATO’s credibility within the region and overwhelmed the Taliban forces, which suffered heavy losses.

These successes of Operation Medusa came at the cost of six Canadian and twelve British lives. Then general and Chief of Defence Staff Rick Hillier commented afterward on the toll of the first two days of the operation, underscoring the loss of life. Charles Company of the Royal Canadian Regiment was hit particularly hard. On September 4, an American Fairchild Republic A-10 Thunderbolt II ground attack aircraft mistakenly strafed the company as it was preparing to attack a Taliban position, resulting in one death and thirty injuries. Despite this and other unforeseen difficulties such as running out of ammunition, the Canadians prevented further advance of the Taliban within Afghanistan. In his book Operation Medusa: The Furious Battle That Saved Afghanistan from the Taliban, Fraser assessed the effect of the operation, calling it a costly yet necessary fight that enabled Afghanistan to continue as a western installed democracy. The efforts of the Canadians and their allies were instrumental in enabling western back Afghan leaders to develop a new constitution, to ensure free and democratic elections, to make it possible for more girls to go to school, and to initiate reform in defence, justice and finance structures within the country.

==== Controversy ====
Despite its success, the operation and its aftermath were not without controversy. In 2007 and 2008, newspaper reports revealed that the Leopard tanks sent to Afghanistan had been taken from Canadian monuments. Fraser had requested tanks for the operation to make advances into Taliban controlled settlements while minimizing collateral damage. According to the Canadian Forces, however, such reports were exaggerated since it retained sufficient numbers of functioning tanks in its inventory at the time.

In 2016, Operation Medusa was once again brought into public discussion after Fraser admitted that he believed one of the results of the battle had been counterproductive. He commented that the coalition’s attempts to remove the Taliban while attacking al-Qaeda complicated the international community’s ability to complete its mission. According to Fraser, this change in strategy left a vacuum of leadership in its wake. The Taliban consequently took root and flourished at a local level. Afghan leaders have since resumed negotiations with the Taliban in Pakistan, attesting to Fraser’s analysis. According to Fraser, Canada made a similar mistake in Libya, which has since suffered two civil wars. He urged in 2018 that the whole-of-government, multicultural approach used by Canada during Operation Medusa be applied in the upcoming peacekeeping efforts in Mali.

In 2017, Harjit Sajjan, the Minister of National Defence, who had served as the primary liaison between Canadian commanders and local Afghan leaders during the conflict, claimed that he had been the architect of the operation. Later that year, Sajjan issued a formal apology for embellishing his role in the battle after he was criticized by fellow military personnel. His apology included reference to David Fraser, hailing Fraser’s leadership as elemental to Operation Medusa’s success.

== Retirement ==
Fraser’s first appointment in the private sector was as chief operating officer of Blue Goose Pure Foods, a retailer of organic meats headquartered in Toronto. He took up the same position at INKAS, a national manufacturing company specializing in armoured vehicles, until June 2016. Fraser has since worked professionally as a public speaker. In 2016, he delivered the keynote address at the FABTECH Canada conference, focusing his remarks on the nature of effective teamwork and leadership.

In collaboration with Brian Hanington, David Fraser wrote Operation Medusa: The Furious Battle That Saved Afghanistan from the Taliban, a book about his experience as the commander of this operation. It was published in 2018 and sat on The Globe and Mail Canadian Non-Fiction Bestsellers List for a number of weeks. The book offers the senior commander’s view of the political, strategic and tactical complexities of the bloodiest battle in NATO’s history. It has been described by Murray Brewster as a cautionary tale of political hubris that offered lessons for Canada’s current peacekeeping missions.

Reception of the book was generally positive. Brett Boudreau extolled its clear and accessible account of the battle, while Murray Brewster commented that it spoke volumes with its dignified omission of Harjit Sajjan and the ensuing controversy. The greatest acclaim was from J. Paul de B. Taillon. His article in The Dorchester Review stated that Operation Medusa should be "compulsory reading for junior and senior officers, politicians, bureaucrats, and academics." Taillon also deemed the book a "corrective for those who believe that fighting or reading about the ‘last war’ is of little value."

== Awards ==
Fraser received numerous awards during his tenure in the Canadian Armed Forces. The United States government presented him with the Legion of Merit and the Bronze Star. He was also awarded several Canadian honours, such as the Commander of Military Merit award, the Meritorious Service Cross, the Vimy Award, the Atlantic Council of Canada Award and the Meritorious Service Medal.

== Medals ==

Ribbon	Description	Notes
	Order of Military Merit (CMM)	
	Meritorious Service Cross (MSC)	
	Meritorious Service Medal (MSM)	Awarded in 1996
	South-West Asia Service Medal	With Afghanistan Bar
	General Campaign Star	South-West Asia
	Canadian Peacekeeping Service Medal	
	UN Mission in Cyprus	With "2" Numerial
	UN Protection Force (Yugoslavia)	With "2" Numeral
	NATO Mission in Yugoslavia	
	Queen Elizabeth II's Diamond Jubilee Medal	
	Canadian Forces' Decoration (CD)	2 Clasps; 32 years of service in the Canadian Forces
	Alberta Centennial Medal	
	NATO Meritorious Service Medal	
	Legion of Merit	Degree of Officer; From United States of America
	Bronze Star	From the United States of America
	Order of Merit of the Republic of Poland	Degree of Officer
