= Akhtar Mohammad Osmani =

Taliban leader

Mullah Akhtar Mohammad Osmani or Usmani (died 19 December 2006) was a senior leader of the Taliban, treasurer for the organization, and close associate of Osama bin Laden and Mohammed Omar. He was involved in the demolition of the Buddhas of Bamyan and was considered a potential successor to Mullah Omar. Hamid Karzai, President of Afghanistan, once referred to him as one of the four most dangerous Taliban members still in Afghanistan.

Shortly after the 11 September attacks, CIA officer Robert Grenier met him to offer the Taliban the opportunity to give up Osama bin Laden.

In December 2006, as he was riding in a four-wheel drive vehicle in Helmand Province, Osmani was killed by a smart bomb in a United States Air Force airstrike. He had been tracked down by a Royal Air Force airplane which monitored his satellite phone. Spokesmen of the Taliban initially denied his death and claimed that the bomb had instead killed a Taliban leader called Abdul Zahir. However, several days later other top Taliban officials confirmed his death.

== Mental health ==
While Taliban provincial governor in Mazar-e-Sharif, he began seeing Afghan psychiatrist Nader Alemi, the only psychiatrist in northern Afghanistan to speak Pashto, the language of most Taliban. Akhtar only kept a few appointments as he would go off on missions every three months. "I used to treat the Taliban as human beings, same as I would treat my other patients… " said Alemi.
