= Operation Medusa =

Military operation in Afghanistan

Coordinates: 31.5478°N 65.4542°E

- Part of the Battle of Panjwaii in the War in Afghanistan of the War on terror
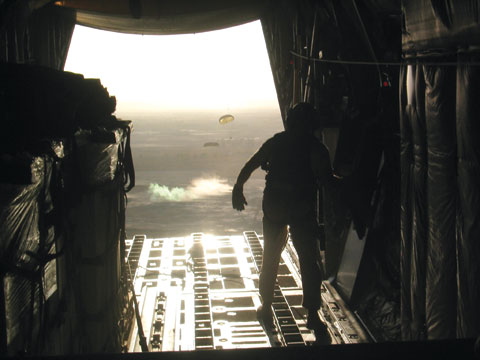
- Canadian C–130 Hercules conducting a cargo drop over Kandahar in support of coalition forces.
Date	2–17 September 2006
Location	Panjwayi and Zhari districts, Kandahar Province, Afghanistan
Result	Tactical Canadian victory: Taliban Panjwayi stronghold destroyed; Continued guerilla warfare; Precursor to Operation Falcon Summit; See aftermath

Belligerents
ISAF: Canada; Supported by: United States; United Kingdom; Netherlands; Denmark; Afghanistan	Taliban

Units involved
(Canada) Canadian Armed Forces: 1st Battalion, Royal Canadian Regiment; 2nd Regiment, Royal Canadian Horse Artillery; Supported by: (United States) US Armed Forces: 2nd Battalion, 87th Infantry Regiment; 3rd Special Forces Group (Airborne); 25th Field Artillery Regiment; Netherlands Armed Forces (Denmark) Danish Defence (Afghanistan) Afghan National Army and Police (United States) US Air Force (close air support) (United Kingdom) Royal Air Force (aerial reconnaissance)	Unknown

Strength
(Canada) Canadian Armed Forces: 1,000 soldiers; M777 155mm artillery pieces; LAV III armoured vehicles; Leopard 2 tanks; Netherlands Armed Forces: PzH 2000 155mm self-propelled artillery; (United States) US Air Force: A-10 Thunderbolt ground-attack aircraft; B-1 Lancer bomber aircraft; Boeing AH-64 Apache attack helicopters; Lockheed AC-130 gunships; (United Kingdom) Royal Air Force: Nimrod MR2 surveillance aircraft; (Islamic Republic of Afghanistan) Afghan National Army: Five companies; Total: ~2,200 soldiers	1,200+ insurgents

Casualties and losses
(Canada) 12 killed, 40 wounded (Afghanistan) 3 killed (Netherlands) 1 killed (United States) 1 killed (United Kingdom) 1 Nimrod MR2 aircraft, 14 killed (Note: 2006 Royal Air Force Nimrod crash)	NATO claim: 512 killed; 136 captured
- 40 civilians reportedly killed

Operation Medusa (September 2–17, 2006) was a Canadian-led NATO offensive during the Battle of Panjwaii, in the War in Afghanistan. The operation was launched to counter a major Taliban build-up near Kandahar City, as well as to establish government control in the district of Panjwayi, some 30 kilometres west of the city. It marked the most significant land battle undertaken by NATO, as well as the largest Canadian combat operation since the end of the Korean War.

The operation was primarily fought by the 1st Battalion of the Royal Canadian Regiment Battle Group, including other elements of the International Security Assistance Force such as A Co, 2-4 Infantry BN, 4th BDE and 10th Mtn Division. The operation was supported by the Afghan National Army and a team from the United States Army's 1st Battalion, 3rd Special Forces Group (Airborne), augmented by C Company, 2nd Battalion, 87th Infantry Regiment of the 10th Mountain Division.

Despite taking significant casualties and being removed from their entrenched positions, the Taliban retained their presence in Kandahar Province and continued to target coalition forces with guerrilla warfare. The aftermath of the battle served as a precursor to Operation Falcon Summit, a regional Canadian-led offensive to eliminate remaining insurgents.

As a result of Operation Medusa, 12 Canadian soldiers were killed; five during the major combat operations, five in bombings, and two in a mortar/RPG attacks during the reconstruction phase of the operation. Fourteen British military personnel were also killed when their plane crashed after suffering an on-board fire following aerial refuelling. The crash marked the biggest single loss of life suffered by the British military since the Falklands War.

== Background ==
This area is characterized by numerous small farming villages in the valley of the Arghandab River southwest of Kandahar City. NATO forces believed it to be a Taliban stronghold. It was previously assaulted in the Battle of Panjwaii during the summer of 2006, but Taliban forces re-asserted their presence after the operation ended. Operation Medusa involved most of the Canadian Forces' combat troops in Afghanistan, which provided the bulk of the force there, including troops from 1st Battalion, The Royal Canadian Regiment Battle Group as well various company-sized formations from the US Army (Special Operations Forces; A Company 2nd Battalion 4th Infantry Regiment; 4th Brigade Combat Team 10th Mountain Division; and members of the Oregon National Guard). Dutch and Danish soldiers were also involved–albeit peripherally, as well as hundreds of Afghan soldiers. The Dutch PzH 2000 howitzer was positioned with the Canadian M777 Howitzers of Echo Battery (2RCHA) and made its combat debut with the Dutch Army as fire support.

=== Battle of the White School ===
On 3 August 2006, Canadian forces were conducting an operation in the Pashmul village, as part of Operation Zahara. Canadian intelligence reports believed there to be an enemy force of approximately 20 Taliban fighters occupying the Bayenzi White School complex. A convoy of six LAV III armoured vehicles departed Kandahar Airfield for the school, located 35 kilometers to the west of the objective. At approximately 4:00 A.M., the convoy crossed the Arghandab River. At 4:20 A.M., the lead vehicle in the convoy struck a roadside improvised explosive device, triggering an explosion, killing its driver and injuring a number of soldiers inside. At approximately 9:00 A.M., a second LAV struck another roadside explosive device, however only minor injuries were sustained. At approximately 11:30 A.M., given the limited mobility of armoured vehicles due to the heavy presence of mines, a dismounted force of around 15 soldiers from Princess Patricia's Canadian Light Infantry, alongside members of the Afghan National Police (ANP), advanced towards the complex on foot across open terrain. The LAVs remained in their positions where they fired high explosive rounds into the school to cover the movement of advancing troops. At this time, the soldiers became fired upon with small arms and rocket-propelled grenades from the vicinity of the school. The LAVs returned fire. Artillery support was reportedly denied.

By approximately 12:03 P.M., members of the Afghan Police reached the school and began clearing the building, later confirming that it was empty. A short time later, Taliban fighters once again engaged the group from multiple directions, utilizing the cover of tall marijuana fields and improvised dugouts. This time the fighting was much more intense, with some Taliban fighters reportedly even entering a portion of the school and engaging in close-quarters combat with the ANP [citation needed]. The LAVs continued providing fire support but also reportedly began taking fire themselves, including RPGs. The soldiers were forced to withdraw from the area to an outbuilding where they became pinned down and surrounded by an overwhelming force of an estimated 200 Taliban fighters. The enemy was reported to be only 20 metres away [citation needed]. By approximately 2:00 P.M., an RPG struck the outhouse. The blast killed 3 Canadian soldiers and wounded 4. Two LAVs moved toward the building, retrieving the dead and wounded before successfully withdrawing.

The costly engagement highlighted the underestimation of Taliban fighters in the area, their fortified presence around the school complex and their ability to carry out future attacks on Kandahar City, all contributed to its designation as a principal objective during the upcoming Operation Medusa. [citation needed]

== Battle ==
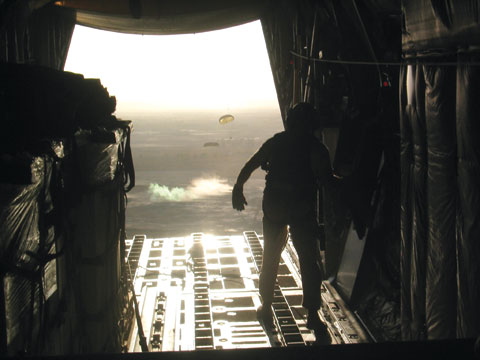
A Canadian C–130 drops containerized delivery system bundles in support of Operation Medusa

=== September 2, 2006 ===
NATO said on September 3, 2006 that the previous day, Afghan and NATO forces killed more than 200 suspected Taliban fighters in a major operation in southern Afghanistan. Four Canadian soldiers were killed and nine others were wounded in the fighting. A further statement from the alliance said:

Reports indicate that more than 200 Taliban fighters have been killed since Operation Medusa began early morning on September 2, 2006. This figure was arrived at by reviewing information from ISAF surveillance and reconnaissance assets operating in Panjwaye and Zhari districts, as well as information reported by various Afghan officials and citizens living nearby,

More than 80 suspected Taliban fighters were captured by Afghan police and a further 180 insurgents were seen fleeing the district, the statement said.

The air-offensive commenced on September 2 while ground forces positioned themselves in a pincer, north and south of the Panjwayi District. The air attacks led to the killing, in the first two days, of around 200 Taliban fighters and the arrest of another 80. While supporting the operation a British Nimrod MR2 reconnaissance aircraft crashed, killing all 14 on board. This represented the largest single fatal incident involving British troops in Afghanistan. The UK Ministry of Defence believed the crash was not the result of hostile action.

Stronger than expected resistance was put up by the Taliban forces, whom NATO expected to simply retreat. Instead, they prepared for the decisive engagement, deciding to take advantage of the defensively advantageous ground of the district, and laid traps for the coming NATO troops. The NATO troops' objective was, basically, to capture a grouping of villages known as Pashmul, which had been the site of repeated battles throughout the summer of 2006 and where several Canadian soldiers were killed on August 3.

An odd decision made at RC(S) changed the tone of the battle. "C" Company of 1st Battalion Royal Canadian Regiment Battle Group was positioned for a feint in the south while the bombing went on. Three days ahead of schedule "C" Company was suddenly ordered to cross the Arghandab River and move into Pashmul. Enemy resistance was severe. Several Canadian vehicles were lost, four Canadian soldiers were killed, and nine were wounded in the intense fighting. Explosions echoed across grape and pomegranate fields and clouds of dust rose amid the greenery and dried-mud houses of the Panjwayi district, which is about 12 miles (19 km) from Kandahar city.

After Operation Medusa started, authorities in Kandahar warned people not to travel off the main highway in the province, which leads into Panjwayi. The road was blocked by soldiers–not far from where bombing was taking place. Some military Humvees were parked nearby. Observers reported that 180 Taliban fighters managed to escape the district.

=== September 4 and 5 ===
On September 4 there was a friendly fire incident. U.S. warplanes mistakenly strafed "C" Company, as they were preparing to once again attack Pashmul. NATO said the incident happened after ground troops battling Taliban militants requested air support. NATO said in a statement, "Two USAF aircraft provided the support but regrettably engaged friendly forces during a strafing run, using cannons." NATO later identified the planes as US A-10 Thunderbolt II. The A-10 aircraft pilot mistook the Canadians’ burning garbage pile for a smoke device that was previously dropped to help him identify the Taliban position. In the confusion the pilot opened fire on the Canadian camp. While many soldiers were wounded, former Olympian Mark Graham was the only fatality of this tragic accident. The incident essentially rendered "C" Company combat ineffective. Emphasis was switched from the southern flank of Panjwayi to the north. As forces reoriented themselves the Canadian and Dutch artillery as well as NATO air power resumed their attacks.

Canadian and Dutch artillery and NATO air strikes killed at least 51 suspected Taliban militants. Maj. Scott Lundy said earlier that an estimated 700 militants were "trapped" in an area spanning several hundred square miles in Panjwayi and Zhari districts, some in fortified compounds, others moving in the open. Also on the fourth day, first reports of civilian casualties emerged with people saying that at least 10 civilians from the same family were killed in the bombing since the start of the operation.

=== September 5th and 6th ===
Five soldiers were wounded in an ambush by an 82mm recoilless rifle while in an all-around-defensive. Around sundown, members of 22B were struck by a rocket, which bounced off the ground then struck the LAV’s 4 tires, destroying the right side of the LAV. The shrapnel injured 5 soldiers, of which 2 were repatriated home. After the ambush, members from 5 Platoon engaged the enemy, taking control of the recoilless rifle to prevent additional casualties.

On the fifth day Canadian and Dutch artillery and NATO airstrikes continued pounding Taliban positions, killing another 40 fighters who tried to break through NATO lines and escape. Forward observers reported that the Taliban fighters that remained had entrenched themselves and were ready for a fight.

=== September 8 ===
The next two days there was a lull in fighting. But it flared up again on September 8, 2006. Ground combat renewed and in the fighting on the 8 and 9 September another 40 Taliban fighters and one American soldier were killed. "We are engaging with everything from direct fire to artillery and air strikes," an official with the NATO-led ISAF said. Three insurgent positions, a bomb-making factory, and a weapons cache were destroyed, and ISAF troops occupied parts of Panjwayi and Zhari districts. "Afghan and ISAF troops have reopened Highway 1 to civilian traffic and will maintain a patrolling presence to ensure civilians can travel the route in increased safety," ISAF said.

=== September 9 and 10 ===
Late on September 9, 2006 the fighting started up again and lasted until morning of the 10th. NATO said 94 militants were killed in both Panjwayi and neighboring Zhari districts. Late on the 10th insurgents staged a counterattack which led to the killing of another 92 militants, many falling easy prey to the Canadian snipers positioned on hills.

=== September 11–14 ===
The next four days there was virtually no fighting with NATO reporting that the Taliban have fled. NATO troops, however, found a large number of booby traps left behind by the Taliban. On September 14, the 11th day of the operation, troops began moving ahead into Taliban-controlled areas of Pashmula. As the hours unfolded evidence of the Taliban's presence mounted: 50 kilograms (110 lb) of nitrogen, dozens of batteries, rocket-propelled grenades, ammunition, tunnels and bunkers. Meanwhile, connections to drug trafficking were evident at the compound. NATO and Afghan soldiers had to check every building and scour every inch of ground before victory could be declared and residents allowed to return to their homes. "Caution is the name of the game today," Major Geoff Abthorpe, Officer Commanding "B" Company, said Wednesday as the day began. "Slow is smooth, and smooth is fast." As NATO troops forged ahead, they were on the lookout for Taliban fighters. The insurgents had shown a stronger-than-expected resistance, but it now appeared they've fled their stronghold, which some had suspected would serve as a last stand. Many Canadian soldiers were excited and had anxiety because they were worried that the Taliban managed to flee to fight another day. But at the day's end an Afghan interpreter with the Canadian troops reported that he heard radio chatter from the Taliban, and that they were saying about pulling together in a spot to dig in and fight.

But the Taliban did not dig in. Instead some 400 heavily armed Taliban crossed into the western Farah province, taking control of its Gulistan district after chasing away the police and burning the district headquarters and a local clinic on September 14, 2006.

=== September 17 ===
NATO announced the operation over on September 17, 2006. They said that the operation was a success in destroying the Taliban force that was massing near Kandahar, and the Taliban had been driven from both Panjwayi and Zhari districts of Kandahar province.

== Aftermath ==
A day after NATO declared victory a suicide bomber in Panjwayi district of Kandahar province killed four Canadian soldiers while they were on a security patrol. While the operation was going on, in other attacks by the Taliban, in the same period, four American and four British soldiers were killed along with dozens of Afghan soldiers and police, and dozens of civilians. Military operations of Operation Medusa did not stop on September 17 though. The seventeenth was the date that the major combat of the operation ended. After that the next phases of operation Medusa began which included reconstruction of infrastructure and roadways, combined with efforts to help the local people return home and link the regional economy to the rest of the country.

Although suffering a brutal battlefield defeat, the Taliban retained their presence in Kandahar province. On October 6, 2006 anonymous commanders from five NATO countries, were demanding their governments "get tough" with Pakistan over the alleged support and sanctuary the Pakistani Interservices Intelligence (ISI) provided to the Taliban during operation Medusa. Despite the end of combat operations, heavy fighting continued in the area. In the last week of October 2006, dozens of civilians were reported killed in ISAF operations. A local council member was quoted as stating, "The government and the coalition told the families that there are no Taliban in the area any more. If there are no Taliban, then why are they bombing the area?"

At the start of the battle, NATO said there were no reports of civilian casualties, despite the heavy amount of firepower being used. Afghan Defense Ministry spokesman Gen. Zahir Azimi, citing intelligence reports, said 89 suspected Taliban militants and an uncertain number of civilians had been killed during the first two days of fighting in Panjwayi district. It was not immediately possible to gain independent confirmation of the casualty reports, as the government had ordered vehicles off the roads leading to Panjwayi during the operation. A NATO statement said its troops reported dozens of insurgents killed during the first day of the operation. It said many more had been wounded, and a significant number arrested. The tough military action had brought with it a risk of civilian deaths. Besides the physical injuries, many Coalition soldiers suffered from mental problems.

The follow-up operation, Operation Falcon Summit, generally did not involve such heavy firepower, instead using small infantry units searching villages in co-operation with tribal elders.

== See also ==
- Coalition combat operations in Afghanistan in 2006
- 2006 Taliban offensive
