= Timeline of the War in Afghanistan (2001–2021) =

War in Afghanistan (2001–2021)
- Part of the war on terror and the Afghan conflict
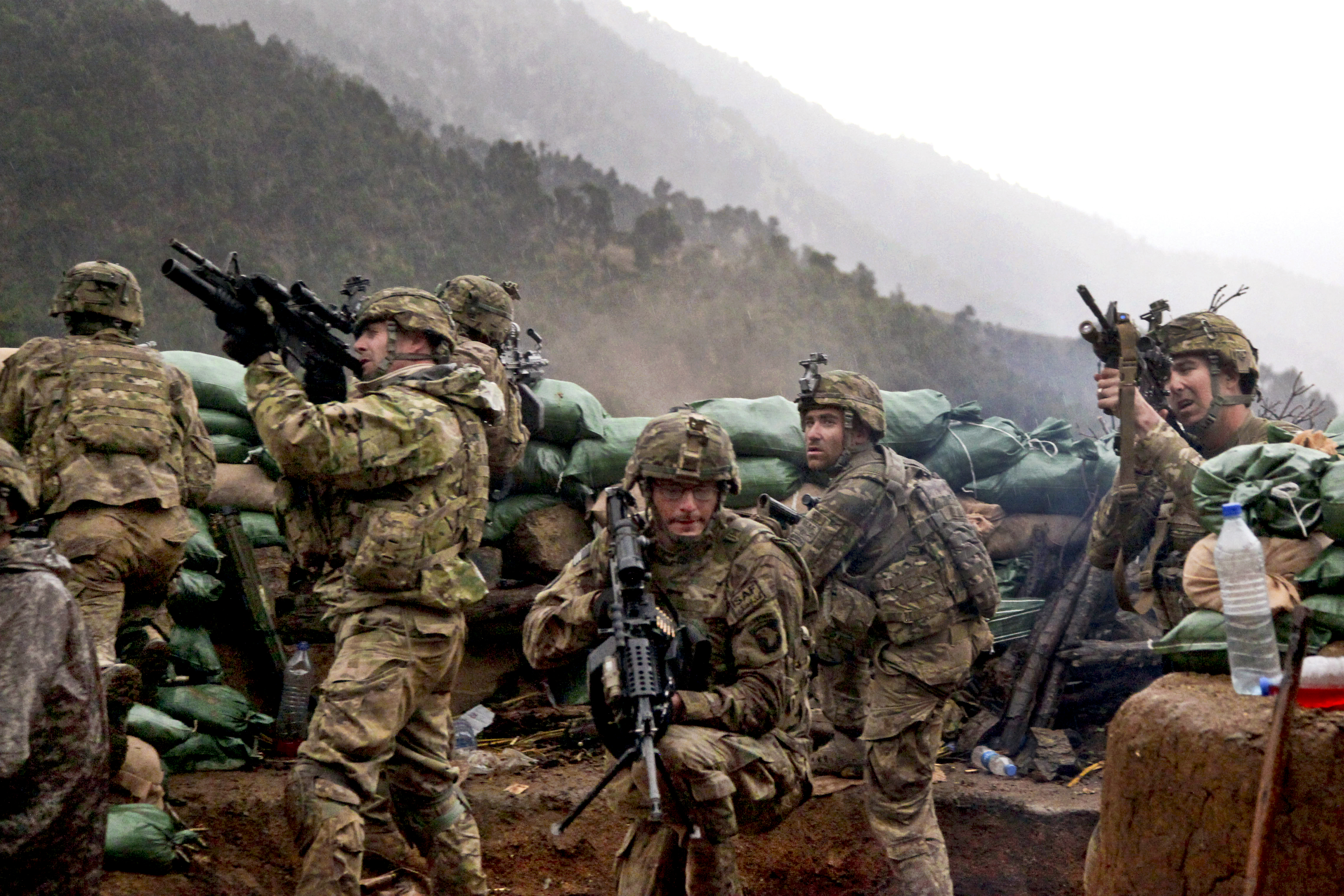
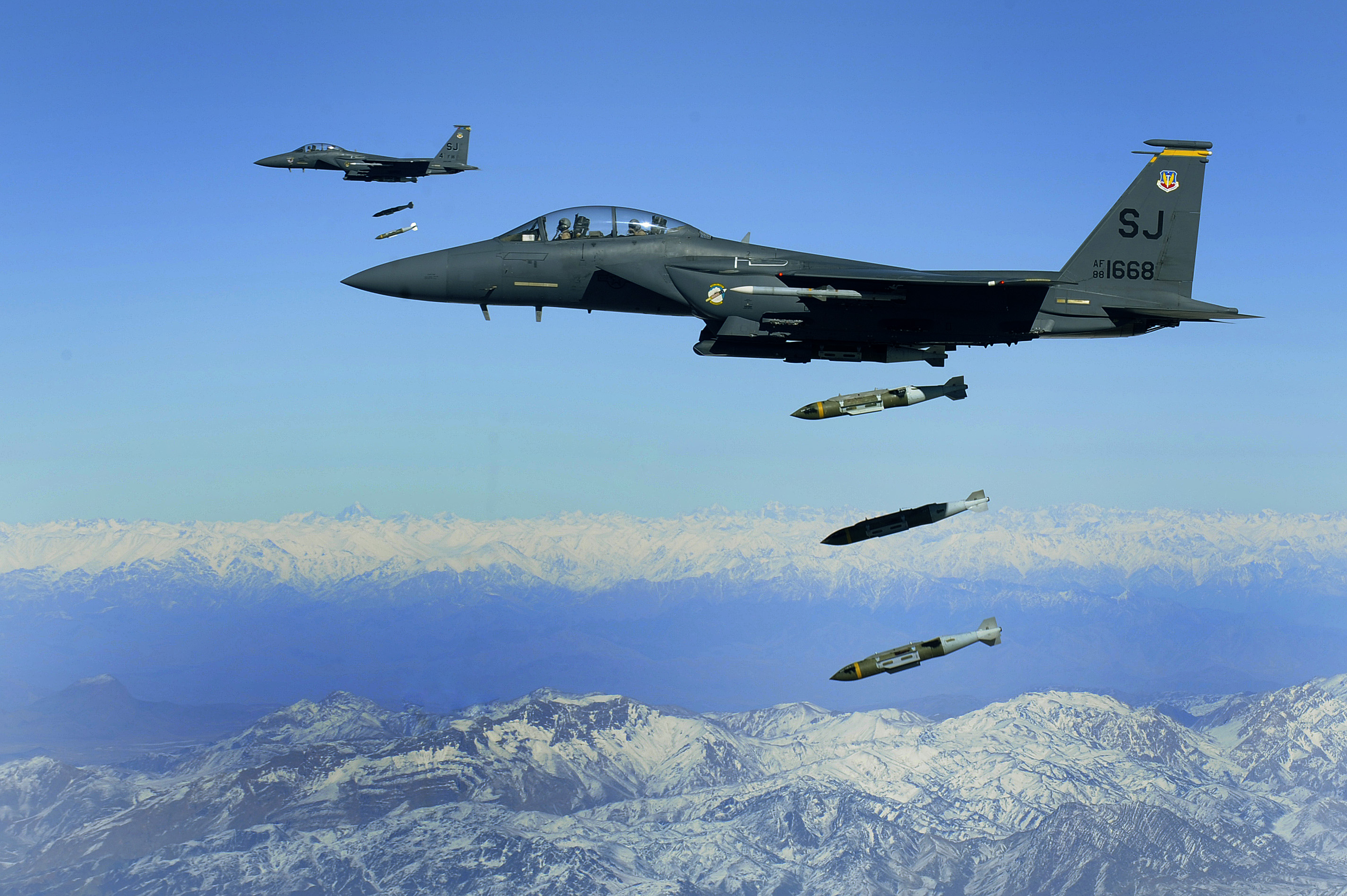
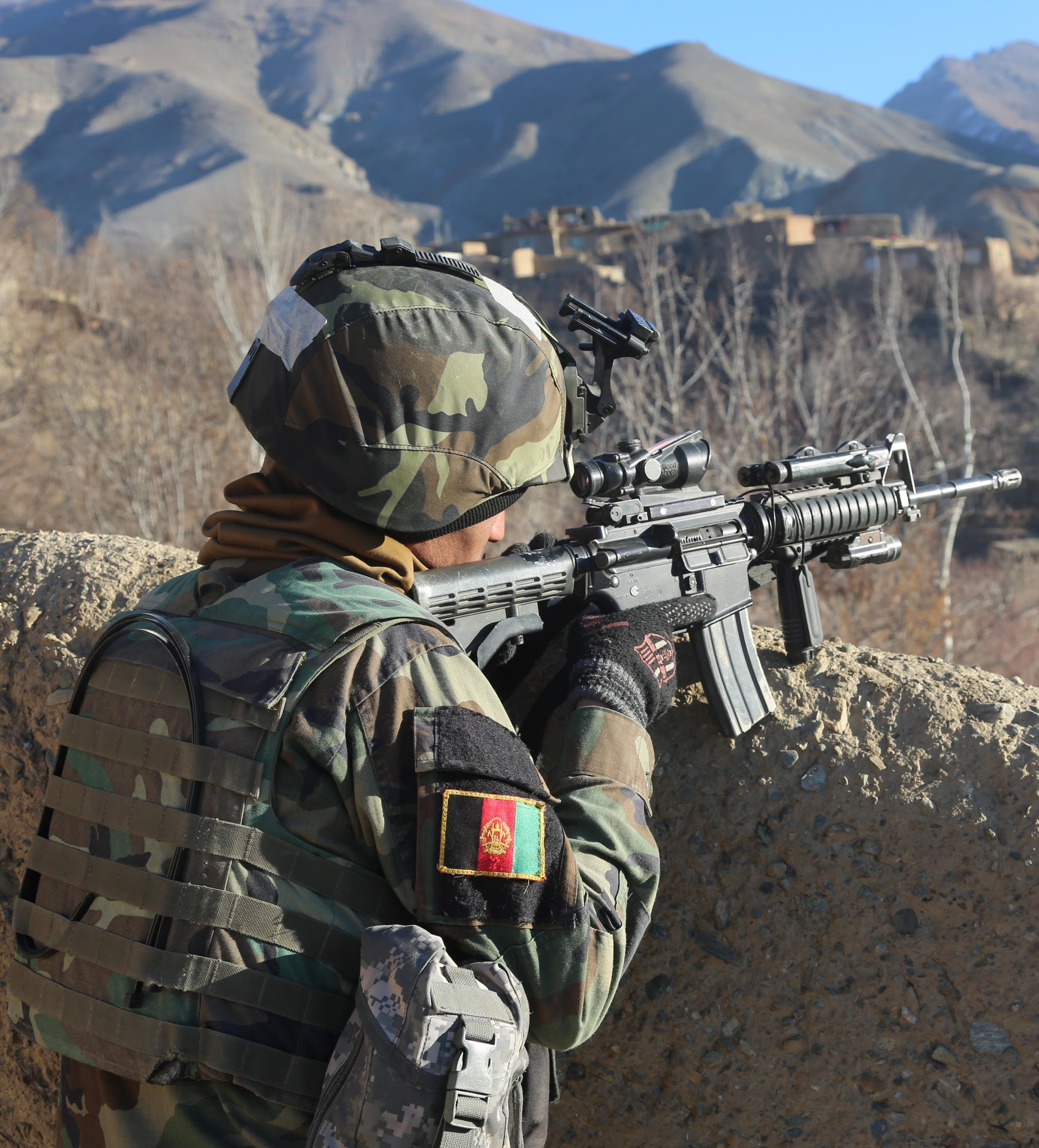
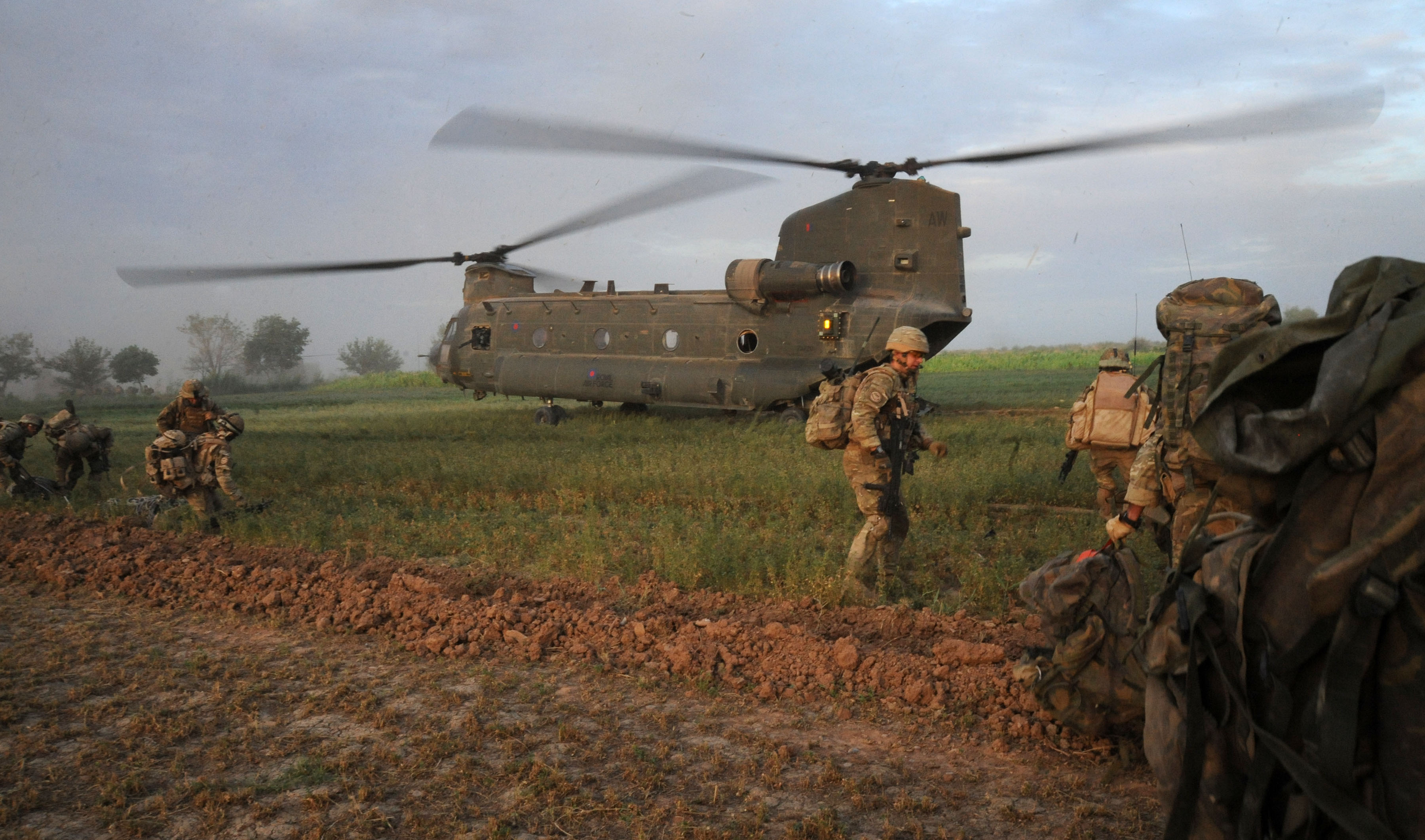
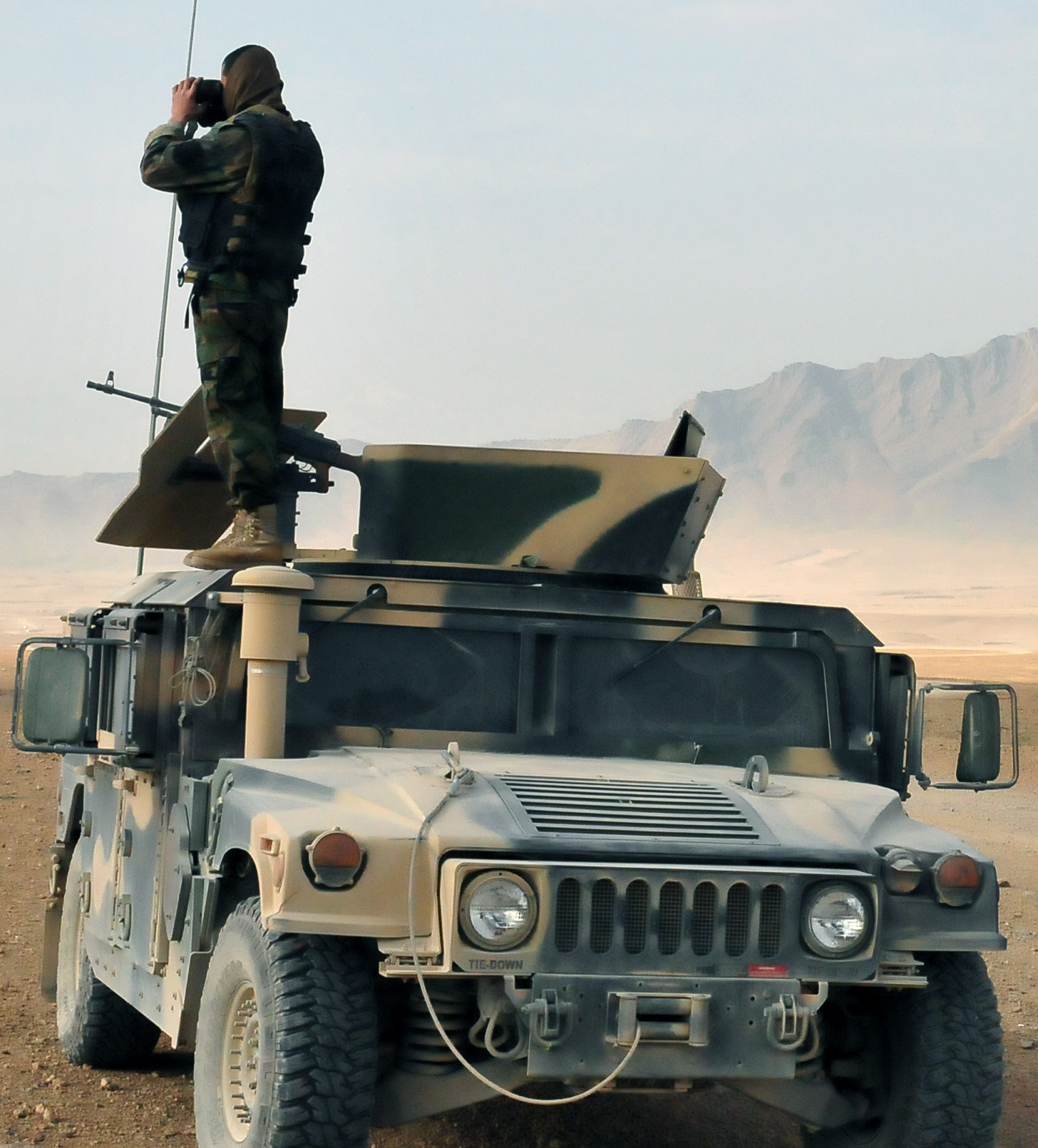
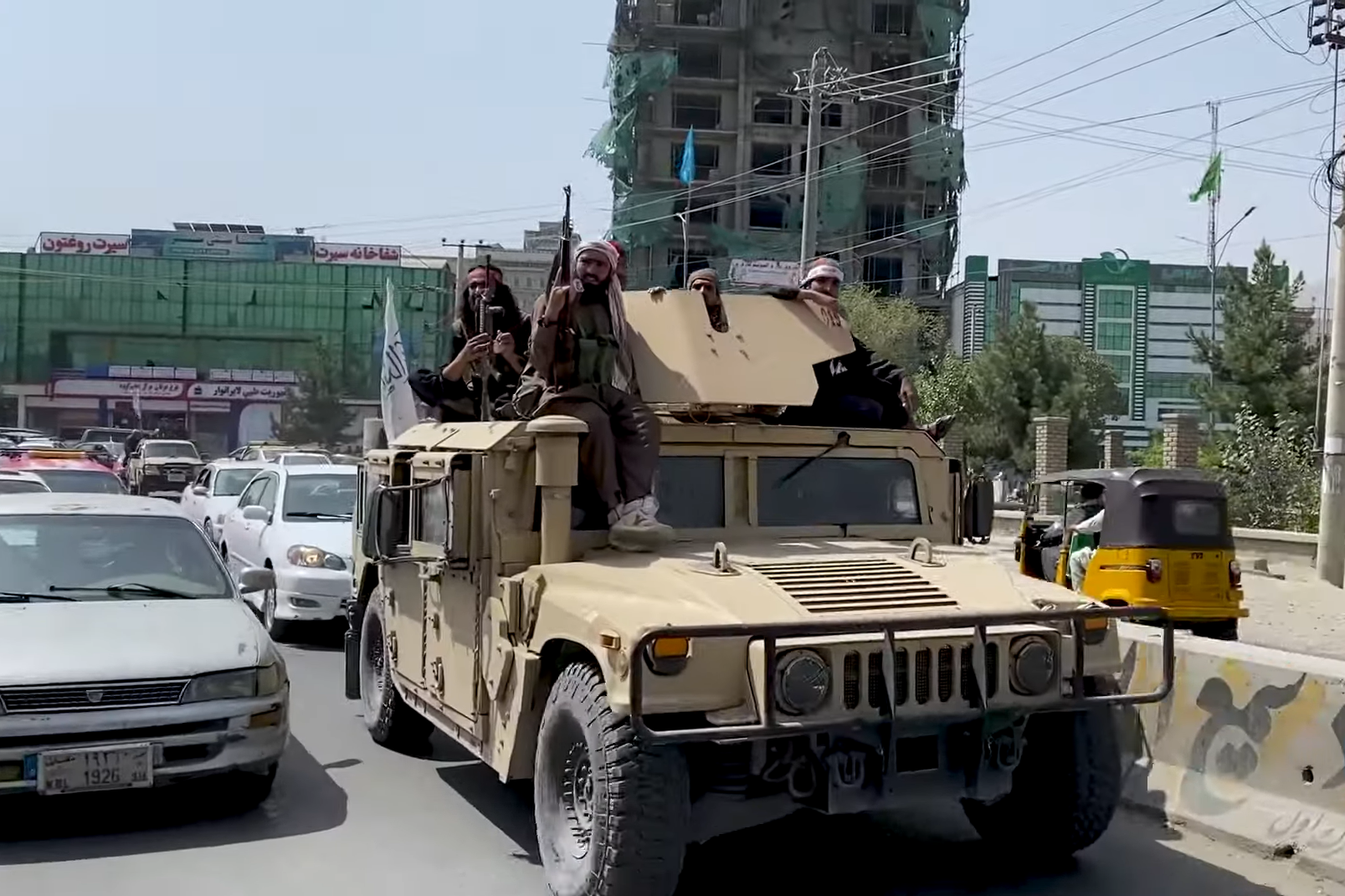
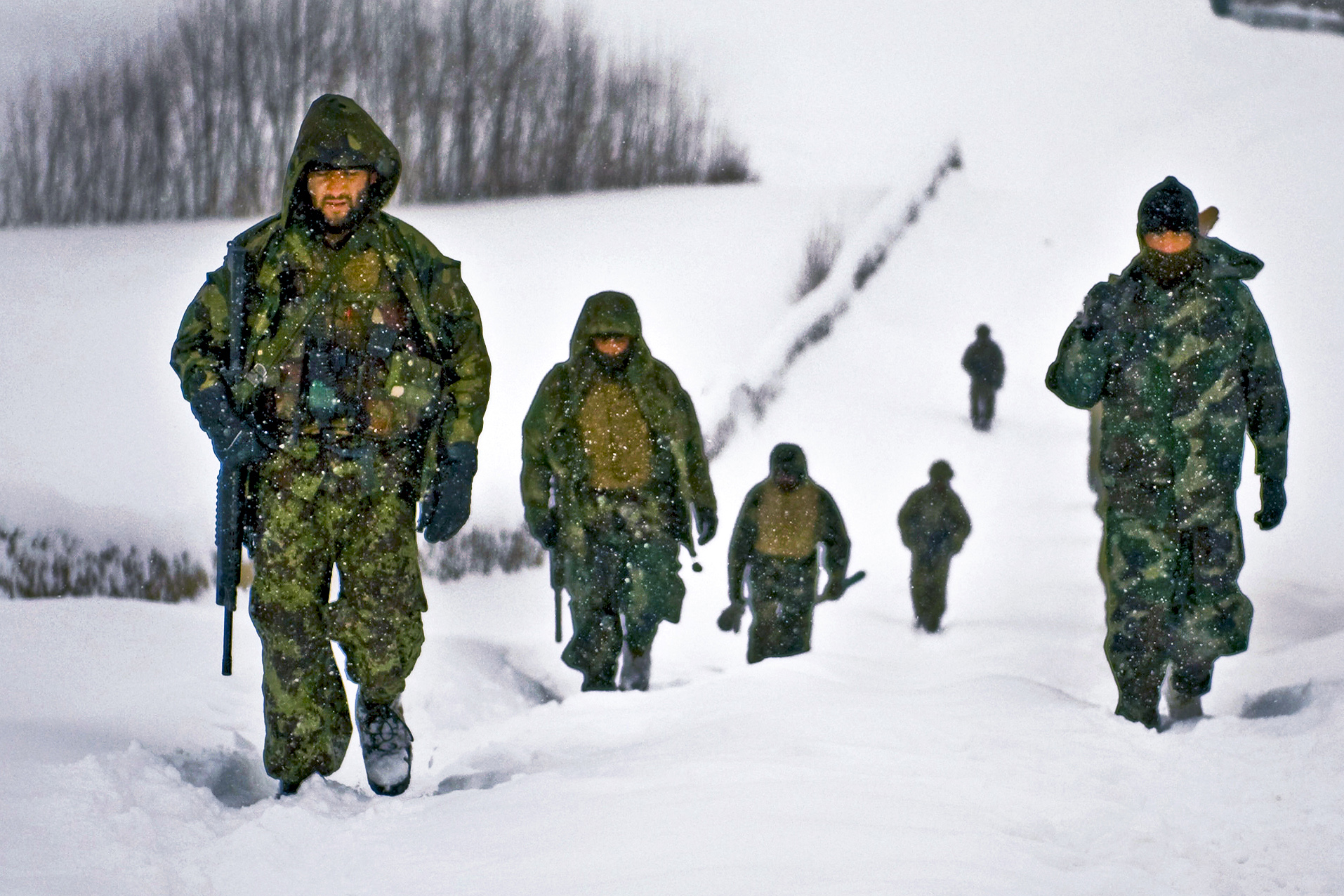
- Clockwise from top-left: American troops in a firefight with Taliban insurgents in Kunar Province; An American F-15E Strike Eagle dropping 2,000-pound JDAMs on a cave in eastern Afghanistan; an Afghan soldier surveying atop a Humvee; Afghan and American soldiers move through snow in Logar Province; victorious Taliban fighters after securing Kabul; an Afghan soldier surveying a valley in Parwan Province; British troops preparing to board a Chinook during Operation Black Prince
Date	7 October 2001 – 30 August 2021 (19 years, 10 months, 3 weeks and 2 days)
Location	Afghanistan (Note: Bordering areas of Pakistan were also affected (War in North-West Pakistan), and was considered for some time to be a single theater of operations by the United States (AfPak).)
Result	Taliban victory (see Aftermath)
Territorial changes	Taliban control over Afghanistan increases compared to pre-intervention territory

Belligerents
Invasion (2001): United States; Northern Alliance; United Kingdom; France; Canada; Italy; Germany; Australia; New Zealand; Iran	Invasion (2001): Islamic Emirate of Afghanistan; Taliban; Haqqani network; Non-state allies: Al-Qaeda; 055 Brigade; IMU; TNSM; JTJ
Insurgency (2001–2021): Islamic State of Afghanistan (2001–2002); Afghan Transitional Authority (2002–2004); Islamic Republic of Afghanistan (2004–2021); ISAF (2001–2014; 51 countries); United States; United Kingdom; Canada; Germany; Australia; Italy; New Zealand; France; Turkey; Georgia (country); Jordan; Bulgaria; Poland; Romania; Spain; Czech Republic; North Macedonia; Denmark; Armenia; Azerbaijan; Finland; Croatia; Hungary; Norway; Lithuania; Mongolia; United Arab Emirates; Belgium; Portugal; Slovakia; Netherlands; Montenegro; Latvia; Sweden; Albania; Ukraine; Bosnia–Herzegovina; Greece; Ireland; Iceland; Estonia; Austria; Malaysia; Slovenia; Colombia; Switzerland; Bahrain; El Salvador; Luxembourg; South Korea; Tonga; Singapore; Resolute Support (2015–2021; 36 countries); High Council of the Islamic Emirate of Afghanistan (allegedly; from 2015); Khost Protection Force and other pro-government paramilitaries	Insurgency (2001–2021): Taliban; Haqqani network (from 2002); Al-Qaeda; AQIS; TJA; Taliban splinter groups; Dadullah Front (from 2012); Fidai Mahaz (from 2013); Other allies: Hezb-e-Islami Gulbuddin (intermittently until 2016); Islamic Jihad Union (from 2002); Islamic Movement of Uzbekistan (until 2015); Turkistan Islamic Party; Lashkar-e-Jhangvi; Pakistani Taliban; Lashkar-e-Islam; Islamic State (from 2015); ISIL–KP; IMU

Commanders and leaders
List: (Islamic Republic of Afghanistan) Hamid Karzai; (Islamic Republic of Afghanistan) Ashraf Ghani (surrendered); (United States) George W. Bush; (United States) Barack Obama; (United States) Donald Trump; (United States) Joe Biden; (United States) Donald Rumsfeld; (United States) Robert Gates; (United States) Leon Panetta; (United States) Chuck Hagel; (United States) Ash Carter; (United States) Jim Mattis; (United States) Lloyd Austin; (United Kingdom) Tony Blair; (United Kingdom) Gordon Brown; (United Kingdom) David Cameron; (United Kingdom) Theresa May; (United Kingdom) Boris Johnson; (United Kingdom) Geoff Hoon; (United Kingdom) Liam Fox; (United Kingdom) Philip Hammond; (United Kingdom) Michael Fallon; (United Kingdom) Ben Wallace; (Canada) Jean Chrétien; (Canada) Paul Martin; (Canada) Stephen Harper; (Canada) Justin Trudeau; (Germany) Gerhard Schröder; (Germany) Angela Merkel; (Australia) John Howard; (Australia) Kevin Rudd; (Australia) Julia Gillard; (Australia) Tony Abbott; (Australia) Malcolm Turnbull; (Australia) Scott Morrison; (Italy) Silvio Berlusconi; (Italy) Romano Prodi; (Italy) Mario Monti; (Italy) Enrico Letta; (Italy) Matteo Renzi; (Italy) Paolo Gentiloni; (Italy) Giuseppe Conte; (Italy) Mario Draghi; (New Zealand) Helen Clark; (New Zealand) John Key; (New Zealand) Bill English; (New Zealand) Jacinda Ardern; Kenneth F. McKenzie Jr.; John F. Campbell; List of former ISAF Commanders; List of former RS Commanders; Nangialai †; Abdul Manan Niazi †	List: Mullah Omar #; Akhtar Mansour X; Hibatullah Akhundzada; Obaidullah Akhund (POW) #; Jalaluddin Haqqani #; Sirajuddin Haqqani; Mullah Yaqoob; Abdul Ghani Baradar; Osama bin Laden X; Ayman al-Zawahiri; Mohammed Atef X; Asim Umar †; Muhammad Rasul; Haji Najibullah; Shahab al-Muhajir; Hafiz Saeed Khan †; Mawlavi Habib Ur Rahman; Abdul Haseeb Logari †; Abdul Rahman Ghaleb †; Abu Saad Erhabi †; Abdullah Orokzai (POW); Qari Hekmat †; Mufti Nemat (surrendered); Dawood Ahmad Sofi †; Mohamed Zahran †; Ishfaq Ahmed Sofi †

Strength
ISAF: 130,000+ (peak strength); ANDSF: 307,947 (peak strength; January 2021); Resolute Support: 17,178 (peak strength; October 2019); Defence contractors: 117,227 (peak strength; Q2 2012); HCIEA: 3,000–3,500; Khost Protection Force: 3,000–10,000 (2018)	Taliban: 58,000–100,000 (2021); Haqqani network: 4,000–15,000 (2009); HIG: 1,500–2,000+ (2014); al-Qaeda: c. 300 in 2016 (c. 3,000 in 2001); Fidai Mahaz: 8,000 (2013); ISIL–KP: 3,500–4,000 (2018, in Afghanistan)

Casualties and losses
Afghan security forces: 66,000–92,000 killed; Northern Alliance: 200 killed; Coalition: Dead: 3,579; United States: 2,330; United Kingdom: 457; Canada: 159; France: 90; Germany: 62; Italy: 53; Others: 338; Wounded: 23,536; United States: 20,093; United Kingdom: 2,188; Canada: 2,071 (Note: Per figures released by Canadian Department of National Defence in June 2013, 635 were listed as WIA (wounded in action) while 1,436 were listed as NBI (non-battle injuries).); Contractors; Dead: 3,917; Wounded: 15,000+; Total killed: 73,696–99,696	Taliban insurgents: 52,893–80,000+ killed (2,000+ al-Qaeda fighters); ISIL–KP: 2,400+ killed
- Civilians killed: 46,319; Total killed: 176,206 (per Costs of War Project); 212,191+ (per UCDP); Total killed in related insurgency in Pakistan: 66,650
- ^{a} The continued list includes nations who have contributed fewer than 200 troops as of November 2014.; ^{b} The continued list includes nations who have contributed fewer than 200 troops as of May 2017.

The following items form a partial timeline of the War in Afghanistan. For events prior to October 7, 2001, see 2001 in Afghanistan.

== 2001 ==
- October 7: (9 p.m. local time): the United States, supported by Britain, begins its attack on Afghanistan, launching bombs and cruise missiles against Taliban military and communications facilities and suspected terrorist training camps. Kabul, Kandahar, and Herat were hit.
- October 9: A cruise missile kills four U.N. demining employees and injures four others in a building several miles east of Kabul.
- October 19: Airborne invasion into Afghanistan by Rangers of the Third Ranger Battalion, Seventy Fifth Ranger Regiment and others seizing a Qandahar airfield named Objective Rhino.
- October 26: Afghan mujahedeen commander Abdul Haq killed by the Taliban.
- November 6: Zari, Keshendeh and Aq-Kupruk fall to the Northern Alliance
- November 8: Pakistan, being the only nation that still had diplomatic ties to the Taliban, asked Afghanistan's rulers to close their consulate in the city of Karachi.
- November 9: Battle of Mazari Sharif.
- November 10: The Taliban and Northern Alliance fighters both claimed that the strategic northern Afghan city of Mazari Sharif was taken by Northern Alliance fighters.
- November 11: Journalists Pierre Billaud, Johanne Sutton, and Volker Handloik are ambushed and killed.
- November 12: Taliban forces abandon Kabul ahead of advancing Northern Alliance troops.
  - 2001 uprising in Herat.
- November 14: Northern Alliance fighters took over Kabul, the Afghan capital, and then controlled virtually all the north of Afghanistan.
- November 16: Mohammed Atef, the military chief of al-Qaeda, killed in a US airstrike.
- November 19: Four foreign journalists - Harry Burton, Maria Grazia Cutuli, Azizullah Haidari, and Julio Fuentes – were ambushed and killed.
- November 25: Northern Alliance gained control of Kunduz, the last Taliban stronghold in Northern Afghanistan, but only after Pakistani aircraft rescue several thousand Taliban and Al-Qaeda fighters and their military advisers. The Taliban then controlled less than 25% of the country, mainly around Kandahar in the south.
  - U.S. Marines landed in force by helicopter at Camp Rhino south of Kandahar and began preparing it for fixed wing aircraft. They also occupied the main road between Kandahar and Pakistan.
  - Battle of Qala-i-Jangi. Forces loyal to bin Laden smuggled weapons into their prison near Mazar i Sharif after surrendering at Kunduz. They attacked the Northern Alliance guards and storm an armory. U.S. Special Forces call in air attacks. Hundreds of prisoners are killed as well as 40 Alliance fighters and one U.S. CIA operative, Johnny Michael Spann. Spann becomes the first U.S. and Coalition combat casualty. A young American named John Walker Lindh is found in the midst of the rebellion and extradited to the US on terrorism charges.
- December 6: Kandahar falls.
- December: The Battle of Tora Bora against Taliban and al-Qaeda fighters; Osama bin Laden reportedly escapes during this battle.
- December: The Dasht-i-Leili massacre, where hundreds of Taliban were allegedly suffocated to death while being transported in metal containers.
- December: The Bonn Agreement establishes the postwar system of government for Afghanistan, and establishes the International Security Assistance Force.
- December 22: The interim Afghan government is sworn in.

== 2002 ==
- January 4: First US soldier dies due to hostile fire, Sergeant First Class (SFC) Nathan Chapman.
- January 24, the Hazar Qadam raid sees Americans accidentally attack an allied compound collecting weapons for their Karzai government
- February 14: Abdul Rahman, Afghan Aviation and Tourism Minister, killed by angry Hajj pilgrims.
- March 1: Operation Anaconda against al-Qaeda fighters launched.
- April 17: The 87-year-old exiled king of Afghanistan, Mohammed Zahir Shah, returns.
- April 18: Tarnak Farm incident leaves four Canadians dead from friendly fire.
- June 11: King Zahir Shah opens the first post-Taliban loya jirga.
- July 1: In Uruzgan province, a US AC-130 gunship struck a wedding party, killing 48 civilians and injuring 117. The United States claimed their plane had come under attack from anti-aircraft fire before the strike.
- July 6: Vice President Abdul Qadir assassinated in Kabul.
- September 5: 2002 Kabul bombing kills 30 people.

== 2003 ==
- August 11 – NATO officially takes command of peacekeeping in Afghanistan.
- December 14 – 2003 loya jirga convened to consider the proposed Afghan Constitution.

== 2004 ==
- January 4 – Constitution approved by Loya Jirga.
- January 26 – Constitution signed by President Hamid Karzai.
- October 9 – 2004 Afghan presidential election. In the country's first direct election, Hamid Karzai wins the presidency with 55.4% of the vote.

== 2005 ==
- June 28: Operation Red Wings results in the death of 19 Americans and many Taliban fighters.
- July: Prisoner abuses took place at Forward Operating Base Ripley. Two soldiers would eventually be sentenced for their actions in the July 2005 Afghan captive incident.
- September 18: 2005 Afghan parliamentary election.

== 2006 ==
- January 13: Damadola airstrike by US in Pakistan kills at least 18 civilians.
- February 1: The Afghanistan Compact is developed, establishing a framework of international cooperation with Afghanistan.
- March 29: Battle of Lashkagar. Taliban fighters attack a NATO base.
- April 14: Beginning of the 2006 Taliban offensive.
- May 15: Operation Mountain Thrust is launched, the largest offensive since the fall of the Taliban.
- July: Battle of Panjwaii between Canadian NATO forces and the Taliban.
- September 2: Canadians launch Operation Medusa.
- September 16: Operation Mountain Fury, end of the 2006 Taliban offensive.
- October 7: Death of Karen Fischer and Christian Struwe

== 2007 ==
- February 27: 2007 Bagram Air Base bombing during US Vice President Dick Cheney’s visit.
- March 4: 2007 Shinwar shooting occurs in which an unknown amount of civilians are killed by US troops.
- March 6: Operation Achilles against the Taliban in Helmand Province.
- May 12: Mullah Dadullah killed.
- May 13: Afghanistan–Pakistan Skirmishes.
- June 15: Battle of Chora begins.
- June 22: 2007 Helmand Province airstrikes conducted by NATO kill 45 Afghan civilians.
- June 28: The Hyderabad airstrike kills a large number of civilians including women and children.
- July 19: 2007 South Korean hostage crisis in Afghanistan begins.
- August 16: Nangar Khel massacre - Eight civilians including a pregnant women and a baby died when Polish soldiers shelled the village of Nangar Khel. Seven soldiers have been charged with war crimes.
- November 6: 2007 Baghlan sugar factory bombing kills 75, including six Afghan MPs.
- December 7: Battle of Musa Qala, a major clash in Helmand Province.

== 2008 ==
- January 14: The 2008 Kabul Serena Hotel attack leaves six people dead.
- February 17: 2008 Kandahar bombing kills 100 people, the deadliest suicide bombing of the war.
- June 10: Gora Prai airstrike in Pakistan kills 11 Pakistani paramilitary troops.
- June 13: Sarposa Prison attack. Taliban attack the Sarposa Prison, freeing up to 1,000 prisoners.
- July 6: Haska Meyna wedding party airstrike kills 47 civilians, mostly women and children, in Nangarhar province.
- July 7: The 2008 Indian embassy bombing in Kabul kills 58, including four Indians. India blames Pakistan's Inter-Services Intelligence for the attack.
- July 13: Battle of Wanat. Taliban fighters attack a NATO base, killing nine American soldiers.
- August 19: The Taliban kill 10 French soldiers in the Uzbin valley ambush.
- August 22: Azizabad airstrike kills up to 92 Afghan civilians.
- August 27: Operation Eagle's Summit begins in Helmand Province.
- September: United States-Pakistan skirmishes.
- September 3: Angoor Ada raid by US special forces into Pakistan.
- November 3: Wech Baghtu wedding party attack kills 37 civilians, mostly women and children.
- December 19: US vows to send 3,000 more troops to Afghanistan.

== 2009 ==
- January 1: Shaghzay ambush
- February 11: February 2009 Kabul raids
- May 4: The Granai airstrike resulted in one of the highest civilian death tolls from Western military action since foreign forces invaded Afghanistan in 2001.
- July 2: Operation Khanjar begins
- September 4: NATO planes attacks two fuel tankers, which had been hijacked by Taliban insurgents. Up to 142 people died in the attack, including over 100 Afghan civilian victims.
- December 1: U.S. President Barack Obama announces Afghanistan War troop surge of 2009.
- December 16: Operation Septentrion, assault by 1100 soldiers (mostly French) in the Uzbin Valley.
- December 29: 10 Afghan civilians mostly school children killed by special operation forces in the botched Narang night raid.

== 2010 ==
- January 15: The first of the Maywand District murders occurs on this date.
- February 12: Five innocent civilians including two pregnant women and a teenage girl killed in the botched Khataba raid.
- February 21: Uruzgan helicopter attack kills 27-33 civilians including four women and a child in Uruzgan province.
- Spring: Operation Moshtarak Phase I is led by US Marines to retake Marjah, in Helmand Province, from the Taliban.
- Spring-Summer: U.S. Surge to Afghanistan sees its peak, as 20,000 soldiers are deployed to the south
- June 23: General Stanley A. McChrystal, commander of the ISAF, resigns after controversial comments critical of the Obama administration were published in a magazine.
- July 23: The Sangin airstrike kills a large number of Afghan civilians mostly women and children in Nangarhar province.
- July 25: WikiLeaks releases 90,000 leaked documents pertaining to the war in Afghanistan.
- September 18: Afghan Parliamentary Elections are held, widely criticized as fraudulent, although with notable instances of electoral institution impartiality.
- October 17: A US soldier murders a Taliban prisoner.
- Fall: Operation Moshtarak Phases II and III are held in Kandahar, driving the Taliban out of traditional safe-havens
- Fall: Command of Regional Command South rotates from British to American command.

== 2011 ==
- January 26: The Afghan National Assembly is inaugurated.
- March 1: Mano Gai airstrike occurs in which NATO troops kill 9 minors.
- May 1: The number one Al-Qaeda leader Osama bin Laden is killed by U.S. Navy SEALs in Abbottabad, Pakistan, just miles from Islamabad.
- May 23: 4 U.S. soldiers (2nd Battalion 27th Infantry Regiment) die and 1 wounded following an improvised explosive device attack in Kunar province.
- June 4–6: The Battle Of Gewi Ridge takes place where a platoon of U.S. soldiers air-assaulted the mountain ridge of Gewi (Kunar province) for over-watch of a major re-supply convoy. Following the insertion, an intensive firefight lasting 52 hours takes place, resulting in the deaths of 50+ Taliban insurgents.
- August 6: A CH-47 Chinook helicopter transporting 30 U.S. soldiers (including 17 Navy SEALs), 1 civilian interpreter and 7 Afghan troops is shot down in Wardak Province by RPG-wielding Taliban insurgents. There were no survivors of the crash. This incident marks the deadliest day for U.S. Forces in Afghanistan since the invasion in 2001.
- August 11: Vengeance is exacted on the 11 Taliban militants involved in downing the CH-47 Chinook, who are killed in an F-16 airstrike. Meanwhile, five ISAF service members die following an improvised explosive device attack in the southern provinces.
- September 20: Burhanuddin Rabbani, the former president and head of the High Peace Council, was assassinated by Taliban suicide bombers in Kabul.
- November 26: 2011 NATO attack in Pakistan occurs in which 28 Pakistani soldiers are killed at the Durand Line, although it's disputed which side instigated the event.
- December 9: Mohammed Ishmael, Ghaziabad district (Kunar province) police chief is killed in a suicide bombing of a mosque carried out by a 12-year-old Pakistani boy.

== 2012 ==
- January 12: Footage surfaces in what is known as the Video of U.S. Marines urinating on Taliban fighters.
- February 8: 2012 Kapisa airstrike occurs in which NATO forces kill 7 children and 1 adult.
- March 11: American soldier Robert Bales commits the Kandahar massacre in which he murdered 16 Afghan civilians, and injured a further 6.
- August 7: Shesh Aba raid committed by British forces kills 4 civilians.

== 2013 ==
The army of the United States continues to conduct missions throughout Afghanistan, began closing forward operating bases (FOB).

== 2014 ==
- June 9: 2014 Gaza Valley airstrike kills 5 American soldiers in a friendly-fire incident.

== 2015 ==
- October 3: Kunduz hospital airstrike occurs in which 42 civilians are killed at the Kunduz Trauma Centre due to an airstrike.

== 2016 ==
- December 31: United States troops withdraw from Afghanistan after 15 years.

== 2017 ==
- February 10: 2017 Sangin airstrike kills at least 18 civilians.
- April 9: The first Battle of Darzab begins.
- April 13: 2017 Nangarhar airstrike kills 96 militants.

== 2018 ==
- July 12: The second Battle of Darzab begins.

== 2020 ==
- February 29: Doha Agreement is signed between the Taliban and the United States.

== 2021 ==
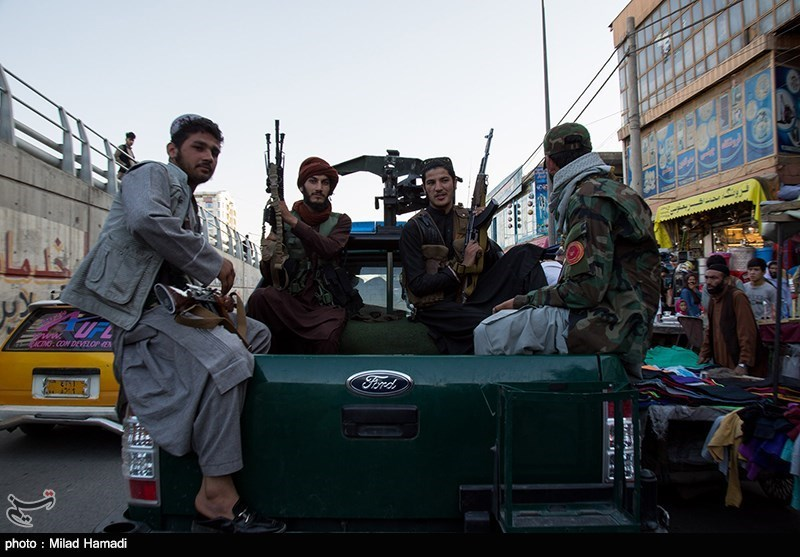
Taliban militants patrolling Kabul in September 2021

- May 1: The Taliban begins its summer offensive.
- August 6: The Taliban capture Zaranj.
- August 13: Battle of Lashkargah concludes with a Taliban victory. Herat falls. Battle of Kandahar ends with Taliban victory.
- August 15: The Taliban capture Kabul. The Islamic Republic collapses as the Taliban begins reinstating the Islamic Emirate. An international airlift of refugees begins.
- August 26: A suicide bombing at Kabul International Airport left 182 people dead, among them 13 US servicemen who were part of the airlift operation.
- September 6: The capital of Panjshir Province, Bazarak and other districts fall, but the Resistance continues fighting guerrilla war.

== See also ==
- 2006: Coalition combat operations in Afghanistan in 2006
- 2007: Coalition combat operations in Afghanistan in 2007
- 2008: Coalition combat operations in Afghanistan in 2008
