= Hyderabad airstrike =

Civilians killing by the United States Army

| Date | June 28, 2007 |
| Location | Hyderabad village, Gerishk District, Helmand province, Afghanistan |
| Result | estimated 100-130 people killed, 35-85 Taliban fighter, 45-100 civilians including women and children, about 23-40 civilians wounded |

Hyderabad airstrike refers to the killing of many Afghan civilians including women and children in the village of Hyderabad, Gerishk District, Helmand province, Afghanistan on June 28, 2007 by the United States Army.

The airstrikes occurred after Taliban forces ambushed a combined US-Afghan army force in Hyderabad and destroyed two US military vehicles with mines. A firefight ensued and US-Afghan forces called in airstrikes in response to heavy small arms and mortar fire. Coalition spokesperson Major Chris Belcher stated the airstrikes targeted Taliban firing positions in the village.

The numbers of casualties vary depending on the source. Some give total numbers as high as 130 with up to 80-100 civilians killed.

President Hamid Karzai ordered an investigation. Residents of the town of Hyderabad claimed that from 45 to 65 civilians were killed. An investigation by the Afghan government concluded that 45 civilians including women and children had been killed. Village elders say another 23 civilians were wounded in the attack.

== See also ==
- Azizabad airstrike 78-92 civilians mostly children killed in Herat province, 2008
- Deh Bala wedding party bombing 47 civilians mostly children killed in Nangarhar province, 2008
- Narang night raid 10 Afghan civilians mostly school boys were killed on December 27, 2009.
- Granai airstrike 86-145 civilians, mostly children killed in Farah province, 2009
- Uruzgan helicopter attack 27-33 civilians killed in Orūzgān province, 2010
