= Wech Baghtu wedding party airstrike =

Mass Murder

Wech Baghtu Wedding Party Massacre
- Shah Wali Kot (Afghanistan)
Date	3 November 2008
Location	Wech Baghtu village, Shah Wali Kot District, Kandahar province, Afghanistan
Result	37 civilians killed including 23 children, 10 women, and 4 men, another 27 wounded

The Wech Baghtu wedding party airstrike refers to the killing of about 37 Afghan civilians, mostly women and children, and injuring about 27 others by a United States military airstrike on 3 November 2008. The group was celebrating a wedding at a housing complex in the village of Wech Baghtu, a Taliban stronghold in the Shah Wali Kot District of Kandahar province, Afghanistan.

The airstrike followed a firefight between US troops and Taliban forces stationed on a mountain behind the wedding party. On 7 November 2008, Afghan officials said a joint investigation found that 37 civilians and 26 insurgents were killed in Wech Baghtu. Wedding parties in Afghanistan are segregated by sex; of the civilians, 23 were children, 10 were women, and 4 were men. Another 27 persons were injured, including the bride. The bombing destroyed the housing complex where women and children had gathered to celebrate.

On 5 November 2008, Afghan President Hamid Karzai responded by demanding that newly-elected US President Barack Obama end civilian deaths, stating, "Our demand is that there will be no civilian casualties in Afghanistan. We cannot win the fight against terrorism with airstrikes – this is my first demand of the new president of the United States – to put an end to civilian casualties."

== See also ==
- Haska Meyna wedding party airstrike
- Granai airstrike
- Azizabad airstrike
- Night raid on Narang
- Uruzgan helicopter attack
- Civilian casualties in the war in Afghanistan (2001–2021)
