= List of civilian casualties in the war in Afghanistan (2009) =

List of civilian casualties in the war in Afghanistan in 2009

- February 12, 2009 – Australian special forces soldiers killed 5 Afghan children in an attack on a compound in the Uruzgan province of southern Afghanistan. It was decided that no charges were to be brought against two Australian soldiers who killed the children.
- March 2009 – A Danish smoke grenade that hit a kitchen during the course of fighting with insurgents flung a little girl against a wall, killing her. The Afghan child's death occurred at the start of March during joint military action with British soldiers in the province of Helmand.
- April 9, 2009 – American-led military forces killed four civilians – a man, a woman, and two children – as well as an unborn baby in an overnight U.S. raid in the eastern province of Khost. The night raid killed the schoolteacher wife of Afghan National Army artillery commander Awal Khan, his 17-year-old daughter Nadia, his 15-year-old son, Aimal, and his brother, who worked for a government department. Another daughter was wounded. The pregnant wife of Khan's cousin, who lived next door, was shot five times in the abdomen, killing her nine-month-old unborn baby. "The coalition has to stop this cruelty and brutal action," a grieving Khan said. The US-led military initially said four people killed by troops were "armed militants", but later admitted that the people killed and wounded were civilians. International humanitarian organisation CARE said in a statement that the slain schoolteacher had been working at a school that it supports. "CARE strongly condemns the action and demands that international military forces operating in Afghanistan are held accountable for their actions and avoid all attacks on innocent civilians in the country."
- May 3, 2009 - Italian troops opened fire after a passenger car was driving at high speed and ignored warning signs in western Afghanistan, killing a 12-year-old Afghan girl and wounding three members of her family.
- May 4, 2009 – American B-1B bombers killed at least two dozen and possibly as many as 147 Afghan civilians in western Afghanistan in what has been called the Granai airstrike. Local Afghan officials in Farah province collected the names of 147 people that were killed in the airstrike. After the Afghan government's investigation, the Afghan Defense Ministry announced an official death toll of 140 villagers. A government list with the names and ages of each of the 140 killed showed that 93 of those killed were children, while only 22 were adult males. A U.S. military investigation, on the other hand, estimated that 26 civilians were killed, but also admitted in its report that they would never be able to determine precisely how many civilians were killed by the operation. The U.S. military report concluded that at least two airstrikes on buildings should not have been ordered, and called for changes in the U.S. military's rules for using airstrikes as well as retraining. The report was also critical of the military for failing to assess battle damage quickly, and called for the creation of an investigative team that can respond within two hours of a reported incident.
- May 19, 2009 – In Lashkar Gah, Helmand Province, southern Afghanistan, Gurkhas mentoring police unit of the Royal Gurkha Rifles, called in British air strike after ambush from a suspected enemy position. A British Harrier II aircraft dropped a laser-guided bomb on the suspected enemy compound which turns out to be unarmed Afghan civilians. Eight Afghan civilians were killed as well as the compound being destroyed.
- September 4, 2009 – As many as 70-90 people, most of them civilians, were killed in northern Kunduz province by a U.S. airstrike called in by German ISAF troops after militants had hijacked two fuel tankers headed from Tajikistan to supply NATO forces. The hijacked tankers got stuck in the mud by Kunduz River near the village of Omar Khel. According to Taliban spokesperson Zabiullah Mujahid, the insurgents opened valves to release fuel and lighten the loads, and villagers swarmed the trucks to collect the fuel despite warnings that they might be hit by an airstrike. According to some Afghan officials, the militants encouraged local people to take advantage of the situation. Word spread quickly and about 500 people from surrounding villages flocked to the trucks. At 2:30 A.M., a U.S. F-15E Strike Eagle fighter jet dropped two 500-pound bombs on the fuel tankers, triggering a huge fireball that incinerated many of the people nearby. Video footage filmed in the morning showed piles of charred bodies lying by the river. An International Committee of the Red Cross (ICRC) team member and others said it was impossible to know how many people had died, with many bodies possibly having been washed away by the river. According to Afghan police, provincial officials, and doctors, most of those killed were civilians.

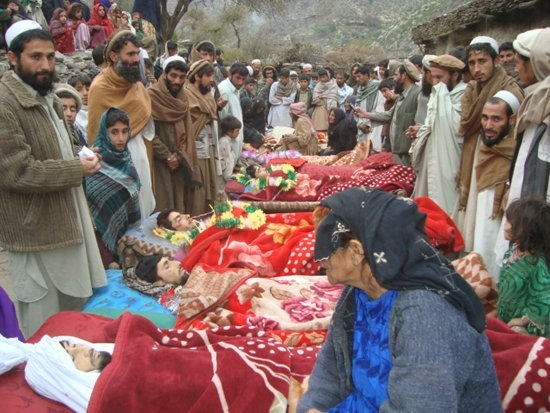
Victims’ of the Narang night raid that killed at least 10 Afghan civilians, including eight schoolchildren.

- September 30, 2009 – The Dutch Defense Ministry said that two Dutch F-16 fighter planes provided air support during what was referred to as "heavy fighting" between British ground troops and the Taliban in Helmand Province. British troops on the ground gave the planes the coordinates of a house from which they were being fired upon. One Dutch F-16 then dropped one precision bomb on the house. "Afterwards it appeared that apart from the Taliban fighters, there were civilians in the house as well. The Taliban had hidden among the civilians," the ministry said. French press agency AFP quoted a local authority saying nine people died, including six children.
- December 25, 2009 – Ten Afghan civilians, including 8 students that were children, were killed by U.S.-led forces during a military operation in the Narang district of Kunar province. The governor of Kunar province said the foreign military operation was launched without the knowledge of government officials in the province. On December 31, Afghan President Hamid Karzai stated that according to the investigative commission in Kunar, the victims had been shot dead in their homes by foreign soldiers. The headmaster of the school attended by the children has stated that 7 of the children had been handcuffed prior to being shot. The Afghan president called upon ISAF to hand the soldiers that were responsible over to Afghan authorities – ISAF did not respond.
- December 31, 2009 – At least 8 Afghan villagers were killed by a US airstrike on a house near the provincial capital Lashkar Gah in Helmand province. Two other villagers were also injured by the airstrike.`
- 2009 UN Report – A UN report issued in February 2010 said that of 346 Afghan children killed in 2009, more than half were killed by NATO forces.

== See also ==
- Civilian casualties in the War in Afghanistan (2001–present)
