= 2009 Kunduz airstrike =

Civilian casualty event during the War in Afghanistan

Coordinates: 36.6146°N 68.8778°E

Kunduz airstrike
- Part of the War in Afghanistan (2001–2021)
- Type: Aerial attack (two GBU-38/500lb bombs)
- Location: Kunduz City, Kunduz province, Afghanistan
- Target: Two fuel tankers
- Date: September 4, 2009
- Executed by: USAF F-15E, called in by German forces.
- Casualties: Up to 200, with over 100 civilians killed

The 2009 Kunduz airstrike took place on Friday 4 September 2009 at roughly 2:30 am local time, 7 km (4.3 mi) southwest of Kunduz City, Kunduz province in northern Afghanistan. Responding to a call by German forces, an American F-15E fighter jet struck two fuel tankers, killing over 100 civilians in the attack.

Because of the high civilian death toll, the airstrike had political repercussions, especially in Germany. In June 2010, Germany announced it would pay $5,000 to each of the families of over 100 civilian victims as an ex gratia payment without admitting liability. The former Afghan Commerce Minister Amin Farhang described the $5,000—equivalent to about 20,000 Afghanis—as a "laughable" sum. Earlier, in February 2010, Germany had reclassified the Afghanistan deployment as an "armed conflict within the parameters of international law", allowing German forces to act without risk of prosecution under German law.

== Stolen tankers ==
Kunduz province, the site of the airstrike, was largely peaceful until Taliban militants started infiltrating the area in 2009. Critics blamed the Germans for allowing the infiltration of the north by the Taliban, although in fact there had been a Taliban presence in the area since the late 1990s and several major battles were fought against them in the area during the US/Northern Alliance invasion in 2001. The Germans insisted that they were taking a more aggressive stance and that they had killed or captured a number of insurgents in recent times. The events leading up to the American airstrike early Friday morning began the previous evening, as two fuel tankers were transporting fuel from Tajikistan into Afghanistan for NATO along the Northern Distribution Network. According to The Daily Telegraph, it was roughly 22:00 local time when they were approached by a group of Taliban and Chechens (apparently foreign volunteers), who killed several of the tanker drivers by beheading them and seized their vehicles. According to the Taliban version of events, they later opened the tankers up to looters to siphon fuel after one vehicle became immobilized in mud at a river crossing. It was at this point that the tankers were located by an American B-1B, and two F-15E Strike Eagles were dispatched there.

== Airstrike ==
With video of the scene being transmitted from the F-15Es, German Oberst (Colonel) Georg Klein was told by an intelligence officer in contact with a sole informant that all the people around the stationary tankers were insurgents. The German commander ordered that 500-pound GBU-38 bombs be dropped onto each of the two trucks at 2:30 am.

The bombs struck two minutes later, blowing up the oil tankers in a fireball that incinerated many of those around. The video in the German tactical operations center showed a huge mushroom cloud blanketing the area and revealed only a few fleeing survivors out of the 100 or so people that had previously been present on the screen. Abdul Malek, one of the truck drivers, was sitting approximately 50 meters from the attack and later described it in an interview:

At first, there was a loud droning, like what you hear when a generator short-circuits. Then there was a bright flash. I just let myself fall forward and went down underwater. Even from there, I could feel the shock wave. For a few seconds, it was as bright as day. Even the water was heating up. When I came out of the water, the whole area around the tanker trucks was on fire. It looked like the ground was spitting up fire, though it was just the fuel from the trucks. It was unbearably hot. There were bodies lying everywhere; they were completely carbonized. I believe there were about 120 there before the bombing; only a handful survived.

— Abdul Malek, 15 December 2009,

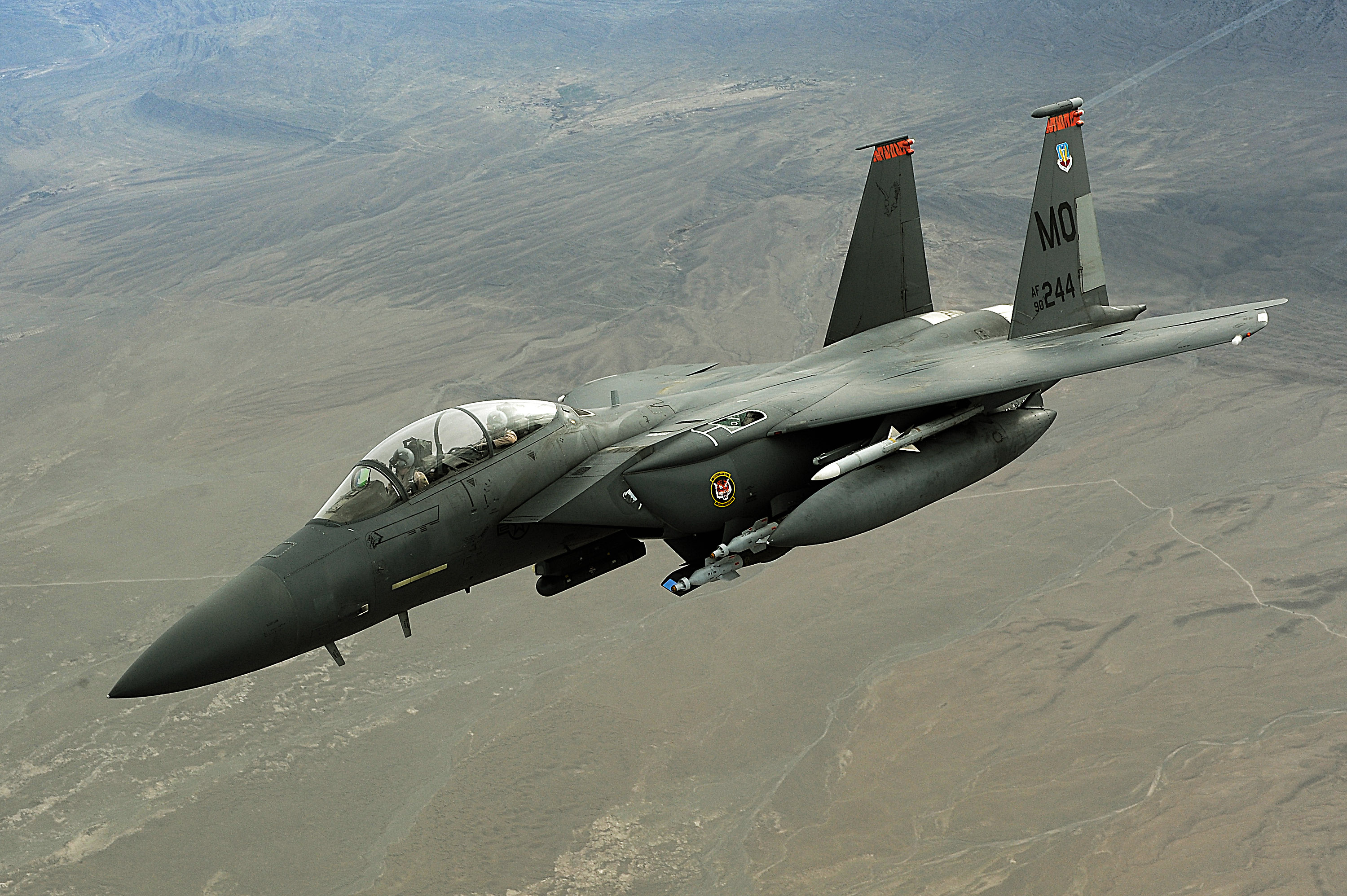
An American F-15E Strike Eagle similar to one used in the attack.

Malek stated that local Taliban had stolen the tankers in order to provide fuel to local villagers, who surrounded the tankers to siphon fuel when the tankers became stuck in the riverbank. By his estimate, between a quarter and a fifth of those present were armed.

It is unknown exactly how many people were killed in the resulting explosions but estimates of the death toll have ranged from 56 to 179. The governor of Kunduz, Mohammad Omar, stated that 90 people had been killed, amongst them a local Taliban commander and four Chechen fighters. An anonymous senior Afghan National Police officer said that around 40 civilians were killed in the blasts. A NATO fact-finding team estimated a day after the incident that about 125 people were killed in the U.S. airstrike, and that at least 24 – but perhaps many more – of those killed had been Afghan civilians. A later German investigation found that up to 142 people died in the attack, including over 100 Afghan civilian victims.

The strike occurred as villagers gathered to collect fuel from the tankers. The governor of Kunduz province was supportive of the ISAF attack and said that Taliban leaders were among the dead. NATO has said its commanders had believed that only insurgents were in the vicinity. German forces had responded to the hijacking of tankers at 12:30 pm and exchanged fire with militants within 40 minutes of arriving, but were unable to reclaim the vehicles.

German forces stated that the strike took place after an unmanned surveillance aircraft had determined that there were no civilians in the area. German officials said the strike took place 40 minutes after the commanders requested it. It is unclear whether civilians began to assemble during that time, but one eyewitness claims that up to 500 people from surrounding villages swarmed the tankers for free fuel.

== Reaction ==
Reaction to the airstrike was mixed. The French, Italian, and Swedish foreign ministers all generally criticized the airstrike, while German Defence Minister Franz Josef Jung emphasized the danger posed by the stolen tankers. General Stanley McChrystal made a statement on Afghan television and visited the site of the bombing the following day; a NATO team charged with investigating the airstrike also arrived at the scene.

In an interview with Le Figaro released on September 7, 2009, Afghan President Hamid Karzai said:

What an error of judgment! More than 90 dead all because of a simple lorry that was, moreover, immobilised in a river bed. Why didn't they send in ground troops to recover the fuel tank?

U.S. Gen. Stanley McChrystal was quoted by CNN as saying, "from what I have seen today in going to the hospital, it's clear to me that there were some civilians that were harmed at that site." Afghan President Hamid Karzai had long been critical of the high civilian death toll caused by the tactics of the NATO International Security Assistance Force. News investigations called it the bloodiest German military action since World War II.

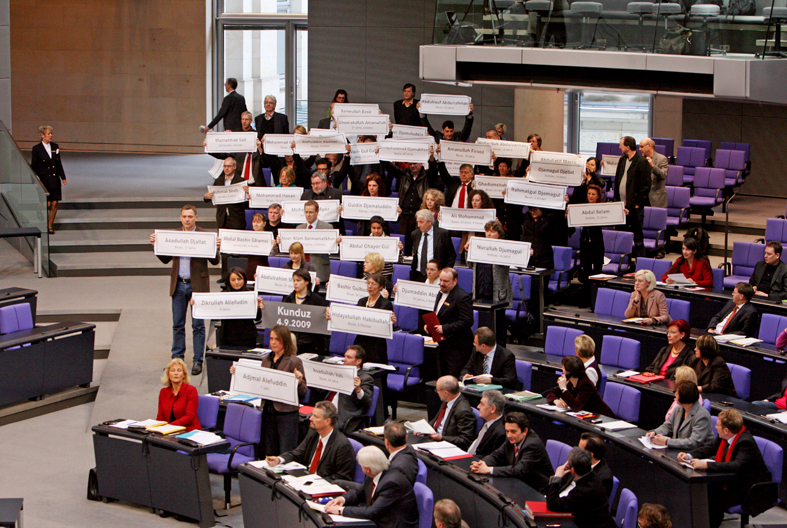
Members of Germany's Left Party hold up the names of the dead during a debate

While initially downplayed by the German government which was busy in an election campaign at the time, the airstrike then dominated political debates in Germany for several months and in November 2009 led to the resignation of German labor minister Franz Josef Jung, who was defense minister during the attack. In early 2010, further material came to light, especially about the political handling in the German government, which brought further pressure on a number of people, including Karl-Theodor zu Guttenberg, the new defense minister. The major German newsweekly Der Spiegel, in an exhaustive research article published in February 2010, called the incident a war crime due to the fact that the attack on the tankers had broken a number of rules of conduct, and had led to a later cover-up.

German public prosecuting authorities investigated the case, but announced on 20 April 2010 that the investigation was concluded and that no criminal proceedings would be initiated against Colonel Klein and Hauptfeldwebel (Master Sergeant) Wilhelm. They stressed that, according to their findings, neither the German penal code nor international criminal code had been violated; it was found that Colonel Klein and the soldiers under his command acted reasonably according to the information available to them at the time. It was explicitly stressed that later findings about the true situation (namely the presence of civilians) could not make the action illegal in retrospective.

In the aftermath of the Kunduz airstrike, pressure from the field and demands from NATO allies led to a strong call for action in the German political arena.

=== Political consequences in Germany ===
On the day of the events, September 4, 2009, the Defence Minister Franz Josef Jung (CDU) defended the attack that was ordered by the German commander Colonel Georg Klein. On 8 September, NATO admitted that there had been a number of civilian casualties. On September 9, a report was made by the German military police (Feldjäger) in which civilian victims are mentioned, including children.

Several German officials initially justified the airstrike: including on October 29, the Germany Army's Chief of Staff, General Wolfgang Schneiderhan and on November 6 the newly appointed Defence Minister Karl-Theodor zu Guttenberg (CSU).

On 26 November, Wolfgang Schneiderhan, and deputy Defence Minister (Verteidigungs-Staatssekretär) Peter Wichert had both resigned over allegations of a cover-up relating to the incident. A local commander was recalled to Germany while the public prosecution authorities investigated if international law had been breached; the commander only had one source of intelligence, who could not see the lorries, which was a violation of the rules of engagement designed to minimise civilian casualties in air attack missions.

On November 27, Franz Josef Jung submitted his resignation as Germany's Minister of Labour and Social Affairs (Bundesarbeitsminister), a position he had accepted after the September federal election, after repeatedly denying civilian deaths in the attack. The political parties SPD, Linke and Grüne announced the forming of an investigation committee.

On December 3, in the German parliament, Guttenberg called the airstrike unjustified. On December 9, the German weekly "Der Stern" published that Guttenberg had received a report of the International Red Cross already on November 6 in which civilian casualties were mentioned.

On December 18, Schneiderhahn was replaced by Volker Wieker.

In February 2010 German Foreign Minister Guido Westerwelle announced the Afghanistan deployment was being reclassified as an "armed conflict within the parameters of international law", which would allow German soldiers based in Afghanistan to act without the risk of being prosecuted under German law.

Colonel Georg Klein on the other hand has been promoted and appointed Brigadier General in 2013.

=== Bundesgerichtshof judges' opinion ===
In 2021 two judges from the German Federal Court of Justice's third senate (which had dismissed damage claims by Afghan families over the incident) wrote a letter to the editor of Neue Juristische Wochenschrift where they complained about the public perception of the affair, describing it as "ultimately based on a Taliban propaganda victory," and decried as highly regrettable how Col. Klein was portrayed in a wrong light as having recklessly ordered a bombing that killed over 100 people, including many civilians and even children. According to their letter, information that had become public in lower courts had been largely ignored by the press, including the confirmed facts that the attacking aircraft had been circling the site at an altitude of only 360 meters for 41 minutes prior to the bombing, and that only around 30 to 40 people were in the vicinity of the tankers when the bombs were dropped; by that point there would not have been any civilians there anymore, and that no more than 12 or 13 people were actually killed.

=== ECHR opinion ===
After many years of unsuccessfully seeking justice in Germany, the case was brought to the European Court of Human Rights on behalf of Abdul Hanan, whose two twelve- and eight-year-old sons, Abdul Bayan and Nesarullah, had been killed in the strike. However, in 2021 the court concluded that the initial investigation, which was performed by the German authorities, complied with the requirements of an effective investigation under Article 2 of the European Convention on Human Rights and no violation of the procedural component of the right to life protection under the Convention was found.

== Casualties ==
Initially, the Bundeswehr did not investigate the results of the air strike, and for months acted as if there had been no civilian casualties. A German lawyer of Afghan descent, Karim Popal, identified 179 civilian victims, threatening legal action. A Bundeswehr investigation then identified 102 families of civilian victims. In June 2010 Germany announced it will pay $5,000 to each of almost all of the identified families, as an ex gratia payment without admitting liability.

The earlier official Afghan report about the incident lists 119 dead. This includes 49 armed militants, 20 unarmed militants, 30 civilians and 20 unidentified.

The first independent estimate of the death toll, on September 7, 2009, the Afghanistan Rights Monitor (ARM), a prominent Afghan human rights group, said that up to 70 civilians had been killed in the German requested U.S. airstrike. The non-governmental group reached the figure based on interviews with local residents that indicated that 60 to 70 non-combatants had died in the airstrike, as well as more than a dozen armed men.

The Taliban said they had also set up a commission to investigate the incident, and released a list of 79 civilians – showing name, father's name, and age – that they claimed had been killed in the airstrike. The list included 24 children under the age of 18.

== See also ==
- Kunduz hospital airstrike
- Azizabad airstrike
- Haska Meyna wedding party airstrike
- Granai airstrike
- Sangin airstrike
- Uruzgan helicopter attack
- Civilian casualties of the War in Afghanistan (2001–present)
- List of massacres in Afghanistan
