= List of civilian casualties in the war in Afghanistan (2012) =

List of civilian casualties in the War in Afghanistan (2012)

- February 8, 2012 – 2012 Kapisa airstrike – Seven children and a young adult were killed by an ISAF airstrike in the village of Geyaba in the eastern Afghan province of Kapisa.
- February 17, 2012 – Kunar Raid – Six civilians were killed in a night raid in Dewa Gul Valley, in the Chawki district of Kunar province.
- March 11, 2012 – Kandahar massacre – At least 16 civilians were killed after a 'rogue' US serviceman entered their homes and began to open fire in the Afghan province of Kandahar.
- May 2012 – An Australian soldier shot and killed a civilian named Dad Mohammad in Uruzgan Province.
- May 27, 2012 – Eight members of an Afghan family were killed in a NATO airstrike in eastern Afghanistan.
- July 2, 2012 – NATO killed three shopkeepers in an airstrike near Charkh District, east of Afghanistan. Logar province spokesman Din Mohammad Darwesh said NATO forces were on a foot patrol in morning of July 2 in Charkh district when they came under fire from insurgents. He said they called in an airstrike and the bombardment killed three shopkeepers.
- September, 2012 – NATO killed eight women and injured a further seven women, in an airstrike in Laghman.

== See also ==
- Civilian casualties in the War in Afghanistan (2001–present)
