= 2012 Kapisa airstrike =

NATO airstrike in Afghanistan

Date	8 February 2012
Location	Giawa village, Nijrab District, Kapisa Province, Afghanistan
Result	7 children between the age of 6-12 and one mentally handicapped 18-year-old

The 2012 Kapisa airstrike refers to a NATO air raid in which seven children and one adult were killed in a village in Nijrab District of Kapisa Province, Afghanistan. The strike took place on 8 February 2012.

== Events ==
Kapisa district police chief Abdul Hamid Erkin told AFP: "Two nights ago foreign special forces carried out a raid on a house in Geyawa village in Nejrab district. ... The next morning their plane carried out an airstrike on a house in the village as a result of which seven children and one adult were martyred." He also said commanders of French troops "claimed that the target was a group of Taliban facilitators, but we checked the area and there were no Taliban. ...In fact the people in the area have very strong anti-Taliban feelings."

According to Hussain Khan Sanjani, the leader of the Kapisa provincial council: "the victims rounded up sheep and cows and moved them toward a mountainous area behind their homes," he said. "When they got cold, they gathered brush and lighted a fire to keep warm... One airstrike hit a large boulder and the other struck the victims, who were badly burned."

== Investigation ==
President Hamid Karzai had assigned a delegation "to launch an all-out probe into the NATO bombing in the province of Kapisa", a statement from his office said. He then sent an advisor, Mohammad Zahir Safi, to the area to investigate the incident.

== Reactions ==
President Hamid Karzai "strongly condemned an airstrike by foreign troops which resulted in the killing of a number of children,".

== See also ==
- Granai airstrike
- Deh Bala wedding party bombing
- Civilian casualties of the War in Afghanistan (2001–present)
