= Grishk District =

Grishk Nahri Saraj
- District
- Location within Afghanistan
- Coordinates: 31°49′N 64°33′E
- Country: Afghanistan
- Province: Helmand Province
- Occupation: Taliban

Population (2012)
  - Total: 114,200

Grishk District (Pashto: ګرشک ولسوالۍ) (population 114,200), also called Nahri Saraj District (نهر سراج ولسوالۍ), is a district in Helmand Province in southern Afghanistan. Its principal municipality is Grishk (population 48,546). Grishk Dam is located in the district.

== History ==
On 3 May 2020, seven Afghan security forces were killed and at least 12 others wounded in a suicide truck bomb attack on a military and intelligence base in Grishk District. A Mazda mini truck was exploded in front of the gate by the suicide attacker, partially damaging the base. The Taliban claimed responsibility for the attack.

On 17 March 2024, at least 21 people were killed and 38 others were injured in a traffic accident in the district.

== Demography ==
The ethnic composition is predominantly Pashtun, and the main tribe is Noorzai.

== Location ==
Gerishk District sits at the intersection of Highway 1 (the 'Afghan ring-road', based on the old Silk Road and refurbished in the 1960s with US investment) and the Helmand River. A major stopping-point on the trade routes from Pakistan and Iran, Grishk enjoys the prospect of returning to its historical prosperity, although this is under threat of Taliban resurgence in the region. Route 611 passes through Gerishk District.

== Income ==
The main source of income is agriculture. The soil is rich and the irrigation systems are in relatively good condition. The irrigation is from the Helamand River, karezes and tube-wells.

== Hospitals and Schools ==
There is a hospital with both male and female doctors. There are 20 schools in the district, attended by 80% of the children.

== Operation Enduring Freedom ==
Bismullah appointed to be the transportation director for Ghereskh by the Hamid Karzai administration was sent to Guantanamo Bay detention camp, where he was held in extrajudicial detention for seven years. On January 17, 2009, the US Government acknowledged that he had never been an "enemy combatant".

== See also ==
- Hyderabad airstrike
