= Azizabad, Herat =

Village in Herat Province, Afghanistan

Coordinates: 33.363083°N 62.341347°E

Azizabad is a village in the Shindand district, Herat Province, Afghanistan.

It has become known to the wider world due to an attack that took place on Friday 22 August 2008, in which an American attack plane fired indiscriminately on civilians, killing 60 children and 30 adults, as well as destroying many homes.

== See also ==
- Azizabad airstrike
- Herat Province
