= Granai =

Granai (Pashto: گرانای Grānāy) is a village located in Bala Buluk District, Farah Province, Afghanistan. In 2009 it was the location of a controversial US airstrike which killed dozens of civilians.

== See also ==
- Granai airstrike
