= 2017 Sangin airstrike =

Bombing of the Sangin District by the United States

- Part of the War in Afghanistan (2001–2021)
- Type: Airstrike
- Location: Sangin, Afghanistan; 32°04′24″N 64°50′16″E
- Target: Taliban (U.S. claim)
- Date: 10 February 2017
- Executed by: United States Air Force
- Casualties: 18-45 civilians killed Unknown injured
- Location of Sangin within Afghanistan

The 2017 Sangin airstrike was an American bombing of the Sangin District in the Helmand Province in Afghanistan. The United Nations mission in Afghanistan stated that "initial inquiries suggest that the airstrikes killed at least 18 civilians, nearly all women and children." A spokesman for the Afghan defense ministry, Dawlat Waziri, denied the reports of civilian casualties but witnesses in the area corroborated the UN report that there were no Taliban members in the area and that U.S. troops had visited the neighborhood days before the incident. The governor of the Helmand Province also corroborated that civilians were killed following the province's own independent analysis of the incident. Elders from Sangin put the number of civilian fatalities higher at 22 killed. Brigadier General Charles H. Cleveland, a spokesman for the international coalition, confirmed that the U.S. had conducted approximately 30 airstrikes in Sangin the prior week. The airstrike was also referred to as the Second Sangin airstrike, seeing as the U.S. had previously conducted an airstrike in Sangin in July 2010 that killed numerous civilians.
