= Burhanullah Shinwari =

Afghan politician

Burhanullah Shinwari was the deputy chairman of the upper house of Afghanistan's legislature.

In July 2008 he led a delegation of legislators to investigate the Deh Bala wedding party bombing, an incident where American helicopter fired on a wedding party, killing 47, mostly women and children.
