= Night raid on Narang =

2009 NATO-authorized raid in Afghanistan

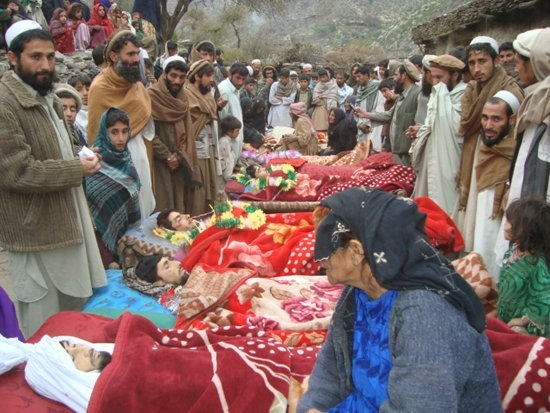
- People of Narang district mourning for the students killed in the raid
Date	December 27, 2009
Location	Ghazi Khan Ghondi village, Narang District, Kunar Province, Afghanistan
Result	Death of 10 local civilians

The night raid on Narang was a night raid on a household in the village of Ghazi Khan in the early morning hours of December 27, 2009. The operation was authorized by NATO and resulted in the death of ten Afghan civilians, most of whom were students, and some of whom were children. The status of the deceased was initially in dispute with NATO officials claiming the dead were Taliban members found with weapons and bomb making materials, while some Afghan government officials and local tribal authorities asserted they were civilians.

According to an Afghan initial investigation led by Assadullah Wafa, the raiding party took off by helicopter from Kabul. The raiding party allegedly dragged the victims out of their beds and shot them in the head or chest. A survivor was subsequently interrogated and pictures were taken of the dead bodies. Investigations later determined that most of the victims were aged between 12 and 18 years and were enrolled in local schools.

The Afghan government claimed US forces were involved, while statements by NATO asserted US and NATO forces did not participate in the shootings. Afghan Defense Ministry spokesman Zaher Azimy said Afghan troops had not taken part in the operation. Who exactly carried out the raid and shot the victims remains unclear. In 2015 it became known that as part of the US covert Omega Program SEAL Team Six members in conjunction with CIA paramilitary officers and Afghan troops trained by the CIA carried out the assault.

== Summary of events ==
According to an Afghan investigation at around 1 am American troops with helicopters left Kabul and landed around 2 km away. They walked from the helicopters to the houses where they gathered the students from two rooms, into one room, and opened fire. Colonel Gross said that U.S. forces were present but did not lead the operation. A local elder, Jan Mohammed, said that three boys were killed in one room and five were handcuffed before they were shot. "I saw their school books covered in blood," he said.

== Investigation ==
President Hamid Karzai strongly condemned the military operation and tasked a delegation led by Assadullah Wafa to investigate the killings. The investigation found that all of the victims were civilians and that eight of them were students between the ages of 12 and 17. A preliminary investigation by the United Nations reinforced Afghan claims that most of the dead were schoolboys. Assadullah Wafa who led the investigation, said: "It’s impossible they were al-Qaeda. They were children, they were civilians, they were innocent." While a joint Afghan-NATO investigation is ongoing Hamid Karzai offered 100,000 afghanis to the victim's families. Amid calls for prosecution of the attackers by the Afghan Security Council Karzai conceded that he didn't know who the shooters were. Afghan Defense Ministry spokesman Zaher Azimy said Afghan troops had not taken part in the operation. NATO reiterated that the forces which conducted the attack were not under NATO command and were of a "non-military" nature. NATO did, though, concede it authorized the operation and apologized for doing so, admitting the dead were likely civilians "gunned down by mistake".

== Reactions ==
=== Afghanistan ===
Hundreds of Afghans rallied in the streets of Jalalabad and Kabul. Hundreds were university students and some were wearing blue headbands with the words: "Stop killing us!". They burned an effigy of U.S. President Barack Obama and chanted "Death to America" and "Obama! Obama! Take your soldiers out of Afghanistan!".

Safiullah Aminzai, a student organiser, told AFP: "Our demonstration is against those foreigners who have come to our country." "They have not brought democracy to Afghanistan but they are killing our religious scholars and children."

=== Relatives of the victims ===
Farooq Abul Ajan who lost two children, four nephews and two brothers in the operation complained to President Hamid Karzai that no one has taken responsibility. He said "We wanted to know who it was." The president’s spokesman, Waheed Omar, assured the relatives that the palace were “actively seeking” to bring the perpetrators to justice.

== See also ==
- Khataba raid
- Granai airstrike
- Azizabad airstrike
- Uruzgan helicopter attack
- Haska Meyna wedding party airstrike
- List of massacres in Afghanistan
