= Shaghzay ambush =

2009 battle between Afghan police and Taliban militants

- Part of War in Afghanistan
Date	1 January 2009
Location	Shaghzay, Helmand province Afghanistan
Result	Taliban victory

Belligerents
Islamic Republic of Afghanistan: Afghan National Police	(Afghanistan) Taliban

Strength
40	Unknown

Casualties and losses
20–32 killed	2 killed

The Shaghzay ambush was a battle fought between police forces and Taliban militants in Afghanistan on 1 January 2009.

== Main battle ==
On 1 January 2009, the Shaghzay ambush unfolded in the village of Shaghzay, located in the Kajaki district of Helmand province, Afghanistan. A contingent of approximately 40 Afghan National Police (ANP) officers, serving as bodyguards for the district chief of nearby Musa Qala, were taking a midday meal when they were suddenly attacked by Taliban militants. The assault was meticulously planned, with insurgents infiltrating the village to launch a coordinated offensive.

According to survivors, the ambush commenced with a barrage of gunfire from the Taliban, leading to immediate casualties among the police. In the ensuing chaos, some officers reportedly turned their weapons on fellow policemen, defecting to the Taliban side. The remaining officers were overwhelmed; many were killed by gunfire, and reports indicate that some were subsequently beheaded and their bodies mutilated. Eight policemen managed to escape to a nearby town.

The Taliban claimed responsibility for the attack, stating it was facilitated by insider information from a defected police officer who provided details about the police group's movements. This insider reportedly joined the Taliban following the ambush.

=== Aftermath ===
In the aftermath, police reinforcements arrived approximately an hour later, by which time the Taliban had withdrawn from Shaghzay, taking with them several defected officers. The reinforcements successfully reestablished control over the village.

Casualty reports vary: Afghan officials confirmed 20 police fatalities, while Taliban sources claimed up to 32 police were killed. Additionally, the Taliban reported two of their fighters were killed and four wounded during the ambush.
