= Neue Juristische Wochenschrift =

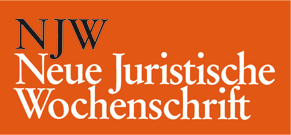
- Editor: Wolfgang Ewer, Rainer Hamm, Ulrich Karpenstein, Georg Maier-Reimer, Ingeborg Rakete-Dombek, Michael Streck
- Categories: Legal magazine
- Frequency: Weekly
- Circulation: 42.000
- Publisher: C.H. Beck
- Founded: 1946
- Country: Germany
- Based in: Frankfurt am Main
- Language: German
- Website: www.njw.de
- ISSN: 0341-1915

The Neue Juristische Wochenschrift (NJW) (German: New Legal Weekly Journal) is a German legal magazine. It is published weekly by C. H. Beck in a run of 42.836 copies. It was founded in 1946 and counts as one of the two most important German legal magazines.
