= 2010 Sangin airstrike =

Civilians killing during NATO attack

Sangin airstrike
Date	July 23, 2010
Location	Sangin, Helmand province, Afghanistan
Result	Estimated 39-52 people killed, mostly women and children

On July 23, 2010, a NATO attack killed and injured many Afghan civilians, most of whom were women and children, in the village of Sangin in Helmand province, Afghanistan.

The Afghan government claimed that a helicopter-gunship rocket strike killed 52 civilians. Many other civilians including children were also injured and treated at Kandahar hospital. For weeks, US military and North Atlantic Treaty Organization (NATO) officials denied that there had been any such incident.

About 200-400 people took to the streets in Kabul, protesting the killing of civilians by foreign troops, carrying photos of those who died in the airstrike.

The Karzai government sent investigators to the site, who concluded that 39 civilians were killed in the rocket strike.

According to a statement by the Presidential Palace, the investigation confirmed that 39 civilians had been killed by NATO-led troops in Sangin. The figure was lower than the initially reported 45–52. According to the investigation, all 39 dead were women or children.

== See also ==
- Azizabad airstrike
- Haska Meyna wedding party airstrike
- Granai airstrike
- 2009 Kunduz airstrike
- Uruzgan helicopter attack
