= 2010 Uruzgan helicopter attack =

Attack on Afghan civilians by American army

- Location: Uruzgan, Afghanistan
- Date: 21 February 2010
- Target: Afghan civilians
- Deaths: 27–33 civilians
- Perpetrator: United States Armed Forces

Uruzgan helicopter attack refers to the 21 February 2010 killing of Afghan civilians, including over 20 men, four women and one child, by the United States Armed Forces, with another 12 civilians wounded. The attack took place near the border between Uruzgan and Daikundi province in Afghanistan when special operation troops helicopters attacked three minibuses with "airborne weapons".

== Summary of events ==
The victims were traveling in three buses in broad daylight in a group of 42 civilians in Uruzgan province near the border to Daikundi on 21 February 2010. When the convoy was on a main road in the village of Zerma it came under attack from U.S. Special Forces piloting Little Bird helicopters using "airborne weapons". NATO later stated that they believed at that time that the minibuses were carrying insurgents. 27 civilians including four women and one child were killed in the attack while another 12 were wounded. Initially the number of deaths was reported at 33. ISAF ground troops transported the wounded to medical treatment facilities after they found women and children at the scene.

== Reaction ==
=== Afghanistan ===
Afghanistan's cabinet called the killings "unjustifiable" and condemned the raid "in the strongest terms possible". The local governor and the Interior Minister said that all of the victims were civilians. Amanullah Hotak, head of Uruzgan's provincial council said: "We don't want their apologies or the money they always give after every attack. We want them to kill all of us together instead of doing it to us one by one." Haji Ghullam Rasoul, whose cousins died in the attack, said, "They came here to bring security but they kill our children, they kill our brothers and they kill our people."

=== United States ===
U.S. General Stanley McChrystal said he was "extremely saddened". "I have made it clear to our forces that we are here to protect the Afghan people, and inadvertently killing or injuring civilians undermines their trust and confidence in our mission," he said in a statement. "We will re-double our efforts to regain that trust."

=== Netherlands ===
A Dutch Defence Ministry spokesman in The Hague said Dutch forces did not call the airstrike, which took place in an area under Dutch military control.

== See also ==
- Azizabad airstrike
- Haska Meyna wedding party airstrike
- Granai airstrike
- 2009 Kunduz airstrike
- Sangin airstrike
