= Civilian casualties in the war in Afghanistan (2001–2021) =

The War in Afghanistan killed 176,000 people in Afghanistan: 46,319 civilians, 69,095 military and police and at least 52,893 opposition fighters, according to the Costs of War Project. However, the death toll is possibly higher due to unaccounted deaths by "disease, loss of access to food, water, infrastructure, and/or other indirect consequences of the war." According to the Uppsala Conflict Data Program, the conflict killed 212,191 people. The Cost of War project estimated in 2015 that the number who have died through indirect causes related to the war may be as high as 360,000 additional people based on a ratio of indirect to direct deaths in contemporary conflicts.

The war, launched by the United States as "Operation Enduring Freedom" in 2001, began with an initial air campaign that almost immediately prompted concerns over the number of Afghan civilians being killed. According to The United Nations Assistance Mission in Afghanistan (UNAMA), the majority of civilian casualties were attributed to the Taliban and other anti-government elements each year, with the figure ranging from 61% to 80% depending on the year. Civilian deaths were higher in the latter part of the war, with 2015 and 2016 both consecutively breaking the record of annual civilian deaths. The civilian losses are a continuation of the high civilian casualties experienced during the Soviet–Afghan War in the 1980s, and the three periods of civil war following it: 1989–1992, 1992–1996, and 1996–2001.

== Estimates ==
There is no single official figure for the overall number of civilians killed by the war since 2001, but estimates for specific years or periods have been published by a number of independent organizations and are presented here.

Most, if not all, of the sources state that their estimates are likely to be underestimates.

=== Aggregation of estimates ===
Year
Civilians killed as a result of insurgent actions
Civilians killed as a result of U.S.-led military actions
Civilians killed as a result of the war
2001
n/a
- The Project on Defense Alternatives estimated that in a 3-month period between October 7, 2001, and January 1, 2002, at least 1,000-1,300 civilians were directly killed by the U.S.-led aerial bombing campaign, and that by mid-January 2002, at least 3,200 more Afghans had died of "starvation, exposure, associated illnesses, or injury sustained while in flight from war zones", as a result of war.
- The Los Angeles Times found that in a 5-month period from October 7, 2001, to February 28, 2002, there were between 1,067 and 1,201 civilian deaths from the bombing campaign reported in U.S., British, and Pakistani newspapers and international wire services.
- According to The Guardian, possibly as many as 20,000 Afghans died in 2001 as an indirect result of the initial U.S. airstrikes and ground invasion.
- Professor Marc W. Herold of the University of New Hampshire estimated that in the 20-month period between October 7, 2001, and June 3, 2003, at least 3,100 to 3,600 civilians were directly killed by U.S.-led forces.

2002
n/a
2003
n/a
2004
n/a
n/a
n/a
2005
n/a
- Professor Marc W. Herold of the University of New Hampshire estimated at least 408-478 Afghan civilians were directly killed by U.S./NATO actions.
- direct civilian deaths: at least 408 to 478
2006
- Human Rights Watch estimated at least 699 Afghan civilians were killed by various insurgent forces in 2006.
- Human Rights Watch estimated at least 230 Afghan civilians were killed by US or NATO attacks in 2006: 116 by airstrikes and 114 by ground fire.
- Professor Marc W. Herold of the University of New Hampshire estimated at least 653–769 Afghan civilians were directly killed by U.S./NATO actions.
- Human Rights Watch estimated at least 929 Afghan civilians were killed in fighting related to the armed conflict in 2006. In all, they estimated more than 4,400 Afghans (civilians and militants) were killed in conflict-related violence in 2006, twice as many as in 2005.
- An Associated Press tally based on reports from NATO, coalition, and Afghan officials, estimated 4,000 Afghans (civilians and militants) were killed in 2006.
2007
- The UN Assistance Mission Afghanistan (UNAMA) estimated that 700 Afghan civilians were killed by anti-government elements in 2007, accounting for 46% of the civilian casualties.
- Human Rights Watch estimated that at least 950 Afghan civilians were killed by various insurgent forces in 2007.
- Human Rights Watch estimated at least 434 Afghan civilians were killed by US or NATO attacks in 2007: 321 by airstrikes and 113 by ground fire. Another 57 civilians were killed in crossfire, and 192 died under unclear circumstances.
- The UN Assistance Mission Afghanistan (UNAMA) estimated that 629 Afghan civilians were killed by international and Afghan forces in 2007, accounting for 41% of the civilian casualties.
- Professor Marc W. Herold of the University of New Hampshire estimated at least 1,010-1,297 Afghan civilians were directly killed by U.S./NATO actions.
- The UN Assistance Mission Afghanistan (UNAMA) estimated that 1,523 Afghan civilians died as a direct result of armed conflict in 2007.
- Human Rights Watch estimated at least 1,633 Afghan civilians were killed in fighting related to the armed conflict in 2007.
2008
- The Afghan Independent Human Rights Commission (AIHRC) estimated that around 1,000 civilians were killed by militant groups in 2008.
- The UN Assistance Mission in Afghanistan (UNAMA) reported that 1,160 Afghan civilians were killed by anti-government forces in 2008, accounting for 55% of the civilian deaths.
- The Afghanistan Rights Monitor estimated that over 2,300 civilians were killed by insurgents in 2008, including 930 in suicide bombings.
- The Afghan Independent Human Rights Commission (AIHRC) estimated that around 800 civilians were killed by U.S.-led military forces in 2008.
- The UN Assistance Mission in Afghanistan (UNAMA) reported that 828 Afghan civilians had been killed by international-led military forces in 2008, accounting for 39% of the civilian deaths. Air-strikes accounted for the largest proportion of this number, 64%, with 552 civilians killed as a result of U.S./NATO airstrikes.
- According to Afghanistan's ambassador to Australia, Amanullah Jayhoon, 1,000 Afghan civilians were killed by coalition forces in 2008.
- The Afghanistan Rights Monitor estimated that over 1,620 civilians were killed by U.S.-led military forces in 2008, including 680 killed in airstrikes. ARM also estimated that military operations by US-led NATO and coalition forces caused at least 2,800 injuries and displaced 80,000 people from their homes.
- Professor Marc W. Herold of the University of New Hampshire estimated at least 864–1,017 Afghan civilians were directly killed by U.S./NATO foreign forces in 2008.
- The Afghan Independent Human Rights Commission (AIHRC) estimated that around 1,800 civilians were killed as a result of the armed hostilities in 2008.
- The UN Assistance Mission in Afghanistan (UNAMA) reported that 2,118 Afghan civilians were killed as a direct result of armed conflict in 2008, the highest number since the end of the initial 2001 invasion.
- The Afghanistan Rights Monitor (ARM) estimated that in 2008 around 3,917 civilians were killed, over 6,800 were wounded, and around 120,000 were forced out of their homes.
2009
- The UN Assistance Mission in Afghanistan (UNAMA) attributed 1,630 Afghan civilian deaths as having been caused by anti-government elements in 2009, representing two-thirds of the 2,412 Afghan civilian deaths it recorded in the American-led war in 2009.
- The UN Assistance Mission in Afghanistan (UNAMA) attributed 596 Afghan civilian deaths as having been caused by international-led military forces in 2009, representing about a quarter of the 2,412 Afghan civilian deaths it recorded as having been caused by the war in 2009.
- The UN Assistance Mission in Afghanistan (UNAMA) recorded 2,412 Afghan civilian deaths in the American-led war in 2009, representing a jump of 14% over the number killed in 2008. In 186 (8%) of the deaths, UNAMA was unable to clearly attribute the cause to any one side.
2010
- The UN Assistance Mission in Afghanistan (UNAMA) and the Afghanistan Independent Human Rights Commission (AIHRC) attributed 2,080 Afghan civilian deaths as having been caused by anti-government elements in 2010, up 28% from 2009 and representing 74.9% of the 2,777 Afghan civilian deaths they recorded in the American-led war in 2010.
- The UN Assistance Mission in Afghanistan (UNAMA) and the Afghanistan Independent Human Rights Commission (AIHRC) attributed 440 Afghan civilian deaths as having been caused by U.S.-led military forces in 2010, down 26% from 2009 and representing 15.9% of the 2,777 Afghan civilian deaths they recorded in the American-led war in 2010.
- The UN Assistance Mission in Afghanistan (UNAMA) and the Afghanistan Independent Human Rights Commission (AIHRC) recorded 2,777 Afghan civilian deaths in the American-led war in 2010, a jump of 15% over the number killed in 2009. In 9% of the deaths, UNAMA and AIHRC were unable to clearly attribute the cause to any one side.
2011
- The UN Assistance Mission in Afghanistan (UNAMA) and the Afghanistan Independent Human Rights Commission (AIHRC) attributed 1,167 Afghan civilian deaths as having been caused by anti-government elements in the first six months of 2011, up 28% from the same period in 2010 and representing 79.8% of the total 1,462 Afghan civilian deaths they recorded in the conflict during this period.
- The UN Assistance Mission in Afghanistan (UNAMA) and the Afghanistan Independent Human Rights Commission (AIHRC) attributed 207 Afghan civilian deaths as having been caused by U.S.-led military forces in the first six months of 2011, down 9% from the same period in 2010 and representing 14.2% of the 1,462 Afghan civilian deaths they recorded in the conflict during this period.
- The UN Assistance Mission in Afghanistan (UNAMA) and the Afghanistan Independent Human Rights Commission (AIHRC) recorded 1,462 Afghan civilian deaths in the American-led war in the first six months of 2011, a jump of 15% over the number killed in the same period in 2010. In 6% of the deaths, UNAMA and AIHRC were unable to clearly attribute the cause to any one side.

- *Note: In UNAMA/AIHRC methodology, whenever it remains uncertain whether a victim is a civilian after they have assessed the facts available to them, UNAMA/AIHRC does not count that victim as a possible civilian casualty. The number of such victims is not provided.

=== Civilian casualties (2001–2003) ===
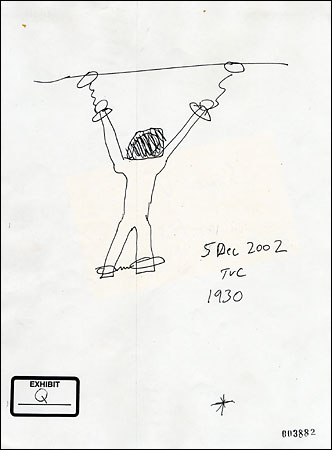
Sketch showing the Afghan Taxi driver Dilawar who was tortured and killed while In U.S. custody in 2002.

According to Marc W. Herold's extensive database, Dossier on Civilian Victims of United States' Aerial Bombing, between 3,100 and 3,600 civilians were directly killed by U.S. Operation Enduring Freedom bombing and U.S. Special Forces attacks between October 7, 2001, and June 3, 2003. This estimate counts only "impact deaths" – deaths that occurred in the immediate aftermath of an explosion or shooting – and does not count deaths that occurred later as a result of injuries sustained, or deaths that occurred as an indirect consequence of the U.S. airstrikes and invasion.

In an opinion article published in August 2002 in the neoconservative magazine The Weekly Standard, Joshua Muravchik of the American Enterprise Institute, a self-described neoconservative, questioned Professor Herold's study entirely on the basis of one single incident that involved 25-93 deaths. He did not provide any estimate his own.

In a pair of January 2002 studies, Carl Conetta of the Project on Defense Alternatives estimates that, at least 4,200-4,500 civilians were killed by mid-January 2002 as a result of the U.S. war and airstrikes, both directly as casualties of the aerial bombing campaign, and indirectly in the humanitarian crisis that the war and airstrikes contributed to.

His first study, "Operation Enduring Freedom: Why a Higher Rate of Civilian Bombing Casualties?", released January 18, 2002, estimates that, at the low end, at least 1,000-1,300 civilians were directly killed in the aerial bombing campaign in just the 3 months between October 7, 2001, to January 1, 2002. The author found it impossible to provide an upper-end estimate to direct civilian casualties from the Operation Enduring Freedom bombing campaign that he noted as having an increased use of cluster bombs. In this lower-end estimate, only Western press sources were used for hard numbers, while heavy "reduction factors" were applied to Afghan government reports so that their estimates were reduced by as much as 75%.

In his companion study, "Strange Victory: A critical appraisal of Operation Enduring Freedom and the Afghanistan war", released January 30, 2002, Conetta estimates that at least 3,200 more Afghans died by mid-January 2002, of "starvation, exposure, associated illnesses, or injury sustained while in flight from war zones", as a result of the U.S. war and airstrikes.

In similar numbers, a Los Angeles Times review of U.S., British, and Pakistani newspapers and international wire services found that between 1,067 and 1,201 direct civilian deaths were reported by those news organizations during the five months from October 7, 2001, to February 28, 2002. This review excluded all civilian deaths in Afghanistan that did not get reported by U.S., British, or Pakistani news, excluded 497 deaths that did get reported in U.S., British, and Pakistani news but that were not specifically identified as civilian or military, and excluded 754 civilian deaths that were reported by the Taliban but not independently confirmed.

According to Jonathan Steele of The Guardian, up to 20,000 Afghans may have died as a consequence of the first four months of U.S. airstrikes on Afghanistan.

=== Civilian and overall casualties (2005) ===
An estimated 1,700 people were killed in 2005 according to an Associated Press count, including civilians, insurgents and security forces members. Some 600 policemen were killed between Hamid Karzai's election as president of Afghanistan in early December 2004 and mid-May 2005.

=== Civilian and overall casualties (2006) ===
A report by Human Rights Watch said that 4,400 Afghans had been killed in 2006, more than 1,000 of them civilians. Some 2,077 militants were killed in Coalition operations between September 1 and December 13.

An Associated Press tally based on reports from Afghan, NATO and coalition officials puts the overall death toll slightly lower, at about 4,000, most of them militants.

More than 1,900 people were killed in the first eight months of the year by the end of August.

=== Civilian and overall casualties (2007) ===
More than 7,700 people were killed in 2007, including: 1,019 Afghan policemen; 4,478 militants; 1,980 civilians and 232 foreign soldiers.

With by far the most comprehensive research into Afghan civilian casualties, Professor Marc W. Herold of the University of New Hampshire estimated in September 2007 that between 5,700 and 6,500 Afghan civilians had been killed so far in the war by US and NATO military forces. He stressed that this was an "absolute minimum" and probably "a vast underestimate" because the figures do not include:

- the dead among the tens of thousands of Afghans displaced during the initial military operation in 2001–2002, who ended up in refugee camps or elsewhere with little or no supplies for long periods;
- civilian victims of U.S./NATO bombing in mountainous areas, which have few or no communications links or which the U.S./NATO forces "cordon off as part of news management";
- and civilians that did not die immediately at the scene but died later of their injuries.

=== Civilian and overall casualties (2008) ===
The UN Assistance Mission in Afghanistan (UNAMA) reported that 2,118 civilians were killed as a result of armed conflict in Afghanistan in 2008, the highest civilian death toll since the end of the initial 2001 invasion. This represents an increase of about 40 percent over UNAMA's figure of 1,523 civilians killed in 2007.

On the other hand, according to NATO forces only about 1,000 civilians were killed during the whole year.

Going into further detail, UNAMA reported that out of 2,118 civilian deaths in 2008, 1,160 non-combatants were killed by anti-government forces, accounting for 55% of the 2008 total, while 828 were killed by international-led military forces, accounting for 39% of the 2008 total. The remaining 6% – 130 deaths – could not be attributed to any of the parties since some of them died as a result of crossfire or were killed by unexploded ordnance, for example. Of the civilians killed by anti-government elements, 85% died as a result of suicide or improvised explosive devices. Of the civilians killed by pro-government forces, 64% were killed by U.S./NATO airstrikes. (Note: UNAMA's report includes in its count of civilian/non-combatant deaths any "members of the military who are not being utilized in counter insurgency operations, including when they are off-duty".)

The Afghan Independent Human Rights Commission (AIHRC) estimated the number of civilians killed as a result of the armed hostilities in 2008 at around 1,800, with about 1,000 killed by militant groups and about 800 killed by U.S.-led military forces.

The Afghanistan Rights Monitor, a Kabul-based rights watchdog, estimated that in 2008 about 3,917 civilians were killed, over 6,800 were wounded, and around 120,000 were forced out of their homes. ARM estimated that insurgents killed over 2,300 civilians, including 930 in suicide bombings, and that U.S.-led military forces killed over 1,620 civilians, with 1,100 civilians killed by U.S.-led NATO and coalition forces and 520 civilians killed by Afghan military forces. Out of these, 680 Afghan civilians killed in air strikes by the US-led forces, with U.S. combat aircraft conducting at least 15,000 close air support missions over the year. Another 2,800 civilians were injured and 80,000 displaced from their homes by the U.S.-led NATO and coalition military operations.

According to Afghanistan's ambassador to Australia, Amanullah Jayhoon, 1,000 Afghan civilians were killed by coalition forces in 2008.

Meanwhile, NATO's International Security Assistance Force has said that only just over 200 civilians were mistakenly killed by foreign troops last year.

According to NATO spokesman James Appathurai, 97 civilian deaths were caused by ISAF in 2008, while 987 civilian deaths were caused by militant groups. The number of civilian deaths caused by US-led military forces operating outside of ISAF was not mentioned in that statement.

In October 2008, Professor Marc W. Herold of the University of New Hampshire reported that the number of civilians killed in direct action by U.S. and other NATO forces from 2005 up that point in 2008 was at least between 2,699 and 3,273. These figures represent underestimates of the number of Afghan civilians killed because civilians are sometimes labelled militants by the military and because these figures only include civilians that died immediately at the scene and not civilians that died later of their injuries.

In 2008, 38 aid workers, almost all from NGO's, were killed, double the number from 2007, and 147 were abducted.

According to the Afghanistan Rights Monitor (ARM) more than 1,100 Afghan police and 530 Afghan soldiers lost their lives in 2008.

According to NATO forces, 5,000 militants were killed in 2008.

=== Civilian and overall casualties (2009) ===
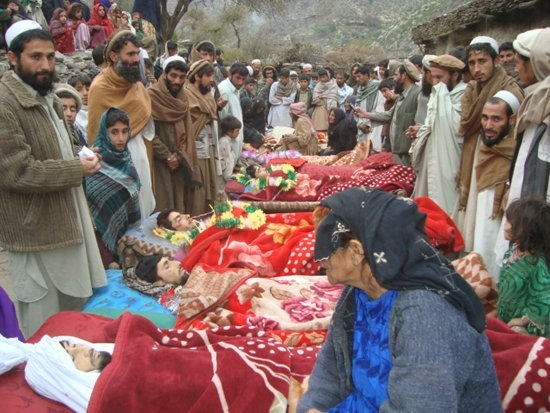
Victims of the Narang night raid that killed at least 10 Afghan civilians, including eight schoolchildren.

2009 was again the most lethal year for Afghan civilians in the American-led war since the fall of the Taliban government in late 2001. According to the UN Assistance Mission in Afghanistan (UNAMA), 2,412 civilians were killed by the war in 2009, a jump of 14% over the number that lost their lives in 2008. An additional 3,566 Afghan civilians were wounded as a result of the war in 2009. Of these, UNAMA attributed two-thirds, or 1,630, of the deaths to the action of anti-government forces, around a quarter, 596, of the deaths to action by American-led military forces, and was not able to clearly attribute another 186 civilian deaths to any one side. Airstrikes continued to be the main cause of civilian deaths resulting from US-led military action, with 359 Afghan civilians killed by US/NATO airstrikes in 2009. In its mid-year report, the UNAMA underlined that "if the non-combatant status of one or more victim(s) remains under significant doubt, such deaths are not included in the overall number of civilian casualties. Thus, there is a significant possibility that UNAMA is under-reporting civilian casualties."

On 11 May 2009, U.S. Secretary of Defense Robert Gates replaced McKiernan with General McChrystal as the new U.S. commander of all foreign military forces in Afghanistan. One of General McChrystal's first announcements was a sharp restriction on the use of airstrikes to reduce civilian casualties. Afghan leaders have long pleaded that foreign troops end airstrikes and nighttime raids of Afghan homes. Consequently, effective 2 July 2009, coalition air and ground combat operations were ordered to take steps to minimize Afghan civilian casualties in accordance with a tactical directive issued by General Stanley A. McChrystal, USA, the commander of the International Security Assistance Force in Afghanistan. In addition to a growing number of Afghan civilians being killed, Afghan populations caught in the eight-year war have also suffered from loss of livelihood, displacement, and the destruction of their homes, property, and personal assets. The issue of civilian casualties is recognized as a problem at the highest levels of ISAF command. In a September 2009 report, General McChrystal wrote "Civilian casualties and collateral damage to homes and property resulting from an over-reliance on firepower and force protection have severely damaged ISAF's legitimacy in the eyes of the Afghan people."

In September 2009, the U.N. reported that August had been the deadliest month of 2009 to date for Afghan civilians as a result of the August 20th election. The U.N. also reported that about 1,500 people were killed from the start of the year through August. The report stated: "August (was) the deadliest month since the beginning of 2009. ... These figures reflect an increasing trend in insecurity over recent months and in elections-related violence." UN Assistance Mission in Afghanistan (UNAMA) attributed 68% of the deaths to anti-government elements and 23% of the deaths to international-led military forces – most of them in airstrikes. In 9% of the civilian deaths, UNAMA was unable to clearly attribute the cause to any one side of the parties in the conflict. The number of civilians killed represented an increase of 31% over the same period in 2008, when 1,145 civilians were killed.

=== Civilian and overall casualties (2010) ===
2010 was again the deadliest year for Afghan civilians in the war since the fall of the Taliban government in late 2001, as insecurity and volatility continued to spread to the northern, eastern, and western regions of Afghanistan.

According to the UN Assistance Mission in Afghanistan (UNAMA) and the Afghanistan Independent Human Rights Commission (AIHRC), 2,777 Afghan civilians were killed in the war in 2010, a jump of 15% over the civilian toll in 2009. Of these, UNAMA/AIHRC attributed 2,080 civilian deaths to insurgents and anti-government elements, representing 74.9% of the 2,777 Afghan civilian deaths they recorded in the war in 2010, and up 28% from 2009. 1,141 or 55% of these deaths were caused by suicide attacks and improvised explosive devices.

UNAMA/AIHRC attributed 440 (15.9%) of the 2,777 Afghan civilian deaths they recorded for 2010 to U.S.-led military forces, a reduction of 26% from 2009. Of the coalition caused casualties, Airstrikes caused 171, or 39% of these deaths.

In 9% of the civilian deaths, UNAMA/AIHRC were unable to clearly attribute the cause to any one side.

In addition to the civilian deaths, a total of 4,343 civilians were documented by UNAMA/AIHRC to have been wounded in the war in 2010, a jump of 22% from 2009.

=== Civilian and overall casualties (2011) ===
In the first half of 2011, the U.S.-led war in Afghanistan again brought yet higher numbers of civilian deaths as violence intensified and security spiralled downward. According to UNAMA/AIHRC figures, 1,462 Afghan civilians were killed in the first six months of 2011, another 15% jump over the same period in 2010. UNAMA/AIHRC attributed 1,167 (79.8%) of those deaths as having been caused by insurgents and anti-government elements, up 28% from the same period in 2010. UNAMA/AIHRC attributed 207 Afghan civilian deaths as having been caused by U.S.-led military forces, down 9% from the same period in 2010 and representing 14.2% of the civilian deaths. In 6% of the civilian deaths, UNAMA and AIHRC were unable to clearly attribute the cause to any one side.

For the whole year of 2011, the United Nations reported that the civilian death toll numbered 3,021, a record high. In addition, 4,507 Afghans were wounded.

The use of improvised explosive devices increased, with an average of 23 roadside bombs a day which were detonated, discovered, or defused. Suicide attacks also became more complex and sophisticated, targeted killings intensified, ground fighting increased, and civilian deaths from airstrikes also increased.

=== Civilian and overall casualties (2012) ===
A 2012 report by the UN Assistance Mission in Afghanistan noted that the number of Afghan civilians killed or injured in 2012 decreased for the first time since the United Nations began keeping track of such figures. 2,769 civilian deaths and 4,821 injuries were reported in 2012.

=== Civilian and overall casualties (2013) ===
The UN recorded 2,969 civilian deaths and 5,669 injuries in 2013.

=== Civilian and overall casualties (2014) ===
International aid workers in 2014 were still being targeted in addition to the general population of the country. This was brought home by the death of two Finnish aid workers, who were shot and killed while in a taxi by two gunmen on motorbikes, on 24 July 2014. Overall, according to the UN, 3,710 civilians were killed and 6,825 were wounded in 2014, yet another record high.

=== Civilian and overall casualties (2015) ===
The UN estimates that 3,545 civilians were killed and 7,457 injured in 2015.

=== Civilian and overall casualties (2016) ===
The UN estimates that in 2016 3,498 civilians were killed and 7,920 were wounded in Afghanistan.

=== Civilian and overall casualties (2017) ===
The UN estimates that 1,662 civilians were killed from January through June 2017. The ISIL attacked a hospital and killed over 50 patients and staff. A German female aid worker was killed, her Afghan guard beheaded and a Finnish female aid worker kidnapped in May (most likely by ISIL).

=== Civilian and overall casualties (2018) ===
By the end of August, five US troops were killed in the war. The US had around 15,000 troops in Afghanistan. According to Uppsala Conflict Data Program the total number of deaths including civilians and combatants, surpassed 20,000 by the end of 2018.

In a single month of October 2018, Up to 273 Afghan civilians were killed and 550 others injured in separate incidents.

On 28 December 2018 a report issued by UNICEF revealed that during the first nine months of 2018, five thousand children were killed or injured in Afghanistan. Manuel Fontaine UNICEF Director of Emergency Programs said the world has forgotten children living in conflict zones.

== Afghan protestation of civilian deaths caused by international forces ==
=== Afghan President Hamid Karzai's repeated pleas to the foreign military forces ===
From 2002, Afghan President Hamid Karzai repeatedly pleaded with the foreign military forces in his country to avoid killing Afghan civilians in their operations.

- In July 2002, following a US bombing raid in which Afghan officials say 44 people were killed, including many celebrating a wedding and many children, the Afghan president protested to the U.S. military authorities, and urged them to be more careful in their targeting to prevent any more civilian deaths. U.S. President George W. Bush offered his condolences.

We are not happy. We don't want any more Afghan civilian casualties.

This must not occur again.

I have asked that from now onwards everything should be closely co-ordinated between the Americans and the central authority of Afghanistan to make sure no such mishaps happen again and I have conveyed this to the Americans.

— Afghan President Hamid Karzai, July 2002

(Senior Afghan officials were furious that it took five days before President Bush telephoned Mr. Karzai to offer sympathy and that Donald Rumsfeld, the US Defense Secretary, had expressed no remorse or apology.)

- In December 2006, a tearful President Hamid Karzai lamented that Afghan children were being maimed and killed by NATO and U.S. bombs and by terrorism. In a heartfelt speech that brought audience members to tears, Karzai said the cruelty imposed on his people "is too much" and that Afghanistan cannot stop "the coalition from killing our children".
- In May 2007, after heavy aerial bombing by the US military had recently killed 40 to 60 Afghan civilians, including women and children, wounded about 50 more, and destroyed some 100 houses, President Hamid Karzai summoned top foreign generals and diplomats to his palace to reiterate years of complaints over blameless deaths. At a news conference afterward, he said that Afghan lives should be valued too, and the Afghan people could no longer tolerate such casualties:

Civilian deaths and arbitrary decisions to search people's houses have reached an unacceptable level and Afghans cannot put up with it any longer."

Five years on, it is very difficult for us to continue accepting civilian casualties. It is becoming heavy for us; it is not understandable anymore.

We are very sorry when the international coalition force and NATO soldiers lose their lives or are injured. It pains us. But Afghans are human beings, too.

— Afghan President Hamid Karzai, May 2, 2007
- In June 2007, after the deaths of more than 90 civilians in 10 days, President Hamid Karzai accused ISAF and the US-led military coalition in his country of "extreme" and "disproportionate" use of force. In his protestations, the Afghan president said that the foreign military forces in his country had to start working in accordance with his government's wishes.
- On October 28, 2007, in an interview on 60 Minutes, Afghan President Hamid Karzai stated that he had explicitly asked U.S. President George W. Bush to roll back the use of airstrikes – which had killed more than 270 civilians in 17 air strikes to date in 2007 alone – in his country, saying that he had delivered the message privately to Bush using "clear words" in August.

The Afghan people understand that mistakes are made. But five years on, six years on, definitely, very clearly, they cannot comprehend as to why there is still a need for air power.

— Afghan President Hamid Karzai, October 28, 2007
- On December 18, 2008, Afghan President Hamid Karzai again spoke of asking the United States to cooperate with his government in their military operations in his country. In a speech, he said that in the previous month he had again asked that the U.S. military in his country cooperate with his government, sending the U.S. government a list of demands about troop conduct, but did not say if he had received any response back.

Part of that list was that they shouldn't, on their own, enter the houses of our people and bombard our villages and detain our people.

— Afghan President Hamid Karzai, December 18, 2008
- In March 2011, Karzai rejected apologies from President Obama and Gen. David Petraeus for U.S. helicopter gunners killing 9 Afghan boys ages 7–13 who were collecting firewood. "The apology is not enough," Karzai said. "Civilian casualties produced by the military operations of coalition forces are the cause of tension in relations between Afghanistan and the United States of America. The people of Afghanistan are fed up from these brutal incidents and apologies and condemnation cannot cure their pain." In response to the deaths of the boys, Petraeus ordered all field commanders and helicopter crews to again study their rules of engagement. One source claims more than 200 civilians killed in military operations and insurgent attacks in "recent weeks".
- In May 2011, Karzai issued a "final warning" as more civilians were killed in NATO airstrikes. He said the Afghan people can no longer tolerate the attacks, and that the U.S.-led coalition risks being seen as an "occupying force".

=== Afghan public protests over civilian deaths ===
- On July 4, 2002, in the first anti-American protest since the overthrow of the Taliban, about 200 Afghans marched through the streets of Kabul to express their outrage over attacks by U.S. forces which killed scores of civilians, including many children and 25 members of one family. According to Afghan Foreign Minister Abdullah, 44 people were killed and 120 wounded in the U.S. attacks on about a half dozen villages in Uruzgan province, which villagers said included an attack on a pre-wedding party.
- On May 29, 2006, large-scale rioting, fueled by anti-U.S. anger, swept through Afghanistan's capital, Kabul, after a U.S. military truck crashed into a crowd of Afghan pedestrians. Afghan President Hamid Karzai's office said five people were killed in the vehicle crash. The U.S. military, in a statement issued earlier, had said at least one person was killed in the crash and six wounded, two of them critically. Afghan officials called it the worst day of rioting in Kabul since the overthrow of the Taliban regime. At least 8 people were killed and 109 wounded in the widespread anti-U.S. protests through the capital. Video from one rioting site after the crash showed a U.S. military vehicle firing in the direction of a crowd of Afghans. Dozens of protesters outside the U.S. Embassy screamed "Death to Americans!" while embassy personnel retreated to bunkers. "We want America out of this country! We hate America! They have no responsibility!" said protester Ajmal Jan.
- On April 30, 2007, thousands of Afghans staged a protest accusing United States-led coalition and Afghan troops of killing civilians in the western province of Herat. The protesters stormed a government district headquarters in Shindand, south of Herat city, where Western troops have a large base. The anti-U.S. protest came a day after an angry demonstration in eastern Nangahar province over the killing of civilians by coalition and Afghan forces there.
- On May 2, 2007, about 500 Afghan university students protested in the eastern province of Nangarhar alleging six civilians had been killed by U.S.-led coalition troops a few days before. On that same day, Afghan and UN teams announced that their investigations had found that around 50 civilians were killed in days of ground fighting and bombing in a remote valley in the western province of Herat.
- On September 26, 2007, following a raid by foreign troops that left two religious leaders dead, about 500 Afghan protesters shut down the main highway out of Kandahar city with some chanting "Death to Canada" and "Death to foreigners" and calling on foreign troops to leave their country. The protesters accused American and Canadian soldiers of killing the two religious leaders during night raids on houses in Senjaray, a community on the outskirts of Kandahar city. Anger was also directed at Afghan President Hamid Karzai for allowing the foreign military presence in their country.
- On August 23, 2008, about 250 Afghan villagers gathered in angry demonstration to protest the deaths of 76 civilians, most of them children, killed in U.S.-led airstrikes near the village of Azizabad, about 120 kilometres south of Herat city in western Afghanistan.
- On September 1, 2008, hundreds of citizens in the Afghan capital Kabul rushed into the streets and burnt tires on the Kabul-Jalalabad highway protesting the killing of three members of a Kabuli family, including two children, by U.S.-led troops. Residents said the U.S.-led troops, carrying out a pre-dawn raid in Hud Kheil area in the eastern quarter of Kabul, threw hand grenades into a house, killing Noorullah and two of his sons, one of whom was eight months old. Their deaths were the latest in a string of incidents that have angered Afghans and caused a split between the Afghan government and foreign troops.
- On October 16, 2008, protests by crowds against the presence of NATO forces and the Afghan government took place in Lashkar Gah, capital city of Helmand province, after a NATO airstrike killed as many as 18 women and children.
- On December 26, 2008, a crowd of hundreds of Afghans protested in Maywand District in Kandahar province following overnight raids by U.S. military forces, claiming that innocent people were killed in the attack. Local villagers, angered by the military raids, blocked the main highway for three hours and burned tires.
- On March 7, 2009, hundreds of Afghan demonstrators in eastern Afghanistan blocked the path of a U.S. military convoy to condemn an early morning raid in Khost province that killed four people and wounded two. Tahir Khan Sabari, the deputy governor of the province, said the four people killed were civilians, but the U.S. military claimed they were militants. Demonstrators in Khost city threw rocks at the American military convoy, shouted "Death to America", and burned tires, sending up dark plumes of smoke.
- On May 7, 2009, thousands of Afghan villagers shouting "Death to America" and "Death to the Government" protested in Farah city over US bomber air strikes on May 4 that killed 147 civilians. Clashes with police started when people from the three villages struck by US B1-bombers brought 15 newly discovered bodies in a truck to the house of the provincial governor. Four protesters were wounded when police opened fire. Going by the account of survivors, the air raid was not a brief attack by several aircraft acting on mistaken intelligence, but a sustained bombardment in which three villages were pounded to pieces. An Afghan government investigation concluded on May 16, 2009, with the Afghan Defense Ministry announcing an official death toll of 140 villagers. A copy of the government's list of the names and ages of each of the 140 dead showed that 93 of those killed were children, and only 22 were adult males.
- On December 9, 2009, some 5,000 Afghan villagers marched in protest over the killing of civilians in a pre-dawn attack by U.S. troops in Armul village, Laghman province in eastern Afghanistan. President Hamid Karzai's office said the attack had killed 6 civilians, including one woman, while NATO denied that any civilians had been killed in its military attack. A Reuters journalist, on the other hand, saw the bodies of a woman and 12 males, including two teenagers, and the top Laghman provincial council leader said that 13 civilians had been killed. The protesters were chanting slogans against the foreign troops in their country, as well as against Afghan president Hamid Karzai and the provincial governor, when Afghan troops opened fire on them. Four protesters were hit by bullets, two dying instantly and two were taken to a hospital, where residents said they died of their wounds.
- On December 30, 2009, protesters in Jalalabad set alight a US flag and an effigy of President Obama after chanting "Death to Obama" and "Death to foreign forces". In Kabul, protesters held up banners showing photographs of dead children alongside placards demanding "Foreign troops leave Afghanistan" and "Stop killing us". This was in response to reports that U.S.-led forces had shot 10 villagers in their home, including 8 children, during a raid in the Ghazi Khan village in Narang district of the eastern province of Kunar.
- On January 21, 2010, angry Afghan villagers took to the streets in Ghazni province to protest the deaths of civilians they claimed were killed in a raid by NATO troops. NATO's International Security Assistance Force (ISAF) claimed it had killed four insurgents including a 15-year-old boy during their raid in the Qarabagh District of Ghazni province the previous night. But 50 villagers brought five coffins to the provincial capital Ghazni city, claiming that three of the dead were civilians, including two children below the age of seven. The head of the provincial hospital where the bodies were initially taken said that his doctors told him that two children were among the bodies brought to them.
- On January 28, 2010, angry demonstrations took place outside Camp Phoenix, a U.S. military base on the outskirts of Kabul, after NATO troops killed an Afghan religious leader who had been sitting in a parked car with his two young sons while waiting for a NATO ISAF convoy to pass by. According to witnesses, the fourth ISAF vehicle in the convoy opened fire on the parked car without provocation. At least 16 bullet holes were later counted on the car's exterior and Mullah Mohmmad Younas was killed by three bullets in his chest and one in his abdomen. ISAF confirmed the shooting of a civilian, offered sympathies, and said it was investigating.

=== Afghan protests over Taliban killings ===
After the Taliban's killing of 26 young men on 19 October 2008, in southern Kandahar Province in a militant-controlled area – unclear is whether the victims were Afghan government soldiers or recruits or mere civilians looking for work in Iran – the following Friday, 1,000 people in Mihtarlam in northeastern Laghman Province, where most of those killed came from, protested against those Taliban killings.

== Civilian casualties by insurgent forces ==
In 2006, according to Human Rights Watch, 669 Afghan civilians were killed in armed attacks by anti-government forces, primarily Taliban and Hezbi Islami.

In all 2008 until October, 29 aid workers, 5 of whom non-Afghanis, were killed in Afghanistan.

In 2008–2009, according to The Christian Science Monitor, 16 improvised explosive devices were planted in girls' schools in Afghanistan, but there is no certainty who did that.

According to the United Nations, anti-government elements were responsible for 76% of civilian casualties in Afghanistan in 2009, 75% in 2010 and 80% in 2011.

In considering civilian casualties caused collectively by insurgent forces, the armed insurgency in Afghanistan against the government and foreign military forces is composed of many diverse individuals and groups that are motivated by a range of different goals and ideologies, that do not necessarily identify as "Taliban", and that do not act under a single line of authority.

=== Non-Afghan civilian casualties ===
In August 2008, three Western women (British, Canadian, American) working for aid group International Rescue Committee were murdered in Kabul. Taliban claimed to have killed them because they were foreign spies. In October 2008, British charity worker Gayle Williams working for Christian UK charity 'Serve Afghanistan' – focusing on training and education for disabled persons – was murdered near Kabul. Taliban claimed they killed her because her organisation "was preaching Christianity in Afghanistan".

=== Disputed case ===
At Sunday, 19 October 2008, in southern Kandahar Province in a militant-controlled area, Taliban stopped a bus and killed 26 young male passengers of the bus, who they claimed were members of the Afghan security forces. Afghan officials later claimed those victims were not soldiers but innocent civilians from northern Laghman Province, on their way to Iran to find work.

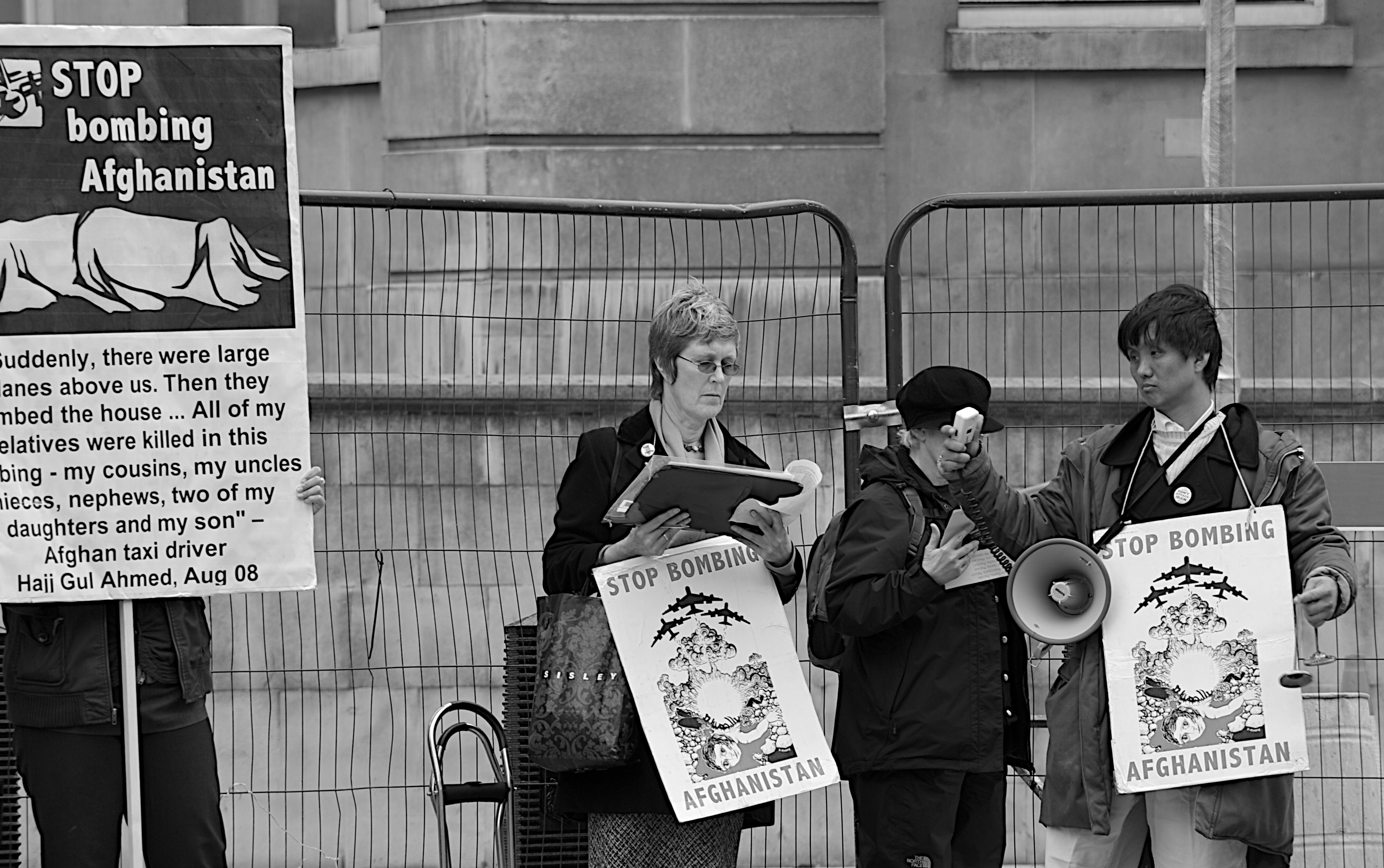
A roll call opposite Downing Street

== International protests against US and allies causing deaths ==
The deaths of thousands of Afghan civilians caused directly and indirectly by the U.S. and NATO bombing campaigns have been a major underlying focus of protests against the war in Afghanistan since 2001.

Protests around the world, starting with large-scale global demonstrations in the days leading up to the official launch of U.S. Operation Enduring Freedom's under George W. Bush and Donald Rumsfeld in October 2001, have taken place every year since.

== See also ==
- Casualty recording
- Azizabad airstrike
- British forces casualties in Afghanistan
- Bagram torture and prisoner abuse
- Canadian Afghan detainee abuse scandal
- Canadian Forces casualties in Afghanistan
- Casualties of the Iraq War
- Chenagai airstrike
- Coalition casualties in Afghanistan
- Criticism of the war on terrorism
- Granai Incident
- International public opinion on the war in Afghanistan
- 2009 Kunduz airstrike
- Protests against the invasion of Afghanistan
