= Haska Meyna wedding party airstrike =

Civilians massacre at a wedding party

- Haska Meyna (Afghanistan)
Date	6 July 2008
Location	Haska Meyna, Haska Meyna District, Nangarhar Province, Afghanistan
Result	47 civilians killed, including 39 women and children and 8 teenagers; another nine wounded

The Haska Meyna wedding party airstrike was an attack by United States military forces on 6 July 2008, in which 47 Afghans were killed. The targeted group was escorting a bride to a wedding ceremony in the groom's village in Haska Meyna District of Nangarhar Province, Afghanistan.

The United States government denied that civilians were killed in the incident. An investigation by the Afghan government disagreed and determined that 47 civilians, including the bride, had been killed.

== Summary of events ==
On 6 July 2008, many Afghan civilians were walking in an area called Kamala in Haska Meyna District of the eastern province of Nangarhar. When the group stopped for a rest, it was hit in succession by three bombs from United States military aircraft. The first bomb hit a group of children who were walking ahead of the main procession, killing them instantly. A few minutes later, the aircraft returned and dropped a second bomb in the center of the group, killing many women. The bride and two girls survived the second bomb, but were killed by a third bomb while trying to escape from the area. Hajj Khan, one of four elderly men who were escorting the party, stated that his grandson was killed and that there were body parts everywhere.

Relatives from the groom's village stated that the state of the dead bodies made it impossible to identify the remains, and the 47 victims were buried in 28 graves. An investigation ordered by President Karzai and led by a nine-person commission of the senate found that 47 civilians including the bride had been killed. Burhanullah Shinwari, a member of the commission, told the BBC that there were 39 women and children among those killed, and that eight of those who died were between the ages of 14 and 18. Another nine people were wounded in the attack.

U.S. forces stated they had been targeting an insurgent force, labeled a "target of opportunity," that was evidently targeting a nearby base with mortars. On 16 July 2008, President Hamid Karzai visited the site where the US-led strikes hit the wedding.

== Cultural references ==
Rock band The Airborne Toxic Event recorded a track protesting the bombing entitled "Welcome to Your Wedding Day" on their second album All at Once.

== See also ==
- Wech Baghtu wedding party airstrike
- 2013 Radda airstrike
- Azizabad airstrike
- Granai airstrike
- Sangin airstrike
- Uruzgan helicopter attack
- List of civilian casualties in the War in Afghanistan
