= Granai airstrike =

2009 mass murder of civilians by American airmen during the Afghanistan War

- Part of the War in Afghanistan (2001–2021)
Date	May 4, 2009
Location	Granai, Bala Buluk District, Farah Province, Afghanistan 32°37′19″N 62°26′06″E

Casualties and losses
- Estimate: 86–147 killed, mostly women and children
- Location within Afghanistan

The Granai airstrike, often called the Granai massacre, refers to the killing of approximately 86 to 147 Afghan civilians by an airstrike by a US Air Force B-1 Bomber on May 4, 2009, in the village of Granai (Pashto: گرانای, also Romanized Garani, Gerani, Granay) in Farah Province, south of Herat, Afghanistan.

The United States admitted significant errors were made in carrying out the airstrike, stating "the inability to discern the presence of civilians and avoid and/or minimize accompanying collateral damage resulted in the unintended consequence of civilian casualties".

The Afghan government said that around 140 civilians were killed, of whom 22 were adult men and 93 were children. Afghanistan's top rights body has said 97 civilians were killed, most of them children. Other estimates range from 86 to 147 civilians killed. An earlier probe by the US military had said that 20–30 civilians were killed along with 60–65 insurgents. A partially released American inquiry stated "no one will ever be able conclusively to determine the number of civilian casualties that occurred". The Australian had said that the airstrike resulted in "one of the highest civilian death tolls from Western military action since foreign forces invaded Afghanistan in 2001".

== Airstrike video ==
A Combat Camera video of the airstrike was made by the bomber aircraft involved. When the Pentagon investigation on the incident was released in 2009, it did not include the video.

By May 2010, WikiLeaks had an encrypted copy of the video it had received from then U.S. Army Specialist Chelsea Manning and was attempting to decrypt it. In a March 2013 statement, Julian Assange disputed prior news reports claiming WikiLeaks had been unable to decrypt the file and alleged that the video "documented a massacre, a war crime."

Assange said WikiLeaks no longer had the video due to former spokesperson Daniel Domscheit-Berg deleting it and other files when he left WikiLeaks in September 2010 and a Swedish Intelligence operation conducted in September 2010 in which other copies of the video were also lost.

== See also ==
- Haska Meyna wedding party airstrike
- Wech Baghtu wedding party airstrike
- Azizabad airstrike
- Sangin airstrike
- Civilian casualties in the War in Afghanistan (2001–2021)
- List of massacres in Afghanistan
- 2009 Kunduz airstrike
