= Azizabad airstrike =

2008 airstrike on Azizabad village during a joint U.S.-Afghan operation

- Part of the War in Afghanistan (2001–2021)
- Azizabad (Afghanistan)
- Location: Azizabad, Herat, Islamic Republic of Afghanistan
- Date: August 22, 2008
- Target: Taliban commander
- Attack type: Aerial attack and ground engagement
- Weapons: US AC-130 ground attack aircraft; small arms and crew-served weapons
- Deaths: Disputed: U.S. Central Command investigation: 33 civilians and 22 people classified as anti-coalition militants; United Nations, Afghan government and Afghan Independent Human Rights Commission investigations: 78–92 civilians

The Azizabad airstrike occurred on the night of 21–22 August 2008 during a joint United States–Afghan military operation in the village of Azizabad in Shindand district, Herat Province, Afghanistan. The operation targeted a Taliban commander, and the ensuing engagement included small-arms fire and close air support from a U.S. Air Force AC-130 gunship. A number of structures in the village, including homes, were damaged or destroyed. Estimates of the number of civilians killed remain disputed: a U.S. Central Command investigation led by Brig. Gen. Michael Callan concluded that 55 people were killed, including 33 civilians and 22 people it classified as anti-coalition militants (ACM), while separate investigations by the United Nations Assistance Mission in Afghanistan (UNAMA), the government of Afghanistan and the Afghan Independent Human Rights Commission (AIHRC) reported that between 78 and 92 civilians, many of them children, had been killed. Among the dead was at least one American security-contracting team allegedly linked to local Taliban figures.

== Summary of events ==
Accounts of the events preceding the airstrike differ. American officials initially stated that Afghan soldiers had been ambushed while in pursuit of a Taliban commander named Mullah Siddiq (also spelled Sediq), and that the attackers then fled to Azizabad. The subsequent CENTCOM investigation instead concluded that the operation had been planned in advance: intelligence indicated that Mullah Sediq and 20–30 fighters would be holding a shura (council meeting) in Azizabad, and the combined U.S.-Afghan force received fire while infiltrating the area, prompting the engagement.

Approximately 90 people were reported killed and eight homes destroyed, according to aid workers, local villagers and a report by the Afghanistan government. UNAMA separately reported that approximately 90 civilians had been killed, based on what it described as convincing eyewitness testimony. The U.S. military's own casualty figures changed substantially over the following weeks; see Casualty estimates and investigations below.

== Casualty estimates and investigations ==
U.S. casualty figures for the operation shifted several times between August and October 2008.

An initial inquiry by Combined Joint Task Force 101, completed within days of the engagement, concluded that between 30 and 35 Taliban fighters and five to seven civilians had been killed. That estimate was disputed almost immediately by the government of Afghanistan, UNAMA and AIHRC, which reported far higher civilian tolls.

On 8 September 2008, a video recorded on a mobile phone emerged showing approximately 40 bodies. The footage had not been independently corroborated as having been filmed in Azizabad. In light of the video and continuing reports from UNAMA, the Afghan government and the International Committee of the Red Cross (ICRC), General David D. McKiernan, the senior U.S. and NATO commander in Afghanistan, requested that U.S. Central Command send a general officer to review the original investigation and its findings. That review was a separate U.S. military inquiry, not an investigation independent of the United States government or military.

The resulting investigation was led by Brig. Gen. Michael Callan of U.S. Central Command. His team visited Azizabad, conducted 28 interviews yielding more than 20 hours of recorded testimony, reviewed 236 documents, and examined 11 videos. On 1 October 2008 the Department of Defense published an executive summary of the Callan report, which concluded that approximately 55 people had been killed: 33 civilians (including at least eight men, three women and 12 children) and 22 people the investigation classified as anti-coalition militants. The report found that U.S. and Afghan forces had not violated the law of war or rules of engagement, and that the use of force had been proportional and taken in self-defense. An internal briefing on the investigation's findings described the result as identifying a "thread of truth" in both the original U.S. account and the higher outside estimates; while the Callan report rejected the claim of approximately 90 civilian deaths, it substantially raised the earlier U.S. figure of five to seven.

The Callan investigation also criticized the methodology of the UNAMA, Afghan government and AIHRC investigations, stating that they relied heavily on villager statements and limited forensic examination, and that their casualty lists were largely identical or closely derivative of one another; the investigation noted that 82 of the 89 names on the UNAMA list matched an earlier list compiled by Azizabad villagers. It concluded that the higher casualty figures were not substantiated by graves, video or other intelligence.

Human Rights Watch subsequently disputed the Callan investigation's conclusions, calling it "deeply flawed" in a January 2009 letter to then-Secretary of Defense Robert Gates. The organization argued that the investigation had dismissed villager testimony as financially or politically motivated, rejected consistent claims that some graves held more than one body, and failed to acknowledge any flaws in the initial, lower U.S. casualty estimates. Human Rights Watch also criticized the investigation's summary for exonerating U.S. forces without disclosing its supporting evidence.

No U.S. condolence payments were made in connection with the operation. The government of Afghanistan reportedly paid $2,000 to the family of each of the 90 civilians it counted as killed and $1,000 to each person it counted as wounded, along with government-sponsored trips to the Hajj.

== Reaction ==
=== Azizabad residents ===
The day after the attack, Saturday 23 August 2008, villagers organised a demonstration against Afghan troops which had been deployed to Azizabad to distribute food and other assistance. Several people were injured during a confrontation between the protesting villagers and army personnel.

=== Government of Afghanistan ===
Afghan President Hamid Karzai described the attack as "tragic" and "irresponsible". Karzai dismissed two senior Afghan military personnel, a general and a major, for "negligence and concealing facts". After a cabinet meeting the government announced that it would seek to renegotiate the terms of the international presence in the country. Some analysts suggested that this announcement was a direct response to the Azizabad event. A government statement called for an end to "airstrikes on civilian targets, unilateral searches of homes and illegal detentions" by international forces.

In February 2009, a primary court in Herat sentenced Mohammad Nader to death for giving "wrong information" to coalition forces which resulted in the Azizabad airstrike. The presiding judge, Qazi Mukaram, told Nader that he was being "sentenced to capital punishment for spying for foreign forces and giving wrong information that caused the death of civilians." Nader denied the charges, saying, "My information was accurate and I did it for the well-being and security of my village."

=== United States Government ===
The Pentagon described the attack as "a legitimate strike against the Taliban" and questioned the higher casualty estimates given by the government of Afghanistan and reported by the media. The US military initially denied that any civilian casualties had occurred, but later acknowledged that some civilians might have been killed and announced its intention to conduct an investigation. Preliminary findings acknowledged that five civilians had been killed, and on 2 September 2008 the U.S. stated that up to seven civilians had been killed, reasserting that the majority of those killed were Taliban fighters. On 1 October 2008, the Department of Defense published the summary of the Callan investigation, which accepted that 33 civilians had been killed; see Casualty estimates and investigations above.

=== United Nations ===
In a statement on the attack, the United Nations reported that "An investigation by the United Nations Assistance Mission in Afghanistan (UNAMA) has found that some 90 civilians, including 60 children, were among those killed during military operations in the strife-torn nation's western Herat province last week." The investigation found "'convincing evidence, based on the testimony of eyewitnesses, and others,' that some 90 civilians were killed – including 60 children, 15 women and 15 men – and another 15 villagers wounded."

=== Other international reaction ===
Russia circulated a draft United Nations Security Council statement on Tuesday 26 August which expressed serious concern about the numerous civilian casualties reportedly caused by the airstrike. It stated that member nations "strongly deplore the fact that this is not the first incident of this kind."

== Security contractors and alleged Taliban links ==
The Callan investigation found it "most likely" that some of the anti-coalition militants killed in Azizabad were also serving as local security contractors for ArmorGroup, a private security firm operating near Shindand Airfield. The investigation noted that airfield expansion had forced ArmorGroup to sub-contract security work, that sub-contracted guards were issued older uniforms with looser controls on weapons and identification, and that there was a documented history of ArmorGroup employees "moonlighting" for other armed groups in the area — employees discovered doing so were fired under company policy. The investigation separately noted contracted demining operations near Shindand Airfield employing Azizabad residents, and stated that munitions recovered by U.S. forces after the operation were consistent with those used in that demining work.

Later reporting examined these relationships in greater depth. A December 2019 USA Today investigation, based on interviews and previously undisclosed records, reported that the operation, part of a mission the U.S. military called Operation Commando Riot, targeted a compound associated with local strongmen who had at times supplied guard forces to ArmorGroup and had, according to the report, developed ties to the Taliban; it reported that eight men working as ArmorGroup or ArmorGroup Mine Action security guards were among those killed. The New York Times had earlier reported, on 7 October 2010, that eight coalition security contractors were killed in the attack, allegedly led by a man referred to as "Mr. White II" whose men included former Taliban fighters. A 2010 inquiry by the U.S. Senate Armed Services Committee into private security contracting in Afghanistan examined the Azizabad incident and assigned responsibility to both ArmorGroup and the Department of Defense for inadequate contractor oversight.

These accounts describe several distinct, sometimes overlapping, categories: individuals formally employed as ArmorGroup security contractors; individuals reported to have Taliban affiliations or sympathies; individuals the U.S. military classified as anti-coalition militants killed in the operation; and the later independent reporting that connected these categories. Sources differ on the extent to which these categories overlapped in Azizabad specifically.

== See also ==
- Granai airstrike
- Sangin airstrike
- Uruzgan helicopter attack
- Haska Meyna wedding party airstrike
