= 2010 in Afghanistan =

- Decades: 1990s; 2000s; 2010s; 2020s
- See also: Other events of 2010; List of years in Afghanistan

Events from the year 2010 in Afghanistan.

== Incumbents ==
- President: Hamid Karzai
- First Vice President: Mohammed Fahim
- Second Vice President: Karim Khalili
- Chief Justice: Abdul Salam Azimi

== January ==
- On January 28, 2010, an International Conference on Afghanistan was held at Lancaster House in London, where members of the international community discussed the further progress on the Petersberg agreement from 2001 on the democratization of Afghanistan after the ousting of the Taliban regime. The one-day conference, hosted by the United Kingdom, the United Nations, and the Afghan government, meant to chart a new course for the future of Afghanistan and brought together foreign ministers and senior representatives from more than 70 countries and international organizations.
- Also in late January 2010, French Foreign Minister Bernard Kouchner explained that France will not send any more combat troops to Afghanistan, reinforcing his country's opposition to joining the U.S.-led surge there.

== February ==
- The Khataba raid refers to the killing of five innocent civilians including two pregnant women and a teenage girl when US special forces raided their house on February 12.
- The Uruzgan helicopter attack refers to the killing of a large number of Afghan civilians including four women and one child. The attack took place on February 21, 2010, near the border between Uruzgan and Daykundi provinces when special operation troops helicopters attacked three minibuses with "airborne weapons".
- In early February Coalition and Afghan forces began highly visible plans for an offensive, codenamed Operation Moshtarak, on the Taliban stronghold near the village of Marja. It began on 13 February and, according to U.S. and Afghan officials, was the first operation where Afghan forces led the coalition. The offensive involved 15,000 US, British and Afghan troops. It was the biggest joint operation since the 2001 invasion that ousted the Taliban. The troops were fighting over an area of less than 100 square miles (260 km^{2}), with a population of 80,000.

== March ==
- On 12 March 2010 Route Trident, a new road built by the British Army and Afghan workers in Helmand province officially opened to traffic.

== April ==
- President Hamid Karzai pledged that tribal leaders would be consulted before any coalition push to oust the Taliban from Kandahar, their spiritual home in southern Afghanistan.
- Insurgents in Afghanistan thought the previous year was their most successful year of operations since 2002, according to a new Pentagon report, but US officials were increasingly confident because of the surge of American troops and believed that insurgent perceptions of their own strength will begin to change, too.
- A magnitude 5.3 earthquake struck in mountains north of Afghanistan's capital, killing at least seven people and injuring 30, officials said.

== May ==
The Taliban announced an increased offensive during spring and launched several attacks against International Security Assistance Forces (ISAF) and Afghan government forces. Attacks included a car bomb against a NATO convoy in Kabul which killed 18 people including six NATO soldiers and separate attacks against two of the largest ISAF bases in Afghanistan, Bagram and Kandahar Air Bases.

== June ==
- June 6 - Amrullah Saleh, director (since 2004) of Afghanistan's intelligence service National Directorate of Security, resigned from his post. Saleh was seen as strongly committed to fighting terrorism.
- General Stanley McChrystal is forced to resign after a controversial Rolling Stone magazine article. He was replaced by David Petraeus.
- On June 10, at least 40 civilians were killed in a suicide bomb attack at a wedding in the Arghandab District of southern Kandahar Province. Afghan authorities accused the Taliban, but they denied involvement in the attack.

== July ==
- July 1 - Whilst carrying out an operation against insurgents in Haji Wakil, Helmand Province, Corporal Seth Stephens of the Special Boat Service was killed during a heavy firefight whilst clearing a compound, as a result of his actions during that operation, he was awarded the Conspicuous Gallantry Cross
- July 20 - International Conference on Afghanistan started in Kabul. "The Government of Afghanistan will bring together representatives of more than 70 partner countries, international and regional organizations and financial institutions to deliberate and endorse an Afghan Government-led plan for improved development, governance, and stability. The International Conference on Afghanistan, the first of its kind in Kabul, will mark the culmination of several months of intensive study and rigorous policy debate on Government priorities implemented through national programs, to deliver on the key goals of economic growth and job creation. Building on commitments made at the recent international London Conference, the conference aims to support a peaceful, stable and prosperous Afghanistan. It will be opened by H.E. President Hamid Karzai, and UN Secretary General Ban Ki-Moon, and co-chaired by Foreign Minister Rassoul and UN Special Representative Staffan de Mistura."

== August ==
- A Christian charity said it had no plans to leave Afghanistan despite the murders of 10 members of its medical aid team and repeated that the organization does not attempt to convert Muslims to Christianity. The 10 members - six Americans, two Afghans, one Briton and a German - were gunned down after they were accosted by gunmen after finishing a two-week mission providing medical care to impoverished villagers in Nuristan province. The Taliban claimed responsibility and alleged the group were spies and tried to convert Muslims.
- Jobless rural youth are the focus of a new Afghan security plan designed to help defeat Taliban insurgents mostly in the south, east and southeast of the country. The government, which already has about 200,000 national police (ANP) and army personnel at its disposal, says it also needs local combatants to help fight Taliban insurgency.
- Mohammed Zia Salehi, an aide to President Hamid Karzai and the chief of administration for the country's National Security Council, appears to have been on the Central Intelligence Agency's payroll for many years. It is unclear exactly what Mr. Salehi does in exchange for his money, whether providing information to the spy agency, advancing American views inside the presidential palace, or both.

== September ==
- The 2010 Afghan parliamentary election to elect members of the Wolesi Jirga took place on 18 September 2010. Final results were not expected until at least October. The Afghan Independent Election Commission - established in accordance with the article 156 of the Constitution of Afghanistan for the purpose of organizing and supervising all elections in the country - postponed the poll from its original date of 22 May to September 18.
- The number of U.S. and NATO air strikes over Afghanistan has spiked since General David Petraeus replaced General Stanley McChrystal. U.S. Air Force statistics show a 172 percent increase, with 700 separate missions flown in September 2010. At the same time the ICRC reports that the number of War casualties in a Kandahar hospital are "hitting record highs". Mirwais Regional Hospital had nearly 1,000 new patients with weapon-related injuries in August and September, what was double the figure a year earlier. Reto Stocker, the Red Cross chief in Kabul, said the casualties being seen at Mirwais hospital were only "the tip of the iceberg". Georgette Gagnon, Director of Human Rights for United Nations Assistance Mission in Afghanistan (UNAMA) announced that casualties inflicted on ordinary people in northern Afghanistan over the past six months this year has doubled compared to the same period last year, the casualties increased especially among children with an increase of 55 percent.
- A U.S. and Afghan military offensive, called Operation Hamkari, focusing on the Afghan province of Kandahar was launched soon after the Muslim holiday of Ramadan, which ended September 10. The Kandahar offensive was originally planned to be launched during July, but was delayed for further preparations. The offensive did not begin as one specific operation, but rather a series of operations in Kandahar City and its surrounding districts throughout the late summer and fall in 2010. Places where operations were conducted included Malajat, Zhari, Arghandab and the Horn of Panjwayi. Operations conducted in 2010 is credited with putting severe pressure on insurgent operations and increasing security in some key areas such as in Panjwayi. Unlike operations of previous years, Operation Hamkari featured the extensive use of Afghan National Security Forces, including the Afghan Border Police (ABP), led by Spin Boldak ABP Commander Gen. Abdul Razziq. Operation Bawaar was the Canadian aspect of the 2010 Kandahar offensive. It involved the hold and build in the district of Zangabad as well as the Ground Line of Communication (GLOC) project to Mushan – all in an area known as the Horn of Panjwai.
- September 17- Acting Sergeant Dipprasad Pun of 1st Battalion, Royal Gurkha Rifles was singlehandedly on sentry duty at a checkpoint guarding a compound he and 3 other men were occupying near Babaji in Helmand province, (the platoon Pun was part of had pushed out a patrol to dominate a road to the east in readiness for the next day's parliamentary elections). That night, 12-30 Taliban insurgents surrounded and attacked his post with AK-47s and RPGs, Sergeant Pun single-handedly fought off the attack, using up all his ammunition (more than 400 rounds), 17 hand grenades and a Claymore mine before battering the last fighter with the tripod of his machine gun-saving the lives of his 3 comrades and prevented his post from being overrun. For his actions he was awarded the CGC.

== October ==
- A US soldier is in custody following the death of a Taliban prisoner from apparent gunshot wounds. He later pleads guilty to murder before a U.S. court-martial.
- France denies any connection between its decision to remove troops from Afghanistan in 2011 and Osama bin Laden's pledge to attack French troops.

== November ==
- US Secretary of State Hillary Clinton defended US strategy in Afghanistan after Afghan President Hamid Karzai called on Washington to reduce its military footprint and Taliban leaders ruled out peace talks.
- Meanwhile, the NATO Summit in Lisbon will mark a turning point in the prosecution of the war in Afghanistan as it lays out a roadmap to end combat operations by 2014, top U.S. envoy to the region Richard Holbrooke said. Hamid Karzai addressed the summit, saying that he wants NATO to return control of the country by the end of 2014. Before the summit, British Prime Minister David Cameron said that the "NATO Summit in Lisbon is set to mark the starting point for passing responsibility for security progressively to Afghan forces." While meeting with Karzai, the members agreed to a gradual phase-out of combat operations until 2014. After that date, NATO states would continue to contribute to training and advising the Afghan National Army. Secretary-General Rasmussen said "we will launch the process by which the Afghan government will take leadership for security throughout the country, district by district." Though the members set the 2014 target date, many have already stated that their withdrawals will take place outside of any NATO decision.
- Ahead of the summit, seven NATO troops died after attacks in Afghanistan on November 14, the NATO-led International Security Assistance Force (ISAF) said—the deadliest day for NATO forces in Afghanistan since October 14, when 7 NATO troops were killed. There have been 34 coalition casualties in Afghanistan so far this month, according to a CNN count. The losses came as Afghan troops and ISAF wrapped up a four-day operation in the Pech River valley of volatile Kunar Province, not far from the Pakistan border, which may have killed more than 40 insurgents.
- Afghanistan's election commission disqualified 21 candidates from the September 18 parliamentary elections for alleged fraudulent activities, a spokesman said. 19 of the candidates were winning or leading their races, according to partial election results, while two others had failed to win seats.

== December ==
- Afghanistan's election commission, defying President Hamid Karzai, certified the final tally from September 18 elections with a controversial decision to give all 11 seats in Ghazni Province, where Taliban kept the Pashtun majority from the polls, to members of the ethnic Hazara minority. The Afghan attorney general declared the publication of election results illegitimate and opened a criminal probe against officials at both election commissions (Afghan and international), accusing them of accepting bribes and falsifying vote tallies.
- US President Barack Obama made a surprise visit to Afghanistan and told cheering US troops that they are succeeding in their vital mission fighting terrorism. But after he flew in secrecy for 14 hours, foul weather kept him from a meeting in Kabul to address frayed relations with President Hamid Karzai. Just days later, U.S. Secretary of Defense Robert Gates made a surprise visit to Afghanistan to meet with officials and American troops on the same day British Prime Minister David Cameron was traveling there.
- U.N. Assistant Secretary-General for Humanitarian Affairs Catherine Bragg said some 7.4 million Afghans were living with hunger and fear of starvation and one in five children die before the age of five. Afghanistan ranks 155th out of 169 countries on the U.N. Human Development Index and civilian casualties are at their worst levels since 2001 with now 150,000 foreign troops present. An exclusive Channel 4 News investigation has found that the number of war wounded civilians and children falling victim to the fighting has increased dramatically in southern Afghanistan.
- A nationwide poll by international news outlets showed drops since 2009 in Afghans' confidence in the future of their country and the ability of US and Coalition forces to protect them; they also appear more willing to negotiate with the Taliban. However, in Helmand Province where US Marines have conducted intense counterinsurgency operations, and Kandahar Province, residents said aspects of security and living conditions had improved significantly.
- Sgt. Robert Stevens pleaded guilty for firing at unarmed Afghan civilians as part of a plea bargain. He was sentenced to 9 months in exchange for testifying against 11 US army soldiers, of who five face murder charges for allegedly killing Afghan civilians at random and keeping bones and skulls as trophies.
- U.S. President Barack Obama released a strategy assessment of the war that says U.S. troops are making gains, but serious threats remain and there will likely be several more years of U.S. involvement. The review also says that U.S. military operations have disrupted the Pakistan-based al-Qaida terrorist network and halted Taliban momentum in the south, but the Afghan government hasn't proved it can take over cleared areas, nor has Pakistan done enough to eliminate al-Qaida and Taliban havens. Critics said the assessment appeared to be an attempt to postpone decisions on the pace of U.S. troop withdrawals until next year, and with U.S. public support for the war at record lows the president and his aides seemed to emphasize their reduced goals.
- As 2010 ends, the inauguration of a new Parliament in just weeks threatens to worsen ethnic tensions and instability and to drive an important part of President Hamid Karzai's political base into the arms of the insurgency, Afghans and foreign officials warn. Insecurity, disaffection and fraud, particularly in the south, left the country's largest and most important ethnic group, the Pashtuns, with sharply reduced representation, and the disputed results have pushed the country to the brink of a constitutional crisis. Meanwhile, a roadside bomb blew up next to a minibus in the Lashkar Gah-Sangin district in Helmand province on the main road running from the city of Kandahar to Herat, killing at least 14 civilians, officials said. A spokesman for the Helmand governor's office said four were wounded in the blast and the dead included women and children. President Hamid Karzai condemned the bombing as a "bloodthirsty" attack, saying the explosive was "planted by the enemy of the Afghan people." NATO described the incident as a "despicable attack" aimed at civilians.

== Casualties in 2010 ==
- With 711 Operation Enduring Freedom and International Security Assistance Force (ISAF) deaths, 2010 has been the deadliest year for foreign military troops since the U.S. invasion in 2001, continuing the trend that has occurred every year since 2003. In 2010, improvised explosive device (IED) attacks in Afghanistan wounded 3,366 U.S. soldiers, which is nearly 60% of the total IED-wounded since the start of the war. Of the 711 foreign soldiers killed in 2010, 630 were killed in action. 368 of those were killed by IEDs, which is around 36% of the total IED-killed since the start of the war to date.
- The UN Assistance Mission in Afghanistan (UNAMA) recorded 1,271 Afghan civilian deaths in the American-led war in the first half of 2010. It attributed 920 Afghan civilian deaths as having been caused by anti-government elements in the first half of 2010, representing 72% of the total for that period, and 223 Afghan civilian deaths as having been caused by international-led military forces in the first half of 2010, representing 18% of the total for that period. In 128 (10%) of the deaths, UNAMA was unable to clearly attribute the cause to any one side.
