= 2009 in Afghanistan =

- Decades: 1980s; 1990s; 2000s; 2010s; 2020s
- See also: Other events of 2009; List of years in Afghanistan

Events from the year 2009 in Afghanistan

== Incumbents ==
- President: Hamid Karzai
- First Vice President: Ahmad Zia Massoud then Mohammed Fahim
- Second Vice President: Karim Khalili
- Chief Justice: Abdul Salam Azimi

== Events ==
=== January ===
- 10 January - Tribesmen use vehicles to block the road to protest a raid by Pakistani counter-narcotics forces that left one villager dead. The protesters withdraw 4 days later after police promise to take their complaints to provincial authorities.

=== February ===
- February 6–7 - British and Afghan forces carry out Operation Diesel near Sangin, Helmand Province.

=== April ===
- 1 April -
  - Four suicide attackers storm Kandahar provincial council offices, killing 13 people including senior government officials; the attackers are disguised in Afghan military uniforms.
  - Taliban spokesman Zabihullah Mujahid dismisses a U.S. reconciliation offer, insisting foreign troop withdrawal is the only way to end conflict.
- 7 April - Afghan soldiers kill three insurgents, and three soldiers are wounded, during an ambush in western Farah.
- 9 April - A suicide bomber targets the counternarcotics police in Lashkar Gah, Helmand Province, killing five people including two police officers.
- 12 April - Prominent female politician Sitara Achakzai is assassinated by Taliban gunmen in Kandahar after a council meeting.
- 13 April - The Taliban publicly execute a young couple in Nimroz Province for trying to elope, shooting them in front of a mosque.
- 15 April - About 3,000 new U.S. troops are deployed near Kabul to push back the Taliban, improving security but increasing an expectation of short-term violence to rise.
- 16 April - Afghan police arrest the two men accused of killing Sitara Achakzai.

=== May ===
- 4 May - The Granai airstrike kills 86-147 people, mostly children, when American aircraft bomb a village in Farah Province.

=== June ===
- 19 June - Operation Panther's Claw is launched to secure key areas in Helmand; there is heavy fighting and significant casualties, including Lt Col Rupert Thorneloe’s death. The first stage is declared successful 8 days later, followed by efforts to hold territory.
- 21 June - Two U.S. servicemembers are killed and six wounded in an indirect-fire attack on Bagram Airfield; Afghan and coalition forces also detain four suspected militants in Ghazni province.

=== July ===
- 2 July - Operation Strike of the Sword begins. It is a major US-led offensive in Helmand province targeting Taliban strongholds, involving 4,000 Marines and Afghan troops, resulting in partial coalition gains and improved security before the presidential elections.
- 18 July - A U.S. F-15E Strike Eagle fighter jet crashes in eastern Afghanistan, killing both crew members.
- 19 July - A British soldier is killed by an explosion in Helmand province; a civilian Mi-8 transport helicopter crashes at Kandahar Air Field, killing 16 people.
- 20 July - Four U.S. soldiers are killed by a roadside bomb in eastern Afghanistan; a British Tornado GR4 fighter jet crashes at Kandahar Air Field, but both crew members are ejected safely with minor injuries.

=== August ===
- 4-5 August - U.S. Army Rangers raid an enemy camp in Khost Province, killing 20 insurgents and destroying weapons; Staff Sgt. Michael E. Norton rescues two comrades under heavy fire.
- 20 August - 2009 Afghan presidential election

=== September ===
- 11 September - The International Council on Security and Development reports the Taliban has a permanent presence in 80% of Afghanistan and substantial presence in 17%, but critics say the methodology exaggerates control.
- 3-4 September - A battle by Spanish and Italian forces of NATO's Afghan branch against Taliban forces and militant Tajik tribals erupts. 1 Spanish soldier and 3 insurgents are injured, and 13 insurgents are killed.
- 4 September - The Kunduz airstrike kills up to 179 people. An American F-15E fighter jet strikes two fuel tankers captured by Taliban insurgents; a large number of civilians are also killed in the attack.
- 9 September - A Special Boat Service–Afghan unit, backed by SFSG, rescues journalist Stephen Farrell from the Taliban in Kunduz; several Taliban are killed, along with one SFSG soldier, Farrell's interpreter, and two civilians.

=== October ===
- 28 October - An attack on a guesthouse housing UN election staff kills five UN personnel and three Afghans, causing the relocation or removal of 600 international UN staff.

=== November ===
- 6 November - Ambassador Eikenberry warns Hillary Clinton that more troops will delay Afghan self-reliance and prolong U.S. withdrawal.

=== December ===
- 7 December - Afghan President Karzai declares that it may be five years before his army is ready to take on the insurgents. Karzai also mentions that Afghanistan's security forces will need U.S. support for another 15 to 20 years.
- 17 December - The Taliban offered to give the U.S. "legal guarantees" that they will not allow Afghanistan to be used for attacks on other countries. There was no formal American response.
- 16-18 December - Operation Septentrion: An ISAF mission in Uzbin Valley is conducted by French, US, and Afghan troops to reclaim Taliban-held areas; brief combat leaves several US wounded and at least one Taliban dead.
- 27 December - Night raid on Narang: A NATO-authorized night raid in Narang kills 10 civilians, mostly schoolchildren, sparking condemnation and protests.

== Deaths ==
In overall 2009, 520 NATO soldiers killed. 317 US soldiers, 108 UK soldiers and 95 Other NATO soldiers killed in 2009.

== See also ==
- 2008 in Afghanistan
- other events of 2009
- 2010 in Afghanistan
- Timeline of the War in Afghanistan (2001-present)
- Coalition combat operations in Afghanistan in 2009
