= 2014 in Afghanistan =

- Decades: 1990s; 2000s; 2010s; 2020s
- See also: Other events of 2014; List of years in Afghanistan

The following lists events from 2014 in Afghanistan.

== Incumbents ==
- President: Hamid Karzai (until September 29), Ashraf Ghani (starting September 29)
- Chief executive officer: Abdullah Abdullah (starting September 29)
- First Vice President:
  - Until March 9: Mohammed Fahim
  - March 9–31: Vacant
  - March 31 – September 29: Yunus Qanuni
  - Starting September 29: Abdul Rashid Dostum
- Second Vice President: Karim Khalili (until September 29), Sarwar Danish (starting September 29)
- Chief Justice: Abdul Salam Azimi

== Events ==
=== January ===
- January 6 – A suicide car bomber detonates at a police checkpoint in Ghazni Province, killing three police officers.
- January 8 – A book released by former U.S. Defense Secretary Robert Gates criticizes President Barack Obama for his handling of the War in Afghanistan.
- January 9 – The government of Afghanistan announces the release of 72 Taliban fighters from jails, despite American objections that they pose a security threat.
- January 11 – A four-year-old Afghan boy is killed by U.S. troops.
- January 17 – Twenty-one people are killed in a suicide bombing attack on a Kabul restaurant.
- January 26 – A suicide bomber attacks an army bus in Kabul, killing two soldiers and two civilians.

=== February ===
- February 10 – A car bomb detonates in Kabul, killing two contractors working with ISAF.
- February 13 –
  - Corporal Cameron Baird becomes the 100th Australian to be awarded a Victoria Cross, for his actions in combat in Uruzgan Province on June 22, 2013, which led to his death.
  - Afghanistan releases 65 prisoners from the Parwan Detention Facility despite concerns by the United States that the men were responsible for attacks on NATO and Afghan forces.
- February 24 – Senior Taliban commander Asmatullah Shaheen Bhittani is killed in Khyber Pakhtunkhwa, Pakistan.

=== March ===
- March 1 – A welcome home parade in Darwin marks the official end of Australia's active involvement in the Afghanistan War.
- March 6 – A NATO airstrike mistakenly hits an Afghan military outpost in Logar Province killing five Afghan soldiers.
- March 11 – Gunmen in Kabul kill Swedish Radio foreign correspondent Nils Horner.
- March 12 – Three Taliban insurgents are killed by a team of Afghan police and private commandos after attacking a former National Directorate of Security headquarters in Kandahar. The Taliban claims they killed four commandos and five policemen, which police deny.
- March 18 – A suicide rickshaw bomber detonates in a marketplace in Maymana, killing 15 people and wounding dozens.
- March 20 –
  - Four suspected Taliban members attack the luxurious Kabul Serena Hotel, killing at least nine people, including four foreigners.
  - Suicide bombers attack a police station in the city of Jalalabad resulting in at least 11 deaths and 22 people being injured.

=== April ===
- April 2 – A suicide bomber wearing a military uniform strikes a voter registration office in Kabul, killing six police officers.
- April 4 – Two members of the Associated Press are shot by an Afghan wearing a police uniform in Khost. One of them, Pulitzer Prize winner and photojournalist Anja Niedringhaus, is killed. The other is seriously injured.
- April 5 – The country goes to the polls to vote in the first round of the 2014 Afghan presidential election.
- April 24 – A policeman shoots dead three American medical staff in Kabul. The policeman is reported to have shot himself after the attack.
- April 26 – Five British ISAF personnel are killed in a military helicopter crash in Kandahar province.
- April 26 – The death toll from recent flooding in northern Afghanistan rises to 123.
- April 26 – Afghan Presidential elections are set to go to a second round between former foreign minister Abdullah Abdullah and Ashraf Ghani after no candidate won an absolute majority in first round.

=== May ===
- May 2 – A landslide strikes the town of Hobo Barik in Badakhshan province with at least 350 people dead and over 2000 people missing.
- May 4 – The Government of Afghanistan declares a day of national mourning for the victims of the mudslides.
- May 8 – A roadside bomb near the Afghan border in North Waziristan, Pakistan, kills eight Pakistani soldiers.
- May 21 – The Taliban launch attacks in Badakhshan and Laghman provinces, killing 10 policemen and three civilians.
- May 23 – Gunmen attack the Indian consulate in Herat Province.
- May 27 – Barack Obama, the President of the United States, announces that 9,800 U.S. troops will stay in Afghanistan for a year after the withdrawal of combat troops in December.
- May 27 – The White House accidentally reveals the name of the CIA's top intelligence official in Afghanistan to approximately 6,000 journalists during U.S. President Barack Obama's visit to Bagram Airfield.
- May 31 – Sergeant Bowe Bergdahl, previously the only United States military prisoner held captive in Afghanistan, is released in exchange for five Taliban prisoners held at Guantanamo Bay.

=== June ===
- June 6 – Abdullah Abdullah of the National Coalition of Afghanistan, a frontrunner in the Afghan presidential election, survives a bombing attempt.
- June 7 – Flash flooding in Baghlan province kills at least 65 people and forces thousands of people to relocate.
- June 9 – Five NATO International Security Assistance Force troops are killed in fighting the Taliban.
- June 10 – Five American soldiers, an Afghan soldier, and an interpreter in the Zabul Province are killed when a NATO air strike accidentally targeted them.
- June 14 – Voters in Afghanistan go to the polls for the second round of voting with the Taliban threatening polling booths. Dozens of people are killed across the country.
- June 21–27 – 2014 Afghanistan protests took place during the second round of the 2014 Afghan presidential election campaign.
- June 24 – An Afghan man who saved the life of a Navy SEAL requests asylum in the United States after the Taliban has declared they will try to kill him.

=== July ===
- July 2 – A suicide bomber attacks an Afghan National Army air force bus in Kabul killing at least five people.
- July 7 – A preliminary count indicates that former finance minister Ashraf Ghani is favorite to win the election.
- July 8 – The Taliban claims responsibility for an attack in central Afghanistan that claims the lives of 10 civilians, four Czech members of the International Security Assistance Force and two Afghan police officers.
- July 12 – A cross border attack by the Afghan Taliban kills three Pakistan Army soldiers in Bajaur Agency of the Federally Administered Tribal Areas.
- July 12 – The disputed Afghan presidential election is to be recounted in full following an agreement between the two leading candidates Abdullah Abdullah and Ashraf Ghani.
- July 15 – A car bomb explodes at a market in the eastern Afghanistan province of Paktika, killing at least 89 people and injuring scores more in one of the deadliest attacks of the war.
- July 17 – Explosions and gunfire are reported near Kabul International Airport as militants temporarily capture a building under construction.
- July 22 – A Taliban suicide bomber blows himself up outside Kabul International Airport, killing three foreign advisers and an Afghan interpreter.
- July 24 – In Herat, two Finnish women working for a foreign aid organization are shot and killed.
- July 26 – Insurgents stop minibuses in Ghōr Province and execute 14 Shiite Muslims.
- July 29 – A suicide bomber kills Hashmat Karzai, the cousin of the President of Afghanistan and a regional powerbroker, in the city of Kandahar.

=== August ===
- August 5 – A U.S. major general Harold J. Greene is killed, and a German brigadier general and several American troops are among the 15 wounded, in an attack by an Afghan soldier gunman – who was killed by Afghan soldiers – at Kabul's Marshal Fahim National Defense University.
- August 14 – A roadside bomb detonates next to a police car in Laghman Province, killing three police officers and injuring another four.
- August 23 – A recount of votes begins after contenders Abdullah Abdullah and Ashraf Ghani reach a deal with the assistance of United States Secretary of State John Kerry.
- August 30 – Taliban insurgents attack the National Directorate of Security building in Jalalabad resulting in at least six deaths.

=== September ===
- September 5 – Iranian air traffic control requires a plane chartered by US-led coalition forces in Afghanistan to land over issues with the flight plan. The flight then resumed without further incidents.
- September 8 – A suicide bomb attack kills the police chief of southern Kandahar Province.
- September 15 – Two teams of Marines raiders from the 2nd Marine Raider Battalion were inserted on a landing zone when they were engaged by insurgents, a US Navy corpsman was awarded the Silver Star for his part in the ambush.
- September 16 – A large bomb explodes in Kabul resulting in the death of three international troops (including a U.S Army Major) and five injuries.
- September 21 – Afghanistan's rival presidential candidates, Ashraf Ghani and Abdullah Abdullah, sign a power-sharing deal that establishes a unity government with Ghani as president and Abdullah as chief executive.
- September 26 – The Taliban gains control of the Ajristan District in Ghazni Province after a week of battle.
- September 29 – Ashraf Ghani is sworn in as new president of Afghanistan.
- September 30 – A double suicide attack killed seven people and wounded 21 others including Afghan soldiers in Kabul.
- September 30 – the US and Afghanistan signed the Bilateral Security Agreement (BSA). A similar agreement ("status of forces agreement") was signed the same day with the NATO.

=== October ===
- October 1 – Taliban suicide bombers attack an Afghan National Army convoy in Kabul, killing at least seven people and injuring 19.
- October 8 – A suicide bomber kills at least four people and wounds 16 in Helmand province.
- October 13 – A Taliban attack killed 22 Afghan military in northern Afghanistan.
- October 14/15 – Members of the National Directorate of Security captured two senior leaders of the Haqqani Network in a special operations raid in Khost province.
- October 21 – A Kabul roadside bomb kills at least four Afghan National Security Force soldiers with six other soldiers and six civilians injured.
- October 26 – Camp Bastion, the last remaining British base in Afghanistan, and Camp Leatherneck, an American base next to it, are handed over to the Afghan Government.
- Unknown – After being found and identified by British counter-terrorism forces, Afghan intelligence forces and U.S. special operations forces raided a house in Nazyan district in Nangarhar Province, capturing Abu Bara al-Kuwaiti; a senior al-Qaeda leader. They also made one of the most significant intelligence hauls since Operation Neptune Spear, which later led to the death of Abdul Rauf Aliza, Afghan sources say Abu Bara was killed in a U.S. airstrike rather than captured.

=== November ===
- November 10 – Ten policemen, including a commander, are killed by bomb blasts in Jalalabad and Logar Province.
- November 18 – A suicide bombing attack in Kabul kills at least two people.
- November 23 – A suicide bomber killed 45 people and wounded 60 others during a volleyball game in southern Afghanistan.
- November 27 – A suicide attack in Kabul killed six people including a Briton.
- November 29 – Sun Yuxi, China's Special Envoy for Afghanistan, for the first time publicly stated that he had held a meeting with Taliban representatives in Peshawar. The goal was to discuss possible peace negotiation modalities.

=== December ===
- December 1 – A suicide bomb kills at least nine, including two policemen, at a funeral for a tribal elder in Baghlan Province.
- December 2 – Rangers from Bravo Company, 1st Battalion, 75th Ranger Regiment assaulted enemy combatants in Nangarhar Province which resulted in a six-hour direct fire engagement eliminated more than 25 enemy combatants, one ranger was wounded, whilst two more were awarded the Silver Star, additionally, two Rangers received Bronze Star Medals with valor and two Rangers received the Joint Service Commendation Medal.
- December 11 – A Taliban suicide bomber kills at least six Afghan National Army soldiers in Tangi Tarakhil on the outskirts of Kabul.
- December 13 – Taliban insurgency
  - Gunmen assassinate Atiqullah Rawoofi, the head of the Secretariat of the Supreme Court of Afghanistan, in the outskirts of Kabul.
  - Twenty-one people die in attacks across Afghanistan including two American soldiers.
- December 25 – United States President Barack Obama praises U.S. troops and reflects on the U.S. withdrawal from Afghanistan during his annual Christmas message from Hawaii.
- December 28 – International Security Assistance Force formally ends its combat mission and the Afghan war.
