= 2012 in Afghanistan =

- Decades: 1990s; 2000s; 2010s; 2020s
- See also: Other events of 2012; List of years in Afghanistan

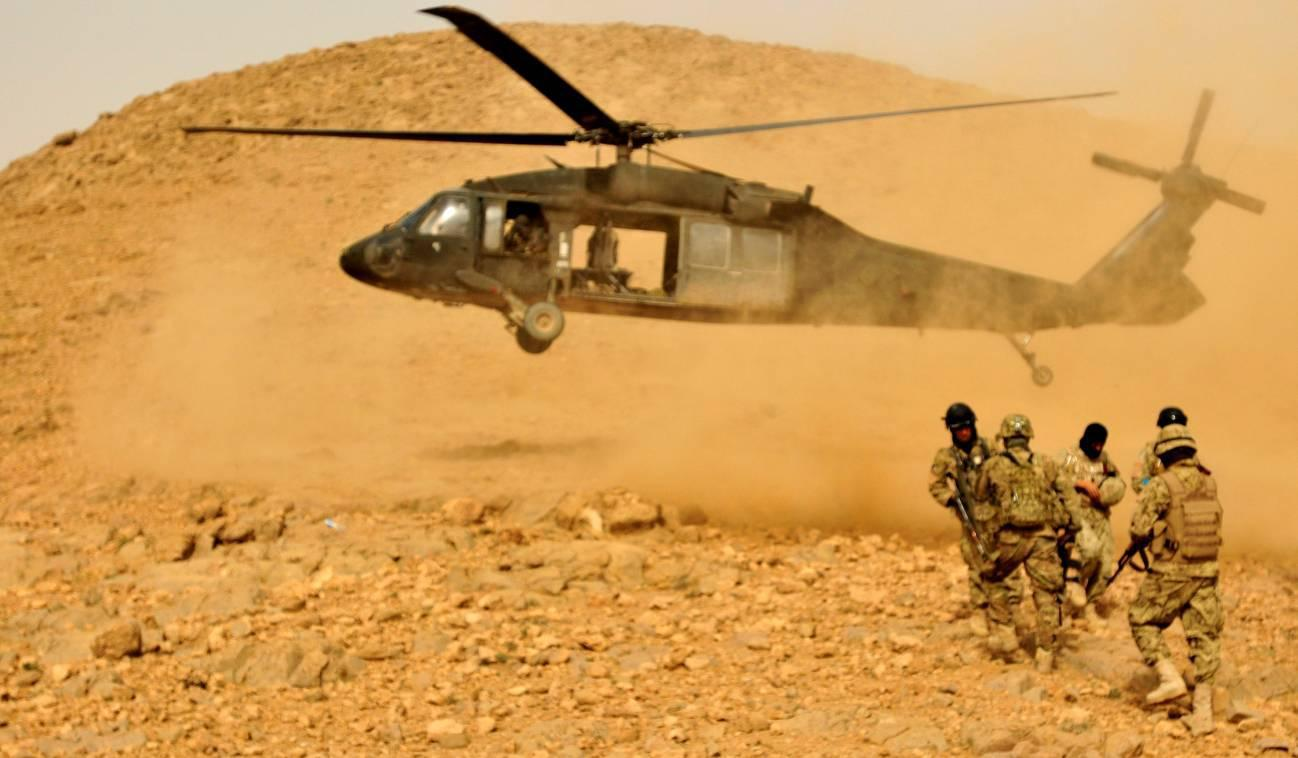
US and Afghan soldiers on a mission to disrupt Taliban operations in Kandahar Province, March 16.

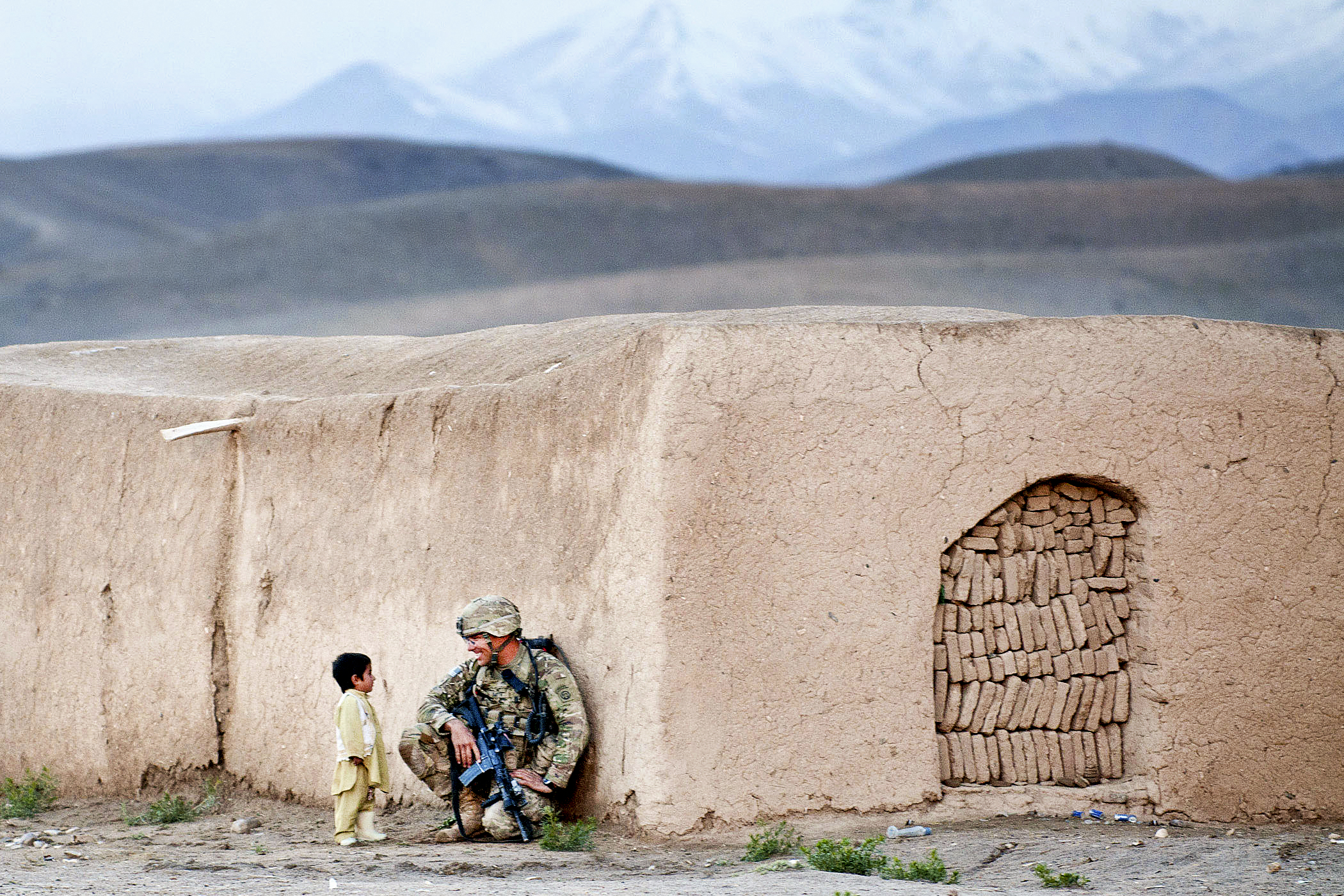
Sgt. Joshua Smith, US Army meets an Afghan boy in Ghazni province, April 28, 2012.

Events from the year 2012 in Afghanistan.

== Incumbents ==
- President: Hamid Karzai
- First Vice President: Mohammed Fahim
- Second Vice President: Karim Khalili
- Chief Justice: Abdul Salam Azimi

== Events ==
=== January ===
- January 1 - President Hamid Karzai said police will arrest members of a family accused of torturing and illegally detaining their son's teenage wife Sahar Gul for the past six months while trying to force her into a life of crime, and that whoever used violence against the 15-year-old in northeastern Baghlan Province must be punished.
- January 3 - War in Afghanistan (2001–present)
  - A suicide bomber kills four civilians and a police officer in Kandahar.
  - At least twelve people are killed in three bombing attacks in southern Afghanistan.
- January 20 - Taliban fighters in Afghanistan were enraged by a video which shows U.S. marines urinating on three corpses, believed to be insurgents, and some said they did not understand their leadership's relatively measured response to the tape; meanwhile U.S. General John R. Allen, who commanded international troops in Afghanistan, accused the Taliban's one-eyed leader, Mullah Muhammad Omar, of having "lost all control" of his frontline fighters after several suicide bombings in the restive south killed almost 20 people, mostly civilians.
- January 21 - French Defence Minister Gerard Longuet said the four French soldiers killed and 16 wounded at the Gwan military unit in Kapisa Province, eastern Afghanistan, were shot by Taliban "infiltrated for a long time" in the ranks of the Afghan army; the killings prompted France to suspend work with Afghan counterparts and consider an earlier timeline for withdrawal. Subsequently, French President Nicolas Sarkozy, accompanied by Hamid Karzai, announced that French forces would withdraw from Afghanistan a year ahead of schedule, in 2013, and that France would urge other NATO countries to do the same. Meanwhile, the U.S. Department of Defense identified six Marines who were killed in Afghanistan when their helicopter crashed; the Taliban claimed credit but there was no report of enemy activity in the area.
- January 21 - America's special envoy to the region Marc Grossman talked peace and reconciliation with Hamid Karzai in Kabul, though the Afghan president made it clear that Afghans should be in the driver's seat; Grossman will meet again with Karzai in discussions aimed at achieving a peaceful resolution to conflict with Taliban insurgents. Hours before the meeting, Karzai said he personally held peace talks recently with the insurgent faction Hizb-i-Islami, appearing to assert his own role in a U.S.-led bid for negotiations to end the country's decade-long war.
- January 31 - An Afghan woman was killed by her husband and mother-in-law, for not producing a son, three months after giving birth to her third daughter.

=== February ===
- February 1 - War in Afghanistan (2001–present)
  - The London Times reports that a secret NATO report claims that the Taliban, backed by Pakistan, is set to regain control over Afghanistan after international forces withdraw from the country.
  - Pakistan Air Force jets bomb militant positions in the Orakzai and Kurram Agency areas near the border with Afghanistan with claims that 31 alleged insurgents were killed.
- February 4 - The United Nations Assistance Mission in Afghanistan estimates that civilian deaths in the war in Afghanistan rose to a record level in 2011 of 3021 with insurgents responsible for most of the deaths.
- February 10 - The United States Secretary of Defense Leon Panetta tells the Marine Corps to re-investigate and take appropriate action against snipers who posed with a logo resembling that of the Nazi Schutzstaffel in Afghanistan.
- February 21 - US General John R. Allen, the head of the International Security Assistance Force in Afghanistan commissions an inquiry into allegations that Qurans were burnt at an American Air Force base as Afghans protest.
- February 22 - 2012 Afghanistan Quran burning protests
  - Hundreds of Afghans hold violent protests against the alleged burning of Qurans at the Bagram Airbase north of Kabul.
  - The United States Embassy in Kabul goes into lockdown as a result of the protests.
- February 23 - 2012 Afghanistan Quran burning protests
  - The Taliban urges Afghans to target foreign bases and kill Westerners in response to burnings of the Koran at a US base as a third day of violent protests occurs, with six people having been shot dead so far.
  - Afghan protesters attack a Norwegian base in Faryab province on the Turkmenistan border.
- February 24 - At least 12 people are killed in the deadliest day of protests so far resulting from U.S. soldiers incineration of copies of the Koran.
- February 25 - 2012 Afghanistan Quran burning protests
  - Two U.S. officers are killed inside the Ministry of Interior in Kabul.
  - Four people are killed in protests in Kunduz.
- February 26 - France and Germany follow the United States and United Kingdom in withdrawing civilian staff from Afghan government facilities following the killing of two senior NATO officers.
- February 27 - A suicide car bomber explodes at Jalalabad Airport, killing nine.

=== March ===
- March 2 - Afghanistan's National Religious Council submitted a resolution to president Karzai stating that Afghan women should follow a strict code of conduct. Some provisions of the code angered woman rights activists. For instance, the code stated that women should not mingle with strange men in places such as schools, markets and offices. The code also allowed husbands to beat their wives. President Karzai approved the council's resolution, causing criticism.
- March 4 - The burning of Qurans at a NATO base in Afghanistan advanced the Pakistani-controlled Taliban's cause and any repeat of similar "negligence" by Western forces would be disastrous, according to the Afghan army chief of staff; "The enemy (Taliban) will enlarge it and make use of it in such a way to instigate everybody," General Sher Mohammad Karimi said in an interview.
- March 11 -An American soldier left his base and went from house to house in Alokozai and Barakzai in Kandahar Province, killing 17 people in their homes, Afghan officials told CNN; the dead include nine children and three women, plus five wounded, leading Hamid Karzai to say "The murdering of innocent people intentionally by an American soldier is an act of terror that is unforgivable." ISAF commander Gen. John R. Allen said the "deeply appalling incident in no way represents the values of ISAF and coalition troops or the abiding respect we feel for the Afghan people."
- March - Afghans "have run out of patience" with foreign troops, the country's MPs have warned, after a US soldier killed 16 Afghan civilians. The strongly-worded resolution came as US officials issued an alert, fearing reprisals after the Kandahar rampage. Nine children were among those killed. Afghan President Hamid Karzai said the act was "unforgivable" and Taliban militants have vowed revenge. The soldier is being questioned. Nato has promised to deliver justice. The killings could further fuel calls for a more rapid withdrawal of US troops from Afghanistan. They come amid already high anti-US sentiment in Afghanistan following the burning of Quran at a Nato base in Kabul last month. US officials have repeatedly apologised for that incident.

=== April ===
- 5 April - A suicide bomber kills at least 12 people and injures many more in Afghanistan's Faryab province.
- 11 April - Afghan President Hamid Karzai raised the possibility to hold presidential elections in 2013, instead of 2014 as scheduled. He issued the concern that having the complete security handover and a presidential election take place in one and the same year could be a problem. Karzai said, "This is a question that I've had and I've raised it in my inner circle. I've not had a final decision yet, but it will not be soon."
- 15 April - April 2012 Afghanistan attacks

=== May ===
- 1 May - The US and Afghanistan signed the Strategic Partnership Agreement, a document that pledges US support to Afghanistan until 2014.
- 13 May - Moulavi Arsala Rahmani, a key member of Afghanistan's High Peace Council is assassinated; responsibility is claimed by the Mullah Dadullah Front.
- 21 May - At the 2012 NATO Summit in Chicago, the Alliance endorses an Afghan Exit Strategy. Most of the ISAF troops are to be withdrawn by the end of December 2014.

=== June ===
- US Defense Secretary Leon Panetta said during his visit to Kabul that the US was "reaching the limits of its patience" with the observed lack of willingness on part of Pakistan to tackle the issue of bases used by insurgents inside Pakistan's territory.
- 2 June - SAS and US Delta force conduct joint operation which successfully rescues five foreign aid workers from a gang of insurgents in Shahr-e-Bozorg district near the Afghan - Tajikistan border. SAS and Delta Force arrived by helicopter and took part in "long march" to a cave where the 5 aid workerswere being held in a maze of caves. The two teams then engaged insurgents in a firefight and overpowered the heavily armed kidnappers, and the hostages were rescued in the cave assaulted by the SAS. 11 insurgents were killed in the assault and there were no SAS fatalities or injuries.
- 21–22 June 2012 - Hostage incident at Lake Qargha: Armed Taliban militants took over 50 people hostage at a lakefront resort, 21 would eventually be killed.

=== July ===
- 7–9 July - over 70 countries attended the Tokyo Conference on Afghanistan, pledging to deliver billions of dollars of aid to the country.
- 30 July - A bomb placed inside a mosque exploded in Tarinkot city, the provincial capital for Uruzgan province, during the morning prayer. The mullah of the mosque and the provincial judge, was killed and four other people present there were injured.

=== August ===
- 10 August - Forward Operating Base Delhi Massacre in Garmsir village, Helmand Province, Afghanistan
- 28 August - Operation Helmand Viper has occurred in Helmand province in southern Afghanistan

=== September ===
- 18 September - Operations with Afghan troops were restricted following a number of attacks by rogue Afghan troops or police, or insurgents dressed as such.
- 20 September - A drawdown of 23000 servicement returned US forces to their pre-surge level of about 68000.

=== October ===
- 1 October - A suicide attack killed three NATO soldiers, four Afghan policemen and seven civilians. The blast also wounded 37 people.
- 13 October - A suicide bomber killed two US intelligence officers and four afghan officials.

=== November ===
- 23 November - A suicide bomber killed three civilians and wounded 90 people including NATO soldiers in eastern Afghanistan.

=== December ===
- 2 December - A Taliban attack on a NATO base in eastern Afghanistan killed three Afghan soldiers and wounded a number of NATO soldiers.
- 8/9 December - DEVGRU operators rescue an American doctor in Laghman Province who was kidnapped by the Taliban three days previously. At least 4 Taliban insurgents were killed whilst one Navy SEAL was killed (he was posthumously awarded the Navy Cross) whilst another SEAL was awarded the Medal of Honor for his actions during the mission.
