= 2008 in Afghanistan =

- Decades: 1980s; 1990s; 2000s; 2010s; 2020s
- See also: Other events of 2008; List of years in Afghanistan

Events from the year 2008 in Afghanistan.

== Incumbents ==
- President: Hamid Karzai
- First Vice President: Ahmad Zia Massoud
- Second Vice President: Karim Khalili
- Chief Justice: Abdul Salam Azimi

== January ==
- January 14: The 2008 Kabul Serena Hotel attack leaves six people dead.
- January 25: A small element of U.S. and Afghan National Army soldiers led by Staff Sergeant Robert James Miller was conducting a combat reconnaissance patrol through the Gowardesh Valley, Kunar Province, when they engaged a force of 15-20 insurgents occupying prepared fighting positions. After calling in close air support, Staff Sergeant Miller led a small squad forward to conduct battle damage assessment when over 100 insurgents ambushed the squad, Miller displayed extraordinary valour by drawing fire away from his squad, killing 10 insurgents in the process. His actions cost him his life, but he saved the lives of 7 members of his team and 15 Afghan National Army soldiers. He was awarded the Medal of Honor.

== February ==
- February 17: 2008 Kandahar bombing kills 100 people, the deadliest suicide bombing of the war till that time.
- February 18: The Taliban leader Mullah Abdul Matin and one of his sub-commanders, Mullah Karim Agha, were travelling near Gereshk when they were ambushed and killed by a Special Boat Service team inserted nearby via helicopter.
- February 26: A Danish Leopard 2 was hit by an explosive device, damaging one track. No one was injured and the tank returned to camp on its own for repairs.

== March ==
- The U.S. government suspended, on March 27, 2008, AEY Inc. of Miami, Florida, a company hired by the U.S. military, for violating its contract. The company is accused of supplying corroded Chinese surplus ammunition made from 1962 to 1974, instead of the higher-quality Hungarian-made ammo from MFS 2000 Inc, to the Afghan National Army and police. United States Army-documents showed that since 2004 the company had entered agreements with the U.S. government that totaled about $10 million. The papers also revealed the company received much larger orders in 2007 with contracts totaling more than $200 million to supply ammunition, assault rifles, and other weapons. Army criminal investigators were sent to look at the packages in January 2008. The House Oversight Committee announced plans to hold a hearing into the matter on April 17, 2008, at which the 22-year-old international arms dealer Efraim Diveroli and president of AEY Inc. would face a congressional inquiry. The committee reported in June 2008.

== April ==
- April 4 - Mikhail Krotov, General Secretary of the Interparliamentary Assembly of the Commonwealth of Independent States, said that Afghanistan had indicated its desire to become a CIS member. Afghanistan's parliament had the observer status in the Assembly since 2006.
- On April 27, Karzai escaped another attempt on his life: gunmen opened fire during a military parade celebrating the 1992 victory of the Mujahideen over the People's Democratic Party of Afghanistan communist government. The firefight lasted about a quarter of an hour, with 3 dead and over 10 wounded.
- On April 29, 2,300 U.S. Marines assaulted the town of Garmsir in Helmand province, a region of Afghanistan where the Taliban had a stronghold.

== May ==
- May 13–23:, Norwegian-led ISAF forces conducted a military operation in Badghis province.
- May 26: 70 Rangers from D Company, 2nd Battalion, 75th Ranger Regiment conducted a daylight raid to capture a high-value Taliban target in Paktia Province. After being inserted by helicopter near their target building, the Rangers came under heavy fire from 40 Taliban. Whilst clearing the target building, 4 rangers were wounded and at least 1 Taliban fighter was killed. 1 Ranger was awarded the Medal of Honor.

== June ==
- June 10: Gora Prai airstrike in Pakistan kills 11 Pakistani paramilitary troops.
- June 13: Sarposa Prison attack. Taliban attack the Sarposa Prison, freeing up to 1,000 prisoners.
- June 27: a NATO Apache helicopter killed Mullah Sadiqullah; a key Taliban planner, facilitator and bomb-maker in Helmand Province.

== July ==
- July 5: A Danish Leopard 2A5 hit an IED in Helmand Province, resulting in the driver's death. During the same contact with Taliban forces, a second tank was caught in an explosion but none of the crew were wounded.
- July 6: The Deh Bala wedding party bombing refers to the killing of a large number of Afghan civilians, mostly women, who were walking the bride of a wedding ceremony to the groom's village in Dih Bala district of Nangarhar province.
- July 7: The 2008 Indian embassy bombing in Kabul kills 58, including four Indians. India blames the Pakistani ISI for the attack.
- July 12: British Special forces killed Mullah Bishmullah, a key Taliban leader at a command and control level in Now Zad. Along with the death of Mullah Sadiquallah in late June and Bishmullah's killing, Taliban suffered a significant blow to their logistics and facilitation chain in northern Helmand.
- July 13: Battle of Wanat. Taliban fighters attack a NATO base, killing nine American soldiers. A missile strike from a British aircraft killed Abdul Rasaq, a Taliban leader who led fighters around Musa Qala.

== August ==
- August 19: The Taliban kill 10 French soldiers in the Uzbin valley ambush.
- August 22: The Azizabad airstrike kills between 78 and 92 civilians mostly in Herat province during a US-led attack on the village of Azizabad.
- August 27: Operation Eagle's Summit begins in Helmand Province.

== September ==
- September: United States-Pakistan skirmishes.
- September 3: Angoor Ada raid by US special forces into Pakistan.

== October ==
- In October 2008, The Washington Post ran an editorial by former Navy Secretary John Lehman:

What made the Afghan campaign a landmark in the U.S. Military's history is that it was prosecuted by Special Operations forces from all the services, along with Navy and Air Force tactical power, operations by the Afghan Northern Alliance and the CIA were equally important and fully integrated. No large Army or Marine force was employed.

- On October 1, 2008, the top American general in Afghanistan, David McKiernan, warned that the situation in Afghanistan could get a lot worse. The international forces within Afghanistan have not been able to hold territory they have cleared because of the lack of troops. For this reason the general called for an extra three combat brigades (roughly 20,000 troops). Without this urgent rush of troops the Taliban would be able to get back into the communities that were once cleared by international troops. The general went on to say that things could get a lot worse before they get better.
- On October 1, 2008, a suspected U.S. drone fired a missile against militants inside Pakistan's North-West Frontier Province near the Afghan border. It is believed that six people died in the incident. Attacks of such have drawn a stiff response from Islamabad, accusing the United States of violating their airspace.

== December ==
- December 11: start of Operation Red Dagger
- December 19: US vows to send 3,000 more troops to Afghanistan.
- On December 30, 2008, Pakistani security forces shut down the supply line when they launched an offensive against Taliban militants who dominate the Khyber Pass region. After three days of fighting, they declared the Khyber Pass open.

== Deaths ==
- Abdul Samad Rohani, 25, Afghan journalist, shooting.
- Abdullah Wardak, Afghan governor of Logar Province, suicide attack.
- Malalai Kakar, 41, Afghan senior policewoman, shot.
