= 2013 in Afghanistan =

- Decades: 1990s; 2000s; 2010s; 2020s
- See also: Other events of 2013; List of years in Afghanistan

The following lists events that happened in 2013 in Afghanistan.

== Incumbents ==
- President: Hamid Karzai
- First Vice President: Mohammed Fahim
- Second Vice President: Karim Khalili
- Chief Justice: Abdul Salam Azimi

== Events ==
=== January ===
- January 6 – Suicide bombers kill four in an attack in Spin Boldak.
- January 16 – The Afghan National Directorate of Security headquarters in Kabul are attacked by a team of suicide bombers, leaving a security guard dead and 17 others injured.
- January 26 – A suicide bombing at a market in Kunduz kills at least ten people and wounds up to twenty others.
- January 27 – At least twenty members of the Afghan National Police have been killed in bomb attacks over the past day with eight police officers killed in the latest attack in Kandahar.

=== February ===
- February 10 – American general Joseph F. Dunford, Jr. takes over command of NATO forces in Afghanistan, replacing John R. Allen.
- February 13 – Afghan officials say that a NATO airstrike in the Kunar Province kills 10 civilians and injures more including 3 children.
- February 24
  - Two guards and an Afghan police officer are killed in coordinated suicide bombing attacks in Jalalabad and Logar Province in eastern Afghanistan, while a third such attack on the National Directorate of Security in Kabul is foiled.
  - President of Afghanistan Hamid Karzai orders the United States to leave Wardak province amid allegations of torture associated with US Special Forces.
- February 27 – Taliban insurgents kill 17 Afghan government-affiliated militia personnel in an overnight attack in Andar District of eastern Ghazni Province.

=== March ===
- March 2 – The news website Tolo News quotes the head of the All-Pakistan Ulema Council Tahir Ashrafi as endorsing suicide bombers in Afghanistan, 'as long as there are US troops on the ground'. Ashrafi denies saying the words, yet still the alleged statement causes concern in Afghanistan.
- March 9 – At least 19 people are killed by two suicide bombings in Kabul, and in Khost Province, as Chuck Hagel, the United States Secretary of Defense, visits the city.
- March 10 – President of Afghanistan Hamid Karzai alleges that the U.S. armed forces are collaborating in some way with the Afghan Taliban in an effort to ensure that some troops remain after the scheduled 2014 pullout.
- March 11 – Two US and three Afghan soldiers are killed in Wardak Province in the latest insider attack against coalition forces. In a separate incident, two Afghan civilians are shot dead by American soldiers after failing to stop at a checkpoint near Kabul.
- March 11 – Five U.S. service members are killed after a helicopter crash during a rainstorm in Daman district of Kandahar Province.
- March 13 – A suicide bomber kills 10 spectators, including the district police chief, during a local gaming event in Kunduz province of northern Afghanistan.
- March 25 – The United States agrees to hand over Bagram Jail, its main detention facility in Afghanistan, to the country's government.
- March 25 – United States Secretary of State John Kerry meets with the President of Afghanistan Hamid Karzai to talk about the two countries' strained relations.
- March 26
  - Australia announces that it will be closing its base in Tarinkot in Urozgan Province, with the majority of troops returning home by the end of this year.
  - A suicide attack on a police station in Jalalabad, kills five police officers while seven attackers die.
  - One British soldier is killed and nine are wounded by Taliban insurgents in an attack on a patrol base with a truck bomb and small arms fire in Helmand Province, Nad Ali District.
- March 26 – The Arab League summit begins in Qatar, Doha, with the Syria conflict and possible talks between the Afghanistan government and the Taliban among the key issues.
- March 31 – President of Afghanistan Hamid Karzai meets with Sheikh Hamad bin Khalifa Al Thani, the Emir of Qatar, to discuss plans for the Taliban to open an office in Doha in order to help solve the conflict in Afghanistan.

=== April ===
- April 3 – more than 46 people are killed and more than 100 injured following an attack by Taliban militants armed with suicide vests on a courthouse in Farah.
- April 4 – An airstrike conducted by NATO kills at least five people in the eastern Afghan province of Ghazni.
- April 5 – An explosive-laden donkey is used in an attack on a police security post in the Alingar District of Laghman Province in eastern Afghanistan, killing a policeman and wounding three civilians.
- April 6 – A bombing in Qalat, capital of the southern Kabul Province, kills three U.S. soldiers and two U.S. civilians, along with an Afghan doctor. An American civilian dies in another attack in the east of the country.
- April 7 – An airstrike conducted by NATO kills at least 12 people in the Afghan province of Kunar.
- April 8
  - Afghanistan President Hamid Karzai denounces the reported death of eleven children at the hands of NATO forces in Kunar Province and orders a government inquiry into the killings.
  - Taliban fighters are suspected of being responsible for a bus explosion that kills at least nine people and injures more than twenty others in Maidan Wardak Province.
- April 9 – A helicopter crash kills two American NATO soldiers in eastern Afghanistan.
- April 12 – Thirteen soldiers of the Afghan National Army are killed and one is injured in an ambush in the eastern Kunar Province.
- April 22–11 people are kidnapped in Afghanistan after the helicopter they were in was forced to land. The Taliban takes responsibility for the abductions.
- April 24 – A 5.7 magnitude earthquake strikes 25 kilometers from Jalalabad, leaving 33 people dead and another 115 injured. Heavy damage of buildings are reported across Nangarhar Province.
- April 26 – Six police officers are poisoned and fatally shot in Kunduz Province while another one is missing.
- April 26 – At least 30 people die in southern Afghanistan after a bus crashes into the wreckage of a truck attacked by Taliban insurgents.
- April 27
  - The Taliban announces the start of their spring offensive, signaling plans to step up attacks as the weather warms across Afghanistan, making both travel and fighting easier.
  - A plane crashes in Southern Afghanistan killing four military personnel.
- April 29 – A Boeing 747 crashes near an American military base in Bagram, killing all seven American crew members on board.
- April 30 – A roadside bomb kills three members of NATO's ISAF force in Afghanistan.

=== May ===
- May 3 – A U.S. KC-135 tanker aircraft on its way to Afghanistan crashes in northern Kyrgyzstan after a mid-flight explosion.
- May 4 – Five US soldiers are killed when a bomb detonates in Kandahar. Additionally, three more are killed in separate incidents.
- May 6 – An Afghan border police guard is killed and two Pakistani troops are injured in border violence.
- May 13 – Three Georgian soldiers are killed and several wounded in a large-scale insurgent attack on an ISAF base in the Helmand Province.
- May 14 – The Taliban kills four US soldiers in Kandahar Province.
- May 16 – A suicide bomber killed 15 people including two US soldiers and four NATO employees in Kabul. The explosion also wounded 39 people.
- May 24 – Afghan security forces battle Taliban insurgents in central Kabul. An Afghan policeman, a Nepalese soldier, and numerous insurgents are killed.
- May 29 – Insurgents storm a Red Cross guest house in Jalalabad.

=== June ===
- June 2 – Taliban insurgents attack two checkpoints in the Kamdesh District in eastern Afghanistan killing four Afghan police officers.
- June 3 – A suicide bombing in eastern Afghanistan kills at least 20 people, including 10 children.
- June 4
  - Three corpses are dug up near a former U.S. military base in Narkh bringing the number of corpses whose deaths locals blame on the presence of United States personnel to 10; people flood the streets of Maidan Shar calling for the U.S. to leave.
  - Two British soldiers are court martialed for "sexually and racially abusing civilians" during their time in Afghanistan.
- June 5 – U.S. staff sergeant Robert Bales avoids the death penalty by pleading guilty to the murder of 16 Afghan civilians, including nine children.
- June 6 – Seven Georgian servicemen are killed and nine wounded in an insurgent attack with a truck bomb on the ISAF base in Shir Ghazay.
- June 8
  - In Afghanistan, a man wearing an Afghan military uniform attacks and kills three American soldiers, in what appears to be an insider attack on U.S. International Security Assistance Force soldiers, based in east Afghanistan's Paktika Province.
  - In a separate unrelated incident, an Italian soldier is killed and three are wounded when a child throws a grenade at a NATO convoy in west Afghanistan's Farah Province.
- June 10 – Seven heavily armed Taliban militants launch a coordinated attack near the main international airport of Kabul and seize a five-story building under construction nearby. Afghan security forces retake the building, killing all seven militants and sustaining no military or civilian casualties.
- June 11 – A bomb detonates near the Afghan Supreme Court killing eight people and wounding dozens.
- June 18
  - A bomb explodes in Kabul killing three people and wounding six.
  - Four United States troops are killed near Bagram Airfield.
- June 25 – Taliban forces attack near the Presidential Palace in Kabul.

=== July ===
- July 2 – Militants attack NATO headquarters in the north of Kabul resulting in at least two deaths.
- July 9
  - An Afghan soldier kills a Slovak soldier and wounds six others.
  - Seventeen people are killed by a roadside bomb in.
- July 18 – Eight Afghan labourers are killed on their way to work at a U.S. military base in Logar Province.
- July 23 – A bomb kills eight people in Awardak Province, including three United States Army soldiers, four Afghan National Army soldiers and an Afghan interpreter.
- July 29 – The New Zealand Ministry of Defence announces that it will investigate claims that it collected telephone metadata on Jon Stephenson, a freelance journalist for The McClatchy Company in Afghanistan.

=== August ===
- August 1 – NATO forces in Afghanistan launch an investigation after a US airstrike in Nangarhar Province kills five Afghan policemen and injures another two.
- August 3 – Nine children die in a suicide bombing near the Indian consulate in Jalalabad.
- August 5 – A bomb explodes at a market in Kandahar, killing at least four people.
- August 5 – More than 160 people are killed in flash floods across Afghanistan and Pakistan.
- August 8 – A bomb explodes at a cemetery in Nangarhar Province, killing at least 14 people.
- August 11 – Three U.S. soldiers are killed in an attack in Paktia province.
- August 11 – Flash floods in Kabul province kill 22 people.
- August 17–10 people are killed in a camp by insurgents in western Afghanistan.
- August 23 – A routine joint patrol composed of British paratroopers, US Marines and Afghan soldiers targeted a village to search for illegal weapons in Helmand Province. After insertion by a Chinook helicopter, the patrol was ambushed by the Taliban, the resulting skirmish lasted approximately 45 minutes which killed 11 insurgents and wounded four more, a US Marine officer was also wounded, one soldier was awarded the Victoria Cross.

=== September ===
- September 8 – The Taliban kills four Afghan National Army troops in an attack on an intelligence office near Kabul.
- September 13 – Taliban insurgents attack the United States consulate in Herat, with two members of the Afghan National Police reported as killed and about 20 civilians injured.
- September 15 – At least 27 miners die in an Afghanistan coal mine collapse.

=== October ===
- October 15 – A bomb in a mosque in Logar Province kills the governor Arsala Jamal and results in other injuries.
- October 26 – A gunfight between Afghan and foreign soldiers on the outskirts of the capital Kabul, kills at least one Afghan serviceman and injures a number of other soldiers.
- October 27 – A roadside bomb in eastern Afghanistan kills 18 people.
- October 28 – Australia declares its war in Afghanistan over while the Prime Minister, Tony Abbott, visits Afghanistan.

=== November ===
- November 13 – Poppy farmers in Afghanistan report record yields for their opium crops.
- November 16 – Suicide car bombing in Kabul kills six people and injures twenty.

=== December ===
- December 4 – The United States stops shipping supplies to Afghanistan through Pakistan due to protests over drone attacks.
- December 6 – Royal Marine Sergeant Alexander Blackman is given a life sentence by a court martial for the murder of an unarmed insurgent.
- December 15 – The last Australian combat troops leave Afghanistan.
- December 23 – Captain Richard Holloway of the Special Boat Service was killed by Taliban gunfire whilst on a joint SBS-Afghan forces raid (with air support) on Taliban insurgents in a valley east of Kabul, ahead of the Afghanistan elections.
- December 27 – A suicide bomber attacks a foreign military convoy on the eastern outskirts of Kabul, killing at least three foreign soldiers, police and the NATO-led International Security Assistance Force.
