= 2011 in Afghanistan =

- Decades: 1990s; 2000s; 2010s; 2020s
- See also: Other events of 2011; List of years in Afghanistan

Events from the year 2011 in Afghanistan.

== Incumbents ==
- President: Hamid Karzai
- First Vice President: Mohammed Fahim
- Second Vice President: Karim Khalili
- Chief Justice: Abdul Salam Azimi

== January ==
- Pakistan and a visiting delegation of Afghan officials charged with trying to broker peace with the Taliban agreed to hold a peace "jirga" between the two countries; a spokesman for Pakistan's foreign ministry said the decision was made during a visit to Islamabad by two dozen members of Kabul's High Committee for Peace, led by its chairman, former Afghan premier Burhanuddin Rabbani. At the same time, U.S. Sen. Lindsey Graham's suggestion that the United States consider establishing permanent military bases in Afghanistan drew the ire of the Afghan Taliban, who said in an online message the comments proved that the U.S. was intent on occupying Afghanistan and depriving its citizens of their rights.
- U.S. military commanders in Afghanistan are seeking ways to maintain the level of combat troops there, even as they make plans to cut the overall number of American personnel to meet the White House's mandate to start shipping out forces by summer. The Pentagon announced it was temporarily sending 1,400 more Marines to southern Afghanistan in the coming weeks to build on security gains there. Meanwhile, the Dutch government said it plans to send a new training mission to Afghanistan, less than a year after the country's military presence led to the previous government's fall and the withdrawal of troops.
- Hundreds of protesters in Kabul accused Iran of stopping fuel tankers from crossing the border into Afghanistan; demonstrators marched outside the Iranian embassy accusing Tehran of interfering in Afghanistan's affairs.
- Most of the 249 elected members of parliament met at Hotel Inter-Continental Kabul to discuss whether to proceed with the inauguration of parliament despite President Hamid Karzai's decision to postpone the ceremony. Karzai's office had announced a one-month inauguration delay, saying that the special court on election fraud needed more time to investigate complaints from losing candidates. The decision drew criticism from the United Nations' mission in Afghanistan, and concern from analysts that it could spark ethnic divisions and more violence. In the end, Karzai inaugurated the newly elected parliament, but took a dig at the international community in his inauguration address, saying Afghans should "put an end to foreign interference and ambiguity about elections and democracy." Karzai's special court was investigating as many as 56 of the 249 parliament members, senior Western officials said. These officials said they had been promised that only a fraction of that number would actually be targeted by the court.
- In his second message to the French people in less than six months, Al Qaeda leader Osama bin Laden said that by keeping troops in Afghanistan, French President Nicolas Sarkozy had given the "green light" to "kill your captives immediately." A French ministry spokesperson responded the French government would not change their stance on Afghanistan, and that their presence was meant to help the Afghan people.
- The United States destroyed the village of Tarok Kolache.
- A prominent Afghan doctor, his rights activist wife and four of their children were all killed in a suicide attack on a Kabul supermarket, President Hamid Karzai said, offering condolences on the deaths. The shop was frequented by foreigners, located at the heart of an embassy district, just a few hundred metres from the British, Canadian, Japanese and several other missions. The Taliban claimed responsibility for the suicide attack, saying they were targeting the head of a foreign security company. But the city police chief's office said that while there were foreigners among the wounded, only Afghans had died. Meanwhile, the deputy governor of Kandahar province was killed in a suicide attack and his driver was wounded, according to government spokesmen. The attacker strapped a bomb to a motorcycle and drove near the deputy governor's car when he was on his way to the office.

== February ==
- On February 5, 2011, British special forces and Afghan troops intercepted a convoy in Nimruz province killing several Taliban fighters, the convoy was carrying an Iranian shipment of 48 122mm rockets to the Taliban that would have allowed them to double the range of their rocket attacks (by 12 miles).
- Lt Gen David M. Rodriguez, second in command of US and NATO forces, said those forces could succeed in the war even if Pakistan does not shut down Taliban sanctuaries on their side of the border such as North Waziristan, an apparent shift from last year's US strategic review and at odds with recent statements by Chairman of the Joint Chiefs of Staff Adm Mike Mullen. Rodriguez also anticipated the Taliban would renew attacks in the spring, but were more likely to focus on assassinating Afghan government leaders and planting roadside bombs than fighting US or NATO soldiers directly and incurring more casualties.
- Just days later, a suicide bomber killed a district governor and six other people in the district of Chardara in Kunduz Province, where the insurgency was well entrenched. And at least 19 people were killed and 49 wounded when armed attackers targeted a police headquarters in Kandahar, Afghan and NATO officials said—among the dead were 15 policemen, one Afghan soldier, a government security officer and two civilians. There were suicide bombers involved, and nine children were wounded, said a statement from ISAF. After first responders arrived at the scene, a car bomb detonated, resulting in more casualties. But in the latest major attack, a Taliban assault on a bank in Jalalabad, Nangahar Province, killed 38 people and wounded more than 70 others, officials said; it was the deadliest attack since June 2010.
- Meanwhile, international and local human rights groups have shifted their focus toward condemning abuses committed by the Taliban insurgents, rather than those attributed to the American military and its allies; outraged by growing civilian casualties, many activists are now calling for the insurgents to be investigated for war crimes and viewed as war criminals. Despite this, Fazlullah Wahidi, provincial governor of Kunar Province, alleged US-led NATO forces had killed up to 63 people, including women and children in airstrikes on suspected rebels, and Hamid Karzai, citing information from Afghanistan's spy agency and local officials said "about 50 civilians have been martyred during international military forces operations in Ghaziabad district in Kunar province." Adding that he "strongly condemns" the deaths, Karzai pledged to send investigators to the remote district. NATO said that it would also investigate the allegations and confirmed an ongoing operation in the restive area, but said as many as 36 insurgents had been killed. "We are conducting an immediate assessment of these allegations and will report our findings," a US Army Colonel said in a statement. The U.S. military later denied Afghan government accusations that Gen. David Petraeus, the commander of international forces in Afghanistan, callously dismissed concerns of the airstrike burning children; the accusation, reported by The Washington Post, stemmed from a meeting in Kabul between Afghan officials and the general to discuss the airstrike.
- After returning from an international conference in Munich, President Hamid Karzai accused foreign reconstruction teams of undermining efforts to build up the state's institutions, and said they would have to go as Afghan forces take over security. "Afghanistan clearly explained its viewpoint on Provincial Reconstruction Teams and structures parallel to the Afghan government – private security companies and all activities or bodies which are hindering the Afghan government's development and hindering the governance of Afghanistan," he said. Meanwhile, five rocket-propelled grenades hit a newly built South Korean military base in Parwan Province, northern Afghanistan, which housed hundreds of members of Korea's provincial reconstruction team and civilian aid workers. No one was injured in the attack, but it came hours after a visit by South Korean Defense Minister Kim Kwan-jin, raising suspicions of Taliban involvement. The opening ceremony of the base was postponed indefinitely.
- Afghanistan could face a serious drought in 2011 that would make millions of poor go hungry and fuel instability. Low rainfall early in the wet season will likely threaten Afghanistan's irrigated harvest, U.S. forecasts show, which with a surge in global grain prices could be devastating as the country is already ranked as having the world's worst food security. Drought could be averted if rain and snow fall heavily in coming weeks, however.
- Pakistan said a diplomatic row with Washington over a jailed U.S. citizen should not scuttle talks between Pakistani and Afghan officials on the war in Afghanistan. The U.S. postponed the trilateral meeting, but Pakistan's Foreign Office expressed the hope that "one person would not drive Pakistan-U.S. relations."
- Writing in The New Yorker magazine, Steve Coll reported the Obama administration has opened "direct, secret talks" with senior Taliban leaders who are involved in the insurgency. "The discussions are continuing; they are of an exploratory nature and do not yet amount to a peace negotiation," he wrote, comparing them to secret talks between the US and North Vietnam which started in 1968 but did not result in a peace agreement until 1973. In response, the White House referred to a speech by Secretary of State Hillary Clinton at the Asia Society in which she underscored the need to negotiate even with bitter enemies in order to achieve peace.
- The International Crisis Group concluded in a just-released report that: "The prolonged crisis over Afghanistan’s parliamentary elections has substantially weakened President Hamid Karzai’s government and could, if left unaddressed, drive disenfranchised Afghans into the arms of the Taliban, stoke ethnic tensions and increase the risks of civil war." The group recommended the president and Supreme Court disband the special tribunal that was created to adjudicate elections complaints, and that the newly elected parliament immediately place electoral and constitutional reform at the top of its agenda. And departing UN diplomat Canadian Robert Watkins said security was "at its lowest point since the departure of the Taliban" after the 2001 U.S.-led invasion and the United Nations rarely can enter 40 per cent of the country, including Kandahar and southeast regions where it must negotiate special access from all sides..". On the same day, Afghan Defense Minister Abdul Rahim Wardak appealed for the United States to provide security assistance beyond 2014, telling US Secretary of Defense Robert Gates at the Pentagon: "We do strongly believe that for Afghanistan to be able to survive in that very volatile region, it will need your help beyond 2014.".

== March ==
- A sweep to find weapons' caches and disrupt Taliban preparations for a Spring offensive is conducted by the US 101st Airborne Division in southeast Afghanistan. In a resulting battle which took place the last week of March and first week of April 130 Taliban who resisted the 101st's operation were killed, along with six US soldiers.
- The 2nd Battalion, 327th Infantry Regiment, 101st Airborne Division conducted a major combat operation in Barawala Kalay Valley, Kunar Province, Afghanistan in late March–April 2011. It is known as the Battle of Barawala Kalay Valley. It was an operation to close down the Taliban supply route through the Barawala Kalay Valley and to remove the forces of Taliban warlord Qari Ziaur Rahman from the Barwala Kalay Valley . The 2nd Battalion, 327th Infantry Regiment, 101st Airborne Division would suffer 6 killed and 7 wounded during combat operations. It would inflict over 100 casualties on the Taliban and successfully close down the Taliban supply route. ABC News correspondent Mike Boettcher was on scene and he called it the fiercest fighting he has ever seen in his 30 years of being in war zones.

== April ==
- Three months ahead of the beginning of a July 2011 U.S. troop drawdown in Afghanistan, Secretary of Defense Robert Gates told reporters there has been "some uptick in activity" by Taliban fighters, and that he expected "an increase in the level of violence and activity beginning in a few weeks. ... We're still kind of in the middle of the poppy harvest. ... So I think they're really expecting whatever return to the battlefield there is by the Taliban will be probably sometime more in May – in May and June," he told reporters at the Pentagon. U.S. military officials have said the Taliban's momentum has been reversed, but Gates warned that its fighters "clearly intend to try to take that back.".
- Pakistan's army chief said his forces have "broken the back" of insurgents linked to the Taliban and al-Qaida, following criticism from Washington that Pakistan's security forces are not doing enough to fight militancy. Army General Ashfaq Kayani said "God willing, we will soon prevail." He made the comments in a televised speech at the Pakistan Military Academy north of Islamabad. Kayani said in his address to the military cadets that Pakistan is fully aware of the internal and external threats to the country. Earlier, Admiral Mike Mullen, the chairman of the U.S. Joint Chiefs of Staff, accused Pakistan's intelligence agency of having ties with the Haqqani network, one of the most brutal Taliban groups.
- According to the Long War Journal, on 11 April the Taliban announced the launching of Operation Badr, consisting of planned country-wide attacks using conventional and non-conventional tactics. One portion of the operation including a continuation of efforts to expand the insurgency in northern Afghanistan, including Jawzjan province.

== May ==
- Osama bin Laden is confirmed to have been killed by U.S. forces in Pakistan.
- 16 May, 4 soldiers killed in an IED near Qalati Afghanistan during OEF. Two others wounded
- On 21 May 2011, a suicide bomber detonated a blast at the Daoud Khan Military Hospital in Kabul, killing 6 and injuring 26.
- 28 May 2011: A coalition airstrike in southern Afghanistan killed a dozen children and two women, Afghan and NATO officials said. The death toll, if confirmed, would make it the largest loss of civilian life this year as a result of an ISAF (International Security Assistance Force) airstrike.

== June ==
- Richard Barrett, coordinator of the Al Qaeda and Taliban UN Security Council Sanctions Committee's monitoring team, said that he expected more than 138 Taliban names would be presented to the Security Council on June 16 for a decision on whether they should be removed from the blacklist. Proponents of lifting the sanctions — a major demand of the Taliban for peace talks — say it would boost prospects for reconciliation. Those who are on the list are barred from traveling outside the country, and their bank accounts are supposed to be frozen.
- At least nine people were killed on 28 June when nine heavily armed attackers from the Haqqani network (according to ISAF) stormed the Hotel Inter-Continental Kabul, which is frequented by Westerners and VIPs. Pakistan's intelligence agency ISI has been suspected of having a role in the attack.

== July ==
- On July 12, 2011, operators from the British Special Air Service captured two British-Afghans in a hotel in Herat; they are believed to be the first Britons to be captured alive in Afghanistan since 2001. The couple were known to MI5 but were not considered a priority, they were tracked by MI6 intelligence officers, GCHQ and agents from the NDS, who learned they were trying to "establish contact" with the Taliban or al-Qaeda in order to learn bomb-making skills.
- The World Food Programme estimated 2-3 million drought victims in Afghanistan will need food assistance this year. WFP, which is suffering from a serious shortfall in funding for its regular programs, warned many people will go hungry unless international donors come up with the cash needed to assist them. Poor rainfall this year has hurt Afghanistan's wheat crop—the Afghan Ministry of Agriculture, Irrigation and Livestock estimated the overall harvest will be 28 percent lower than last year's, a shortfall of nearly two million metric tons.
- Gunmen strapped with explosives killed Jan Mohammed Khan, a close adviser and fellow Pashtun to President Hamid Karzai and a member of parliament in another insurgent strike against the Afghan leader's inner circle. His killing, claimed by the Taliban, came less than a week after the assassination of Ahmed Wali Karzai, the president's half brother and one of the most powerful men in southern Afghanistan. The assassination came as international military forces handed over security for Bamiyan province to Afghan security forces, part of a transition process in which seven areas are to be handed over to Karzai's government this month.
- On a day when four NATO troops were killed in bombings in the east and south of Afghanistan, and 11 policemen died in separate attacks, Gen. David Petraeus handed over his duties as commander of U.S. and NATO troops in Afghanistan to U.S. Marine Corps Gen. John R. Allen.
- NATO troops also handed control of Afghanistan's northern capital Mazar-i-Sharif to local forces amid rising security fears just days after it was hit by a deadly bombing. Mazar-i-Sharif is the sixth of seven areas to transition to Afghan control, but critics say the timing is political and there is skepticism over Afghan abilities to combat the Taliban insurgency. Violence is at a record high in the insurgency, and transition comes as 150,000 NATO-led troops begin a gradual withdrawal designed to recall all foreign combat troops by the end of 2014.
- In spite of doubts about capabilities and resolve, foreign troops and Afghan special forces killed more than 50 insurgents during an operation in eastern Paktika province to clear a training camp the Haqqani network used for foreign fighters, NATO said. Disenfranchised insurgents told security forces where the camp was located, the coalition said. And an operation by Afghan and coalition forces in Helmand province left 16 militants dead. According to provincial governor Mohammad Golab Mangal, government and international security forces faced "strong opposition" from the insurgents and confiscated a drug cache that included 2,000 kilograms of poppy, six kilograms of heroin, 50 kilograms of hashish, 150 kilograms of morphine and 20 kilograms of ammonium nitrate, which can be used as an explosive component.

== August ==
- August 6: Chinook shot down by Taliban, resulting in 38 deaths (30 Americans and 8 Afghans), no survivors. The incident caused the death of 30 U.S. Soldiers, seven Afghan troops, and a civilian interpreter. Among the U.S. deaths were 17 Navy Seals who had been part of the Naval Special Warfare Development Group (DEVGRU). It was the same unit who killed Osama Bin Laden, although none of the deceased partook in the operation.

== September ==
- During a five-day mid-month period, a Taliban suicide bomber drove a truck with explosives hidden under firewood into a NATO military base in COP Said Abad, Wardak Province, which left four Afghans dead, two dozen Afghan civilians and 77 Americans wounded;
- On 13 September, an ODA team from 1st Battalion 10th SFG, partnered with Hungarian Special Operations and Afghan National Police, carried out an operation to apprehend known insurgents in Maiden Shahr District, in Wardak Province - an area traditionally used by insurgents to move undetected by opposing coalition forces. The main body of the force patrolled through a village from the north-east, whilst the ODA's team sergeant, MSG Danial Adams, led a small element, which convoyed through the mountainous area on the outskirts of a village via ATVs to provide necessary over watch and to facilitate radio communications from the high ground to the west. After approximately three hours of searching, they were unable to locate their target, so they began to withdraw from the village; it was at that time that they lost their aerial reconnaissance assets, which were pulled away to assist coalition forces in other parts of the country. Once the main body was clear of the village, Adams and the rest of his over-watch element began moving south on their ATVs to the designated link-up point. Adams led the way, followed by SFC Richard Harris and three other team members. Just as they passed a small cluster of buildings at the edge of the village, they ran into a well-planned and emplaced ambush consisting of more than 25 insurgents armed with AK-47's, light machine guns, PKM heavy machine guns, and RPG-7 rocket propelled grenades. The insurgents were in staggered positions along the ambush line across approximately 180 meters. MSG Danial Adams was killed during the initial moments of the ambush whilst attempting to accelerate through the kill zone with his team, SFC Richard Harris spent the rest of the battle aggressively attacking the insurgents whilst guarding the body of his team sergeant at significant risk to his own life; reinforcements were brought into the battle and F-16 strafing runs were carried out, after the dropping of a 500lb bomb, the combined force left the battle. For his actions during the battle, Harris was eventually awarded the Silver Star.
- On 13 September Taliban insurgents attack the US Embassy, ISAF headquarters, and local police stations, among other targets in Kabul, killing at least 11 civilians, 4 police, and 10 insurgents; and Afghan National Army forces captured 2 local rebels, 3 foreign rebels, and seized a barrel of explosives and three mines in Kandahar.
- Chief peace negotiator Burhanuddin Rabbani's killing at his Kabul home by a bomber claiming to be carrying a message of peace from the Taliban leadership triggered fears of dangerous divisions in Afghans fighting the Taliban-led insurgency. "Whoever killed Burhanuddin Rabbani, the intention was to kill any opportunity for peace and stability in Afghanistan," said Abdullah Anas, a former anti-Soviet fighter and Algerian Islamist activist who has worked behind the scenes in recent years to prepare contacts between warring Afghan factions.

== October ==
- October 4 - Afghanistan and India signed a Strategic Partnership Agreement.
- October 15–18 - Open Source Alliance of Central Asia organization is founded in Kabul.
- Afghanistan is appealing for $142 million to feed 2.6 million people this winter as it faces the worst drought for a decade. Agriculture Minister Mohammed Asif Rahimi described the situation as extremely serious, with 14 provinces - about half the country - in the north and east hit by drought; many farmers have sold their livestock and will now depend on food aid to keep alive during winter. An extra 2.6 million hungry people would bring Afghanistan's total to nearly 10 million; the World Food Programme says it is already facing a shortfall in food aid as an earlier appeal was not answered in full.
- In spite of the drought and renewed eradication efforts, opium production surged 61% this year, as rising demand and worsening security helped the reversal of three years of progress in antidrug efforts, the United Nations reported. One year after a blight ravaged the country's opium crops and raised hopes that farmers would turn their backs on opium cultivation, the farm-gate value of this year's harvest more than doubled to $1.4 billion, the U.N. said. The street value, which includes profits made by Taliban intermediaries, heroin refiners and drug cartels, was much higher.
- Marine Gen. John R. Allen told The Associated Press that the "high-intensity, sensitive" operation that began earlier in the month targets the Haqqani network, a Pakistan-based militant network that attacks Afghan and coalition forces. The U.S. has been urging the Pakistanis incessantly to clamp down on Haqqani fighters, who have ties to both the Taliban and al-Qaida and have been blamed for most of the high-profile attacks in the heart of the Afghan capital, Kabul. Allen also told the AP that the process of handing off security to Afghan forces was going to move faster than initially planned (Afghan President Hamid Karzai wants Afghan forces in the lead by the end of 2014).
- U.S. Secretary of State Hillary Clinton warned Pakistani officials that there would be a "very big price" if they failed to take action against militant groups staging attacks inside Afghanistan. Clinton's tone was reinforced by a highly unusual delegation of five top-ranking U.S. officials who traveled to Islamabad to demand aggressive action against the Haqqani network, a Pakistan-based Afghan militant group blamed for the assassinations of Afghan leaders and a high-profile attack last month on the U.S. Embassy in Kabul.
- An Afghan former lawmaker ended a hunger strike of more than two weeks over her removal from office after an appeal from one of the country's most revered elders to call off her protest. Semin Barakzai, the former lawmaker, had vowed to abstain from food and drink until the government investigated vote fraud allegations stemming from the parliamentary elections that took place more than a year ago. Her strike was one in a string of protests, accusations and investigations that have delayed parliament's work and threatened to undermine the legislature's legitimacy.
- At least 12 Americans were killed when a Taliban suicide car bomber attacked an armored shuttle bus in Kabul; the bombing was the single deadliest assault on Americans in the capital since the war began, military officials said. At least four of the dead Americans were G.I.’s and the rest were contract workers; a Canadian soldier and four Afghans were also reported to be killed.
- On 30 October 2011, an ANA soldier opened fire on Australian forces at a patrol base in northern Kandahar Province, shooting 11 people. This attack killed three Australian soldiers and an Afghan Army interpreter and severely wounded seven Australians. The ANA soldier responsible for the attack was killed during the gunfight. It was the bloodiest incident for Australian forces since 2001, and the worst for the ADF since the Vietnam war. The incident raised questions of Australia's commitment to the war in Afghanistan and if success with working alongside the ANA was even possible. The attack weakened trust between Australian and ANA forces and led to weapons being confiscated from some ANA elements for several days. The Australian Prime Minister Julia Gillard later reaffirmed her government's support for Australian involvement. A similar attack occurred just 10 days later on 9 November 2011, when an ANA soldier opened fire wounding three Australians and two Afghan soldiers before escaping.

== November ==
- Afghan lawmakers from Kandahar say their country’s security forces are not yet ready to assume full security responsibilities from NATO in the southern province; they said Kandahar — the birthplace of the Taliban — should be among the last regions handed over by NATO to its Afghan counterparts. Illustrating the point, Taliban fighters set off a car bomb and stormed an area housing U.N. offices in Kandahar city, killing five people, including three U.N. employees.
- Afghanistan's neighbors and regional powers agreed to a "road map" of confidence-building measures, from building road and rail connections to cooperating on border controls, aimed at strengthening the country as U.S. forces withdraw. The declaration, adopted in Istanbul by foreign ministers from 13 countries, was one step in an international effort to build momentum to stabilize Afghanistan and its neighborhood by 2014, when most U.S. troops are expected to have left.
- According to militant commanders, prominent al-Qaida and Afghan Taliban fighters asked Pakistani militants in a pair of rare meetings to set aside differences and step up support for the battle against U.S.-led forces in Afghanistan; the meetings were held in Pakistan's tribal region at the request of the Afghan Taliban's leadership council. This could indicate either the militants are struggling in Afghanistan or that they want to hit U.S. forces hard as the Americans accelerate their withdrawal, giving the Taliban additional leverage in any peace negotiations. "For God’s sake, forget all your differences and give us fighters to boost the battle against America in Afghanistan," senior al-Qaida commander Abu Yahya al-Libi told Pakistani fighters according to a militant who attended.

== December ==
- A series of terrorist attacks in the Afghan cities Kabul, Kandahar and Mazar-i-Sharif killed 60 Shiite worshippers including many children and wounded an estimated 200 on the Day of Ashura on December 6, 2011. The highly coordinated attacks which nearly went off simultaneously were considered to be among the war's deadliest attacks against civilians. Lashkar-i-Jhangvi, a Pakistan-based Deobandi extremist group allied to al-Qaeda, claimed responsibility. Lashkar-i-Jhangvi is known for its systematic attacks against Shiites in Pakistan. According to the Washington Post and New York Times, the Pakistani Inter Services Intelligence (ISI) had ties to Lashkar-i-Jhangvi in the past. The Afghan Taliban, which were allied to Lashkar-i-Jhangvi in their fight against Afghanistan's anti-Taliban United Front in from 1996 to 2001, denied any role in the attacks.
- Canada announced millions of dollars in aid "to almost three million people in 14 northern and north eastern provinces of Afghanistan," International Cooperation Minister Bev Oda said. The aid will buy food rations for 1.2 million people, as well as cash vouchers worth the equivalent of 50 kilograms of wheat flour for six months for 42,000 families in urban areas; millions of Afghans are reportedly facing food shortages after one of the worst droughts to strike the north of Afghanistan in a decade.
- Operators ran the first train down Afghanistan's first major railroad, clearing the way for a long-awaited service from the northern border that should speed up the U.S. military's crucial supply flow and become a hub for future trade; a cargoless train chugged into a newly built station in Mazar-i-Sharif after a 47-mile (75-kilometer) trial run from Hairatan on the border with Uzbekistan, said Deputy Public Works Minister Noor Gul Mangal, who was on hand for the arrival. Afghanistan has never had a functional rail network.
- A suicide bomber blew himself up during a funeral in the town of Taloqan in northern Takhar province, killing 10 people; the attack occurred as mourners were leaving after the end of the funeral. Meanwhile, the Interior Ministry said security forces killed 30 suspected insurgents in a series of clashes around the country; army, police and NATO troops reportedly launched a total of 11 operations in the past 24 hours across the country with seven insurgents arrested.
- President Hamid Karzai said NATO-led night raids and home searches are preventing the country from signing a strategic partnership with the U.S.: "Arbitrary operations and home searches have been a serious problem between NATO and Afghanistan for several years," Karzai reiterated. "This has been one of the main obstacles for signing the Afghanistan-U.S. strategic partnership pact." NATO's International Security Assistance Force expressed support for the nighttime raids as the safest way to target militants across the country. Karzai also said that his government would accept Taliban insurgents' opening a representative office in the Gulf state of Qatar for the purpose of holding peace talks, although Saudi Arabia or Turkey would be preferable venues.
- Afghanistan signed a deal with China National Petroleum Corporation (CNPC) for the development of oil blocks in the Amu Darya basin, a project expected to earn billions of dollars over two decades; the deal covers drilling and a refinery in the northern provinces of Sar-e Pol Province and Faryab Province and is the first international oil production agreement entered into by the Afghan government for several decades.

== Casualties in 2011 ==
- A total of 560 ISAF troops were killed in Afghanistan in 2011, the second highest annual total since the war began in 2001. Four-hundred seventeen were from the US and 45 from the UK.
- The UN Assistance Mission in Afghanistan (UNAMA) documented 3,021 civilian deaths in 2011 compared with 2,790 in 2010 and 2,412 in 2009. Most deaths were caused by insurgents, the report said; this was the fifth year in a row the figure rose.
