= Muhammad Zia =

Muhammad Zia and variants may refer to:

- Muhammad Zia-ul-Haq (1924–1988), sixth president of Pakistan
- Muhammad Zia Hamdard
- Mohammed Zia Salehi, chief of administration for the National Security Council in Afghanistan.
