= 2015 in Afghanistan =

- Decades: 1990s; 2000s; 2010s; 2020s
- See also: Other events of 2015; List of years in Afghanistan

The following events happened in Afghanistan in the year 2015.

== Incumbents ==
- President: Ashraf Ghani
- Chief Executive Officer: Abdullah Abdullah
- Chief Justice: Abdul Salam Azimi

== Events ==
=== January ===
- January 5 – A suicide car bomber targets the headquarters of the European Union Police Mission in Afghanistan in Kabul, killing one person and injuring five. The Taliban claim responsibility.
- January 14 – A U.S. drone strike kills at least two al-Qaeda militants and accidentally kills two hostages: Warren Weinstein and Giovanni Lo Porto.
- January 15 – Afghan security officials arrest five men in Kabul in relation to their suspected involvement in the 2014 Peshawar school massacre in Pakistan.
- January 29 – Taliban insurgency
  - Taliban attacks across Afghanistan kill 17 people.
  - Three American contractors are killed at Hamid Karzai International Airport.

=== February ===
- February 3/4 – Afghan, US and NATO troops carried out a mission in Nangarhar province that captured 6 Taliban militants who were wanted for the 2014 Peshawar school massacre.
- February 9 - A US Air Force drone strike in Helmand Province killed Mullah Abdul Rauf Khadim, deputy commander of ISIL-K, 5 other militants were killed in the strike.
- February 25 – At least 187 people are killed in avalanches in northeastern Afghanistan.
- February 26 – A Taliban suicide bomb attack on a Turkish government vehicle in Kabul kills at least one person.

=== March ===
- March 24 - During a visit to the US by Ghani and Abdullah, the US president announced that the US forces will remain at a level of about 9800 troops through 2015 and will not be drawn down to 5000 as had been originally planned.
- March 25 – The Afghan National Army kills twenty-nine insurgents and injures twenty-one others in a series of operations in Daikundi, Ghazni, and Parwan provinces.

=== April ===
- April 18 - A major suicide bomb attack in Jalalabad killed more than 30 people and injured over 100 persons. A spokesman for the ISIL said it carried out the attack.
- April 24 - The Battle of Kunduz begins.

=== May ===
- Suicide bombers attack the Park Palace guesthouse on 13 May 2015. Norwegian special forces from the Marinejegerkommandoen were central in saving 37 Australian hostages while they were in direct contact with the Australian ambassador in Kabul.
- Late May - Secret talks were held in the Chinese city of Urumqi between Afghanistan's peace envoy and representatives of the Taliban. The meeting was reportedly facilitated by Pakistan's intelligence agency ISI.

=== June ===
- 2015 Kabul Parliament attack - the Taliban use a car bomb, assault rifles and RPGs to attack the parliament, killing a woman and injuring 30 civilians.

=== July ===
- July 7 - The third senior group commander of ISIL in Afghanistan; Shahidullah Shahid, was killed along with five other terrorists in a U.S. drone strike in Nangarhar province.
- July 13 - At least 33 people have been killed in a suicide car bomb attack near Camp Chapman housing both Afghan and international troops in Khost province.
- July 20 - Eight Afghan soldiers were killed and five wounded by friendly fire from a U.S. Apache helicopter in Logar province, south of Kabul during a battle with insurgents.

=== August ===
- August 7 - A series of bombings in Kabul kill 50 and wound 500. The attacks were claimed by the Taliban.
- August 10 - A Taliban suicide bomber attacked a checkpoint near the entrance to the international airport in Kabul, killing five people.
- August 22 - A Suicide attack on a NATO convoy in Kabul kills 12 and injures 66.
- August 26 - Two NATO soldiers were killed in an 'insider attack'in Helmand province.

=== October ===
- October 1 to 4 - U.S. aircraft launched 22 airstrikes over four days on Taliban targets in Kunduz.
- October 2 - A U.S. C-130 aircraft crashed at Jalalabad airport in a non-hostile incident, killing 12.
- October 3 - A USAF AC-130U gunship attacked the Kunduz Trauma Centre operated by Médecins Sans Frontières (MSF) during the Battle of Kunduz, killing at least 30 people and injuring over 30.
- October 10 - An RAF Puma Mk2 helicopter crashed as it was landing at NATO training and support mission HQ in Kabul, killing five NATO personnel.
- October 7 to 11 - In Shorabak district, Kandahar province, 200 U.S. and Afghan Special forces operators supported by 63 U.S. airstrikes destroyed 'probably the largest ever' AQIS training camp, killing Some 160 al-Qaeda terrorists. Also that day, the Taliban attacked a British military convoy in Kabul, there were no British casualties however seven Afghans were injured.
- October 13 - A U.S. F-16 was struck by insurgent small arms fire whilst flying over Paktia province, forcing it to return to base.
- October 14 - U.S. and Afghan forces retake the city of Kunduz after the Taliban withdraws from the city.
- October 15 - President Obama announces that he will be keeping 9,800 troops in Afghanistan through most of 2016 and 5,500 into 2017, rather than reducing the force to about 1,000 service members by the end of 2016.
- October 20 - The Taliban seize Babaji in Helmand province.
- October 26 - The 2015 Hindu Kush earthquake of 7.5 magnitude hits north-east Afghanistan, with tremors reported in India and Pakistan, with at least 260 killed.

=== November ===
- Unknown - The Taliban had surrounded police forces in the center of Marja District, threatening to take over that town and open the way for an assault on the provincial capital. But in a rescue mission by eight United States Special Operations soldiers leading a contingent of Afghan soldiers, kept the district in government control
- Unknown - A company of US Army Rangers and Afghan counter-terrorism forces, destroyed an al-Qaeda training camp in a “fierce fight” that lasted for several days in southeastern Afghanistan.
- November 25 - The Afghan army launched an operation to rescue hostages captured by the Taliban after their helicopter was shot down in Pashtun Kot district, Faryab province the previous day. Of the 21 people on board, three were killed the Taliban.

=== December ===
- Early December - NATO forces had carried out heavy airstrikes in several districts of Helmand, including Marja, Sangin and Babaji. In another joint operation, in Nawzad, NATO and Afghan forces conducted a rescue operation in which they freed 62 hostages of the Taliban, including police officers and civilians.
- December 5 - Throughout the night, a group of Rangers engaged in a firefight with enemy troops near the Afghan-Pakistan border; after about 5 a.m. their commander called for an extraction after they learned of a larger enemy group approaching. A helicopter from the 160th SOAR arrived and began and received heavy fire from the enemy, an AH-64 Apache helicopter from the 1st Battalion 101st Aviation Regiment escorting the helicopter, put their Apache directly between the U.S. troops, the helicopter and the enemy forces to draw the fire. As a result, the extraction was a success.
- December 8 - The Taliban attack Kandahar Airport, killing 37 people including nine Taliban insurgents and 35 people were injured as well as one insurgent
- December 11 - Taliban militants attack the Spanish embassy in Kabul killing a total of nine people and perpetrators.
- December 17 - Green Berets from A Company, 1st Battalion, 19th Special Forces Group were accompanying a team of Afghan commandos in a clearing operation in Khan Neshin Valley in Helmand province; a firefight broke out whilst they were clearing several structures resulting in two Afghans killed and two Americans were wounded, at least five enemy combatants were killed, one green beret was awarded the Silver star for his actions in the engagement.
- December 21 - The Taliban carried out a suicide attack on a joint NATO and Afghan patrol near the Kandahar air base killing six US airmen.
- December 25 - Ashraf Ghani & Narendra Modi, inaugurate new Parliament building of Afghanistan And an earthquake hits Northern Afghanistan.
