= 2016 in Afghanistan =

- Decades: 1990s; 2000s; 2010s; 2020s
- See also: Other events of 2016; List of years in Afghanistan

The following lists events that happened during 2016 in Afghanistan.

== Incumbents ==
- President: Ashraf Ghani, 2014-current
- Chief Executive Officer: Abdullah Abdullah, 2014–current
- Chief Justice: Abdul Salam Azimi

== Events ==
=== January ===
- January 1 - A suicide car bomb blast struck a Kabul restaurant, killing two and injuring 15.
- January 2 - Afghan security forces battled a group of gunmen near the Indian consulate in Mazar-i-Sharif. Also that day, an Afghan counterterrorism force freed 59 prisoners from a Taliban prison in the district of Nahr-i-Sarraj.
- January 5 - A United States Army Special Forces soldier from A Company, 1st Battalion 19th SFG was killed and two others were wounded as were an unknown number of Afghan special forces soldiers during a joint operation in support of a larger mission by the Afghan National Army's 215th Corps in clearing Taliban compounds in the town of Marja, Helmand Province. An Army HH-60 special operations helicopter was also damaged.
- January 13 - Militants affiliated with the ISIS–K attacked Pakistan's consulate in Jalalabad, Afghanistan, killing 9 people and injuring 12 more. A suicide bomber had tried to join a queue of people seeking visas to Pakistan and blew himself up after being prevented from entering the building.
- January 16 - Two Rangers from 2nd Battalion, 75th Ranger Regiment were wounded in an attack during a joint Ranger-Afghan special operation forces mission in Paktika province.

=== February ===
- February 1 - A suicide bomber blew himself up while standing in a queue at the entrance of the headquarters of the Afghan National Civil Order Police in Kabul. The blast killed at least 20 people and another 29 were injured. The Taliban claimed responsibility. Also that day, U.S. airstrikes in Nangarhar province, eastern Afghanistan, killing 29 ISIS fighters and struck the terrorist group's FM radio station.
- February 2 - A U.S. airstrike in Paktika province, eastern Afghanistan, killed 18 Taliban fighters from Pakistan.
- February 5 - Afghan forces suffered four KIA and seven WIA in Sangin, Helmand province.
- February 6 - Afghan soldiers defending the government buildings In Sangin, suffered nine KIA, seven WIA, and three POW following a Taliban attack.
- February 11 - An Afghan policeman shot dead four colleagues and injured seven more in Kandahar Province.
- February 14 - The Nangarhar Offensive began.
- February 17 - Men who appeared to be from the Afghan army raided a health clinic belonging to the Swedish Committee for Afghanistan (SCA) in Tangi Saidan in Wardak Province, killing 4.
- February 20 - A U.S. Air Force MQ-9 Reaper crashed at Kandahar airfield.
- February 22 - Afghan forces and U.S.-led coalition airstrikes kill a total 43 Islamic State militants in Nangarhar Province during a military operation against ISIS in that region.
- February 26 - Afghan special forces raided a Taliban prison in an area between Nad Ali and Marjah districts Helmand province and liberated 35 people and capturing seven Taliban militants.
- February 27 - 25 people were killed in Taliban suicide attacks in Kabul and Asadabad, Kunar province.

=== March ===
- March 2 - Militants attacked the Indian consulate in Jalalabad, five militants were killed and nine people were injured.
- March 6 - The Nangarhar Offensive ended; Afghanistan's President Ashraf Ghani announced in the Afghan parliament that the Islamic State has been defeated in the eastern parts of the country. Also that day, a U.S. drone strike in Nangarhar killed 15 ISIL militants.
- March 9 - As many as 10 Taliban insurgents attacked Afghan government buildings in Helmand Province.
- March 14 - Khanneshin district fell to the Taliban.
- March 16 - Militants loyal to ISIS-K attacked an Afghan police checkpoint in Nangarhar province, killing and wounding six policemen.
- March 29 - A USAF F-16 crashed on takeoff near Bagram Air Field.
- March 30 - Taliban militants blocked the highway between Dihrawud and Tarin Kot, Uruzgan province Afghan forces cleared them from the highway after four days of fighting, afghan forces suffered 15 killed and 8 wounded. Around 100 Taliban insurgents, including foreign fighters, attacked police check points – in particular they clashed with the Taliban in Charhar Bolak district Balkh province which resulting in two police officers dead and eight insurgents dead. The Taliban were pushed back after reinforcements arrived and fighting continued in Jawzjan province.

=== April ===
- Early April - A mission lasting 36-hours took place in the Kot district in Nangarhar province involving unilateral U.S. strikes against ISIL targets which enabled Afghan special operations forces to move into the district and clear part of a valley.
- April 6–39 IS militants are killed, including their Commander Qari Yusif, and 15 others are wounded in clashes with Afghan forces in Nangarhar province.
- April 15 - Afghan and U.S. forces carried out a raid on the house of Abu Abdullah; a suspected al Qaeda member in Kharwar district, Logar province. Two people were seized along with weapons and intelligence, 12 people (seven of them were ethnic Chechens), including three children, were killed.
- April 19 - As part of the Taliban spring offensive; the Taliban and the Haqqani network carried out attacks on Kabul killing 71 and wounding more than 367.
- For that month, the U.S., Afghan and other allied special operations forces carried out just under 19 counterterrorism strikes on ISIL targets and a few on al-Qaeda targets.

=== May ===
- May 5 - Afghan special forces, with NATO forces in support, liberated over 60 people held in a Taliban jail in Nawzad district, killing 2 militants and capturing many more.
- May 7 - 2 Romanian special forces operatives were killed by 2 Taliban members/supporters in an "insider attack" in Kandahar.
- May 8 - The Afghan government executed six Taliban prisoners for perpetrating serious crimes against civilians and security forces and after demands from victims families. Also that day, two buses and a fuel tanker collided on a major highway in Ghazni province, killing 73 people and more than 50 other people injured. Also that day, Taliban fighters attacked police checkpoints on the outskirts of Lashkar Gah, killing 15 security officers, but police said 14 fighters were killed before the group was driven off, this assault brought an end to the lull in fighting during the annual opium harvest in Helmand province.
- May 9 - A U.S. drone strike killed 12 Taliban fighters, including a senior commander, in Chahar Dara district, Kunduz province.
- May 10 - A joint Afghan-US special forces rescued Ali Haider Gilani; the son of a former Pakistani prime minister Yusuf Raza Gilani, in Ghazni province, he had been kidnapped 3 years before and was being held by an al-Qaeda affiliated group. Other reports state the raid took place in Patika province, additionally; 4 enemy combatants were killed. Also that day, contact with a U.S. unmanned aircraft over Nangahar province was lost, the Taliban claims that they shot it down.
- May 14 - At least four people are killed and 12 injured after a suicide bomb attack on an Afghan National Police training center in Helmand Province.
- May 17 - A U.S. airstrike/drone strike killed a senior Al Qaeda leader in the Shah Joyi district, Zabul province.
- May 21 - A Taliban suicide bomber attacked a NATO convoy in Nasro, Parwan province; wounding 2 civilians. Also that day, in the Uruzgan province, 6 Afghan policemen were killed in an insider attack by 3 Taliban fighters.
- May 26 - U.S. Army Special forces supported some 80 soldiers of the Afghan 3rd Special Operations Battalion whose mission was to clear insurgents out of Elbak, Kandahar province which would clear the road from Kandahar, through Elbak to Tarin Kowt so an 800-man Afghan army convoy could deliver troops and supplies to Tarin Kowt. U.S. aircraft spotted Taliban fighters close to where the U.S. helicopters were going to land the commandos; the Green Berets won permission for 3 airstrikes which was carried out by U.S. drones, killing seven and wounding others. The mission had mixed results; the Taliban reoccupied the area and the convoy barely made any progress, however, the operation had interrupted the Taliban's nightly routine of bomb-planting. A week later, U.S. helicopters again dropped Afghan commandos into Elbak and this time they stayed for more than a day whilst police cleared some 18 booby-trap bombs from the road and slowly, the relief convoy began to make its way north.
- May 31 - The beginning of the Kunduz-Takhar highway hostage crisis, where hundreds of civilians were kidnapped, with many casualties.

=== June ===
- June 12 - A clash occurred between Pakistani and Afghan soldiers at the main border crossing at the end of the Khyber Pass and continued into the night, leaving one Pakistani soldier wounded, while on the Afghan side one soldier was killed and six have been injured.
- June 14 - Taliban fighters overran much of Charchino district in Uruzgan province after several days of fighting in which a "handful” of international advisors and Special Operations forces provided support to government forces. 77 Taliban fighters were killed and another 36 wounded, while 12 Afghan security forces members were killed and five wounded.
- June 18–27 Islamic State loyalists were killed in a drone strike in different areas of Achin district, Nangarhar province.
- June 20 - At least 14 Nepalese security guards were killed by a Taliban suicide bomber in Kabul, nine people were also wounded; separately ten civilians died in an explosion at a market in northeastern Badakhshan province, ten civilians were killed and 40 others wounded when a bomb attached to a motorcycle exploded in a crowded market in Badakhshan province's Keshm district. See the Kabul attack on Canadian Embassy Guards
- June 26 - An airstrike killed Qari Ghafour, a senior Taliban commander in Char Dara District; another top Taliban commander in Faryab province surrendered to government forces amid ongoing military operations there.

=== July ===
- July 2 - 225 Islamic State loyalist were killed during military operations launched nearly a week ago, local officials said.
- July 9 - A U.S. drone strike in Nangarhar province targeting ISIL-K members killed Umar Khalifa, the leader of the Tariq Gidar Group and four other enemy combatants.
- July 13 - Three counterterrorism strikes were conducted Achin district, Nangarhar province.
- July 14 - A U.S. drone destroyed ISIS a radio station in Nangarhar province.
- July 23 - a twin bombing occurred in the vicinity of Deh Mazang square in Kabul, capital of Afghanistan, when the #Enlightenment_Movement protesters, mostly from the Hazara ethnic, were marching against a decision to bypass their region in the development of the TUTAP mega power project. At least 97 people were killed and 260 injured. The terrorist group Islamic State of Iraq and the Levant has claimed responsibility, however, the same group later on refused it. Following the Kabul bombing, Afghan and U.S. forces began operations to clear IS militants out of eastern Afghanistan.
- July 24 - A U.S. special operations soldier was wounded in southern Nangarhar province.
- July 25 - Four U.S. special operations troops were wounded in southern Nangarhar province.
- July 26 - A U.S. drone strike in Achin district, Nangarhar province, killed ISIS-K top leader in Afghanistan: Hafiz Sayed Khan, the airstrike was part of a month-long operation against ISIS carried out by U.S. and Afghan special operations forces in southern Nangarhar province.

=== August ===
- August 1 - Kabul attack kills one and injures four.
- August 4 - Taliban militants attacked a convoy of foreign tourists in Chishti Sharif District, Herat Province, wounding several of them.
- August 7 - Three U.S. soldiers were minorly wounded in a vehicle suicide bombing Surkh-Rōd District near Jalalabad. Also that day, an American and Australian professor working at the American University of Afghanistan in Kabul, were kidnapped.
- August 12 - A U.S. Soldier 1st Battalion, 12th Infantry Regiment, 2nd Brigade Combat Team, 4th Infantry Division died from a noncombat-related injury in Kandahar. Also that day, Taliban fighters launched a coordinated attack on Dahana-e-Ghori, Baghlan Province.
- August 15 - Two people were wounded in a bombing outside the U.S. Embassy in Kabul. Also that day, Taliban fighters took control of Dahana i Ghuri District after dozens of Afghan forces made "a tactical retreat".
- August 20 - Afghan government forces were briefly pushed out of the nearby Khanabad district, Helmand Province.
- August 21 - After days of heavy fighting, the Taliban took control of Khanabad District, Kunduz Province, Afghan forces later retook the district.
- August 22 - U.S. attack helicopters assisted Afghan forces fighting in Ali Abad District.
- August 23 - A US soldier from A Company, 3rd battalion, 1st SFG, was killed by an IED whilst another was wounded along with 6 Afghans during a foot patrol near Lashkar Gah.
- August 24 - Suspected members of the Taliban or ISIS carried out the American University of Afghanistan attack killing over a dozen and injuring more than 50.

=== September ===
- September 5/6 - The Kabul attacks kill over 40 and injure over 100 people.
- September 8 - The Taliban pushed into Tarinkot, but within hours the Afghan Ministry of Defence said the Taliban had been repelled from the city.
- mid-September - According to an al-Qaeda announcement, US forces “in a ground raid based on information provided by Pakistani military" killed Usama Ibrahim in Zabul province. Ibrahim (also known as Amjad Bhai) was a Pakistani jihadist who was a member of AQIS’ top leadership body, the “head of Al Sahab Media,” al Qaeda's official media production arm.
- September 18 - A misdirected American airstrike killed at least seven Afghan police officers in Urozgan Province.
- September 28 - A suspected U.S. drone strike in Nangarhar province killed 18 people (15 militants and three civilians).

=== October ===
- October 2/3 - Taliban insurgents launched a coordinated assault from four directions on the city of Kunduz on the evening of October 2, entering deep into the city. U.S. special operations forces arrived on October 2 to support Afghan forces, whilst the Afghan air force conducted multiple airstrikes in support of Afghan ground forces. Brigadier General Dawlat Waziri, a spokesman for the Afghan Defence Ministry said that “Defence and security forces with the support of air forces have responded to their attacks and right now the situation is totally under their control."
- October 4 - A US soldier from B Company, 2nd Battalion, 10th SFG was killed by a roadside bomb blast in Achin, Nangarhar province, he was on a patrol with Afghan forces during an operation against ISIL-K militants. This marked the first time a U.S. serviceman was killed in combat against IS militants in the country.
- October 8 - Two US serviceman were wounded in Chapahar district, Nangarhar province, when their vehicle they were traveling triggered an IED, they were conducting a routine security patrol in the vicinity of Jalalabad Airfield.
- October 9 - An Afghan army helicopter crashed in Dand Ghori district, Baghlan province killing eight Afghan Army soldiers. The helicopter crashed due to a technical problem whilst supplying a military base.
- October 10 - A suicide car bombing killed 14 people, including 10 Afghan police officers in Lashkar Gah, Helmand province. Also that day, Afghan security forces continued to battle the Taliban to push them from the city of Kunduz and insurgents surrounded outposts manned by Afghan forces in Farah province.
- October 11 - A gunman killed 14 people and wounded dozens more at a shrine in Kabul, Afghan police killed the gunman.
- October 12 - A bomb explosion among crowds of Shiite Muslims gathered to mark Ashura in Mazar-e Sharif, kills at least 12 people and wounds 28 others.
- October 14 - The Resolute Support mission announced that it was sending Western advisers to Farah province, roughly a week after Taliban fighters began making concerted efforts to seize Farah city.
- October 17 - DEA agents, supported by a US Army Green Beret A-team and Afghan counternarcotic units conducted a warranted search in a remote village in Farah province. After a brief gunfight with insurgents near the compound outside the remote village, they discovered a "superlab" belonging to the Hadimama drug trafficking network that was led by two suspected Taliban commander and facilitators. The team seized 20 tons of drugs (12.5 tons of morphine base, 6.4 tons of heroin base, 134 kilograms of opium, 129 kilograms of crystal heroin and 12 kilograms of hashish), they also seized nine motorcycles and five AK-47 rifles. It was reported that the superlab was apparently a first of its kind seen by DEA agents in Afghanistan; officials said it was the "largest known seizure of heroin in Afghanistan, if not the world."
- October 19 - A U.S. soldier from Support Squadron, 3rd Cavalry Regiment, 1st Cavalry Division and an Army civilian employee were killed at a military base in Kabul by a gunman in Afghan army uniform. Two civilians and a service member were also wounded in the attack.
- October 23 - 2 Al-Qaeda leaders in Afghanistan (Farouq al-Qahtani, Al-Qaeda's emir for northeastern Afghanistan and his deputy Bilal al-Utabi) were killed in a US drone strike in Kunar province. They were hiding in two different compounds in Hilgal, Ghazi Abad district; the provincial spokesman said that at least 15 insurgents were killed (including two Arabs and a number of Pakistani Taliban fighters).
- October 25–30 People were kidnapped in the mountains north of Firoz Koh, Ghor province by IS militants, Afghan security forces tried to free the civilians, killing an IS commander in the process, however the militants killed all 30 civilians.
- October 26 - At least 33 Islamic State militants have been killed in Pachir Aw Agam District, Nangarhar Province, an official said. Five hideouts and a machinegun were also destroyed by security forces.
- October 29 - At least 19 Lashkar-e-Taiba militants were killed and eight others wounded in the airstrikes in Dangam District, Kunar Province. Officials further added that over 100 LeT militants were deployed in Nuristan province in an attempt to set up training camps in Kamdesh District. Also on the same day, thirty Taliban rebels including a notorious commander have been killed as a result of air and ground operation in central Uruzgan province. Hajji Mohammad a.k.a. Haji Lala, Taliban shadow district chief for Chinarto District, was among the dead.

=== November ===
- November 3 - In the early hours, a joint raid with Afghan and NATO troops that targeted top Taliban commanders took place in Kunduz Province. After they were surrounded and came under enemy fire, the Afghans requested foreign airstrikes - despite Afghan forces providing initial air support, U.S. aircraft carried out the airstrikes. Two US soldiers from 2nd Battalion, 10th SFG were killed and four others wounded and 4 Afghan special forces troops were also killed and seven were wounded. A Kunduz provincial police spokesman said that as of Friday morning (November 4), there were 24 civilian fatalities, including women and children, as many as 10 others were injured during the operation, which occurred in the village of Buze Kandahari, a Taliban-dominated area. A Kunduz police chief said the two senior Taliban commanders who were the target of the raid were killed in the fighting along with 63 other insurgents.
- November 10 - A Taliban suicide bomber using a car packed with explosives, exploded at the German consulate in Mazar-i-Sharif, killing at least four civilians and wounded 128 others, following this, heavily armed Taliban attacked the consulate.
- November 12 - A suicide bomber killed two (a third died from wounds on December 3) US Soldiers from HHC, 1st Special Troops Battalion, 1st Sustainment Brigade, 1st Cavalry Division at the Bagram airbase, two American contractors were also killed in the blast and 16 other U.S. service members and a Polish service member were wounded. The bomber was a former Taliban militant.
- November 21 - IS militants carried out a suicide attack on Baqir ul-Uloom mosque in Kabul, that was crowded with Shias - more than 30 people were killed and dozens wounded.

=== December ===
- December 18 - At least 14 people were killed after a bus collided with a fuel tanker on a motorway in Farah province.
- December 21/22 - 3 Taliban gunmen attacked the home of the MP for Helmand Province, Mir Wali. Eight people were killed and six others were wounded, Security forces killed the gunmen and freed 18 hostages after a 10-hour siege.
- December 31 - United States troops withdraw from Afghanistan after 15 years.

== See also ==
- Timeline of Afghan history
