= 2014 Afghanistan protests =

Political protests in Afghanistan

The 2014 Afghanistan protests was a series of pro-government and anti-electoral fraud protests by hundreds, then tens of thousands of demonstrators from 21–27 June, during the 2014 Afghan presidential election campaigns was taking place. Mass protests and Civil disobedience has rocked areas across Afghanistan in June, demanding free elections in support of the Democracy. Protesters rallied against blasphemy laws in October 2014, and a wave of protests also hit Afghanistan in March 2015. Protesters also protested against fraud and electoral suffrage and mistrust, rallying in support of main candidate Abdullah Abdullah and chanted slogans on 27 June. Protests did remain largely bloodless and led to no police intervention however.

== See also ==
- 2019-2020 Afghanistan protests
