= Sitara Achakzai =

Afghan women's rights activist

- Born: 1956
- Died: 12 April 2009 (aged 51–52); Kandahar, Kandahar, Islamic Republic of Afghanistan
- Cause of death: Assassination
- Citizenship: Afghanistan; Germany
- Occupation: Activist

Sitara Achakzai (also transliterated Achaksai، Pashto: ستاره اچکزۍ) (1956/1957 – 12 April 2009) was a leading Afghan women's rights activist and a member of the regional parliament in Kandahar. She was assassinated by the Taliban.

Achakzai is a name shared by one of the sub-tribes of Durrani clan, part of the Pashtun people, one of the largest ethnic groups of Afghanistan. She held dual citizenship of Afghanistan and Germany, and was well known in Canada as some of her extended family live in the Toronto area.

== Death ==
Like Malalai Kakar and Safia Amajan, Sitara Achakzai was targeted by the Taliban because she was trying to improve the situation of Afghan women. At the age of 52, she was assassinated by Taliban gunmen in Kandahar on 12 April 2009.

The Canadian government condemned the assassination. Michaëlle Jean and the Governor General, said

We were equally distressed to learn of the assassination of Sitara Achakzai, a courageous and proud activist for the rights of her countrywomen, who was gunned down at point-blank range. The Taliban were quick to claim responsibility for this unprecedented violence, fiercely dedicated to hindering all efforts to further development and stability in Afghanistan.

== Encomium ==
- "She was a warrior, she was a brave woman and she always fought for women's rights and the poor's rights; that's why they didn't like her ... [I]t's a loss for everybody; for democracy, basically, because she fought for everybody." (Ajmal Maiwand, nephew of Ms. Achakzai)
