= Catherine Bragg =

Canadian civil servant

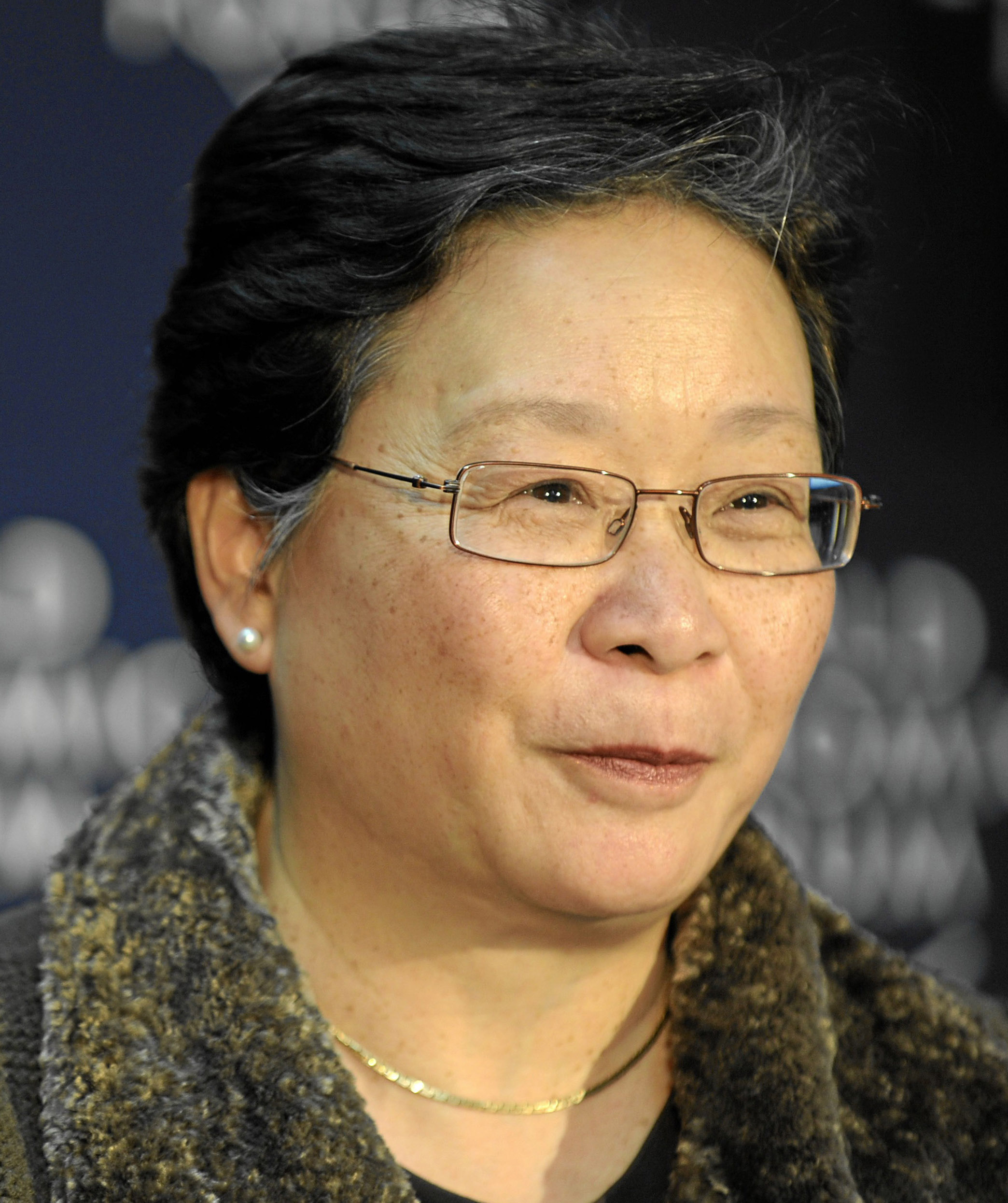
Catherine Bragg at the World Economic Forum Annual Meeting 2010.

Catherine Bragg (born in 1953) served as United Nations Deputy Emergency Relief Coordinator in the Office for the Coordination of Humanitarian Affairs between February 2008 and March 2013. Bragg obtained a PhD in Criminal Justice from the University at Albany, SUNY, a Master of Philosophy in Criminology from the University of Cambridge and a Bachelor of Science in Psychology from the University of Toronto.

Throughout her career, she has served in various capacities in the Federal Public Service in the Government of Canada, including in the Privy Council Office, the Department of National Defence and the Department of Justice.

Prior to joining the United Nations, Bragg served as the Director-General of the Humanitarian Assistance, Peace and Security Programme in the Canadian International Development Agency (CIDA) since 2004.

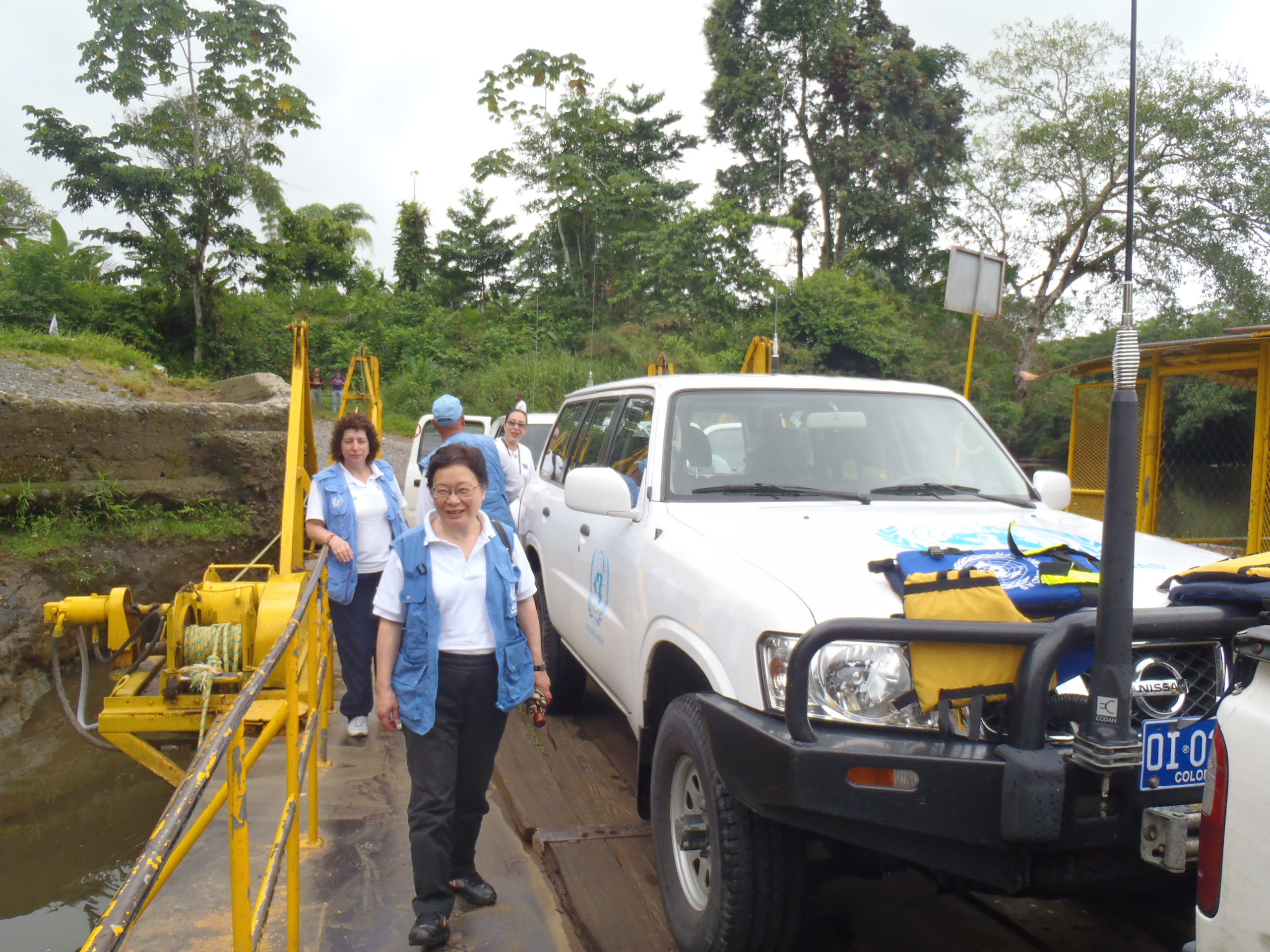
Catherine Bragg mission in Tumaco/Nariño/Colombia 2011

Since her retirement from public service in 2013, she has been appointed Adjunct Full Professor at the Centre for Humanitarian Action in University College Dublin, and serves as a Governor of the University of Toronto since 2016.
