= Murder of Mohebullah =

2010 shooting in Afghanistan

The murder of Mohebullah refers to the 2010 shooting of prisoner Mohebullah in Afghanistan by a US soldier who later pleaded guilty and was convicted by a U.S. military judge.

On October 17, 2010 "in a jail cell at a U.S. outpost in Afghanistan" prisoner Muhebullah was shot to death after Private First Class David Lawrence had unlocked the door and entered the prison cell of Mohebullah. The prisoner was "described by Army officials as a suspected Taliban commander" according to the website of Fox News.

PFC Lawrence pled guilty and on May 25, 2011 a U.S. military court at Fort Carson sentenced him to 12 and a half years for the premeditated murder of Mohebullah. He was incarcerated at Fort Leavenworth in Kansas.
