= Sahar Gul =

Afghan teenager

Sahar Gul (born 17 June 1998) is an Afghan woman who was subjected to torture and abuse by her husband's family in the town of Puli Khumri when she was illegally married as a child bride. Her case became notable in Afghanistan and internationally when she was rescued in late 2011. The Guardian said that the case of Gul "horrified Afghanistan and prompted a bout of national soul-searching". Three of her in-laws were found guilty of attempted murder and sentenced to 10 years in prison, but later freed after an appeals court voided their convictions. American Attorney Kimberley Motley represented Gul in Supreme Court upon hearing of the in-laws release. Gul became the first victim of a crime that was represented by an Attorney for a criminal proceeding. In a landmark decision the Supreme Court, and after the case was decided twice by the Appellate Court, Gul's in-laws, brother and husband who were never originally tried were convicted and sentenced to five years in prison. The court also agreed that Gul could sue all parties for civil compensation. Gul is recovering in a women's shelter and says that she has ambitions to become a politician and stop other women suffering as she did.

== Early life ==
Gul grew up in Badakhshan, a mountainous province in Northern Afghanistan. Following the death of her father she was moved around relatives and eventually lived with her stepbrother when she was aged about 9. Gul would tend cows and sheep and work in an orchard of walnut and apricot trees, and also made dung bricks for fuel. Her presence in her stepbrother's house was apparently resented by his wife, who pressured him to give Gul up for marriage even though she had not reached the legal marriage age of 16. Her stepbrother's wife had been contacted by a 30-year-old man, Ghulam Sakhi, who illegally paid at least $5,000 for her. Gul was illiterate at the time of her marriage.

== Marriage and abuse ==
Sakhi took Gul to his parents' home in the northern province of Baghlan. Officials from the Afghan Ministry of Women's Affairs claimed that Sakhi's family intended to force Gul into prostitution. Sakhi's first wife had left him after he and his mother had beaten her for not bearing him children. Gul resisted consummating her marriage for weeks.

Gul ran away to a neighbour's house, they alerted the police and Sakhi's family. Sakhi was forced by his neighbours and the police to sign a letter promising not to mistreat Gul in the future, and she was taken back by Sakhi. A neighbour later heard screams coming from the house, and the following morning Gul was described as having "...lost a lot of weight, her hands were covered with bruises and wounds, one of her hands was broken, but her mother-in-law was forcing her to do the laundry”. Sakhi's family later put her in the cellar. In the cellar, her hands and feet were tied with rope, she slept on the floor without a mattress, and was fed bread and water. She was beaten regularly, with most of the beatings coming from the elderly father of her husband. Her nails and clumps of her hair had been pulled out, and chunks of her flesh had been cut out with pliers. She was lying in hay and animal dung at the time of her discovery.

His father was accused of hitting Gul with "sticks, biting her chest, inserting hot irons in her ears and vagina, and pulling out two fingernails". Gul's uncle and stepbrother unsuccessfully attempted to visit her, and her stepbrother, Mohammed was warned by Sakhi's family over the legality of the marriage.

== Discovery ==
In December 2011, six months after the marriage, Gul was discovered by her uncle and stepbrother and two police officers after they called at the house and heard a voice from the cellar. Police arrested three members of Sakhi's family; Gul's mother-in-law, Siyamoi, her daughter Mahkhurd and Amanullah, the father-in-law. Amanullah was found hiding in a burqa and a blanket.

Police were told by the family that Sakhi was in Helmand, in the Afghan National Army. This was untrue, and the confusion caused by the false claim allowed him time to escape with his brother, Darmak. They remain at large. A special police unit was established to look for Sakhi.

The President of Afghanistan, Hamid Karzai, called for swift justice for Gul. In May 2012, the judge of a district court in Kabul declared Gul's three in-laws guilty, with the judgement broadcast on national television. In court the in-laws justified their behaviour as a result of their paying good money for a girl who was not pretty, who misbehaved and who would neither work as they demanded nor bear them children.

The in-laws' lawyers were provided by the legal group Da Qanoon Ghushtonky (Demanders of Law), a group financed by international aid. The lawyers argue that due process in Gul's case was negatively affected by the political outcry over her treatment. The lawyers for the in-laws said they denied beating or drugging Gul and confining her in the cellar, and claimed that Gul's wounds were self-inflicted. They also said they had no plans to send her into prostitution, a claim not addressed in the court.

== Conviction and appeal ==
Three people, Gul's mother-in-law, father-in-law, and sister-in-law were subsequently convicted for her attempted murder, and sentenced to 10 years in prison in July 2012. Their convictions were later upheld on appeal.

In July 2013 Gul's in-laws were released early and their convictions quashed due to a lack of evidence. Gul and her lawyer were not informed of the release of her in-laws and only found out of their release when they enquired after the date for their appeal. Gul's lawyer, Motley said the release was "...based on the idea that there was no evidence, but the people who would have given evidence didn't know that the hearing was taking place". The Afghan Supreme Court sent Gul's case back to an appeals court, the supreme court said that the violence suffered by Gul appeared to warrant convictions for assault, not attempted murder. Their decision was shared by the appeals court who voided the convictions and ordered that the three in-laws be freed. In a landmark decision, the Supreme Court heard the case after the Appellate Court heard the case twice and ruled that Gul's in-laws, brother and husband who were never originally tried were convicted and sentenced to five years in prison. The court also agreed that Gul could sue all parties for civil compensation.

The government prosecutor was not present, and the only person in court was the defence lawyer for the accused, even though both are required to be informed under Afghan law. The defendants were released from prison two days later, a process that usually takes up to a month. The process would have involved government prosecutors twice declining to appeal the release of Gul's in-laws, with the involvement of at least three judges and a prosecutor.

An internet cafe for women was opened in the Afghan capital Kabul on international Women's Day in 2012, and named after Gul. Gul lives in a shelter near Kabul run by Women for Afghan Women. The organisation was founded in 2001 and has seven shelters across Afghanistan.

== See also ==
- Bibi Aisha, another Afghan teenager abused by in-laws, Aisha was featured on the cover of Time magazine in 2010
- Malala Yousafzai, a 17-year-old Pakistani student who was the subject of an attempted assassination attempt and has since become a prominent human rights activist
- Children's rights
- Women's rights in Afghanistan
- Swara (custom)
