= 2019–2020 Afghanistan protests =

Series of protests in Afghanistan in 2019-2020

- Date: August 2019 – September 2020
- Location: Afghanistan
- Caused by: Alleged electoral fraud during the 2019 Afghan presidential election; Taliban insurgency and war in Afghanistan
- Goals: Resignation of President Ashraf Ghani; Fresh general elections
- Methods: Demonstrations
- Result: Protests suppressed by force

Parties
(Islamic Republic of Afghanistan) Protesters	(Islamic Republic of Afghanistan) Government of Afghanistan; Afghan National Police

Deaths and injuries
- Deaths: 11-24
- Injuries: Disputed

The 2019–2020 Afghanistan protests were a series of sometimes violent demonstrations and protests against the government of the Islamic Republic of Afghanistan in the wake of the 2019 Afghan presidential election.

== Background and motives ==
Between August 2019–September 2020, a series of national protests and wave of unprecedented violence hit major areas across the country after the 2019 Afghan presidential election. Riot police tried to contain and quell the mass unrest from spreading by cutting electricity and energy sources, and internet was blocked for several days after the protests broke out. An increase in violence and a spike in violence across the nation also sparked city-wide protests in more than a dozen cities in August–September. Violent protests rocked Herat and anti-Taliban protesters took to the streets, waving the Afghan flag and chanting slogans against president Ashraf Ghani. A series of massive anti-war protests swept across the country as the streets were blocked by blockades in August–September.

== Responses and casualties ==
Six were killed when police open fire on demonstrators. A wave of popular protests swept Afghanistan in January, demanding an end to war, justice, trials on corruption and an end to the government. 2 were killed in the ensuing clashes and riots. Another six were killed during surging protests against violence against women and targeting journalists but their main demands was food aid on 9 May. Afghans also rallied in a series of anti-war and anti-airstrike protests that weaved through Kabul in June–July after a series of killings and car attacks prompted fury among witnesses and civilians. These protests were met with water cannon. Tehran has denounced massive protests in June–July 2020 in Afghanistan against the violence against Afghan immigrants in Iran.

== See also ==
- 2012 Afghanistan Quran burning protests
