= Mohammed Zia Salehi =

Mohammed Zia Salehi is the chief of administration for the National Security Council in Afghanistan. He was previously an intelligence officer and in 2004 was appointed head of administration for the National Security Council. He was a trusted advisor and aid to the president of Afghanistan, Hamid Karzai.

A New York Times article in 2010, citing "officials in Kabul and Washington," reported that Salehi was on the payroll of the Central Intelligence Agency. The article stated that it is not clear what Salehi did for the CIA. An official in the US government defended the CIA’s ties to Salehi, saying, “If we decide…we’ll never deal with anyone in Afghanistan who might…put his hand in the till, we can all come home right now. If you want intelligence in a war zone, you’re not going to get it from Mother Teresa or Mary Poppins.”

Salehi was accused of accepting a car from the deputy director of New Ansari Exchange in return for seeking the release of a detained Afghan dealer. In July 2010, Salehi was arrested by Afghan law enforcement, however, within hours, the Afghanistan president at the time, Hamid Karzai, ordered his release. Soon after, the Afghan government dropped all charges.
