= Karim Khalili =

Afghan Hazara politician

Karim Khalili کریم خلیلی
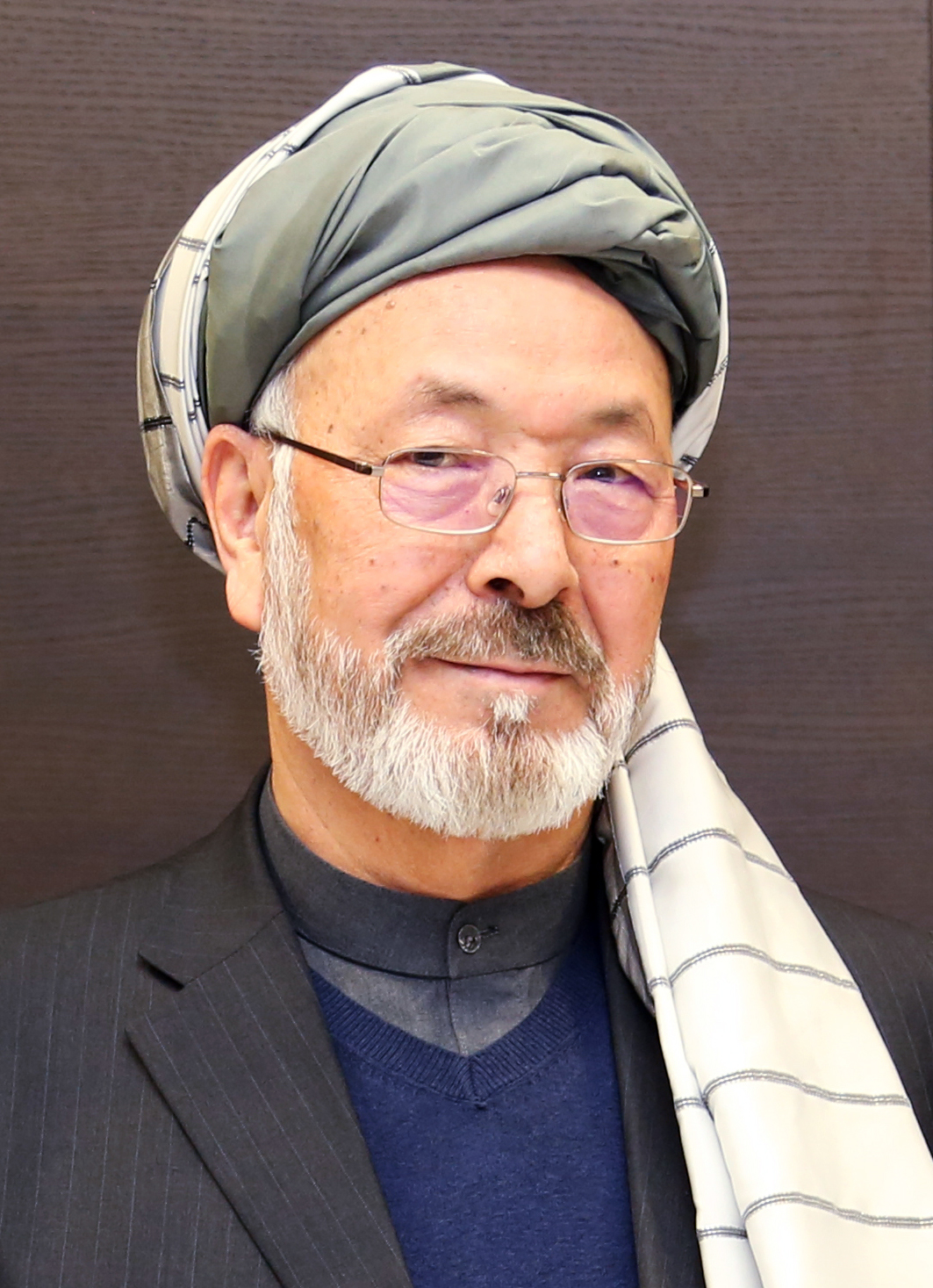
- Khalili in 2018

Chairman of the Afghan High Peace Council
- Incumbent
- Assumed office 6 June 2017
- President: Ashraf Ghani
- Preceded by: Ahmed Gailani

Second Vice President of Afghanistan
- In office 7 December 2004 – 29 September 2014
- President: Hamid Karzai
- Preceded by: Ahmed Shakar Karkar
- Succeeded by: Sarwar Danish

Personal details
- Born: 1950 (age 75–76) Maidan Wardak Province, Kingdom of Afghanistan
- Party: Hezbe Wahdat
- Other political affiliations: Hezbe Wahdat (1989-1993)
- Children: 2
- Profession: Politician, leader, former Mujahideen leader

Karim Khalili (born 1950) is an Afghan politician serving as leader of the Hezb-e Wahdat Islami Afghanistan party. Most recently he was Chief of the Afghan High Peace Council from 2017 until its dissolvement in 2019. He was selected as a candidate for Second Vice President of Afghanistan in 2002 by Hamid Karzai; they were elected in 2004 and left office in 2014. Since 1989, he has also been one of the main leaders of the Wahdat political party of Hazara.

== Early life ==
Khalili was born in the Maidan Wardak Province of Afghanistan in 1950 as either Muhammad Karim Khalili or Abdul Karim Khalili and belongs to Hazara ethnic group. He attended religious schools during his childhood and moved to Kabul in 1970 to continue his education. He participated in the Afghanistan resistance during Soviet invasion. He also served as Minister of Finance of Afghanistan during the Mujahideen government in the early 1990s.

== Personal life ==
He has two sons, the older of which is Mohammad Taqi Khalili, Afghanistan's Ambassador to Azerbaijan.

Political offices
Preceded by Position created	Vice President of Afghanistan; 2004–2014	Succeeded by Sarwar Danish
