= Abdul Salam Azimi =

Afghan judge (1936–2026)

- عبدالسلام عظیمی
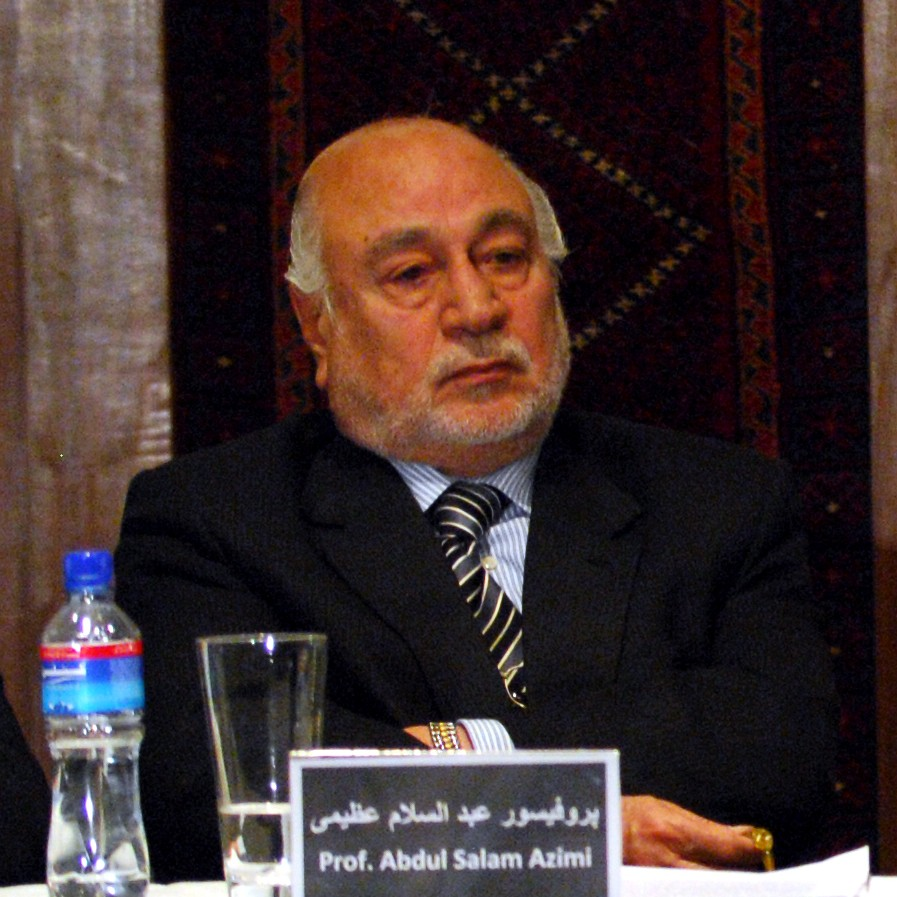
- Azimi in 2009

Chief Justice of Afghanistan
- In office 5 August 2006 – 23 October 2014
- President: Hamid Karzai
- Preceded by: Fazal Hadi Shinwari
- Succeeded by: Sayed Yousuf Halim

Personal details
- Born: 1936 Farah Province, Kingdom of Afghanistan
- Died: January 2026 (aged 90) Turkey
- Children: 5
- Education: Al-Azhar University

Abdul Salam Azimi (1936 – January 2026) was an Afghan judge who was the Chief Justice of Afghanistan and, as such, the head of the Supreme Court of Afghanistan from August 2006 to October 2014, when he resigned his position.

A professor at the University of Nebraska Omaha (UNO) in the United States, Azimi served as legal advisor to Afghan President Hamid Karzai and assisted with writing the 2004 Constitution of Afghanistan.

He was an ethnic Pashtun of the Alizai tribe. Prior to the Soviet invasion of Afghanistan in 1979, Azimi and his family resided in the Kabul province of Afghanistan and were forced to flee the country in 1989 after the fall of the Communist regime and the resulting civil war. Azimi had three daughters and three sons, one being Abdul Ghafar Azimi who studied in Omaha, Nebraska and graduated from the UNO, and another is Hanan Azimi, who also studied at the UNO, and is a respected teacher in the Omaha area. As chief justice, Azimi replaced Faisal Ahmad Shinwari, a conservative Islamic cleric who lacked higher education. Azimi, by contrast, gained a reputation as a fair-minded moderate active in upholding the rule of law and improving the country's dilapidated legal system.

Azimi's death at the age of 90 was announced on 22 January 2026.

== See also ==
- Politics of Afghanistan
