= 2002 in Afghanistan =

- Decades: 1980s; 1990s; 2000s; 2010s; 2020s
- See also: Other events of 2002; List of years in Afghanistan

The following lists events that happened during 2002 in Afghanistan.

== Incumbents ==
- President: Hamid Karzai
- Vice President: Hedayat Amin Arsala
- Vice President: Mohammed Fahim
- Vice President: Nematullah Shahrani
- Vice President: Karim Khalili
- Vice President: Abdul Qadir (until 6 July)
- Chief Justice: Faisal Ahmad Shinwari

== January ==
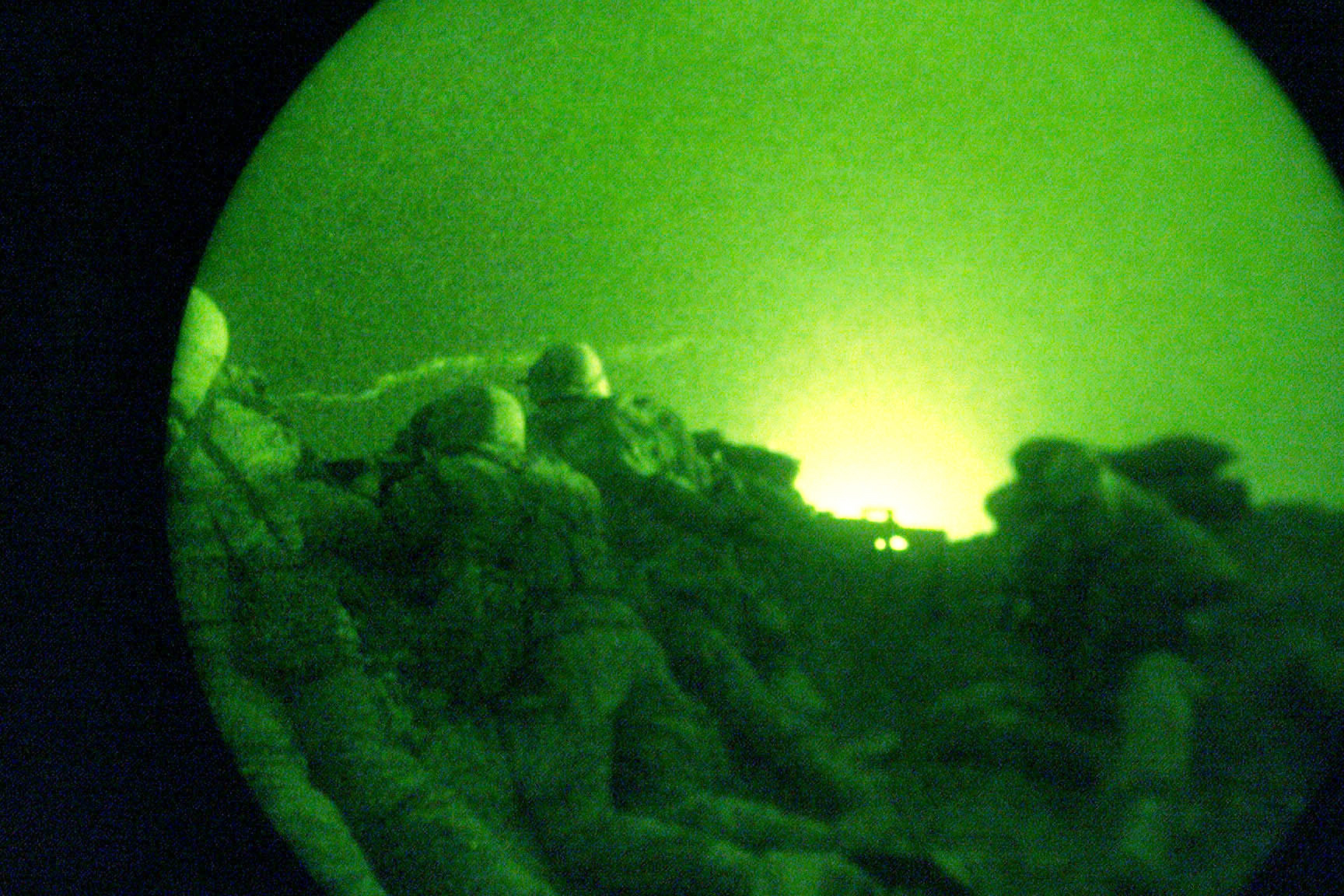
The U.S. 26th MEU in combat at Kandahar airport on January 10

January 3–14: U.S. aircraft bombed a suspected Taliban complex in eastern Afghanistan.

Friday, January 4: Sgt. 1st Class Nathan Ross Chapman of San Antonio, Texas, was killed in an ambush in eastern Afghanistan, the first U.S. soldier to die by hostile fire. A CIA operative was also wounded.

Wednesday, January 9: Seven U.S. Marines were killed when their plane hit a mountain while landing in Pakistan. In the first three months of the campaign, 15 U.S. personnel died.

Thursday, January 10: U.S. forces engaged in a firefight with unknown forces as a transport plane took off in Kandahar.

January 24, the Hazar Qadam raid Americans accidentally attacked an allied compound collecting weapons for their Karzai government.

Sunday, January 27: U.S. Special forces backed a local Afghan militia attack which killed 6 Al-Qaeda personnel held up in a hospital in Kandahar.

== February ==
Friday, February 1: Snow at Kabul International Airport forced the plane of Afghan interim leader Hamid Karzai to land in Bagram, as he returned after a week-long trip abroad that took him to the United States and the United Kingdom.

- Making India his first foreign itinerary, Afghanistan's Uzbek strongman and Deputy Defense Minister Abdul Rashid Dostum flew to New Delhi to hold a lengthy meeting with Defense Minister George Fernandes.

Saturday, February 2: Afghan interim leader Hamid Karzai established a special committee to investigate factional violence threatening the stability of Afghanistan. The nine-member commission, headed by Border Affairs Minister Amanullah Zadran, flew by helicopter immediately to the eastern city of Gardez where violence had erupted days before.

- The United Nations High Commissioner for Refugees estimated that 55,000 people at one Spinboldak camp were Kochi.
- Ten truckloads of weapons and ammunition were sent to re-arm the men of Hamid Karzai's recently appointed governor for Paktia, Bacha Khan. Forces loyal to warlord Padshah Khan did not want Bacha Khan as governor and were dismayed that U.S. forces operating in the area would not come to their rescue.
- The U.S. military finished construction of Camp X-Ray in Guantanamo Bay, Cuba. The completion of the camp raised its capacity from 158 to 320, and included three air-conditioned, wooden huts where military intelligence officers and representatives of other U.S. agencies interrogated prisoners, one at a time in shifts that typically lasted about an hour.

Sunday, February 3: In Gardez, Afghanistan, Afghan and United Nations mediators, joined by U.S. officials, extracted a conditional cease-fire agreement from Bacha Khan and Padshah Khan.

- A group of 75 Canadian soldiers, the first in an expected contingent of 750, arrived at the U.S.-commandeered airfield in Kandahar. The Canadian force will work alongside U.S. Army soldiers from the 101st Airborne Division guarding suspected Taliban and al-Qaeda prisoners at Kandahar, and could also engage in combat or humanitarian missions.

Monday, February 4: Yacine Akhnouche and two others were arrested near Paris. Arknouche told police he had met suspected shoe bomber Richard Reid and Zacarias Moussaoui at a training camp in Afghanistan in 2000.

Tuesday, February 5: Calling on his countrymen to "take each other's hands" to rebuild the nation, interim Afghan leader Hamid Karzai raised Afghanistan's new flag over the presidential palace. The flag had been originally approved by the 1964 constitution as Afghanistan's national emblem but had not flown over government offices in Kabul since the Taliban took over in the early 1990s. The ceremony, which lasted about 15 minutes, was attended by cabinet ministers, diplomats and former president Burhanuddin Rabbani.

- Interim leader Afghan Hamid Karzai met with visiting British Defense Secretary Geoff Hoon. At their talks, Karzai requested that the British-led peacekeeping force expand beyond Kabul, but Hoon said he believed the current deployment level was adequate.

Wednesday, February 6: In attempts to bring peace between feuding warlords, Afghanistan's interim leader Hamid Karzai visited Herat.

Thursday, February 7: U.S. President George W. Bush decided that the 1949 Geneva Conventions would apply to captured Taliban fighters taken from Afghanistan to a US military base at Guantánamo Bay, Cuba, but not to al-Qaeda members there.

Friday, February 8: Pakistan President Gen. Pervez Musharraf and Afghan interim leader Hamid Karzai agreed to cooperate on a proposed Trans-Afghanistan Pipeline project to transport natural gas from Central Asia to Pakistan via Afghanistan.

Saturday, February 9: Hamid Karzai, head of the Afghan interim government, appointed Maulvi Zia-ul-haq Haqyar and Sayed Ikramuddin Masoomi as the new governors of Baghlan and Takhar provinces in northern Afghanistan.

- The United States brought another 34 al-Qaeda and Taliban suspects to Camp X-Ray on Guantanamo Bay in Cuba.

Sunday, February 10: Interim Afghan leader Hamid Karzai released more than 300 captured Taliban soldier. Karzai said they were innocent and urged them to find jobs.

- Afghan interim Defense Minister Mohammad Qasim Fahim went to Moscow to seek Russia's support in creating an Afghan army to replace the current force of tribal and ethnic militias.
- In the presence of Afghan officials, Wakil Ahmad Mutawakil voluntarily surrendered at the U.S. airbase just outside Kandahar.
- Interim Afghan leader Hamid Karzai arrived at Abu Dhabi in the United Arab Emirates. Karzai was greeted by UAE army chief of staff Sheikh Mohammed bin Zayed Al Nahyan and Information Minister Sheikh Abdullah bin Zayed.

Monday, February 11: Interim Afghan leader Hamid Karzai met with United Arab Emirates President His Highness Sheikh Zayed bin Sultan Al Nahyan. The UAE announced it allocated $6 million for Afghan humanitarian relief, setting up refugee camps on the Pakistan-Afghan border near the Pakistan town of Chaman. Karzai reopened the Afghan embassy.

- The Afghan government in Kabul appointed Qari Baba as the governor of eastern Ghazni province.

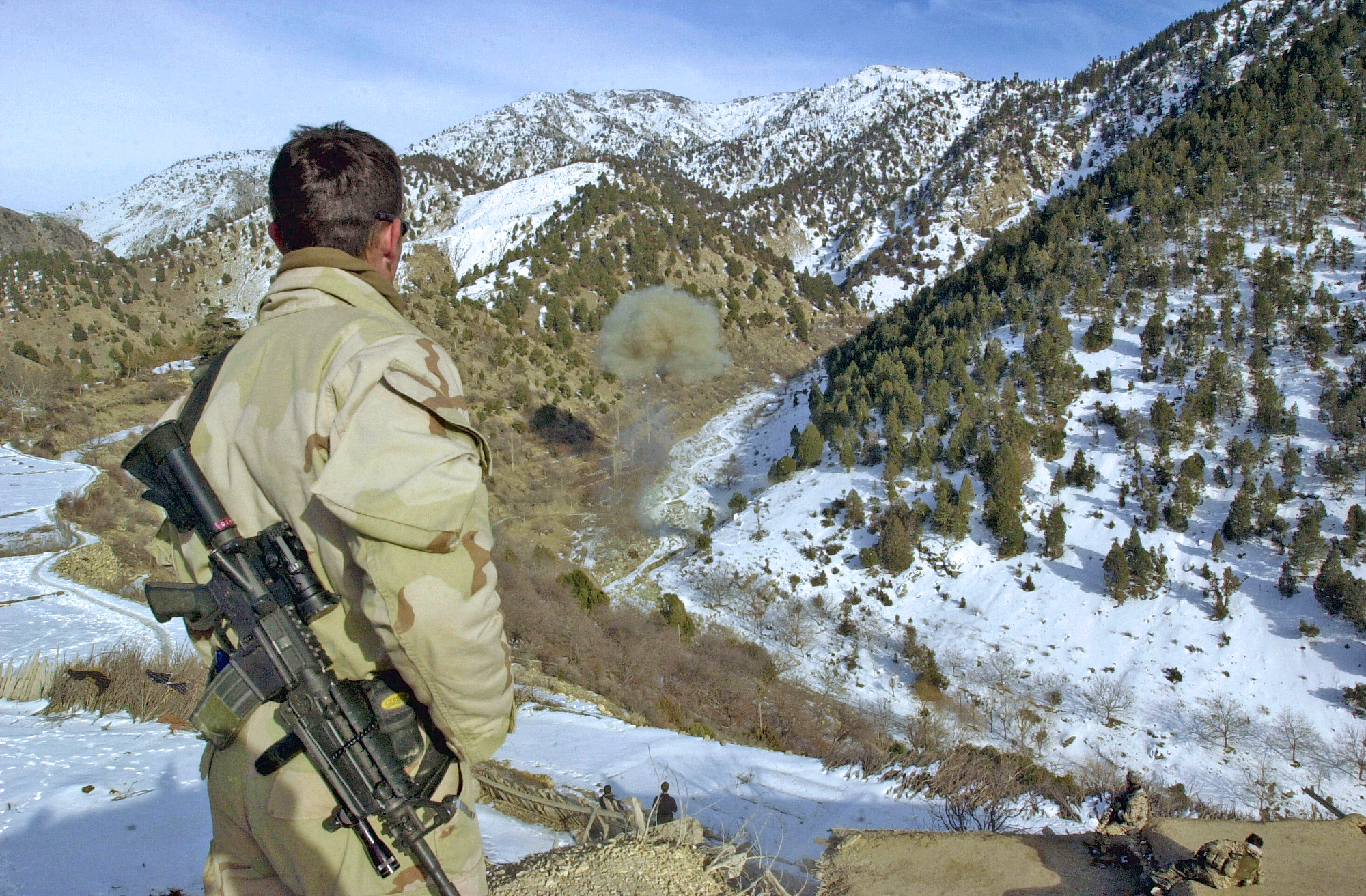
U.S. Navy SEALs destroy captured munitions in eastern Afghanistan, February 12

Tuesday, February 12: Interim Afghan leader Hamid Karzai warned warlords to remove their check posts and chains on roads.

Wednesday, February 13: The United States Congress stepped in to find nearly $300m in humanitarian and reconstruction funds for Afghanistan after the Bush administration failed to request any money in the latest budget.

- Two U.S. soldiers in Kandahar are wounded during a firefight with unknown forces. Afghan officials characterized it as a "mistake".

Thursday, February 14: Afghan interim leader Hamid Karzai visited Jalalabad to attend a function being held there in memory of former mujahedin commander Abdul Haq. Haq was brother of the Jalalabad governor, Haji Abdul Qadir.

- Afghanistan's aviation and tourism minister, Abdul Rahman, was killed in what appeared to be a mob attack on his plane at Kabul's airport by pilgrims angry that they had been unable to travel to Mecca, Saudi Arabia. Witnesses and officials said pilgrims beat the minister to death and tossed his body to the tarmac. However, Prime Minister Hamid Karzai accused six senior government officials of the murder, saying that they were motivated by a long-standing feud. Three were arrested and the others were being sought in Saudi Arabia. Karzai said five ministers, including the head of the intelligence ministry, Gen. Abdullah Tawhedi; the technical deputy of the Ministry of Defense, Gen. Qalander Big, and a Supreme Court justice, Haji Halim—and 15 other suspects have been linked to the assassination.

Friday, February 15: Fighting broke out at a goodwill soccer game between an Afghanistan national team and international peacekeepers. Guards beat back overflowing crowds trying to enter the stadium. Play went on anyway despite the clash, and the international team won the game three to one. Afghanistan's former Taliban government had used the Kabul stadium for public executions and other harsh punishment to enforce its fundamentalist version of Islamic rules.

Saturday, February 16: The first attack on International Security Assistance Force (ISAF) soldiers since their initial deployment in Afghanistan on December 22, 2001, occurred when a post in Kabul came under attack before dawn. Soldiers of the 2nd Parachute Battalion returned fire, and the gunmen fled in a car. Later, a car at a nearby house was discovered riddled with bullets. One man was found dead and five hurt.

Tuesday, February 19: The Pentagon ordered two U.S. bombing raids against Afghan militias opposed to the new administration led by Hamid Karzai. This marked a turn in strategy. Previously, all U.S. military operation had focused strictly on Taliban and al-Qaeda forces.

Saturday, February 23: Two rockets are fired at the U.S. base in Kandahar, but don't inflict any damage.

Sunday, February 24: Afghan interim leader Hamid Karzai arrived in Tehran, Iran to meet with reformist President Mohammad Khatami and his government and to exchange views on regional issues, including the future of Afghan refugees. Iran pledged $560 million to Afghan reconstruction over five years. The meetings take place despite U.S. accusations of Iran's inclusion in U.S. President George W. Bush's "axis of evil". Traveling with Karzai were Afghan Ministers of Foreign Affairs Abdullah, Immigration Affairs Enayatullah Nazari, Commerce Sayed Mustafa Kazemi, Transport Sultan Hamid Sultan, Information and Culture Rahim Makhdoom, Agriculture Sayed Hussein Anwari, and Rural Development Abdul Malik Anwar.

Monday, February 25: The first units of a new Afghan army started training in Kabul. The U.S. was assisting in the creation of the army.

- Afghan interim leader Hamid Karzai signed an accord with Iranian President Mohammad Khatami to fight terrorism and drug trafficking, and not to interfere in each other's affairs.
- Afghan interim leader Hamid Karzai met Iran's spiritual guide Ayatollah Ali Khamenei and parliament speaker Mehdi Karrubi. He also addressed the Iranian parliament. Later in the day, Karzai urged Tehran and Washington, D.C. to work together for Afghanistan's reconstruction.

Tuesday, February 26: Accompanied by a strong 36-member delegation, which includes Foreign Minister Abdullah, Afghanistan interim head Hamid Karzai arrived in New Delhi, India to discuss efforts underway for rehabilitation and reconstruction.

Wednesday, February 27: Afghan interim leader Hamid Karzai attended a special ceremonial reception at the Rashtrapati Bhavan in New Delhi, India. He also had visits with Indian President Kocheril Raman Narayanan and Prime Minister Atal Bihari Vajpayee, Vice President Krishan Kant, and Leader of Opposition Sonia Gandhi.

== March ==
Saturday, March 2: In an incident of friendly fire, U.S. Army Chief Warrant Officer Stanley Harriman, of the Third Special Forces Group, and two Afghans were killed by a U.S. AC-130 gunship that mistook their convoy for enemies. They had been moving into position for Operation Anaconda. Three U.S. and 14 Afghan troops were wounded in the attack. It was originally reported that they were ambushed.

Sunday, March 3: Seven U.S. soldiers are killed when their helicopter is shot down during Operation Anaconda

Wednesday, March 6: A blast killed two German and three Danish soldiers as they defused a Soviet-made SA-3 anti-aircraft missiles near the airport in Kabul. Eight people were wounded.

Saturday, March 9: The International Committee of the Red Cross (ICRC), the International Federation of Red Cross and Red Crescent Societies and the Afghan Red Crescent Society (ARCS) jointly celebrated International Women's Day in Kabul. Attending the event were over 130 ARCS staff members and volunteers, representatives of the Afghan government and of local and foreign non-government organizations. Tribute was paid to the women who had played a crucial role in helping children survive.

Monday, March 11: Through his deputy, Qutbuddin Hilal, Gulbuddin Hekmatyar pledged support for Hamid Karzai. Hekmatyar also supported the return of the king.

Wednesday, March 20: A Special forces soldier is wounded during a firefight near Khost.

Thursday, March 21: UNICEF completed a "Back to school" project, providing thousands of basic packs for the schools, students and teachers in Afghanistan.

Wednesday, March 27: A U.S. soldier is killed by a mine outside of Kandahar.

Thursday, March 28: The U.N. Security Council voted to create a U.N. assistance mission in Afghanistan for one year.

== April ==
Tuesday, April 2: In Kabul, Pakistani President General Pervez Musharraf met with Afghanistan's interim leader Hamid Karzai, in the first visit by a Pakistani leader in more than 30 years. The two planned to mend relations and work together to promote stability in Afghanistan.

Wednesday, April 3: A tripartite accord regarding repatriation of refugees was signed in Geneva by Iran, Afghanistan, and the United Nations High Commissioner for Refugees

Saturday, April 6: Three Danish and two German explosives experts were killed while defusing Soviet-built SA-3 anti-aircraft missiles near Kabul's airport. Eight others were injured. In November 2002, a Danish-German report would conclude that the explosives experts did not follow safety regulations while disarming two of the missiles. By March 2003 two Danish officers would face preliminary charges of negligence.

Tuesday, April 9: A joint program between UNHCR and Iran encouraging repatriation of Afghan refugees went into effect. (see details of the UNHCR Afghan repatriation programs)

Saturday, April 13: A U.S.-Afghan patrol comes under attack by 20 militants, air support is called in which killed five of them.

Sunday, April 14: A U.S. airbase is attacked by two RPGS.

Monday, April 15: Operation Mountain Lion began in the Gardez and Khost regions.

Wednesday, April 17: Two U.S. pilots, Majors Harry Schmidt and William Umbach, returning from a 10-hour patrol, at more than 15,000 feet, spotted surface-to-air fire and feared it was from Taliban forces. Thinking Umbach was under attack, Schmidt asked flight control permission to fire his 20 mm cannons, to which flight control replied "hold fire." Four seconds later, Schmidt said he was "rolling in, in self defense." He dropped a laser-guided bomb 35 seconds after that, wounding eight and killing Sgt. Marc Leger, Cpl. Ainsworth Dyer, Pvt. Richard Green and Pvt. Nathan Smith, members of the 3rd Battalion of the Princess Patricia's Canadian Light Infantry. The troops were at Tarnak Farms, a former al-Qaeda training area near Kandahar that allied forces had begun using as a practice range. The Canadians were firing anti-tank and machine-gun rounds horizontally, not vertically in a way that would have threatened the two F-16s.

- A U.S. soldier is shot in the face in Kandahar by an unknown assailant.

== May ==
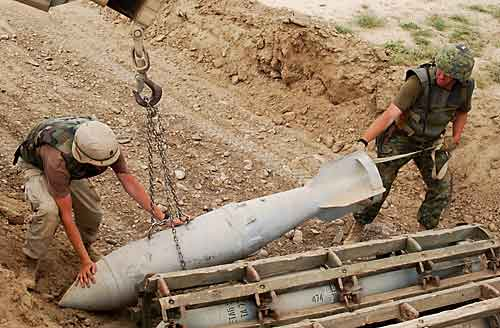
Canadian Army soldiers dispose of a Soviet bomb found near Kandahar Airport in 2002.

May 2002: Combined Joint Task Force 180 becomes the most senior U.S. military headquarters in the country.

Wednesday, 1 May 2002, A U.S. Green Beret was wounded near Bagram.

Sunday, May 19: A U.S. Special forces soldier is killed in a firefight near Skhin, Paktia province.

Monday, May 20: Japan extended its logistics support for the U.S.-led anti-terrorism campaign in and around Afghanistan for another six months.

Wednesday, May 22: U.S. planes bomb a group of suspected militants near the Pakistani border.

Thursday, May 30: Two C-130 Hercules used to airlift food to Ghor Province in central Afghanistan during the winter returned to their African base. They had flown back and forth between Herat or Mashad, Iran and Ghor almost every day for five months, distributing 6,400 metric tons of food and seeds to more than 460,000 Afghans.

Friday, May 31: In an incident of friendly fire, U.S. troops killed three of their Afghan allies during a firefight.

- U.S. aircraft attacked a suspected rocket launch site after troops come under rocket attack near Lwara.

== June ==
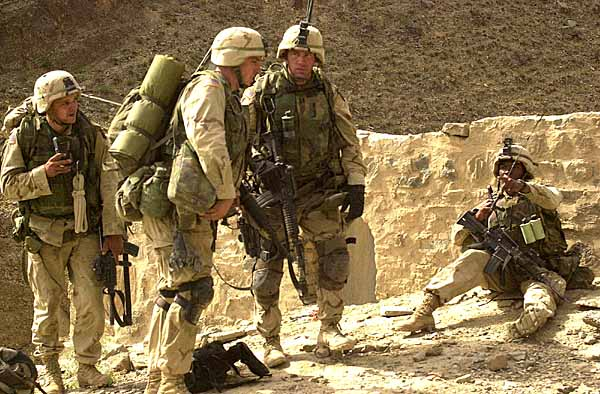
U.S. 2nd Battalion, 187th Infantry Regiment soldiers in a village near the Pakistani border during Operation Mountain Lion, June 2

Sunday June 1: U.S. troops kill a suspected enemy fighter near Lwara.

Tuesday, June 18: An unidentified group launches rockets within Kabul, and several rockets land in the vicinity of the U.S. Embassy.

- U.S. Special forces soldiers kill two gunmen who attacked them in Tarin Kowt. Elsewhere, U.S. Special forces soldiers accompanied by 40 Afghan soldiers called in close air support after coming under attack near Skhin.

Monday, June 24: U.S. forces fire mortars and call in close air support after coming under rocket fire near Jalalabad.

Sunday, June 30: Two RPGs are fired at the U.S. airbase near Kandahar.

== July ==
Monday, July 1: In central Uruzgan province, a U.S. B-52 struck suspected al-Qaeda and Taliban cave and bunker complexes, while an AC-130 gunship strafed several villages. U.S. officials said they believed the villages were legitimate targets, but Afghan authorities said that 48 civilians were killed and 117 were injured at a wedding party. The United States said a plane had come under attack from people on the ground, although no anti-aircraft weapons were found.

Sunday, July 2: A U.S. soldier is slightly wounded after a U.S. convoy came under fire near a hospital in Kandahar.

Thursday, July 12: A U.S. compound in Tarin Kowt comes under small arms fire but no casualties are reported.

Saturday, July 27: US soldiers surrounded a compound near Khost and a firefight took place. Randy Watt led a group of the US soldiers to search the compound, in the belief that everybody had been killed. Two people had survived however, Omar Khadr and an unidentified man, one of whom threw a grenade killing Christopher J. Speer.

== August ==
Monday, August 5: U.S. Special forces kill two people after coming under fire near Asadabad.

Tuesday, August 6: U.S. troops kill four people in a car after a passenger with a gun attempted to open fire on them.

Wednesday, August 7: At least 15 people were killed when suspected al-Qaeda gunmen attacked an army base in the southern outskirts of Kabul.

Friday, August 9: A powerful car bomb exploded at a construction company's warehouse in Jalalabad, killing 25 people and injuring 80 others.

- A U.S. soldier is shot by sniper near Lwara.

Sunday, August 18: Two U.S. Special forces soldiers are wounded by gunfire in Uruzgan Province.

August 18–26: During Operation Mountain Sweep, 2,000 U.S. and Afghan troops detain 10 suspects, they come under fire twice but sustain no casualties. the force of U.S. Army Rangers and other coalition special forces, accompanied by members of the 82nd airborne division mounted five air assaults on the area surrounding the villages of Dormat and Narizah. The force found an anti aircraft gun, two 82mm mortars, recoilless rifles, rocket propelled grenade launchers, machine guns, small arms and ammunition for all of them.

Friday, August 23: The Czech Defense Ministry announced that some of the Czech troops currently stationed in Kuwait will be deployed in Afghanistan at the request of allies.

Wednesday, August 28: U.S. Special forces kill an armed man who displayed "hostile intent" near Lwara.

== September ==
Thursday, September 5: A car bomb was detonated in downtown Kabul, Afghanistan, killing more than 30 Afghans.

- Afghan President Hamid Karzai was the target of an assassination attempt, prompting him to replace his Afghan bodyguards with U.S. special forces.
- A U.S. Special forces soldier was slightly wounded by gunfire in the incident.

Wednesday, September 11: U.S. troops in Bagram wound a gunman who opened fire on a guard tower.

September 15: Two U.S. soldiers are injured by an explosive device in eastern Afghanistan.

Friday, September 20: A U.S. base in Lwara comes under attack by rockets and small arms fire. U.S. forces respond with small arms and mortar fire, and called in airstrikes.

September 28: A U.S. soldier is grazed by a bullet while in a convoy travelling to Kabul.

== October ==
October 5: A U.S. soldier in a helicopter northwest of Kandahar is wounded by gunfire, soldiers in the helicopter return fire killing one attacker and wounding another.

Tuesday October 15: A rocket hits a U.S. bunker in Lwara amidst a rocket attack, U.S. forces detain three suspects.

Wednesday October 23 Mortar fire is directed at a U.S. encampment in Asadabad.

- Three New Zealand soldiers are injured when their vehicle hit a land mine near Farah.

Monday, October 28: Iran made an appeal to Kabul to respect a 1972 accord entitling Iran to at least 26 cubic metres of water a second from the Helmand River. When the Taliban ruled Afghanistan, they violated the 1972 accord, with devastating results in Iran's impoverished Sistan-Baluchestan border region. Tens of thousands of cattle and other livestock perished in the ensuing drought. In a sign of improved Tehran-Kabul ties, Afghanistan honored the appeal, but said the flow would only be temporary.

Wednesday, October 30: The top U.N. envoy in Afghanistan, Lakhdar Brahimi, told the U.N. Security Council that the new Afghan government headed by Hamid Karzai did not have the means or power to deal with the underlying problems that cause security threats. Brahimi also voiced a concern that Afghan warlord Gulbuddin Hekmatyar was trying to form an alliance with remnants of the Taliban and al-Qaeda Brahimi also said there would be no long-term security in Afghanistan until a well-trained, well-equipped, and regularly paid national police force and national army are in place.

Thursday, October 31: Afghan authorities began investigating a series of well-coordinated attacks against girls' schools in a central region near Kabul. Four schools in Vardak Province were attacked the previous week in a deliberate and systematic attempt to stop parents from sending their daughters to school. The attackers fired two rockets into school buildings in villages near the town of Maidan Shah, demolishing classroom walls and setting the buildings on fire. They also raided a school at a village mosque, setting fire to its wooden chairs and blackboard. The attackers left behind an unexploded grenade and several leaflets warning parents to keep their girls at home.

- United States paratroopers from the 82nd Airborne Division found three rockets pointing at the US base in Khost, but no arrests were made.
- Two U.S. soldiers were injured when their sports utility vehicle rolled over while traveling in a three-vehicle convoy from the central town of Bamiyan to the U.S. headquarters at Bagram. One of the soldiers lost consciousness and the other suffered cuts to a hand.
- A U.S. special forces soldier was shot in the leg when his unit came under fire on a road outside Jalalabad. The wound was not life-threatening.

== November ==
During November the U.S. military reported 60 attacks on their forces, up from 5 in July.

Friday, November 1: About 60 kilometers east of Khost, in Gardez, three rockets exploded just after midnight about one kilometer southwest of a compound housing U.S. special forces soldiers.

- Two 107 mm rockets exploded before dawn within 500 meters of Camp Salerno, near the city of Khost. Another exploded 10 minutes later near Chapman Airfield, a few kilometers away.
- A spokesman for the United Nations Population Fund reported that in Afghanistan 50 women were dying each day during labor. In some parts of the country, women could not be treated by male doctors.
- Pakistan turned over to U.S. forces 25 suspected al-Qaeda fighters. They were taken to the Kandahar base, bringing the total number of detainees there to 189. The U.S. also is holding 12 prisoners at Bagram air base north of Kabul, one in Mazari Sharif and eight on a U.S. Navy ship in the Arabian Sea.

Saturday, November 2: Tajik forces loyal to Ismail Khan, the governor of Herat Province, launched the attack in the Zer-e-Koh district, killing two civilians and injuring 15 in a crowded market. Ismail Khan, a former governor, took back control of Herat after the fall of the Taliban. But local Pashtuns have complained his forces have looted and oppressed them.

- The U.S. base in Asadabad, Afghanistan in Kunar province came under rocket or mortar fire. No injuries were reported.
- Afghan security officials in Jalalabad found two bombs connected to timers set to go off in a busy market area. Authorities were unable to neutralize the bombs, but streets were blocked off around one before it detonated on its own. A second bomb found nearby was taken to a secure location at an intelligence ministry compound where it exploded. Neither blast caused casualties.
- Two rockets exploded near a U.S. base at Orgun, about 110 miles (180 km) south of Kabul. One of the rockets landed about 500 metres (yards) from the base.
- An emergency cabinet meeting was called by Afghan President Hamid Karzai to decide the fate of some 15 local commanders. The moves were intended to bring unruly and corrupt provincial leaders into line. In Nangarhar province (one of the major suppliers of Afghanistan's illicit opium exports) several officials were dismissed for their links with the drug trade. The directors of customs, agriculture and public works were also dismissed. Two security chiefs in the principal northern city of Mazari Sharif were fired, including Sayeed Kamal, a powerful commander once in charge of five provincial districts.
- Two people were killed when Ismail Khan's men shelled a busy market place in a Pashtun community in the south of the province.

Sunday, November 3: A rocket exploded 500 meters from a U.S. base in Deh Rahwod District in Uruzgan Province, Afghanistan.

- A delegation from Herat Province on made its second visit to Hamid Karzai to call for the removal of Ismail Khan, the Tajik governor and self-styled "Emir of Herat", after his troops attacked ethnic Pashtuns.
- The night curfew in Kabul was lifted for the first time in 23 years.
- Former Afghan King Mohammad Zaher Shah inaugurated a special committee set up to draft a new constitution for this war-ravaged nation. The nine-member committee, headed by Vice President Nayiamatullah Shahrani, took on the task of preparing a preliminary draft of the document and to later be reviewed by a constitutional commission. The final draft would be approved by a constitutionalloya jirga in 2003.
- Acting on tips 400 U.S. troops raided Naray and nearby Kot Kalay. They found one-hundred and fifteen 107 mm rockets, 14 rocket-propelled grenades, land mines, detonators and thousands of rounds of ammunition, some of it armor-piercing. An entire wedding party, decked in their best clothes, arriving at a mosque and were told to sit outside. They were told not to move. Everyone was frisked. Teams then moved through homes, pulling clothing from trunks, opening bins of flour and cutting plaster from walls to look for hidden compartments. A trunk of AK-47s and "toe-popper" landmines were found under a haystack; other weapons were discovered under beds or wrapped in rugs. Villagers were detained overnight. The villagers were then freed, except for five detainees, who were taken to helicopters with bags over their heads. The troops left the shotguns and long rifles they found, but kept the AK-47s. The troops then left in their Black Hawks. Troops found AK-47s in the second town, Kot Kalay, but little else.
- Three rocket-propelled grenade rounds were fired at a U.S. base in the southeastern town of Shkin in Paktika Province, about 150 miles (240 km) south of Kabul.
- A U.S. base near Kandahar came under small-arms fire from a lone gunman. U.S. troops were deployed but failed to find the shooter.
- U.S. troops at a base in Deh Rawod in Uruzgan Province fired an illumination round after "two unknown personnel were seen" about 300 metres (yards) away. The two then fired five rounds at U.S. troops in a guard tower on the base and fled on foot.
- U.S. 82nd Airborne paratroopers ended a 24-hour operation northeast of Khost that netted 20 mines, 60 grenades, 20 rifles or shotguns, and thousands of artillery and automatic weapon rounds. Six people were also detained in the operation, and Taliban literature and documents were seized.

Tuesday, November 5: A rocket or mortar was fired at a U.S. Army Special Forces base in Gardez, but caused no injuries.

- In a 51-page report titled All Our Hopes Are Crushed: Violence and Repression in Western Afghanistan, Human Rights Watch alleged that the governor of Herat, Ismail Khan, ordered politically motivated arrests and beatings throughout 2002. The report detailed lashings with thorny branches, sticks, cables and rifle butts. In the most serious cases, prisoners were hung upside down, whipped or tortured with electric shocks. The group also reported that there were no independent media in Herat and no public meetings allowed in Herat. Khan's Herat was described in the report as a closed society without room for dissent, independent opinion or personal freedoms. The report called for the expansion of the International Security Assistance Force beyondKabul. It also called for US to exert its influence and adopt a peacekeeping role in the regions.

Wednesday, November 6: The Hague announced that the Netherlands will join Germany in taking over command of the U.N. security force inAfghanistan in mid-February 2003. To date, Turkey was in command of the 19-nation, 5,000-strong International Security Assistance Force. Germany had 1,200 soldiers in the force, and the Dutch 240, but those figures would be boosted after the transfer of command. To date, Germany had a total of 10,000 troops serving abroad, second only to the United States.

- Near the town of Khost, U.S. special forces seized five 107 mm rockets aimed at a U.S. airfield in southeastern Afghanistan. The rockets were armed and had fuses, but they had not been timed to fire. A villager told special forces about the weapons.
- Rival factions in northern Afghanistan began turning in their weapons as part of a United Nations monitored program to curb violence. More than 120 assault rifles and some artillery pieces were seized from soldiers loyal to Abdul Rashid Dostum and fighters under Ustad Atta Mohammad in the Sholgara district, southwest of Mazari Sharif.
- A senior U.S. official said an Afghan government defense commission, made up of Afghan officials and warlords, agreed to build up the country's army to 70,000 troops over the next two years. To date, Afghanistan's national army had only 1,000 men.
- International peacekeepers destroyed six missiles that had been seized two days earlier in an abandoned storage facility inKabul. The missiles, three Scud-B warheads and three Frog-7 rockets, were believed to have been in Afghanistan since the Soviet era, and could not be fired. But each of the warheads was fitted with a detonator and each contained about 800 kilograms of TNT. About 4,800 peacekeepers of International Security Assistance Force regularly patrolled Kabul to bolster security. ISAF troops could frequently be scene patrolling the streets in jeeps and armored cars mounted with heavy guns.
- U.N. and U.S. researchers reported that women in Afghanistan were dying during childbirth at a staggeringly high rate. In rural Badakhshan Province, the maternity death rate was highest rate ever documented—6,500 maternal deaths for every 100,000 live births. High death rates for mothers have profound implications for the children.

Thursday, November 7: Afghanistan's President Hamid Karzai ordered the release of 20 female prisoners in a goodwill gesture one day after the start of the holy month of Ramadan. The women had all been detained for petty crimes. The women, held in a Kabul prison, would likely be released over the weekend.

- U.S. special forces shot and killed a gunman who fired on them near the central Afghan town of Deh Rawod. The forces were helping an Afghan policeman who had been fired on when two attackers in civilian clothing opened fire on the U.S. forces with AK-47 assault rifles. The soldiers returned fire, killing one man. The other escaped.
- Eight people fired on U.S. special forces 2 miles (3 km) north of Khost, in eastern Afghanistan. AH-64 Apachehelicopters fired rockets and 30 mm rounds, before the eight fled over a nearby ridge.
- U.S. paratroopers swept through four areas in northeast of Khost, seizing weapons including 28 mines, 76 hand grenades, 147 rocket-launched grenades, 62 launchers, more than 500 round of 5.62 mm rounds. Five men were taken to Khost for questioning.

Friday, November 8: Iran called for the second time in less than two weeks for Kabul to respect a water-sharing accord on the Helmand river flowing from Afghanistan into Iran. Afghan President Hamid Karzai said he would "take care of this issue personally."

- A regional Afghan commander, Haji Mohammed Zaher, escaped unhurt from a shooting incident on the border with Pakistan. One of his bodyguards was killed and another wounded. Zaher had gone to the border to close an illegal checkpoint on the road from Torkham to Jalalabad, where militiamen were stopping motorists and demanding money.
- Unidentified attackers fired four rockets toward the U.S. airfield in Khost. There was no damage.
- It was revealed that the United Nations was using snapshots of eyes to build an iris recognition database of Afghan refugees. The database will enable the U.N. to prevent refugees from fraudulently claiming more than one U.N. aid package per person as they cross the border from Pakistan into Afghanistan.

Saturday, November 9: U.S. helicopters broke up a gun battle between Kuchis and local government forces over a land dispute. After the two sides exchanged fire with light machine-guns and rocket-propelled grenades for two hours, the American helicopters attacked the gunmen's positions on cliffs surrounding Kikara village, near Khost, Afghanistan. Six gunmen were wounded in the clash.

Sunday, November 10: As part of an international effort in Afghanistan, work began on rebuilding a major highway. The project was expected to cost $250 million, two thirds of it pledged by the United States, Japan and Saudi Arabia. The 750 mile (1,200 km) route, which runs fromKabul through Kandahar and then to Herat, was built in the 1960s with U.S. funds, but devastated during the 1980s Soviet occupation and the civil war that followed.

Monday, November 11: A team of representatives of the Afghan Human Rights Commission and the U.N. was dispatched to the north to look into the reports that witnesses of mass killings were being harassed, detained, tortured and executed.

- A dozen gaunt Pakistani men, some wrapped in ragged shawls against the cold, were released from a prison in Kabul, Afghanistan. They had been held since the collapse of the Taliban one year earlier.
- At least four students of Kabul University were killed and dozens injured, as over 500 students clashed with police in violent demonstrations in Kabul, Afghanistan. Students were protesting over a lack of food and electricity in their dormitory. Several policemen were also injured.
- Ismail Khan, Afghan provincial governor of Herat, reimposed a ban on wedding celebrations at restaurants, on the grounds that they encourage men and women to dance together. The ban was based on a decree from Herat's 60-man Council of Scholars and Clerics. The ban was first imposed by Khan four months ago after a young woman burned herself to death when her parents told her they could not afford to hold her wedding party at a restaurant. Khan later reversed this decision after complaints.

Tuesday, November 12: Hundreds of Kabul University students marched in protest against the killing of four of their colleagues in a demonstration the previous evening. Police fired into the air and used water cannons to break up the march. Many of the poorer students, who lived in the troubled dormitory, were from areas dominated by ethnic Pashtuns, while the university was dominated by ethnic Tajiks.

- A tape of Osama bin Laden was broadcast on by the Arabic-language al-Jazeera satellite television channel based in Qatar. On the tape, he warned U.S. allies that they would be targets of new attacks if they continued to back the United States. He also hailed attacks in Bali, Kuwait, Yemen and Jordan and the Moscow theatre siege a month earlier. The cassette was handed to an Al Jazeera television correspondent in Islamabad by an unidentified man who disappeared immediately.

Wednesday, November 13: 2,000 students assembled outside the gates of Kabul University, refusing to attend lessons until their demands for improved accommodation and justice for those who died in recent protests were met. Students said at least six people died in the two days of unrest. the International Security Assistance Force (ISAF) was not called in to assist. Human Rights Watch claimed that Afghan police tortured and detained students, and that reporters were refused access to students being treated at Wazir Akbar Khan Hospital.

- The FBI told authorities in Houston, Chicago, San Francisco and Washington, D.C. to be aware of threats against hospitals.

Thursday, November 14: Construction began on a key highway connecting Kandahar to Spinboldak, Pakistan. The three-month, US$15 million project was funded by the Asian Development Bank.

- Afghan President Hamid Karzai was awarded the International Rescue Committee's Freedom Award.
- The U.S. Congress passed legislation that calls for $2.3 billion over four years in reconstruction funds for Afghanistan, plus another $1 billion to expand the International Security Assistance Force (ISAF).
- Nine 107 mm rockets were fired at the U.S. military base near Gardez, in eastern Afghanistan. The rockets landed near the base but did not cause any casualties. U.S. forces called in A-10 fighter planes, which dropped several bombs and fired about 2,000 rounds of ammunition. Special forces troops found a suspected enemy vehicle and destroyed a rocket that had not been fired.
- The U.S. base in Lwara came under rocket and mortar fire. At least one round exploded inside the compound. Soldiers from the 82nd Airborne Division moved on the launch site, trading small arms and mortar fire with the suspected attackers. An A-10 plane fired rockets at the launch site and dropped a 500-pound (227 kg) bomb after three suspected enemy fighters were detected moving. Another aircraft dropped a 1,000 pound (450 kg) bomb shortly afterward.

Saturday, November 16: A remote-control 107 mm rocket landed nearly a mile (1.6 km) from the U.S. base near Gardez at around 8 p.m.

- Two rockets were fired at the U.S. airfield near Khost, both falling about a mile (1.6 km) from the base.

Sunday, November 17 The United Nations investigated alleged human rights abuses by Uzbek warlord Abdul Rashid Dostum. Witnesses claimed that Dostum jailed and tortured witnesses to prevent them from testifying in a war crimes case.

Monday, November 18: In New Delhi, India, Afghan Commerce Minister Sayed Mustafa Kazmi and Indian Foreign Minister Yashwant Sinha held talks to put in place a preferential trading arrangement and the setting up of transit routes to jack up bilateral economic cooperation.

- On a visit to the People's Republic of China by Afghan Foreign Minister Dr. Abdullah, PRC Foreign Minister Tang Jiaxuan pledged to write off Afghanistan's multimillion-dollar debt, some of which dated back to the 1960s. To date, China had given Kabul $30 million in 2002 aid.
- U.S. boxer Muhammad Ali began a three-day visit to Kabul as a U.N. Messenger of Peace, visiting a boxing club, a girls' school, and President Hamid Karzai. Ali wanted to bring attention to the world regarding Afghanistan's huge humanitarian needs.
- A U.S. special forces soldier suffered head and hand injuries while rock climbing during a mission near Deh Rawood in centralUruzgan, Afghanistan. He was to be flown to Germany for an operation on his hand.
- U.S. Treasury Secretary Paul O'Neill visited Kabul for the day to demonstrate the U.S. commitment to rebuildingAfghanistan. O'Neill toured a girls' school, new road construction sites, and some fledgling factories making shoes and metal products. O'Neill said that a five-star hotel was under consideration in Kabul, but did not name the possible owners. "Afghanistan will not be forgotten", he told a press conference, "the United States is committed to be here for the long term."

Tuesday, November 19: The newest U.N. refugee camp of Zhare Dasht was criticized as being too remote, overcrowded and dangerously close to a mine field. It was built in the desert on the outskirts of Kandahar to house about 60,000 refugees who had been living on Pakistani border.

- U.S. boxer Muhammad Ali met former Afghan king, Mohammad Zaher Shah. The king's grandson Duran Zahergave Ali a tour of the palace remains.
- Denmark announced that a March 6 blast that killed two German and three Danish soldiers "could have been avoided if everyone had respected the safety procedures." The event occurred near the airport in Kabul, while the team was defusing Soviet-made SA-3 anti-aircraft missiles.
- In Kabul, two Afghan children were killed when they picked up an unexploded mortar in the eastern part of the city. In a separate incident, another child in Kabul picked up a butterfly mine which blew off his hand.
- While searching for weapons near Jalalabad, U.S. soldiers were fired on by AK-47 machine guns around 7 a.m. A search of one of the three buildings in the compound turned up equipment used to produce narcotics. Documents seized showed the lab was tied to Hezb-e-Islami, a group affiliated with the warlord Gulbuddin Hekmatyar.
- Gunmen fired at the U.S. base near the central Afghan city of Terin Kot.
- Japan extended its logistics support for the U.S.-led anti-terrorism campaign in and around Afghanistan for another six months. Japan also added a transport ship (carrying bulldozers and other heavy equipment for construction of airfields) to other Japanese vessels already taking part in the campaign. However, Japan chose not to send a state-of-the-art Aegis destroyer to the region. To date, Japan had dispatched two refueling ships and three escort ships, supplying fuel and food to U.S. and British military vessels deployed mainly in the Indian Ocean.
- The U.S. State Department strongly warns U.S. citizens against travel to Afghanistan. Items of concern included military operations, landmines, banditry, armed rivalry among political and tribal groups.
- Afghan forces loyal to Gen. Abdul Rashid Dostum battled those of rival commander Gen. Atta Mohammed in Maqsood, Samangan Province. Two of Dostum's fighter's were killed and three were captured.

Wednesday, November 20 Australian Prime Minister John Howard said that Australia would begin withdrawing its 150 commandos from Afghanistan later that month.

Thursday, November 21: A large quantity of explosives was found by Afghan police in the generator room of the Sarobi Dam in Kabul, averting a possible sabotage attack. Several arrests were made.

- Explosives disposal experts from the International Security Assistance Force (ISAF) concluded that an explosion in Kabul's Microryan neighborhood was caused by a pound (0.5 kg) of explosives. Afghan authorities, however, rejected that version and stuck by their initial assessment that a rocket was responsible.
- India announced it would send 124 more busses to Afghanistan in addition to the 50 that it had already sent.

Friday, November 22: A Kurdish man from Iraq, Bohtan Akram Tawfiq Horami, carrying 10 kg (22 lb) of C-4 explosive material in his coat, was arrested in Wazir Akbar Khan, an affluent neighborhood of Kabul, where many foreigners have homes and offices. It was believed Defense Minister Mohammed Fahim was the target.

- A U.S. special forces base near Gardez, Afghanistan, about 100 km south of Kabul, was fired on with small-arms fire. There were no casualties and none of the assailants were located.
- Iran's Ambassador to Kabul Mohammad-Ebrahim Taherian met Afghan President Hamid Karzai to discuss the latest regional developments, mutual ties, and ways to promote bilateral cooperation.
- General Hilmi Akin Zorlu, the Turkish commander of the International Security Assistance Force (ISAF) in Afghanistan said he feared that a war against Iraq could lead to terrorist attacks against his forces in Kabul. He also said that he believed the 4,800-strong ISAF needed to stay for at least another two or three years.

Saturday, November 23: Nine white phosphorus rockets were fired at a U.S. base near Lwara, Afghanistan, 178 km southwest of Kabul, at about 10:30 pm. An A-10 fighter jet dropped a single bomb on the suspected launch site.

- A 107 mm rocket was fired at a U.S. base near Khost, Afghanistan. The rocket landed inside the base's outer perimeter. One of the two military trucks hit by the rocket at the Khost base was heavily damaged.
- Welcomed by Abdullah, Germany's Foreign Minister, Joschka Fischer, arrived in Kabul to visit German troops serving as international peacekeepers, to discuss security, and to discuss the transfer of International Security Assistance Force (ISAF) leadership. Fischer said Germany would send more troops to Afghanistan ahead of taking over command of international forces in Kabul. To date, there were more than 1,000 German soldiers in Kabul, together with hundreds of Dutch troops. Germany and the Netherlands were scheduled to take over command of the 5,000-strong international force, which to date comprised soldiers from 22 nations.

Monday, November 25 A 15-man U.S. special forces patrol seized a large cache of heavy weapons and armored vehicles near Bamyan. About 100 armedAfghan men fled the site as the soldiers approached the cache. Two unarmed men were briefly questioned then released.

- A U.S. special forces soldier was airlifted from a U.S. base near Spinboldak, Afghanistan, after falling and breaking his collar bone.
- A rocket was fired at a U.S. base near Shkin, about 150 miles (240 km) south of Kabul.
- A rocket-propelled grenade hit the south wall of the Spinboldak U.S. base.
- Lieutenant Commander Altug Akyuz of the International Security Assistance Force (ISAF) said there were a series of explosions near their base on the eastern outskirts of Kabul.

the blasts occurred late Monday in the vicinity of bases housing most of the troops from the 22-nation contingent.

- Hamid Karzai met with Nicholas Stern, the World Bank's senior vice-president, at Golkhana Palace. Finance Minister Ashraf Ghani Ahmadzai and Yahya Marufi, minister adviser for international affairs, were also present.

Tuesday, November 26: Several rockets slammed into the eastern edge of Kabul overnight, landing several miles from a base of the international peacekeepers.

- Forces loyal to Gen. Abdul Rashid Dostum clashed with those of Gen. Atta Mohammed in Faryab Province, Afghanistan.
- A rocket was launched from a truck near the town of Lwara into a U.S. base. At least three men were seen fleeing in the vehicle and were pursued by U.S. attack helicopters until the truck crossed the border into Pakistan. A total of 53 attacks were reported against U.S. forces in Afghanistan in November. The tally of incidents, which included mines, direct fire, mortar or rocket attacks on U.S. forces, was up from 49 in September and 51 in October.
- Afghan authorities released 87 Pakistani prisoners suspected of fighting alongside the formerTaliban government. The men were handed over to officials at Pakistan's embassy in Kabul and, in the presence of several delegates from the International Committee of the Red Cross, placed on a bus destined for the Pakistan border. To date, an estimated 600 Pakistanis were still jailed in Afghanistan.

Wednesday, November 27: A New Zealand telecoms company Argent Networks won a $4.5 million contract to develop cellular and internet services in Afghanistan. Argent will develop a billing system for the GSM mobile network set up in June by the Afghan Wireless Communication Company, a joint venture between Telephone Systems International and the Afghan Ministry of Communications.

- The U.N. Security Council voted unanimously to extend the International Security Assistance Force (ISAF) in Afghanistanfor a year beyond December 20 with Germany and the Netherlands taking over its command for six months. To date, the force was 4,800 strong and operated only in Kabul. Separate from ISAF, about 9,000 U.S. troops were in Afghanistan to date as part of a U.S.-led international coalition involved in hunting for al-Qaeda and Taliban fighters.
- While riding in a convoy about 4 miles (6 km) east of Gardez, Afghanistan, a sniper shot and wounded a U.S. Special Forces soldier in the leg.

Thursday, November 28: To date, U.N.-monitored disarmament commissions collected more than 6,000 small arms and 30 tanks in the northeast ofAfghanistan since the start of the disarmament plan on November 10. The commissions covered the provinces of Baghlan, Badakhshan, Kunduz and Takhar.

Friday, November 29: Australia announced it would contribute $1 million towards a project to help Afghanistan restore production of wheat and maize.

- U.S. General Tommy Franks visited U.S. troops stationed at Bagram, Afghanistan.
- Two rockets were fired at the U.S. base near Khost, about 100 miles (160 km) south of Kabul, Afghanistan.

Saturday, November 30: In Moscow, Afghan foreign minister, Abdullah, and his Russian counterpart, Igor Ivanov, held talks focusing on security issues. Russia had provided economic and food aid to Afghanistan during 2002, and Ivanov committed to increasing that aid. The two officials also spent much of their time discussing the growing problem of illegal drug smuggling.

== December ==
Sunday, December 1: A group of armed Afghans patrolling outside Shindand air base stopped another group of armed Afghans on the roadside. The second group then fired at the patrol. U.S. soldiers who were inside the air base, also came under fire. They returned fire, then called for air support while making their escape. A B-52 bomber dropped seven 2,000-pound laser-guided bombs, killing at least seven.

- Unidentified attackers fired four rockets at a U.S.-controlled airport in the eastern city of Khost, Afghanistan.
- Japan's defense minister Shigeru Ishiba denied that its government had decided to send a high-tech Aegis destroyer to back up U.S. military action in Afghanistan.
- Afghan commander Amanullah Khan launched an attack on positions held by the governor of Herat Province, Ismail Khan, in the Zeer Koh area six miles from Shindand air base. Up to 13 people were feared dead and dozens wounded.

Monday, December 2: Fierce clashes between forces of Amanullah Khan and Ismail Khan resumed in western Afghanistan.

- Three people were killed and five wounded in a gun battle between police and fighters of a military commander in the southern city of Kandahar, Afghanistan.
- U.S. special forces based in Lwara, near Khost, called in AH-64 Apache attack helicopter support to help chase five people seen moving in the vicinity of the base. A small team of soldiers discovered five rockets in the area where the suspects had been seen and one person was detained for questioning. The five suspects fled into a building two miles away.
- U.S. special forces near Jalalabad came under fire from 10 people using automatic weapons who then fled for cover in nearby hills. A-10 gunships were called in to drop flares in the target area.

Tuesday, December 10: A second prisoner died (the first one dying on December 3) at the makeshift prison in the United States compound at an Afghan base north of Kabul. Later, the autopsies would label the deaths as homicides.

Wednesday, December 11: U.S. forces fire mortars near the Pakistani border after coming under rocket attack.

Thursday, December 12: The Afghan Cable Center in Jalalabad, which had been broadcasting more than 20 foreign television channels, was closed down by a special decision of the Afghanistan Supreme Court presided over by chief justice Mowlawi Fazl Hadi Shinwari.

Tuesday, December 17: A grenade was thrown into a jeep carrying two U.S. Special Forces soldiers driving through Kabul, Afghanistan. One soldier suffered an eye injury and the other a leg injury. Their Afghan interpreter also was injured. Amir Mohammad was later taken into custody for the crime. He revealed that he had received terror training at a camp inside Afghanistan. Allegedly, he and about a dozen other men trained for a week at a base six miles from the border with Pakistan. About a dozen teachers taught the students how to use guns and bombs. Five students then traveled to Kabul looking for American targets.

Friday, December 20: A U.S. soldier is killed during a gunfight in eastern Afghanistan. The same day, another U.S. soldier is injured by a rocket attack.

Friday, December 27: In the Gardez District of Afghanistan, five people were killed and six wounded when guests at a wedding party fired a rocket propelled grenade into the air, only to have it land nearby and explode.

Sunday, December 29: A Pakistani border guard shot and wounded a U.S. soldier in the head in eastern Afghanistan's Paktika province, just a few hundred yards from Pakistan's border. The shooting prompted U.S. forces to call in an airstrike on a building where the guard was believed hiding. Pakistan claimed the building was on its side of the border, but the Americans claimed it was on the Afghan side. The soldier was evacuated to the U.S. military's medical center in Landstuhl, Germany, then transferred to a nearby German hospital for more specific neurological treatment, and a week later flown home to the United States. The border guard was taken into custody. The situation grew more tense when Pakistan dispatched extra troops to the border after the United States said it reserved the right to cross into Pakistan in hot pursuit of enemy fighters fleeing from Afghanistan.

- A second U.S. soldier arrived at Landstuhl, Germany after being shot in the head the day before at Kandahar U.S. base, but not from hostile fire.
