= 2007 in Afghanistan =

- Decades: 1980s; 1990s; 2000s; 2010s; 2020s
- See also: Other events of 2007; List of years in Afghanistan

Events from the year 2007 in Afghanistan.

== Incumbents ==
- President: Hamid Karzai
- First Vice President: Ahmad Zia Massoud
- Second Vice President: Karim Khalili
- Chief Justice: Abdul Salam Azimi

== January ==
- January 11 - In the ongoing Operation Mountain Fury, NATO forces kill as many as 150 Taliban militants in Afghanistan's Paktika province.
- January 31 - A terror plot is foiled in the UK, where nine people are arrested in Birmingham on suspicion of planning the kidnap and filmed execution of a British Muslim soldier. The alleged plot intended to pressure Prime Minister Tony Blair into withdrawing British troops from Afghanistan and Iraq.

== February ==
- February 14 - The United States redeploys the 173rd Airborne Brigade to Afghanistan to prepare for an anticipated spring offensive by the Taliban.
- February 14 - The foreign ministers of China, India and Russia meet in New Delhi, India to discuss greater cooperation among the three Asian countries on issues including terrorism, drug trafficking and Afghanistan.
- February 16 - Abdul Tawala Ibn Ali Alishtari is charged in New York City with financing terrorism and material support of terrorism for allegedly passing on money for a training camp in Afghanistan.
- February 16 - The President of Afghanistan Hamid Karzai meets with the Prime Minister of Italy Romano Prodi to discuss Italian contributions to the fight against the Taliban and drug traffickers in Afghanistan.
- February 18 - Eight U.S. troops are killed and 14 wounded in a helicopter crash in south-eastern Afghanistan, the U.S.-led coalition has said.
- February 18 - Police in Pakistan detain 36 people, mainly Afghan refugees, over a suicide bombing inside a Quetta courtroom that killed a judge and 15 other people.
- February 22 - Vice-President of the United States Dick Cheney arrives in Australia to discuss issues including Iraq, Afghanistan and the detention of David Hicks with the Australian government. Upon arrival he is greeted by violent demonstrations.
- February 26 - Vice President of the United States Dick Cheney makes surprise visits to Pakistan and Afghanistan to encourage President of Pakistan Pervez Musharraf and President of Afghanistan Hamid Karzai to increase border security between the two countries and to take further action against the Taliban and al-Qaeda.
- February 26 - United Kingdom Secretary of State for Defence Des Browne announces the deployment of an additional 1,400 troops to Afghanistan.

== March ==
- March 1 - Pakistani authorities capture Mullah Obaidullah Akhund, a former Defense Minister of Afghanistan under the Taliban.
- March 4 - War in Afghanistan (2001–14)
  - Taliban insurgency: Two British soldiers serving with the NATO International Security Assistance Force are killed in Helmand province during clashes with Taliban forces.
  - U.S. troops open fire after a suicide bomb attack on a convoy and kill as many as 19 civilians and injured about 35 in the shootings on the main road linking Jalalabad with the Pakistan border. Local people protest at the soldiers' actions.
- March 6 - NATO-led forces launch Operation Achilles against the Taliban in Helmand province.
- March 10 - President George W. Bush approves 8,200 more United States troops for Iraq and Afghanistan.
- March 13 - Spanish police arrest Brian David Anderson, a Canadian citizen, in Madrid, on behalf of the U.S. government, for allegedly engaging in fraud and funding a terrorist camp in Afghanistan.
- March 19 - Daniele Mastrogiacomo, an Italian journalist working for La Repubblica, is set free by the Taliban. He had been kidnapped in the Afghan province of Helmand on March 6.
- March 23 - War in Afghanistan (2001–14)
  - A Taliban attack on a convoy carrying supplies to foreign troops in southern Afghanistan kills 17 Afghan security guards and drivers.
  - US Marines accused of shooting and killing civilians after a suicide bombing in Afghanistan are under investigation and their unit has been shipped out of the country.
- March 27 - United States District Court Judge Thomas Hogan dismisses a case of alleged torture against former United States Secretary of Defense Donald Rumsfeld brought by nine former prisoners in Iraq and Afghanistan.

== April ==
- April 3 - The 14th annual summit of the South Asian Association for Regional Cooperation (SAARC) begins in New Delhi, India, and Afghanistan becomes its 8th member.
- April 8 - War in Afghanistan (2001–2021)
  - Pope Benedict laments the violence in Darfur, the Democratic Republic of Congo, Zimbabwe, Somalia, Afghanistan, and the Middle East, stating, "nothing positive is happening in Iraq" in his Easter homily.
  - Seven NATO soldiers die as a result of car bombings in southern Afghanistan as it conducts an offensive against the Taliban.
  - The Taliban claims it has killed an Afghan reporter abducted with Daniele Mastrogiacomo because the government of Afghanistan refused to meet ransom demands.
- April 10 - Australian Prime Minister John Howard announces that 300 soldiers from the Australian Special Air Service Regiment will be sent to Orūzgān Province, Afghanistan to combat the Taliban.
- April 11 - The United States Secretary of Defense Robert M. Gates meets with the Defense Ministers of the United Kingdom, Australia, Canada, the Netherlands and Denmark as well as officials from Estonia and Romania to discuss progress in Afghanistan in expectation of a Taliban offensive. Two Canadian soldiers are killed when a roadside bomb explodes.
- April 11 - The United States extends the tour of duty for troops in Iraq and Afghanistan from a year to 15 months.
- April 14 - A suicide bomber kills 8 people in the Khost Province of Afghanistan.
- April 16 - At least ten Afghan police die in a suicide bombing in Kunduz in northeastern Afghanistan.
- April 17 - Four Nepalese United Nations workers and their driver are killed in a roadside bombing in Kandahar, Afghanistan.
- April 19 - An Amnesty International report claims that the attacks on Afghan civilians by the Taliban are widespread and systematic.
- April 24 - Kevin Tillman, brother of former American football player Pat Tillman, who was killed by friendly fire in Afghanistan, accuses the U.S. military of manipulating his death during testimony to the U.S. Congress.
- April 30 - The US-led Coalition claims to have killed scores of Taliban forces in Afghanistan.

== May ==
- May 2 - Gunmen in Afghanistan kill Abdul Sabur Farid, a member of the House of Elders and former Prime Minister.
- May 6 - Eight Afghan police are killed in Farah Province in a clash with the Taliban in which at least 17 insurgents are killed or injured.
- May 12 - After being tracked by the ISA and JSOC, operators from C squadron Special Boat Service inserted by an RAF Chinook and killed the Taliban leader Mullah Dadullah in Helmand province during a raid on a compound near Bahram Chah where his associates were meeting, 4 SBS operators were wounded.
- May 15 - Lt. Gen. Douglas Lute has been chosen to be President Bush's "war czar," overseeing the wars in Iraq and Afghanistan.
- May 19 - Three German soldiers are killed with four civilians in a suicide bombing in Kunduz in northern Afghanistan.
- May 20 - A suicide bomber kills at least 10 people and injures 32 people in Gardez, the capital of Afghanistan's Paktia Province.
- May 24 - The United States House of Representatives approves a US$100 billion bill to fund the US war effort in Iraq and Afghanistan without a timetable for the withdrawal of troops from Iraq.
- May 30 - A CH-47 Chinook helicopter on a NATO mission in Helmand Province, southern Afghanistan, is shot down killing all seven service personnel (5 American, 1 Canadian and 1 British) aboard. Taliban fighters claim responsibility for the attack.

== June ==
- June 4 - A military judge dismisses terrorism-related charges against a Canadian Guantanamo Bay detainee charged with killing a United States Army soldier in Afghanistan.
- June 10 - President of Afghanistan Hamid Karzai escapes an apparent assassination attempt.
- June 12 - Afghan officials claim that seven members of the Afghan police were killed by Coalition air forces in a friendly fire incident.
- June 17 - Air strikes in Afghanistan on a suspected Al Qaeda headquarters kill several militants as well as civilians including children.
- June 17 - At least 35 people die in Kabul, Afghanistan, as the result of a bombing of a police bus.
- June 19 - BBC News released an article on June 19, 2007, interviewing six villagers of Asad Khyl in the north of Afghanistan where many homes had been destroyed by the Taliban in the civil war fought in the 1990s. One of the villagers said that security in their village had "improved a bit" but that living conditions had not changed much. Another suggested that if the Taliban were invited to join a broad-based national government, there would be no need for foreign troops in the country at all. Another described Hamid Karzai as a puppet of the United States. Worsened corruption, poverty, and high inflation were also stated as key problems.
- June 29 - Between 50 and 80 civilians are killed by Air Strikes on the village of Hyderabad, in the Province of Hellmand in southern Afghanistan.

== July ==
- July 2 - Corporal Bill Henry "Willie" Apiata of the Special Air Service of New Zealand is awarded the Victoria Cross for bravery under fire in Afghanistan in 2004.
- July 4 - Six Canadian soldiers were killed by a roadside bomb in the Panjwaii district.
- July 7 - The Government of Afghanistan states that it will investigate claims that United States and NATO air strikes caused heavy civilian casualties in Farah Province and Kunar Province.
- July 10 - At least 17 civilians have been killed in a suicide bombing in Uruzgan Province, At least 30 people were wounded, including seven NATO troops.
- July 12 - Six Afghan policemen are killed by an improvised explosive device in the Khost Province. Another IED kills two civilians in the Paktika Province.
- July 14 - At least 24 Pakistani soldiers are killed by a suicide attack by militants on a convoy in Waziristan near the Afghanistan border.
- July 20 - Taliban insurgents stop a bus in Afghanistan and kidnap some of the passengers including South Koreans.
- July 21 - The Taliban threatens to kill 18 South Koreans taken hostage in Afghanistan, prompting the government in Seoul to confirm an earlier plan to withdraw its troops from the country by the end of the year. Separately, the Taliban claims that it has executed two German hostages. However, the Afghan government disputes the claim, stating that one died of a heart attack and the other is still alive.
- July 23 - Approximately 60 Taliban and six North Atlantic Treaty Organization (NATO) troops die in two days of heavy fighting.
- July 23 - Former King of Afghanistan Mohammed Zahir Shah dies after prolonged illness.
- July 25 - 8 of the 23 South Koreans held hostage by the Taliban in Afghanistan are released, while one of the hostages is executed. The Taliban gives further warning that the remaining hostages will be killed.
- July 26 - United States-led troops kill more than 50 insurgents in the Helmand province of Afghanistan.
- July 27 - Three soldiers in the NATO-led International Security Assistance Force are killed.
- July 28 - A British soldier is killed by a rocket attack in the Helmand Province.
- July 30 - An Afghan governor asks the Taliban to extend Monday's deadline for the lives of 22 South Koreans, after militants warned the Afghan government to release 23 of its captured fighters or else hostages will die. The Taliban later executes a hostage.

== August ==
- August 4 - Ten pro-Taliban militants and four Pakistan Army soldiers are killed in a clash in North Waziristan near the Afghanistan border. In another incident, a suicide car bomber kills six in Parachinar, North West Frontier Province in Pakistan.
- August 5 - The President of the United States George W. Bush meets with the President of Afghanistan Hamid Karzai at Camp David to discuss the security of Afghanistan.
- August 7 - The Taliban attacks Firebase Anaconda in Uruzgan province but is repulsed by a joint force of Afghan fighters and United States Army forces with 20 militants killed.
- August 7 - Bangladesh security officials arrest 24 suspected militants at Shahjalal International Airport en route to Kabul, Afghanistan.
- August 9 - The President of Pakistan General Pervez Musharraf pulls out of a meeting with the President of Afghanistan Hamid Karzai and tribal leaders in Kabul over fighting the Taliban. He is also resisting pressure to institute a state of emergency, insisting that the planned parliamentary election in October must proceed as scheduled.
- August 11 - War in Afghanistan (2001–14)
  - The Taliban attacks Firebase Anaconda in Uruzgan province for the third time in a week suffering casualties. The Taliban also launches unsuccessful attacks in Helmand and Kandahar provinces.
  - The Taliban claims to have released two South Korean hostages but local and national officials cannot confirm the claims.
- August 12 - A clash between Taliban militants and Afghan security forces in Kandahar province results in nine militants dead with five police dying in a bomb.
- August 14 - A Polish soldier is killed by Taliban near Gardez, Afghanistan. It is the first Polish casualty in the War in Afghanistan.
- August 14 - The President of Iran Mahmoud Ahmadinejad visits Afghanistan on the first leg of a Central Asian tour before visiting the Shanghai Cooperation Organisation meeting in Bishkek.
- August 15 - War in Afghanistan (2001–14)
  - Three Germans are killed by a bomb attack near Kabul.
  - United States and Afghan forces start a new offensive in Tora Bora.
- August 16 - Eight civilians including a pregnant women and a baby died when Polish soldiers shelled the village of Nangar Khel where a wedding celebration was taking place. Seven Polish soldiers have been charged with war crimes for allegedly opened fire in revenge.
- August 17 - A dozen Taliban die in an attempted ambush of a joint patrol of Afghan police and Coalition troops in Helmand province.
- August 18 - War in Afghanistan (2001–14)
  - A suicide bomber kills at least 15 people in the southern Kandahar province.
  - A female German aid worker is taken captive at gunpoint in Kabul.
- August 19 - A German woman taken hostage yesterday in Kabul, Afghanistan is found during a police raid on a house. Multiple abductors arrested.
- August 22 - War in Afghanistan (2001–14)
  - Two Canadian Army soldiers are killed and a Radio Canada journalist injured in an explosion.
  - A German engineer kidnapped by the Taliban pleads for help on Afghan television.
- August 24 - Three British Army soldiers die in Afghanistan in a suspected friendly fire incident.
- August 24 - At least four Pakistan Army soldiers die in a suicide bomber attack on a military convoy near Miranshah, the main city of North Waziristan near the Afghan border.
- August 28 - At least 100 Taliban fighters and one Afghan National Army soldier were killed in several skirmishes in Shah Wali Kot district in Kandahar province.
- August 30 - The Taliban releases the remaining South Korean hostages.
- August 30 - Scores of Pakistani soldiers have gone missing near the Afghanistan border, amid claims from pro-Taleban militants that they have kidnapped the troops.
- August 31 - War in Afghanistan (2001–14)
  - At least two people are killed and ten others injured by a suicide bomb at the Kabul International Airport in Afghanistan.
  - At least ten civilians are killed and several more injured in Kunar Province as Taliban rockets aimed at a US military base hit a nearby village.
  - Nearly two dozen Afghan militants die in heavy fighting in Helmand province.

== September ==
- September 2 - Scores of Taliban are killed in heavy fighting in the Kandahar and Arghandab regions of Afghanistan.
- September 2 - The 19 freed hostages return to South Korea.
- September 5 - Afghan and U.S led coalition forces kill 20 insurgents while two Afghan policeman die in a bomb attack.
- September 9 - The President of Afghanistan Hamid Karzai is forced to cut short a speech in Kabul after gunfire is heard outside.
- September 11 - The Prime Minister of Canada Stephen Harper rules out sending further troops to Afghanistan.
- September 12 - Airstrikes and Afghan army gunfire kills more than 45 Taliban insurgents on the first day of Ramadan.
- September 15 - The Washington Post reports that the NATO-led Coalition Force in Afghanistan intercepted a shipment of Iranian arms intended for the Taliban.
- September 19 - Coalition forces led by the British Army launch a major offensive in Helmand province.
- September 20 - Al Qaeda's Deputy Leader Ayman al-Zawahri claims that the United States is being defeated in Iraq, Afghanistan, Somalia and North Africa.
- September 21 - War in Afghanistan (2001–14)
  - NATO's alliance forces say that its warplanes killed an unspecified number of civilians during a battle with Taliban forces.
  - A suicide bomber attacks a convoy of soldiers killing a French soldier and several Afghans.
- September 24 - Operators from C squadron SBS and the Italian SOF unit Col Moschin rescued two Italian intelligence agents who were kidnapped by the Taliban in Herat province near Farah, they had been kidnapped 2 days before. Col Moschin parachuted onto a drop zone and marched overnight to surround the target compound, whilst the SBS were standing by in Lynx and Chinook helicopters to provide cut off groups in-case the insurgents attempted to escape, whilst a US Predator drone supported the British and Italians. The insurgents brought the hostages out of the compound and loaded them into vehicles before the Italians were in position to rescue them, the SBS closed in on the vehicles: aerial snipers using M82A1 antimaterial rifles forced the vehicles to stop. A Chinook dropped off more than a dozen SBS operators who engaged the Taliban who were disembarking the vehicles, 8 Taliban insurgents were killed and the hostages rescued, however one died on gunshot wounds.
- September 26 - The United States Secretary of Defense Robert Gates asks for US$190 billion to cover the cost of the war in Iraq and war in Afghanistan during 2008.
- September 27 - Four employees of the International Red Cross, including two foreigners, are abducted in Afghanistan's Wardak province.

== October ==
- October 2 - A suicide bomber blows himself up near a bus carrying policemen killing at least 11 in Kabul.
- October 6 - A suicide bomb attack on a United States convoy in Kabul kills a U.S. soldier and five civilians.
- October 7 - Sixteen militants fighting under wanted Uzbek warlord Tahir Yuldash are killed in eastern Afghanistan.
- October 8 - Australia suffers its first combat casualty in Afghanistan following the explosion of a bomb in the southern province of Orūzgān.
- October 9 - The United States Supreme Court dismisses the case of the German citizen Khalid El-Masri who accuses the CIA of abducting him to a secret prison in Afghanistan where he claims he was tortured. The US government had argued that a public trial would reveal state secrets.
- October 10 - Taliban frees one German and four Afghan hostages kidnapped in mid-July.
- October 12 - The Prime Minister of Canada Stephen Harper appoints a five-member advisory committee on Afghanistan to be chaired by John Manley of the opposition Liberal Party of Canada.
- October 22 - The President of the United States George W. Bush asks the United States Congress for US$189.3 billion to fund the wars in Iraq and Afghanistan.
- October 22 - Georgia and Slovakia offer to send troops to support the Australian/Dutch taskforce in the south of the Afghanistan as the Dutch government is under pressure to reduce troops.
- October 27 - War in Afghanistan (2001–14)
  - United States led coalition forces kill 80 Taliban fighters outside Musa Qala in Helmand province.
  - A suicide bomber explodes a bomb outside a United States base in eastern Afghanistan killing four Afghan soldiers and a civilian.
  - Denmark deployed its Leopard 2A5 DKs in support of operations in southern Afghanistan. The Danish tank unit, drawn from the first battalion of the Jydske Dragonregiment (Jutland Dragoons Regiment), was equipped with three tanks and one M113 armoured personnel carrier, with an armoured recovery vehicle and another tank kept in reserve.

== November ==
- November 6 - At least 35 people are killed and dozens more wounded in a suicide bombing in northern Afghanistan, officials say.
- November 7 - French President Nicolas Sarkozy pledges friendship between France and the United States and a renewed alliance on the war in Afghanistan and against Iran's nuclear program in a speech to a joint meeting of the U.S. Congress.
- November 10 - Six American forces serving under NATO's International Security Assistance Force are killed in an insurgent ambush while patrolling in eastern Afghanistan.
- November 12 - The United States Army kills 15 insurgents and three civilians in the Helmand Province.
- November 17 - Two NATO Canadian soldiers and an interpreter are killed by a roadside bomb in Panjawi, Kandahar province. Three more soldiers are wounded.
- November 19 - A suicide bomber kills seven people in the Nimruz Province of Afghanistan, including the son of governor Ghulam Dastageer.
- November 24 - At least six people, most of them children, are killed by a suicide bomber in Paghman, Afghanistan.

== December ==
- December 5 - A suicide bomber rams a car into a minibus containing Afghan soldiers on a highway south of Kabul. Thirteen, including six Afghan soldiers, are killed in the incident.
- December 9 - Taliban fighters in Afghanistan have pulled back to take up new positions defending the town of Musa Qala during a battle with the Afghan National Army and the International Security Assistance Force.

== Deaths ==
- May 3: Abdul Sabur Farid Kuhestani, 54/55, legislator and Prime Minister (1992), assassination by gunshot.
- May 12: Mullah Dadullah, 41, Taliban military commander, shot.
- June 6: Zakia Zaki, 35, director of Radio Peace, shot.
- July 23: Mohammed Zahir Shah, 92, last king.
- November 6: Hajji Muhammad Arif Zarif, politician and businessman, bomb blast injuries.
- November 6: Sayed Mustafa Kazemi, c.45, politician, former commerce minister, bomb blast injuries.
- December 30: Abdul Razzak, 68, Guantanamo Bay detainee, cancer.
