= 2006 in Afghanistan =

- Decades: 1980s; 1990s; 2000s; 2010s; 2020s
- See also: Other events of 2006; List of years in Afghanistan

The following lists events that happened during 2006 in Afghanistan.

See also: Coalition combat operations in Afghanistan in 2006, and Timeline of the War in Afghanistan (2001–present).

== Incumbents ==
- President: Hamid Karzai
- First Vice President: Ahmad Zia Massoud
- Second Vice President: Karim Khalili
- Chief Justice: Faisal Ahmad Shinwari then Abdul Salam Azimi

== January ==
- In 2006, the U.S. Foreign Policy magazine and the U.S.-based "Fund for Peace" think-tank ranked Afghanistan in 10th place on their "failed state index". The authors said their index was based on "tens of thousands of articles" from various sources that they had gathered over several months in 2005. The score was based on 12 criteria that included: "uneven economic development along group lines", "legacy of vengeance – seeking group grievance", "widespread violation of human rights", "rise of factionalised elites", and "intervention of other states or external actors".
- January 13: Damadola airstrike by US in Pakistan.

== February ==
- February 1: The Afghanistan Compact is developed, establishing a framework of international cooperation with Afghanistan.
- February 3: Taliban fighters fire RPGs at the district governor's building in Musa Qala, killing the district governor in the explosion.

== March ==
- March 6: In 2006, Pakistani President Pervez Musharraf told President Bush that Pakistan had to deal with a total of over 30,000 fighters crossing from Afghanistan to Pakistan. He also said Pakistan had more soldiers near the Afghanistan-Pakistan border, even when ISAF and Afghan forces in the border region are combined.
- March 29: Battle of Lashkagar. Taliban fighters attack a NATO base.

== April ==
- Beginning of the 2006 Taliban offensive.
- The 2006 Dutch/Australian Offensive began in late April and lasted until July 16. It was one of the largest offensives launched by the coalition in 2006 and resulted in over 300 Taliban fighters killed and the capture of the Chora Valley as well as the Baluchi areas.

== May ==
- May 15: Operation Mountain Thrust is launched, the largest offensive since the fall of the Taliban regime in late 2001.
- May 29: According to American website The Spokesman-Review Afghanistan faced "a mounting threat from armed Taliban fighters in the countryside," a US military truck that was part of a convoy in Kabul lost control and plowed into twelve civilian vehicles, killing one and injuring six people. The surrounding crowd got angry and a riot arose, lasting all day ending with 20 dead and 160 injured. When stone-throwing and gunfire had come from a crowd of some 400 men, the US troops had used their weapons "to defend themselves" while leaving the scene, a US military spokesman said. A correspondent for the Financial Times in Kabul suggested that this was the outbreak of "a ground swell of resentment" and "growing hostility to foreigners" that had been growing and building since 2004, and may also have been triggered by a US air strike a week earlier in southern Afghanistan killing 30 civilians, where she assumed that "the Taliban had been sheltering in civilian houses".

== June ==
- June 27: A 16-man British special forces team consisting mostly of marines and soldiers from C squadron SBS and members of the SRR carried out Operation Ilois to capture 4 Taliban leaders in compounds on the outskirts of Sangin at 3am. After capturing them, they were returning to their Land Rover vehicles when the team was ambushed by an estimated 60-70 Taliban fighters whilst returning to their base, starting a firefight: one UKSF Land Rover was destroyed by a RPG and one SBS operator was seriously injured, the team took cover in an irrigation ditch and requested assistance whilst holding off against the Taliban force. The Helmand Battle Group had not been informed of the operation until it went wrong; a QRF made up of a platoon of Gurkhas responded but ran into another insurgent ambush. The firefight lasted from 1 to 3 hours until a Gurkha Platoon fought their way through to them, twice, with close air support from 2 Apaches, a U.S. A-10 Thunderbolt and 2 Harrier GR7s. break contact and return to the closest FOB; 2 of the 4 Taliban leaders were killed in the firefight whilst the other 2 escaped in the chaos. Upon reaching the FOB it was discovered that Captain David Patten, SRR, and Sergeant Paul Bartlett, SBS were missing - one was helping wounded out of a vehicle when he was shot and assumed killed, whilst the second went missing during the firefight. A company from the Parachute Regiment in an RAF Chinook took off to find them, a pair of Apaches spotted the bodies and the Paras recovered them. One SBS commando was awarded the Military Cross for his actions in the ambush.

== July ==
- July: Battle of Panjwaii between Canadian NATO forces and the Taliban. This battle consists of two phases, one from July–August, and the other September through October 2006.
- July 31: The ISAF expanded its area of operation with the inclusion of 6 southern provinces: Daykundi, Helmand, Kandahar, Nimroz, Uruzgan and Zabul.

== September ==
- September 2: Canadians launch Operation Medusa.
- September 6: Kajaki Dam incident in which seven soldiers were injured and one killed after their patrol strayed into a soviet minefield.
- September 16: Operation Mountain Fury.
- End of the 2006 Taliban offensive.

== October ==
- 2006 German troops controversy

== November ==
In November 2006, the U.N. Security Council warned that Afghanistan may become a failed state due to increased Taliban violence, growing illegal drug production, and fragile state institutions. In 2006, Afghanistan was rated 10th on the failed states index, up from 11th in 2005. From 2005 to 2006, the number of suicide attacks, direct fire attacks, and improvised explosive devices all increased. Intelligence documents declassified in 2006 suggested that Al Qaeda, Taliban, Haqqani Network and Hezb-i-Islami sanctuaries had by then increased fourfold in Afghanistan. The campaign in Afghanistan successfully unseated the Taliban from power, but has been significantly less successful at achieving the primary policy goal of ensuring that Al-Qaeda can no longer operate in Afghanistan.

== December ==
- December 3: In response to the problems the Canadian forces faced on Operation Medusa, the Leopard C2 tanks of B Squadron of Lord Strathcona's Horse were deployed to Kandahar in December 2006
