= Mixon =

Mixon may refer to:

== Places ==
- Mixon, Texas, an unincorporated community in northern Cherokee County, Texas, United States
- Mixon Rocks, a rock outcrop in Antarctica
- The Mixon Rock, south of Selsey Bill, is a limestone outcrop formed around 45 million years ago during the Eocene period.

== People with the surname ==
- Abdul Tawala Ibn Ali Alishtari, also known as Michael Mixon
- Autry DeWalt Mixon, Jr., better known as Junior Walker (1931-1995), American musician
- Benjamin R. Mixon (born 1953), American army officer
- Danny Mixon (1949–2026), American jazz pianist
- Jamal Mixon (born 1983), American actor
- Jerod Mixon (born 1981), American actor
- Joe Mixon (born 1996), American football player
- Katy Mixon (born 1981), American actress
- Kenny Mixon (born 1975), American football player
- Laura J. Mixon, American author
- Lovelle Mixon (1983?-2009), American felon, perpetrator of 2009 Oakland CA police shootout
- Mick Mixon, American radio announcer
- Myron Mixon (born 1962), American barbecue chef
- Tim Mixon (born 1984), American football player

== See also ==
- Mixson, surname
