= Zarif =

Zarif (Persian: ظریف, lit. '"delicate"') is a surname of Arabic origin meaning “elegant”. Notable people with the surname include:

- Mohammad Javad Zarif (born c. 1960), Iranian former foreign minister
- Houshang Zarif (1938–2020), Iranian master musician and renowned tar player
- Farhad Zarif (born 1983), Iranian volleyball player
- Munawar Zarif (1940–1976), Pakistani comedian and film actor
- Farid Zarif (born 1951), United Nations Secretary-General Ban Ki-moon's Special Representative
- Omar Zarif (born 1978), Argentine football midfielder
- Jorge Zarif (born 1992), Brazilian sailor
- Hajji Muhammad Arif Zarif (1942–2007), Afghan politician
