= Tawala =

Tawala may be,

- Tawala language
- Abdul Tawala Ibn Ali Alishtari
