= Baghlan Sugar Factory =

Sugar factory based in Baghlan province of Afghanistan

- Built: 1938
- Location: Baghlan Province, Afghanistan
- Coordinates: 36°7′30″N 68°40′48″E
- Industry: Sugar

The Baghlan Sugar Factory is a sugar refinery based in Baghlan Province of Afghanistan. The refinery was established in 1938. It currently has around 1,000 workers and can produce more 2,000 tons of sugar from sugar beets annually or 50,000 kg (110,000 lb) on daily basis.

== See also ==
- Economy of Afghanistan
- 2007 Baghlan sugar factory bombing
