= 2005 in Afghanistan =

- Decades: 1980s; 1990s; 2000s; 2010s; 2020s
- See also: Other events of 2005; List of years in Afghanistan

The following lists events that happened during 2005 in Afghanistan.

== Incumbents ==
- President: Hamid Karzai
- First Vice President: Ahmad Zia Massoud
- Second Vice President: Karim Khalili
- Chief Justice: Faisal Ahmad Shinwari

== February ==
In February 2005, U.S. Senator John McCain called for the establishment of permanent U.S. military bases in Afghanistan, saying such bases would be "for the good of the American people, because of the long-term security interests we have in the region".

He made the remarks while visiting Afghan President Hamid Karzai in Kabul as part of a five-member, bi-partisan Senate delegation travelling through the region for talks on security issues. The same delegation also included then-Senator Hillary Clinton, who later became U.S. Secretary of State.

== March ==
- Mid-March – U.S. Joint Chiefs of Staff Chairman General Richard Myers told reporters in Kabul that the U.S. Defense Department was studying the feasibility of such permanent military bases. At the end of March, the U.S. military announced that it was spending $83 million on its two main air bases in Afghanistan, Bagram Air Base north of Kabul and Kandahar Air Field in the south of the country.

== April ==
- April – During a surprise visit to Kabul by U.S. Defense Secretary Donald Rumsfeld, Afghan President Hamid Karzai hinted at a possible permanent U.S. military presence in Afghanistan, saying he had also discussed the matter with President Bush. Rumsfeld refused to say whether the U.S. wanted permanent American military bases in Afghanistan, saying the final decision would come from the White House.

== May ==
- May – Riots and protests that had started over a false report in Newsweek of U.S. interrogators desecrating the Koran and turned into the biggest anti-U.S. protests in Afghanistan since the 2001 invasion included demands that the Kabul government reject U.S. intentions to create a permanent military presence in Afghanistan.

== June ==
- June 27 – The U.S.-led Operation Red Wings began.
