= Raid on Hazar Qadam =

2002 raid by US military

On January 24, 2002, the American military launched an overnight raid against a "large munitions cache" north of Kandahar, as part of its invasion of Afghanistan, claiming that it was a weapons stockpile of the Taliban or al-Qaeda. However, it was later discovered that the target was a compound that the United States had asked to collect weapons for the government of Hamid Karzai, and that the dead and captured were all backers of the American invasion.

== Battle ==
While we regret the loss of life, we are confident that the U.S. forces did their jobs to the best of their abilities, using the best information available to them in a very difficult situation.

— Department of Defense Press Release, February 21, 2002

The 101st Airborne was reportedly "spoiling for a fight", when they were given the opportunity to launch an overnight helicopter-borne assault against a school, which they characterized as "two adjacent compounds" in Hazar Qadam, 60 miles north of Kandahar.

The United States found 400 60mm mortar rounds, 300 RPG rounds, 300 100mm rockets, thousands of fuses, 250 automatic grenade launcher rounds and more than 500,000 individual rounds for small arms, that had been collected by their Afghan allies, and called in an AC-130 gunship to destroy the cache.

The resulting firefight at the weapons depot killed 21 Afghans, and 27 others were captured and taken to Camp Rhino as prisoners. Journalist Mark Mazzetti put the body count at over 40. One American was wounded in the ankle, making him the first American military casualty since Nathan Chapman was the first soldier killed.

== Aftermath ==
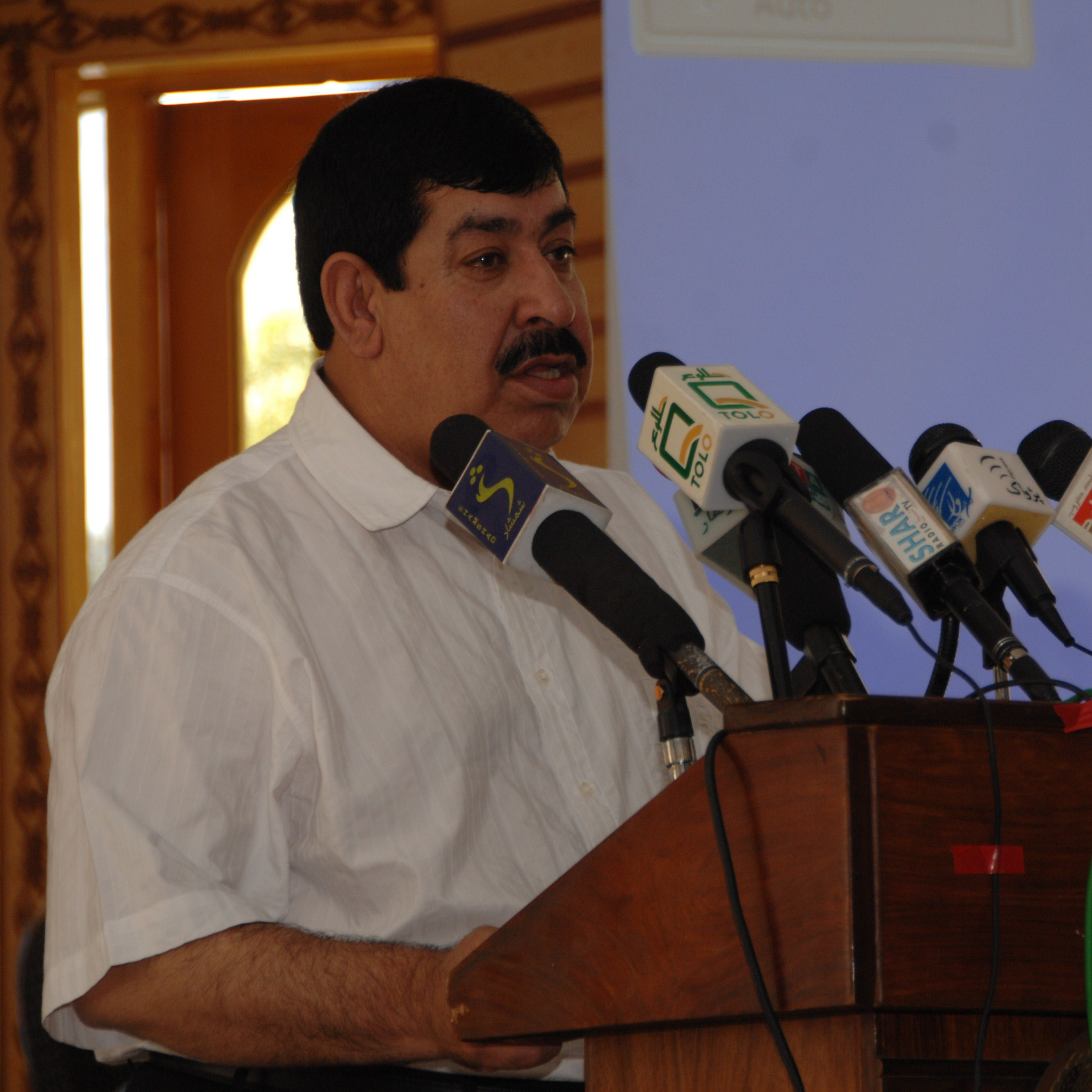
Governor Gul Agha Sherzai demanded information on why his officials, on the American side of the invasion, were being held as detainees.

Early reports said that it was an al-Qaeda compound, while General Richard Myers reported that American troops had attacked a "Taliban headquarters", and other officials said that the captives likely included both Taliban and al-Qaeda members. Over time, the US government qualified that it was likely not al-Qaeda and "mostly of a Taliban nature" or "Afghan fighters". However, Afghans protested, and journalists later revealed that the depot had been collecting arms under American orders, and the captured "fighters" were local leaders on the Americans' side, including the district police officer. The Governor of Kandahar, Gul Agha Sherzai, issued a statement noting that the structure had been collecting weapons as part of a weapons amnesty program organized by the United States, and that the Afghan casualties included the district police chief, his deputy and members of the district council, each of them loyal to the American-backed Hamid Karzai government. Eventually, the United States conceded that the attack was an instance of friendly fire, and released the prisoners on February 6. The prisoners reported that they had been beaten and abused in US custody.

On February 5, Karzai noted that the attack was "a mistake of sorts", while Secretary of Defense Donald Rumsfeld later said that the battlefield situation had been "untidy" and the US had acted on "persuasive and compelling" intelligence.

When it was revealed that a number of the dead had their hands tied behind their backs, the United States defended its actions, stating that it was common for troops to bind the hands of wounded enemies in a fight - and that some must have mistakenly bound the hands of already-dead Afghan villagers as well.

== See also ==
- 2011 NATO attack in Pakistan
