= 2006 German troops controversy =

2006 Scandal around German soldiers in Afghanistan posing with skulls in 2003 and 2004

In October 2006, German troops in Afghanistan were in the centre of an international scandal of them posing with human skulls and other skeletal remains during the War in Afghanistan (2001–2021). The images, which date to 2003 or 2004 and surfaced in October 2006, sparked widespread outrage in Germany and drew international condemnation, coming at a time when the German government was seeking to expand its military role globally.

== Emergence of the photographs ==
The controversy began when Germany's largest daily newspaper, Bild, published photos showing German soldiers posing with a human skull. One image showed a soldier holding the skull next to his exposed genitals; another depicted the skull balanced on a military vehicle. The photos were reportedly taken in 2003 near Kabul during a routine patrol by Bundeswehr troops, while some were later confirmed to date from March 2004.

Additional images published by broadcaster RTL included staged mock executions and other macabre poses with human remains. The scandal involved dozens of photos.

== Reactions and consequences ==
The publication of the photos provoked immediate condemnation from German political and military leadership. Chancellor Angela Merkel described the acts as "shameful and inexcusable." Defence Minister Franz Josef Jung called for a thorough investigation, stating: "Anyone who behaves this way has no place in the German forces." The scandal came at a particularly sensitive time, coinciding with the release of a government white paper advocating for a more assertive role for the Bundeswehr in international missions. Germany was in the process of increasing its overseas deployments, including 3,000 troops in Afghanistan, naval missions in Lebanon, and peacekeeping in Congo and Kosovo.

Wolfgang Schneiderhan, Inspector General of the Bundeswehr, confirmed that two soldiers were under investigation at the time of the first reports. In the following months, the Defence Ministry investigated approximately 5,500 soldiers. At least six soldiers, two serving and four former, were investigated specifically in connection to the published images. Some soldiers confessed to desecrating human remains and at least two were suspended in 2007.

The Defence Ministry later admitted that some officers had known about the photos as early as 2004, including a senior medical officer and a lieutenant. Although they passed on warnings not to distribute the photos further, no disciplinary action was taken at the time.

Concerns were raised over the potential impact of the photos on the Bundeswehr's reputation abroad, particularly in Muslim-majority countries. The German Foreign Ministry instructed its embassies, especially in Kabul and across the Middle East, to enhance security measures in response to the fallout.

The Afghan government expressed deep concern and urged Germany to investigate and prevent future incidents. NATO Secretary General Jaap de Hoop Scheffer condemned the behaviour. International media such as BBC, The Guardian, Al Jazeera, Radio Free Europe/Radio Liberty and Le Nouvel observateur reported about the incident.

== See also ==
- War crimes in Afghanistan
