= Uruzgan wedding bombing =

2002, US accident in Afghanistan

On 1 July 2002 in Uruzgan Province, Afghanistan, the United States Air Force carried out an airstrike on a wedding party in the village of Kakarak.

== Background ==
As part of the War in Afghanistan (2001–2021), coalition forces were conducting operations in the area against Taliban forces, specifically searching for key Taliban leaders and their families. It was believed that Mullah Omar was hiding in the village.

== Event ==
An AC-130 attack plane was orbiting the area when ground fire as part of traditional Pashtun wedding celebrations was spotted. Weapons are often shot at weddings, and thus the presence of weapons and gunfire at a wedding is not unusual.

The US planes thought they were being targeted by anti-aircraft fire and attacked. Four villages were attacked and 54 civilians were killed, with 50 more injured. The Afghan government backed up that it was a wedding, and that guests had fired bullets into the air in celebration. The attack is cited as one of many criminal negligence made by Coalition forces in the early days of the Afghan War, which increasingly drove more Afghans to fight for the Taliban. The killing of innocent family members demands severe revenge in the Pashtunwali tradition.

== Afterwards ==
On 3 July 2002, President George W. Bush extended condolences to the families of the attack.

On 8 September 2002, the United States military concluded an investigation, and stated that no wrongdoing occurred with the bombing.
