= Amanullah Khan (Herat leader) =

Herat renegade

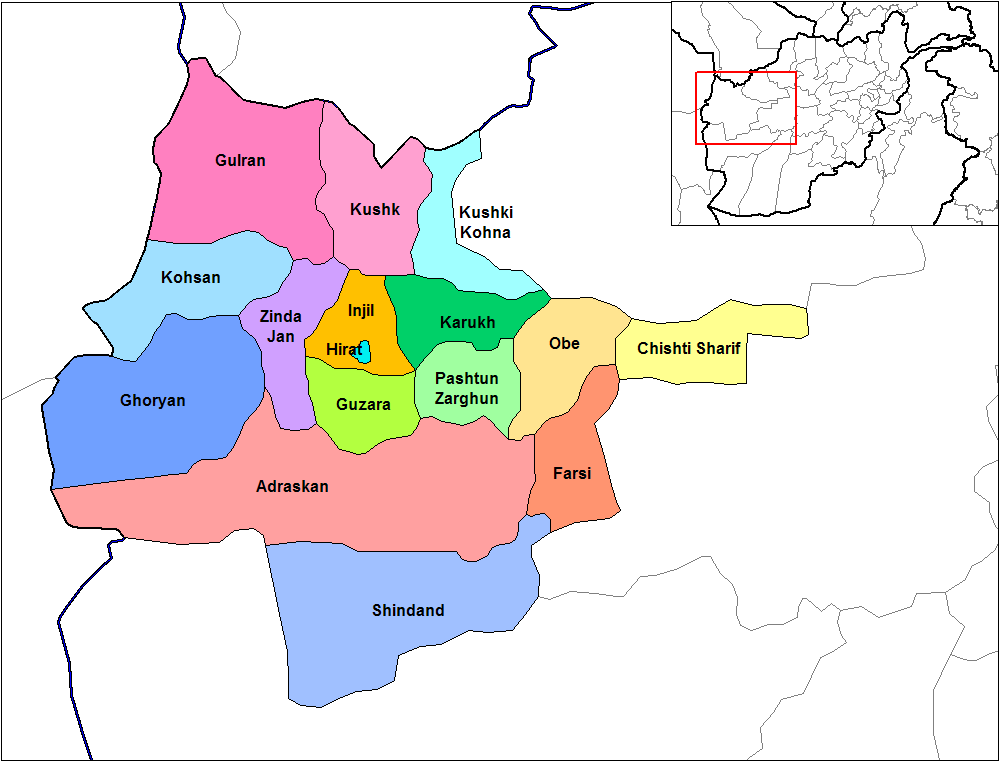
Amanullah Khan was from Ghoryan district.

Amanullah Khan (died 2006) was a citizen of Afghanistan and a tribal leader from Afghanistan's Pashtun ethnic group. He was from Ghurian district in Herat Province.

The first Governor of Herat President Hamid Karzai appointed was Ismail Khan, a powerful leader from Herat's Tajik ethnic group, who Amanullah Khan had once served under. Fighters loyal to Amanullah Khan challenged Governor Ismail Khan's authority; officials with Ismail Khan said that Amanullah Khan enjoyed some tacit support from Afghan's capital Kabul, who wanted to use his opposition to curb Ismail Khan's power.

The Australian Broadcasting Corporation (ABC) reported in 2004 that just prior to the Presidential elections Amanullah Khan had won what local reports called a "major victory" over the Governor's own local militia.

The ABC report repeated one theory about the civil war—that Amanullah Khan's attacks secretly had backing from the central government in Kabul, which hoped the attacks would erode the strength of Ismail Khan's own militia—estimated to number as many as 30,000 fighters.

In 2006, in Shindand District, Amanullah Khan killed members of a neighboring tribe and was assassinated in response.
