= 2007 Baghlan sugar factory bombing =

2007 bombing in Afghanistan

Coordinates: 36.132°N 68.7°E

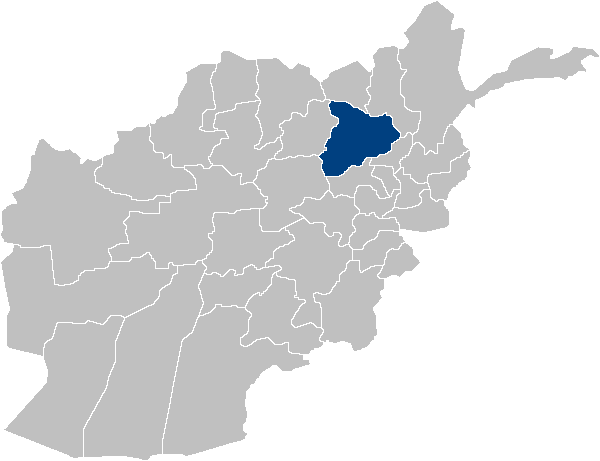
- Baghlan province
- Location: Puli Khumri, Afghanistan
- Date: November 6, 2007
- Target: Members of Parliament
- Attack type: Suicide attack
- Deaths: 26 to 78

The 2007 Baghlan sugar factory bombing occurred on November 6, 2007, when a bomb exploded outside the Baghlan Sugar Factory in Puli Khumri, Afghanistan, while a delegation of Afghan parliamentarians was visiting, killing at least 26 people including several lawmakers.

== The event ==
The parliamentarians' visit had coincided with a ceremony to re-open the Baghlan Sugar Factory as part of plans to improve the economy in the northeastern Baghlan Province. Large groups of people, including children and elderly people were lined up to assist in the inauguration of the facility. It is widely believed that the blast was caused by a bomb full of ball-bearings. It is unlikely that a suicide attacker could cause such a massive carnage.

== Fatalities ==
The exact number of those killed is unconfirmed. Some say between 69 and 78 people died in the bombing. Others say at least 26 people were killed and more than 50 wounded. The Associated Press initially reported that 64 were killed while a hospital in Baghlan mentioned that 90 bodies were sent to the hospital with 50 others wounded. An Afghan television station reported that at least 100 were killed.

Six members of the Afghan parliament were killed in the blast, including key opposition figures. The lawmakers killed in the bombing were as follows:

1. Former Commerce Minister Sayed Mustafa Kazemi
2. Hajji Muhammad Arif Zarif from Kabul Province
3. Abdul Mateen from Helmand Province
4. Al Hajj Sahib Abdul-Rahman
5. Said Rahman Hehmat from Kunar Province
6. Qudrutallah Zaki from Takhar Province

All six were members of the ten-member Economics Committee of the National Assembly.

It was reported that police officers, children and members of the Department of Agriculture were also killed. Other MPs were said to have been injured.

== Responsibility ==
There was no claim of responsibility for the blast but there were about 120 suicide attacks in Afghanistan in 2007, most of them blamed on the Taliban movement. A spokesperson for the Interior Ministry blamed the attack on "the enemy of Afghanistan, the enemy of the people of Afghanistan" referring to the militant group. Following the bombing, a Taliban official dismissed any responsibility of the group for the incident. The attacks have worsened since the fall of the Taliban in 2001.

One person was arrested and questioned the following day. According to the BBC, several claims told that it was not a suicide attack and that it was possible a roadside bomb or a rocket attack.

On the same day as the bombing in Baghlan Province, Taliban rockets were fired at an Afghan base near Kandahar during a visit by Canadian Defense Minister Peter MacKay, injuring several soldiers. That incident was likely unrelated to the Baghlan bombing.

== Reactions ==
- Taliban spokesman Zabihullah Mujahid while condemning the attack he said: "'The Baghlan explosion was not conducted by the Taliban.'"
- Afghan President Hamid Karzai had immediately condemned the attack by stating: "This heinous act of terrorism is against Islam and humanity and I condemn it in the strongest possible terms[.]" "It is the work of the enemies of peace and security in Afghanistan[.]"
- Iran's Foreign Ministry Spokesman Mohammad-Ali Hosseini said on Wednesday that targeting innocent people and members of the Afghan Parliament run counter to the Islamic teachings and human values.
- Canadian Foreign Affairs Minister Peter MacKay met with Karzai on November 7 to discuss about the ongoing deterioration of the situation. MacKay commented: "Yes, this is an undeniable tragedy and one that has shocked many. And yet this is not going to deter the Afghan people on their road to a stable, democratic, fully functioning society."
- In a statement issued on the same day United States President George W. Bush called the act as "despicable act of cowardice" that "reminds us who the enemy is—extremists with evil in their hearts" and added that the White House will be committed on working with the government of Afghanistan and NATO allies to fight the terrorists who use murder to advance their hateful ideology."

== See also ==
- List of terrorist incidents
