= Hajji Muhammad Arif Zarif =

Afghan politician and businessman

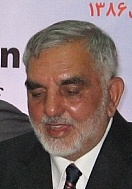
Arif Zarif 2007

Hajji Muhammad Arif Zarif (1942 in Shewaki, Kabul, Afghanistan; † November 6, 2007) was a prominent Afghan politician and businessman. He graduated from Afghanistan's military academy. He was the chairman of the Afghanistan Chamber Reform Commission and a member of the Afghan National Parliament, as well as Chairman of the Parliamentary Economics Committee and owner of several private companies. He was a wealthy businessman that owned many properties and enterprises. Arif Zarif was part of a delegation of politicians and lawmakers, several of whom were killed in the 2007 Baghlan sugar factory bombing, a suicide attack in Baghlan, northern Afghanistan, on November 6, 2007. He was buried in a state ceremony in Kabul three days later.

Arif Zarif was also a nephew of former Afghan parliamentarian Haji Abdul Rasul.

Hajji Muhammad was born in the village of Shewaki which is located in the Bagrami district in the Kabul province.
