= Abdul Tawala Ibn Ali Alishtari =

American criminal

Abdul Tawala Ibn Ali Alishtari, also known as Michael Mixon, is a former bank underwriter and resident of Ardsley, New York, convicted in Manhattan federal court with terrorism financing and conspiracy to commit wire fraud. There were also charges against him for material support of terrorism, international money laundering, and conspiracy.

He has pleaded guilty in U.S. District Court to terrorism financing and conspiracy to commit wire fraud. Specifically, the indictment accuses Alishtari of accepting an unspecified amount of money (later specified as $15,000) to transfer $152,000 to Pakistan and Afghanistan to provide night vision goggles, medical supplies, and other equipment to terrorist training camps. The international money laundering charge arises from the prosecution's allegation that Alishtari transferred $25,000 from a bank in New York to a bank in Montreal, with the intent that the funds be used to train and equip terrorists.

Prosecutors also allege that Alishtari defrauded investors of millions of dollars through a loan investment program he called the "Flat Electronic Data Interchange" (FEDI), which was ostensibly a scheme in which Alishtari promised a high, guaranteed return on their investments, but had no intention of delivering.

Alishtari was sentenced to 121 months in prison.

According to CBS and the website opensecrets.org, Alishtari is a donor to the Republican Party, having given $15,250 to the National Republican Congressional Committee between 2002 and 2004. The NRCC has not decided whether to return donations made by Alishtari.
