= War in Afghanistan (2001–2021) =

U.S Armed conflict in South Asia

- Part of the war on terror and the Afghan conflict
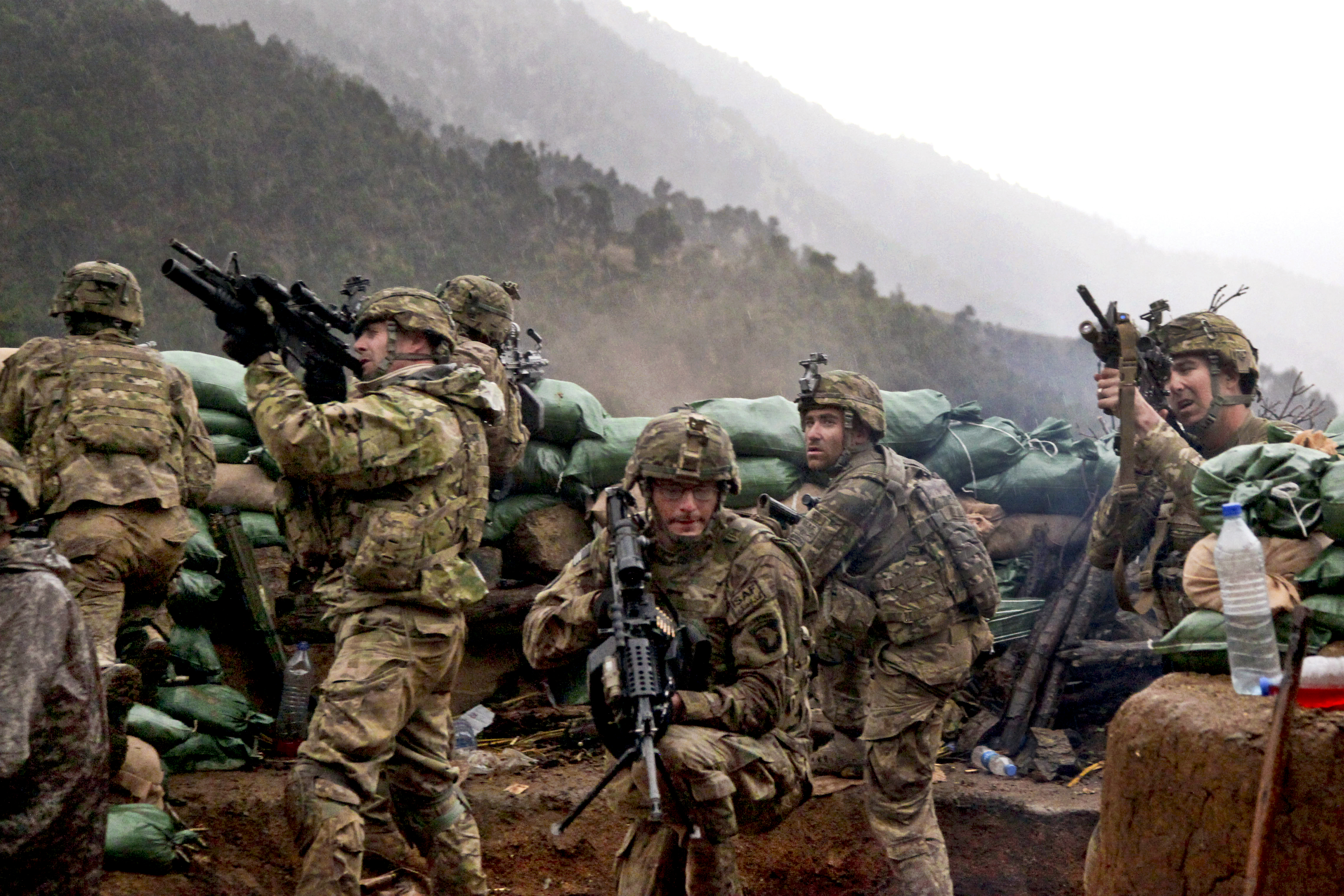
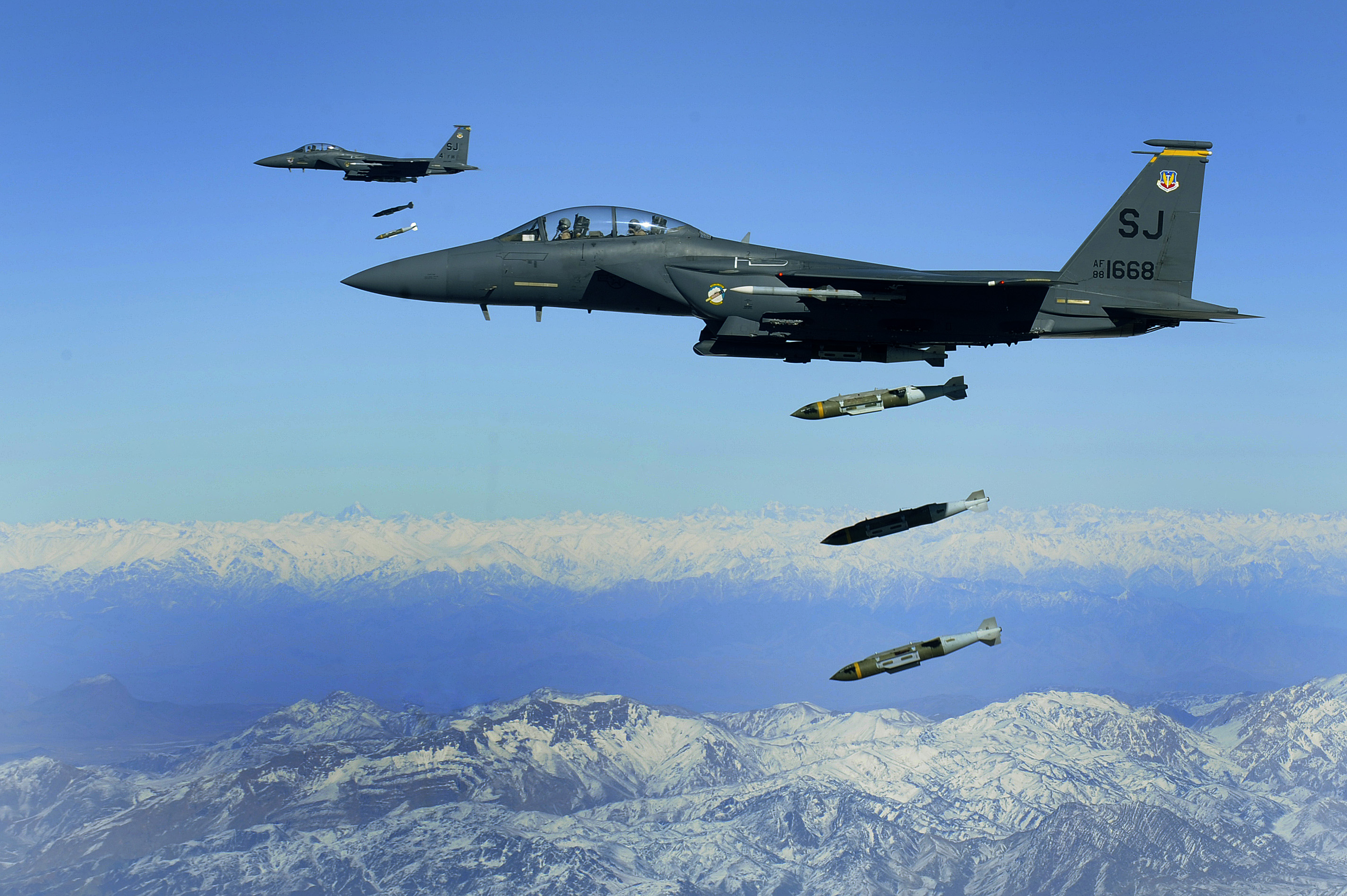
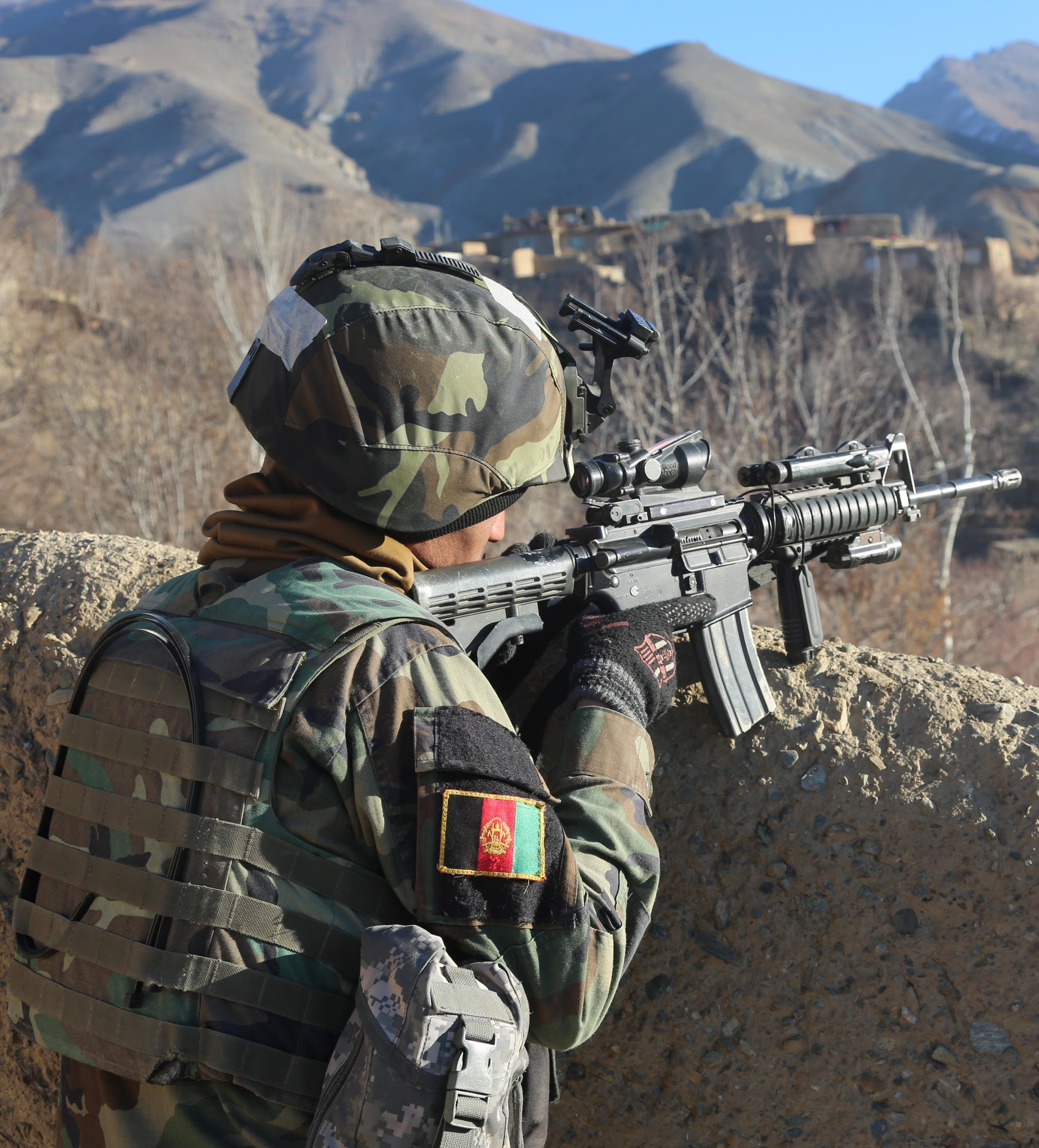
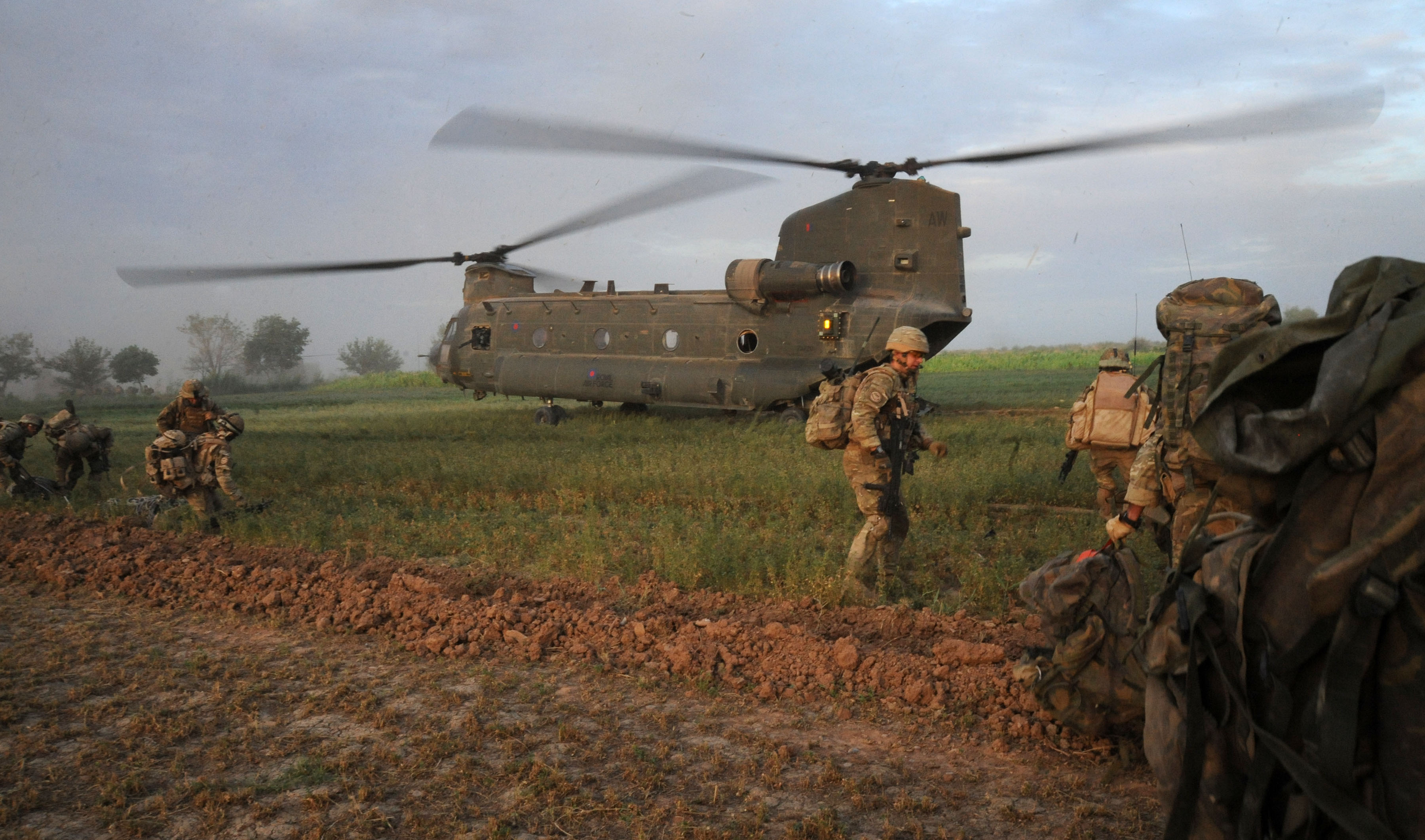
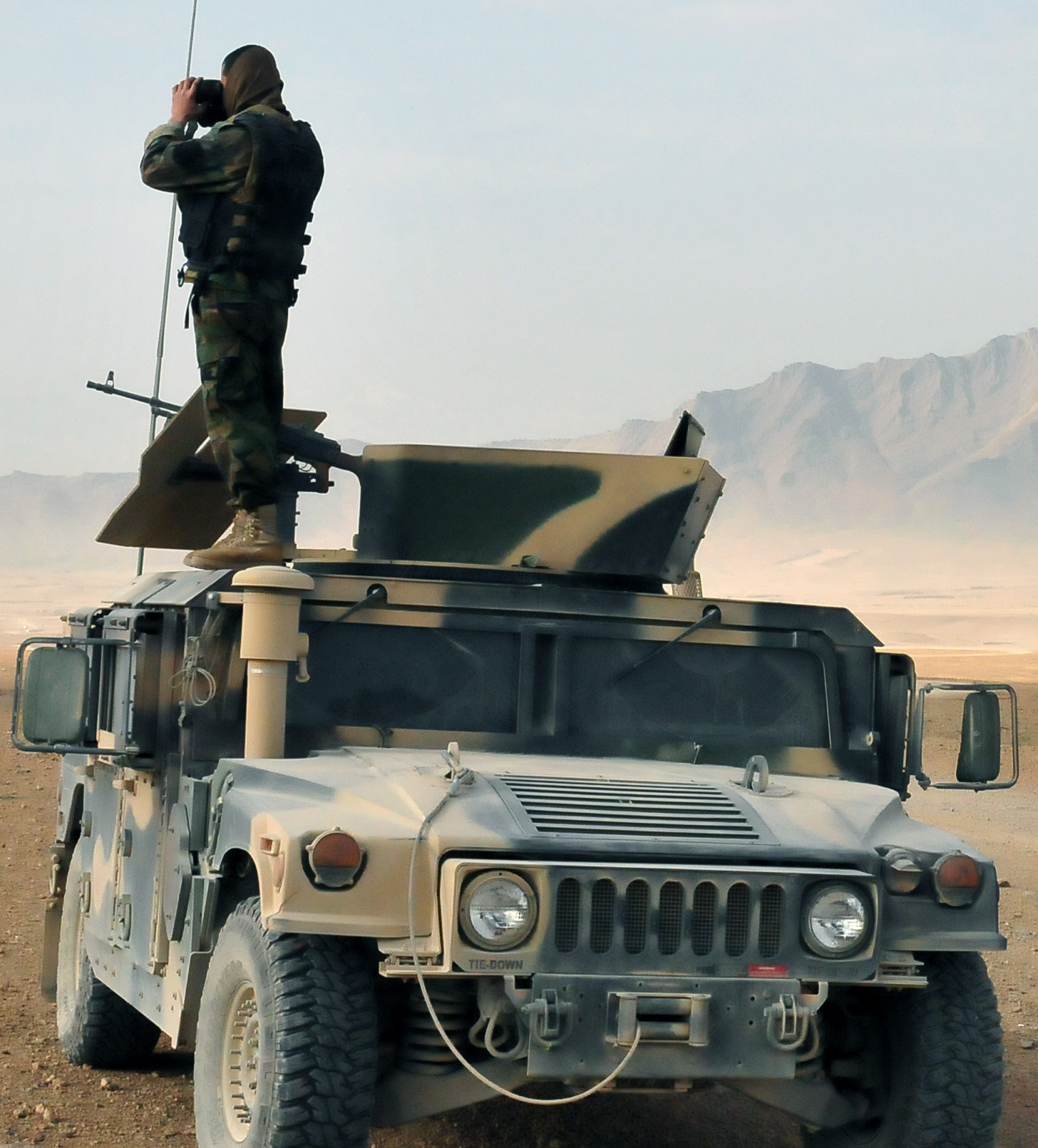
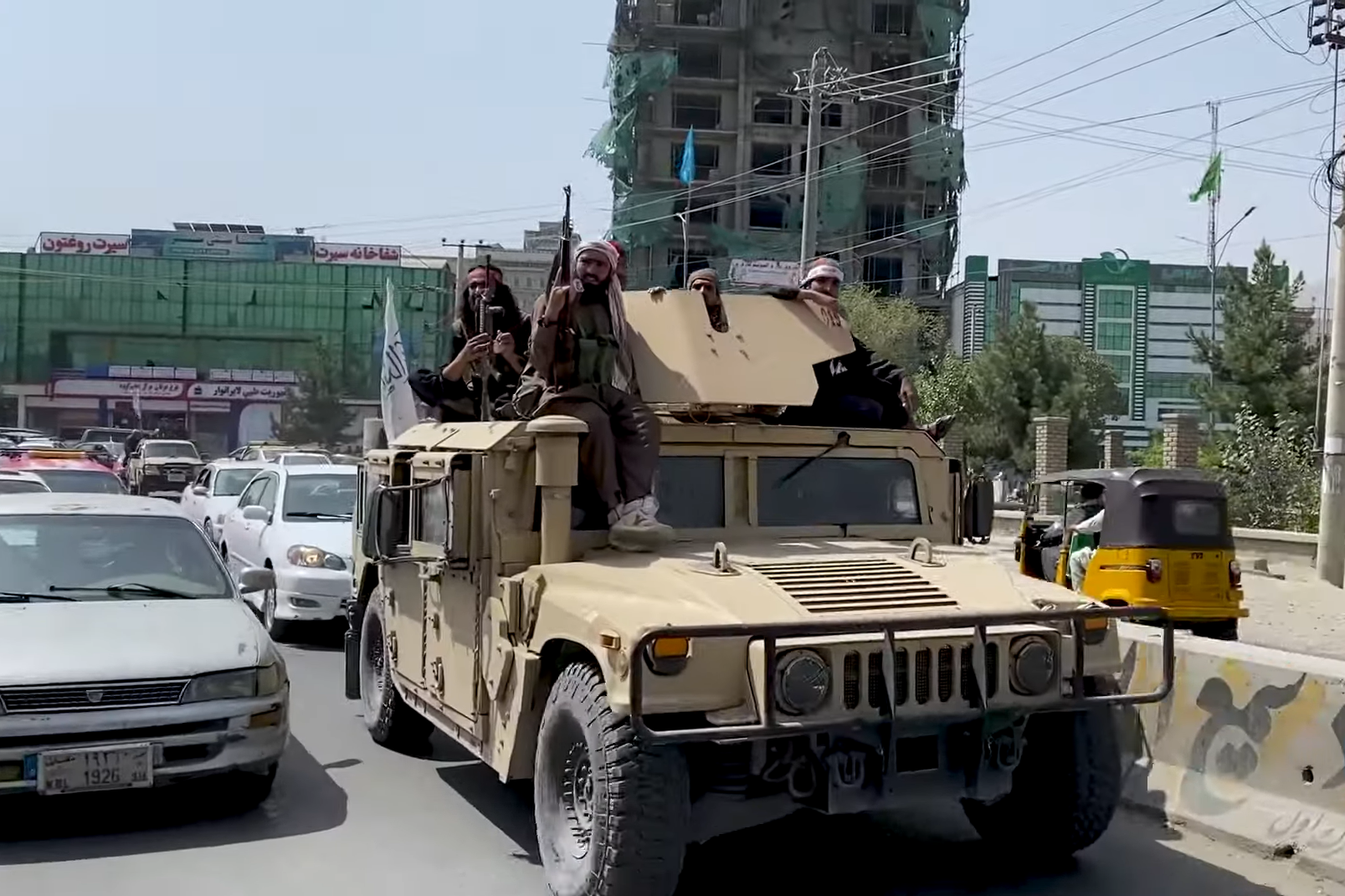
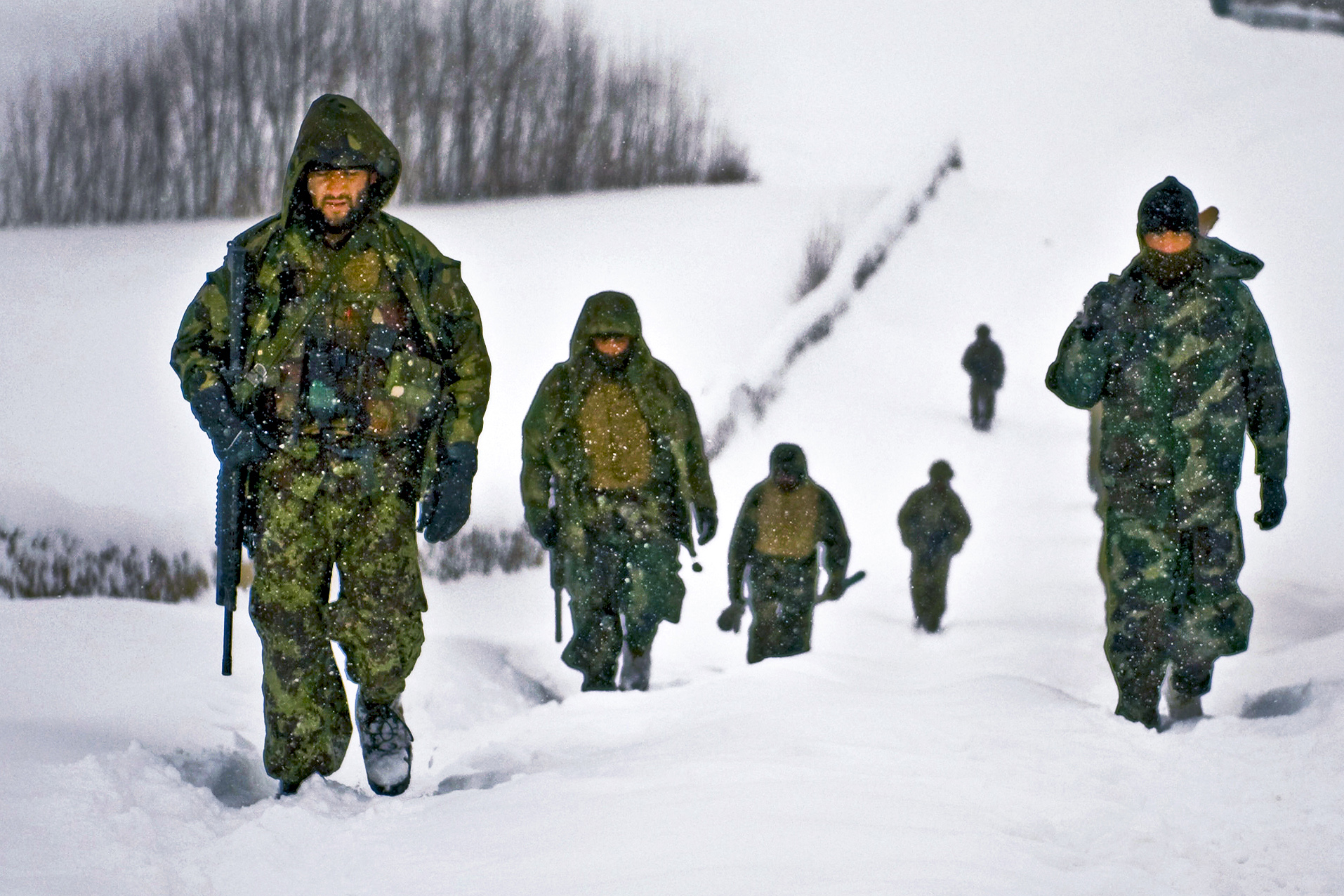
- Clockwise from top-left: American troops in a firefight with Taliban insurgents in Kunar Province; An American F-15E Strike Eagle dropping 2,000-pound JDAMs on a cave in eastern Afghanistan; an Afghan soldier surveying atop a Humvee; Afghan and American soldiers move through snow in Logar Province; victorious Taliban fighters after securing Kabul; an Afghan soldier surveying a valley in Parwan Province; British troops preparing to board a Chinook during Operation Black Prince
Date	7 October 2001 – 30 August 2021 (19 years, 10 months, 3 weeks and 2 days)
Location	Afghanistan (Note: Bordering areas of Pakistan were also affected (War in North-West Pakistan), and was considered for some time to be a single theater of operations by the United States (AfPak).)
Result	Taliban victory (see Aftermath)
Territorial changes	Taliban control over Afghanistan increases compared to pre-intervention territory

Belligerents
Invasion (2001): United States; Northern Alliance; United Kingdom; France; Canada; Italy; Germany; Australia; New Zealand; Iran	Invasion (2001): Islamic Emirate of Afghanistan; Taliban; Haqqani network; Non-state allies: Al-Qaeda; 055 Brigade; IMU; TNSM; JTJ
Insurgency (2001–2021): Islamic State of Afghanistan (2001–2002); Afghan Transitional Authority (2002–2004); Islamic Republic of Afghanistan (2004–2021); ISAF (2001–2014; 51 countries); United States; United Kingdom; Canada; Germany; Australia; Italy; New Zealand; France; Turkey; Georgia (country); Jordan; Bulgaria; Poland; Romania; Spain; Czech Republic; North Macedonia; Denmark; Armenia; Azerbaijan; Finland; Croatia; Hungary; Norway; Lithuania; Mongolia; United Arab Emirates; Belgium; Portugal; Slovakia; Netherlands; Montenegro; Latvia; Sweden; Albania; Ukraine; Bosnia–Herzegovina; Greece; Ireland; Iceland; Estonia; Austria; Malaysia; Slovenia; Colombia; Switzerland; Bahrain; El Salvador; Luxembourg; South Korea; Tonga; Singapore; Resolute Support (2015–2021; 36 countries); High Council of the Islamic Emirate of Afghanistan (allegedly; from 2015); Khost Protection Force and other pro-government paramilitaries	Insurgency (2001–2021): Taliban; Haqqani network (from 2002); Al-Qaeda; AQIS; TJA; Taliban splinter groups; Dadullah Front (from 2012); Fidai Mahaz (from 2013); Other allies: Hezb-e-Islami Gulbuddin (intermittently until 2016); Islamic Jihad Union (from 2002); Islamic Movement of Uzbekistan (until 2015); Turkistan Islamic Party; Lashkar-e-Jhangvi; Pakistani Taliban; Lashkar-e-Islam; Islamic State (from 2015); ISIL–KP; IMU

Commanders and leaders
List: (Islamic Republic of Afghanistan) Hamid Karzai; (Islamic Republic of Afghanistan) Ashraf Ghani (surrendered); (United States) George W. Bush; (United States) Barack Obama; (United States) Donald Trump; (United States) Joe Biden; (United States) Donald Rumsfeld; (United States) Robert Gates; (United States) Leon Panetta; (United States) Chuck Hagel; (United States) Ash Carter; (United States) Jim Mattis; (United States) Lloyd Austin; (United Kingdom) Tony Blair; (United Kingdom) Gordon Brown; (United Kingdom) David Cameron; (United Kingdom) Theresa May; (United Kingdom) Boris Johnson; (United Kingdom) Geoff Hoon; (United Kingdom) Liam Fox; (United Kingdom) Philip Hammond; (United Kingdom) Michael Fallon; (United Kingdom) Ben Wallace; (Canada) Jean Chrétien; (Canada) Paul Martin; (Canada) Stephen Harper; (Canada) Justin Trudeau; (Germany) Gerhard Schröder; (Germany) Angela Merkel; (Australia) John Howard; (Australia) Kevin Rudd; (Australia) Julia Gillard; (Australia) Tony Abbott; (Australia) Malcolm Turnbull; (Australia) Scott Morrison; (Italy) Silvio Berlusconi; (Italy) Romano Prodi; (Italy) Mario Monti; (Italy) Enrico Letta; (Italy) Matteo Renzi; (Italy) Paolo Gentiloni; (Italy) Giuseppe Conte; (Italy) Mario Draghi; (New Zealand) Helen Clark; (New Zealand) John Key; (New Zealand) Bill English; (New Zealand) Jacinda Ardern; Kenneth F. McKenzie Jr.; John F. Campbell; List of former ISAF Commanders; List of former RS Commanders; Nangialai †; Abdul Manan Niazi †	List: Mullah Omar #; Akhtar Mansour X; Hibatullah Akhundzada; Obaidullah Akhund (POW) #; Jalaluddin Haqqani #; Sirajuddin Haqqani; Mullah Yaqoob; Abdul Ghani Baradar; Osama bin Laden X; Ayman al-Zawahiri; Mohammed Atef X; Asim Umar †; Muhammad Rasul; Haji Najibullah; Shahab al-Muhajir; Hafiz Saeed Khan †; Mawlavi Habib Ur Rahman; Abdul Haseeb Logari †; Abdul Rahman Ghaleb †; Abu Saad Erhabi †; Abdullah Orokzai (POW); Qari Hekmat †; Mufti Nemat (surrendered); Dawood Ahmad Sofi †; Mohamed Zahran †; Ishfaq Ahmed Sofi †

Strength
ISAF: 130,000+ (peak strength); ANDSF: 307,947 (peak strength; January 2021); Resolute Support: 17,178 (peak strength; October 2019); Defence contractors: 117,227 (peak strength; Q2 2012); HCIEA: 3,000–3,500; Khost Protection Force: 3,000–10,000 (2018)	Taliban: 58,000–100,000 (2021); Haqqani network: 4,000–15,000 (2009); HIG: 1,500–2,000+ (2014); al-Qaeda: c. 300 in 2016 (c. 3,000 in 2001); Fidai Mahaz: 8,000 (2013); ISIL–KP: 3,500–4,000 (2018, in Afghanistan)

Casualties and losses
Afghan security forces: 66,000–92,000 killed; Northern Alliance: 200 killed; Coalition: Dead: 3,579; United States: 2,330; United Kingdom: 457; Canada: 159; France: 90; Germany: 62; Italy: 53; Others: 338; Wounded: 23,536; United States: 20,093; United Kingdom: 2,188; Canada: 2,071 (Note: Per figures released by Canadian Department of National Defence in June 2013, 635 were listed as WIA (wounded in action) while 1,436 were listed as NBI (non-battle injuries).); Contractors; Dead: 3,917; Wounded: 15,000+; Total killed: 73,696–99,696	Taliban insurgents: 52,893–80,000+ killed (2,000+ al-Qaeda fighters); ISIL–KP: 2,400+ killed
- Civilians killed: 46,319; Total killed: 176,206 (per Costs of War Project); 212,191+ (per UCDP); Total killed in related insurgency in Pakistan: 66,650
- ^{a} The continued list includes nations who have contributed fewer than 200 troops as of November 2014.; ^{b} The continued list includes nations who have contributed fewer than 200 troops as of May 2017.

The war in Afghanistan was a prolonged armed conflict from 2001 to 2021. It began with an invasion by a United States–led coalition under the name Operation Enduring Freedom in response to the September 11 attacks (9/11) carried out by the Taliban-allied and Afghanistan-based al-Qaeda. The Taliban were expelled from major population centers by American-led forces supporting the anti-Taliban Northern Alliance, thus toppling the Taliban-ruled Islamic Emirate. In 2004, the U.S.-backed Islamic Republic was established, but by then, the Taliban, led by founder Mullah Omar, had reorganized and begun an insurgency against the Afghan government and coalition forces. The conflict ended as the 2021 Taliban offensive reestablished the Islamic Emirate. It was the longest war in United States military history, surpassing the Vietnam War by seven months.

Following 9/11, masterminded by al-Qaeda leader Osama bin Laden, American president George W. Bush demanded that the Taliban immediately extradite him to the United States and close down al-Qaeda's camps in Afghanistan; the Taliban refused and demanded evidence of bin Laden's guilt before offering to hand him over to a neutral country. The US dismissed these offers and invaded. After expelling the Taliban and their allies, the American-led coalition remained in Afghanistan, forming the International Security Assistance Force (ISAF)—sanctioned by the United Nations—with the goal of creating a new democratic authority in the country that would prevent the Taliban from returning to power. A new Afghan Interim Administration was established, and international rebuilding efforts were launched. By 2003, the Taliban had reorganized and launched a widespread insurgency against the new Afghan government and coalition forces. Insurgents from the Taliban and other Islamist groups waged asymmetric warfare, fighting with guerrilla warfare in the countryside, suicide attacks against urban targets, and reprisals against perceived Afghan collaborators. By 2007, large parts of Afghanistan had been retaken by the Taliban following a major offensive in the year prior. In response, the coalition sent a major influx of troops for counter-insurgency operations, with a "clear and hold" strategy for villages and towns; this influx peaked in 2011, when roughly 140,000 foreign troops were operating under ISAF command across Afghanistan.

An American covert operation in neighboring Pakistan led to the killing of Osama bin Laden in 2011, and NATO leaders began planning an exit strategy from Afghanistan. In 2014, NATO formally ended ISAF combat operations in Afghanistan and officially transferred full security responsibility to the Afghan government. Unable to eliminate the Taliban through military means, coalition forces (and separately, the Afghan government led by Ashraf Ghani) turned to diplomacy to end the conflict. These efforts culminated in the United States–Taliban deal in 2020, which stipulated the withdrawal of all US troops from Afghanistan by 2021. Coinciding with the withdrawal of troops, the Taliban launched a broad offensive throughout the summer of 2021, successfully reestablishing their control over Afghanistan, including the capital city of Kabul on 15 August. On the same day, Ghani fled the country; the Taliban declared victory and the war was formally brought to a close. By 30 August, the last American military aircraft departed from Afghanistan, ending the protracted American-led military presence in the country.

Overall, the war killed an estimated 176,000–212,000+ people, including 46,319 civilians. In addition, 66,650 people were killed in the related War in North-West Pakistan. While more than 5.7 million former refugees returned to Afghanistan after the 2001 invasion, by the fall of Kabul, 2.6 million Afghans remained refugees, while another 4 million were internally displaced. Terrorist groups and pro-republic insurgents have led to ongoing post-war conflict, exacerbated by an economic and humanitarian crisis.

== Names ==
This conflict from 2001 to 2021 is referred to as the war in Afghanistan, in order to distinguish it from Afghanistan's various other wars, notably the ongoing Afghan conflict of which it was a part, and the Soviet–Afghan War. From the perspective of the West, the war is divided between 2001 and 2014 (the ISAF mission), when most combat operations were performed by coalition forces, and 2015 to 2021 (the Resolute Support Mission), when the Afghan armed forces did most of the fighting against the Taliban. The war was named Operation Enduring Freedom from 2001 to 2014 and as Operation Freedom's Sentinel from 2015 to 2021 by the US. Alternatively, it has been called the US war in Afghanistan. In Afghanistan itself, the war is known as simply the "war in Afghanistan".

== Prelude ==
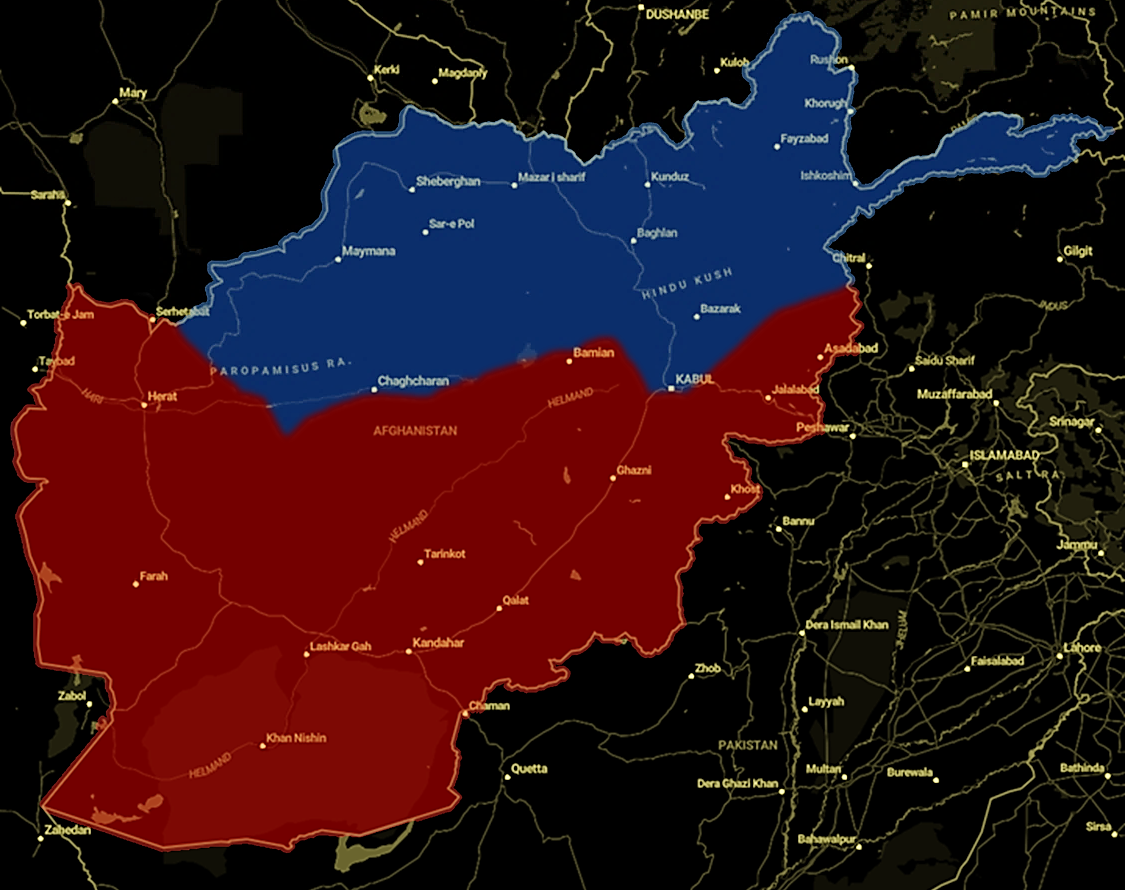
The military situation of the Afghan Civil War in 1996 between the Taliban (red) and the Northern Alliance (blue)

=== Rise of the Taliban ===
The Taliban emerged from religious students known as the Talib who sought to end warlordism in Afghanistan through stricter adherence to Sharia. In 1996, the Taliban, with military support by Pakistan and financial support from Saudi Arabia, seized Kabul and founded the Islamic Emirate of Afghanistan. The Taliban imposed their fundamentalist Deobandi interpretation of Islam in areas under their control, issuing edicts forbidding women to work outside the home, attend school or to leave their homes unless accompanied by a male relative. According to the United Nations (UN), the Taliban, while trying to consolidate control over northern and western Afghanistan, committed systematic massacres against civilians. UN officials stated that there had been "15 massacres" between 1996 and 2001, many of them targeting Shias and Hazaras.

By 2001, the Taliban controlled as much as 90% of Afghanistan, with the Northern Alliance confined to the country's northeast corner. Fighting alongside Taliban forces were some 28,000–30,000 Pakistanis (usually also Pashtun) and 2,000–3,000 al-Qaeda militants.

=== Al-Qaeda ===
The 9/11 Commission in the US found that under the Taliban, al-Qaeda was able to use Afghanistan as a place to train and teach fighters, import weapons, coordinate with other jihadists, and plot terrorist actions. While al-Qaeda maintained its own camps in Afghanistan, it also supported training camps of other organizations. An estimated 10,000 to 20,000 men passed through these facilities before 9/11, most of whom were sent to fight for the Taliban against the Northern Alliance. A smaller number were inducted into al-Qaeda.

After the 1998 US embassy bombings were linked to bin Laden, US president Bill Clinton ordered missile strikes on an al-Qaeda camp in Afghanistan. US officials pressed the Taliban to surrender bin Laden. In 1999, the international community imposed sanctions on the Taliban to motivate their extradition of him. The Taliban rebuffed these demands. Central Intelligence Agency (CIA) Special Activities Division paramilitary teams were active in Afghanistan in the 1990s in clandestine operations to locate and kill or capture bin Laden. These teams planned several operations but did not receive the order to proceed from Clinton. Their efforts built relationships with Afghan leaders that proved essential in the 2001 invasion.

=== 11 September attacks ===
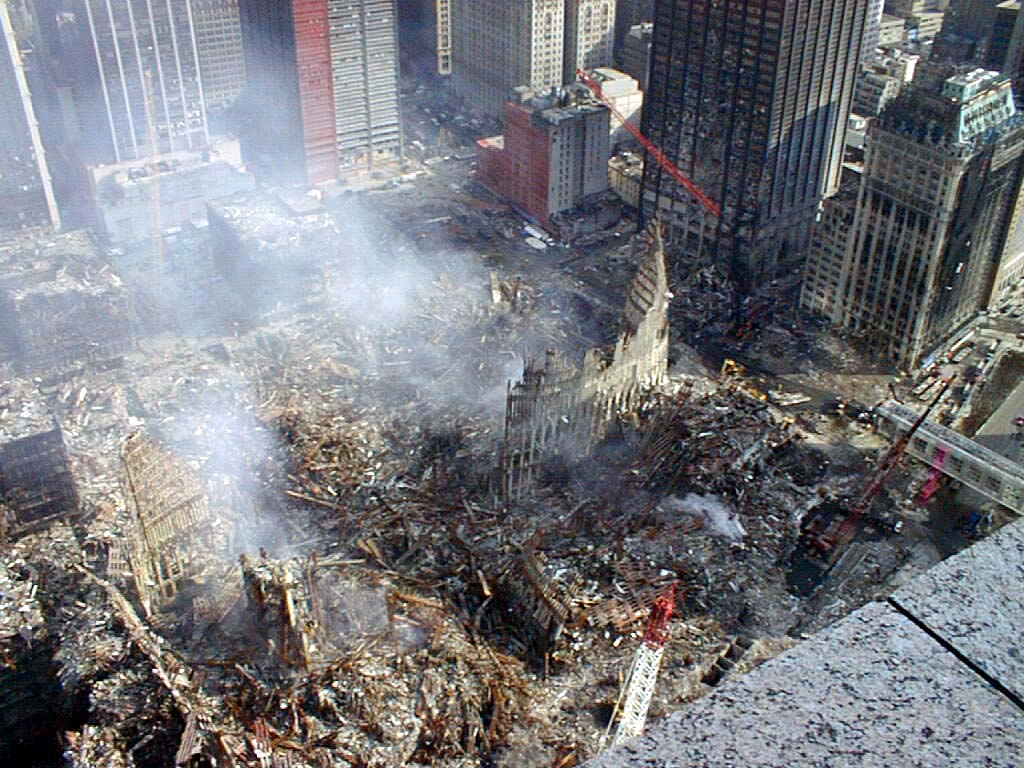
Ground Zero in New York following the September 11th attacks, September 2001

On the morning of 11 September 2001 (9/11), 19 members of al-Qaeda carried out coordinated attacks in the United States by hijacking four commercial airliners. The hijackers intentionally crashed two of them into the World Trade Center in New York City. The center collapsed as a result. The hijackers crashed a third airliner into the Pentagon in Arlington, Virginia. The fourth plane, which had been targeted at Washington, D.C., crashed into a field in Pennsylvania. No one aboard the four flights survived. Total deaths were 2,996, including the 19 hijackers.

Osama bin Laden planned and coordinated the attacks, and the US desire to hold him accountable became the casus belli for invasion. After the invasion was declared, bin Laden sought, successfully, to draw the US into an extended war similar to that fought against the Soviets. The Taliban publicly condemned 9/11. They also greatly underestimated the US' willingness to go to war. The US was mistaken in its belief that the Taliban and al-Qaeda were almost inseparable when, in fact, they had very different goals and leaders.

=== US ultimatum to the Taliban ===
Immediately after 9/11, the US National Security Council agreed that military action would probably have to be taken against al-Qaeda and the Taliban. However, Bush decided to issue an ultimatum to the Taliban first, demanding that the Taliban hand over bin Laden, "close immediately every terrorist training camp, hand over every terrorist and their supporters, and give the US full access to terrorist training camps for inspection." The same day, religious scholars met in Kabul, deciding that bin Laden should be surrendered; however, Taliban founder Mullah Omar decided that "turning over Osama would only be a disgrace for us and Islamic thought and belief would be a weakness", and that the US would continue making demands after surrendering bin Laden, who he claimed was innocent. The Taliban refused the ultimatum, saying that Osama bin Laden was protected by the traditional Pashtun laws of hospitality.

In the weeks ahead and at the beginning of the US and NATO invasion of Afghanistan, the Taliban demanded evidence of bin Laden's guilt but subsequently offered to hand him over to a third country if the US stopped its bombing and provided evidence of his guilt. A Bush administration official later stated that their demands were "not subject to negotiation" and that it was "time for the Taliban to act now." Covert US military action began soon after, and the war started officially on 7 October 2001.

== History ==
=== Tactical overview ===
The war contained two main factions: the Coalition, which included the US and its allies (eventually supporting the government of the Islamic Republic of Afghanistan), fighting against the Taliban, its allies, and its militias. Complicating the fight were Taliban splinter groups and other, more radical religious groups such as al-Qaeda, and later, the Islamic State. These radical groups sometimes fought for the Taliban, sometimes fought for their own goals, and sometimes fought against both the Taliban and the government.

Afghanistan is a rural country; in 2020, some 80% of its 33 million people lived in the countryside. This predisposes warfare to rural areas, and provides ample hiding spots for guerrilla fighters. The country also has harsh winters, which favors spring or summertime military offensives after winter lulls in fighting. Afghanistan is 99.7% Muslim, which affected the ideology of both the Taliban and the Afghan government. Centuries of foreign invasion by non-Muslims cemented the religious nature of resisting outsiders and the Afghan identity. Local religious leaders (mullahs) could influence the population as much as the government. Mullahs have traditionally been important in prescribing resistance to outsiders through calls for holy war or jihad.

Afghanistan is a largely tribal society, and this significantly influences Afghan society and politics. Tribalism is largely a source of division, unlike Islam. Pashtuns are the largest ethnic group in Afghanistan, comprising between 38% and 50% of the population. Pashtunwali, the traditional way of life for the Pashtuns, guided most tribal decision making. Tribal unity was often weak as well due to Pashtunwali's method of dealing with feuds. Traditionally, Afghan leaders have depended on tribes to keep order in rural areas because without their cooperation the state was often ineffective and weak. Afghans were more loyal to their own community and tribe, not the state, which meant that tribes would align with either the Taliban or the Government as was most beneficial.

The significant difference in power between high-tech Coalition militaries and the guerrilla Taliban led to asymmetric warfare. Owing to their roots in the anti-Soviet mujahideen, the Taliban carried on the guerrilla tactics developed in the 1980s. The mujahideen operated in small cadres of 10 to 50 men, armed with a combination of outdated and (usually looted) modern weapons. The Taliban increasingly used guerrilla tactics such as suicide, car and roadside bombs (IEDs), and targeted assassinations. By 2009, IEDs had become the Taliban's weapon of choice. The Taliban also used insider attacks as the war drew on, by planting personnel in the Afghan military and police forces.

=== 2001: Invasion and early operations ===
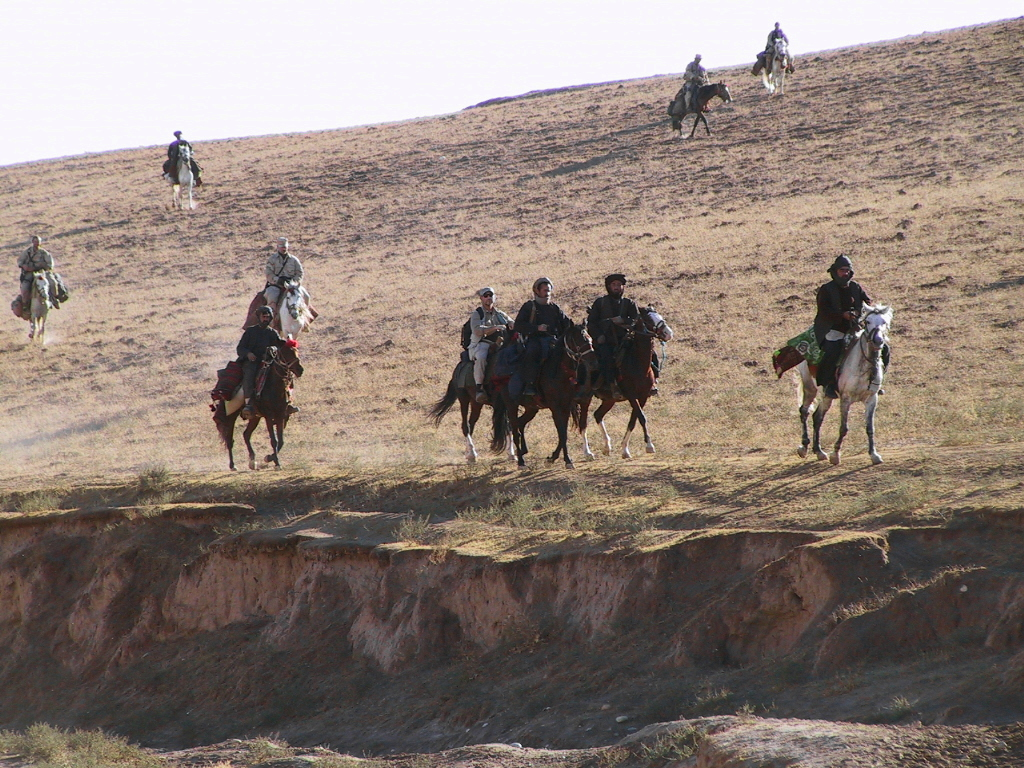
US Army Special Forces and US Air Force Combat Controllers with Northern Alliance troops on horseback in Samangan Province, 2001

Though the US officially invaded on 7 October 2001 by launching Operation Enduring Freedom, covert operations had begun several weeks earlier. Fifteen days after 9/11, the US covertly inserted members of the CIA's Special Activities Division into Afghanistan, forming the Northern Afghanistan Liaison Team. They linked up with the Northern Alliance in the Panjshir Valley north of Kabul. In October, twelve-man Special Forces teams began arriving in Afghanistan to work with the CIA and Northern Alliance. Within a few weeks the Northern Alliance, with assistance from the US ground and air forces, captured several key cities from the Taliban. The Taliban retreated throughout the country, holding steady only in Kunduz Province, outmatched by US air support. By November, the Taliban had lost control of most of the country.

The US did not invade alone: it began with assistance from the UK, and eventually over a dozen more countries. The US and its allies drove the Taliban from power and built military bases near major cities across the country. Most al-Qaeda and Taliban were not captured, escaping to neighboring Pakistan or retreating to rural or remote mountainous regions. On 20 December 2001, the UN authorized an International Security Assistance Force (ISAF), with a mandate to help the Afghans maintain security in Kabul and surrounding areas. Its mandate did not extend beyond the Kabul area for the first few years. 18 countries contributed to the force in February 2002.

The CIA created Counter-terrorism Pursuit Teams staffed by Afghans at the war's beginning. This force grew to over 3,000 by 2010 and was considered one of the "best Afghan fighting forces." These units were not only effective in operations against the Taliban and al-Qaeda forces in Afghanistan, but also expanded their operations into Pakistan.

Who would lead the country became an acute political question. At the Bonn Conference in December 2001, Hamid Karzai was selected to head the Afghan Interim Administration, which after a 2002 loya jirga (grand assembly) in Kabul became the Afghan Transitional Administration. The agreement provided steps that would lead to democracy for the country.

Shortly after the elevation of Karzai to the president on 5 December, the Taliban may have tried to seek a conditional surrender to Karzai. There are two conflicting accounts. The first is that an agreement, possibly signed by Mullah Omar, was reached wherein the Taliban would surrender in exchange for immunity. The second is that the agreement was more narrowly focused on surrendering Kandahar. Taliban sources, on the other hand, said Omar was not part of the deal, and would not surrender Kandahar. Whatever the case, the US vetoed any sort of negotiation. Omar disappeared, leaving for Pakistan or elsewhere in Afghanistan. The Taliban went into hiding, or fled to Pakistan, though many gave up arms as well. Most leaders and thousands of fighters went to Pakistan. Whether the Taliban had decided on an insurgency at this time is unknown. Taliban fighters remained in hiding in the rural regions of four southern provinces: Kandahar, Zabul, Helmand and Uruzgan.

By late November, bin Laden was at a fortified training camp in Tora Bora. The Battle of Tora Bora began on 30 November. CIA teams working with tribal militias followed bin Laden there and began to call in airstrikes to clear out the mountainous camp, with special forces soon arriving in support. While the tribal militia numbered 1,000, it was not fighting eagerly during Ramadan. While the CIA requested that US Army Rangers be sent and Marines were ready to deploy, they were declined. Bin Laden was eventually able to escape at some point in December to Pakistan.

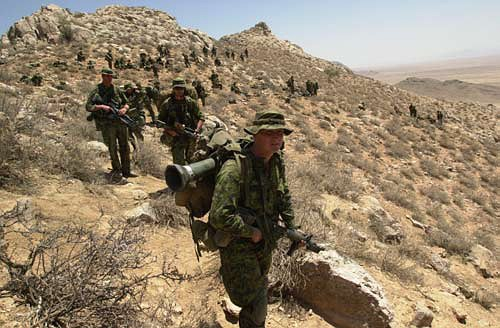
Canadian soldiers from 3PPCLI, search for al-Qaeda and Taliban fighters after an air assault, approach on an objective north of Qalati Ghilji, 2002

The invasion was a striking military success for the Coalition. Fewer than twelve US soldiers died between October and March, compared to some 15,000 Taliban killed or taken prisoner. Special forces teams and their Afghan allies had done most of the work and relatively few soldiers had been required. Karzai was a respected, legitimate, and charismatic leader. Still, Malkasian writes, the failure to capture bin Laden or negotiate with the Taliban, or include them in any way in the new government, set the course for the long war that bin Laden had dreamed of getting the US into.

In the war's early years, Pakistan had been seen as a firm ally, and little concern had been given to its support of the Taliban. Pakistan had also helped capture numerous top al-Qaeda leaders, including Khalid Sheikh Mohammed. But internally, Pakistan was providing significant funding, access to safe houses, and political support to the Taliban. Public opinion in Pakistan heavily favored the Taliban, and the US invasion was viewed very negatively. The government was in no position to expel the Taliban, lest it starts a conflict within its already fragile country. Thus the Taliban continued to use Pakistan as a base of operations and a safe haven to rebuild their strength.

=== 2002–2005: Taliban resurgence ===
==== Coalition mistakes, Taliban start to re-organize ====
Following initial success, the US lacked an obvious goal in Afghanistan beyond the counter-terrorism objectives of finding senior Taliban and al-Qaeda leaders. Nation-building was initially opposed by the Bush administration, but as the US stayed, it slowly crept into the rationale for staying. In April 2002, Bush made a speech expressing a desire to rebuild Afghanistan. The US also sought to instill democracy and women's rights as a moral matter. The international community contributed to the development effort in Afghanistan, which focused on aid and creating institutions to run the country. US reconstruction efforts also focused on improving education, health care, and community development. The US helped create and funded a new Afghan army in early 2002. However, the army was built slowly due to competing interests and a US belief that the Taliban were no longer a strong threat. Some in the Bush administration preferred to use the Northern Alliance and warlords as the military instead of creating a new military. The army became an afterthought and was poorly trained and equipped, further enabling the Taliban.

The first attempt at a larger organization of Taliban groups after the invasion occurred in April 2002 in the country's south. A shura was established by former mid-level Taliban officials in Gardi Jangal, a refugee camp near the Helmand border. It operated in the core provinces of Kandahar, Helmand, Zabul, and Uruzgan. It was composed of 23 groups of about 50 individuals each, for a total of around 1,200. In the North Waziristan District of Pakistan, Jalaluddin Haqqani had started organizing the Haqqani network after exiling there in 2001. In early 2002, their membership was estimated at 1,400 and had a presence in Paktia Province and Khost Province in the second half of 2002 with limited activity. They were joined by members of al-Qaeda. Operation Jacana & Operation Condor, among others, tried to flush out the Taliban with varying results.

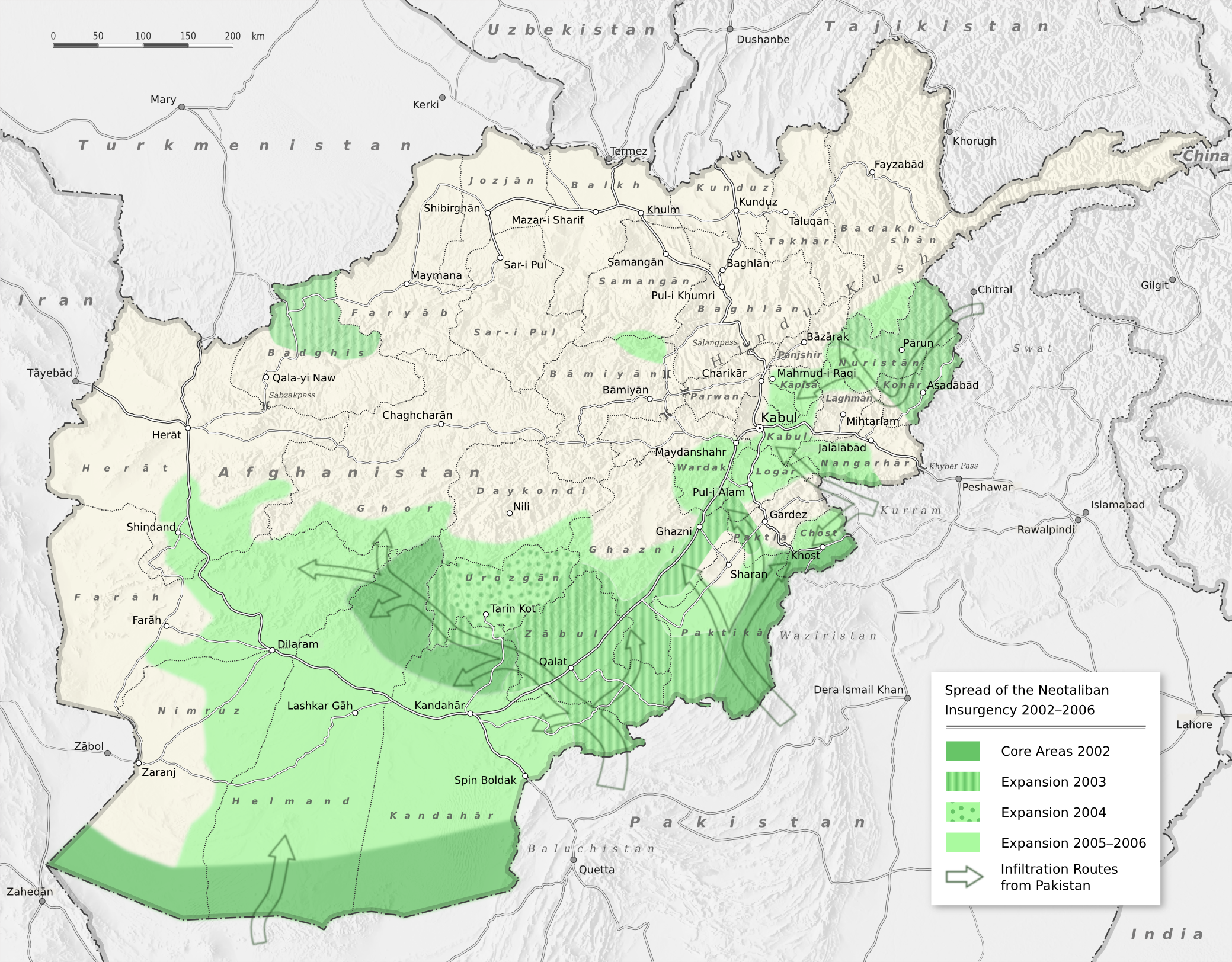
Map detailing the spread of the Taliban insurgency, 2002–2006

Some members of the Taliban reached out to Karzai to open negotiations several times between 2002 and 2004, but the US was adamantly against this, and ensured that all top Taliban leaders were blacklisted, such that the Afghan Government could not negotiate with them. Malkasian argues that negotiations with the Taliban would have been low cost, but highly effective at this stage, and attributes it to US overconfidence and hubris, and notes that all the information that the Taliban could resurge was available but ignored. Some Taliban leaders considered joining the political process, with meetings on the issue until 2004, though these did not result in a decision to do so.

From 2002 to 2005, the Taliban reorganized and planned a resurgence. Pressure on coalition forces to hunt down terrorists led to excesses and generated some popular support for the Taliban. Coalition troops would go on missions with questionable intelligence, at one point falling prey to a false tip provided by a target's political opponents. Few high-level Taliban or al-Qaeda leaders were caught. Those captured were predominantly low-level Taliban operatives who had little information on al-Qaeda. Numerous civilians were killed in operations, including a wedding which was misinterpreted as a Taliban gathering. Repeated errors by Coalition forces drove Taliban recruitment.

Many Taliban leaders who had given up arms to leave peacefully, especially after being promised amnesty by Karzai, were increasingly harassed by the US and elements of the Afghan government. By 2004, most Taliban leaders in Afghanistan had fled back to Pakistan, where the remnants of the Taliban were hiding. Malkasian argues that the US provided significant momentum to the Taliban by its own missteps, especially by focusing on aggressive counter-terrorism and vengeance for 9/11. He further argues that these actions alone did not restart the conflict because the Taliban would have re-emerged regardless because of leaders like Mullah Omar and Jalaluddin Haqqani who had never put down arms.

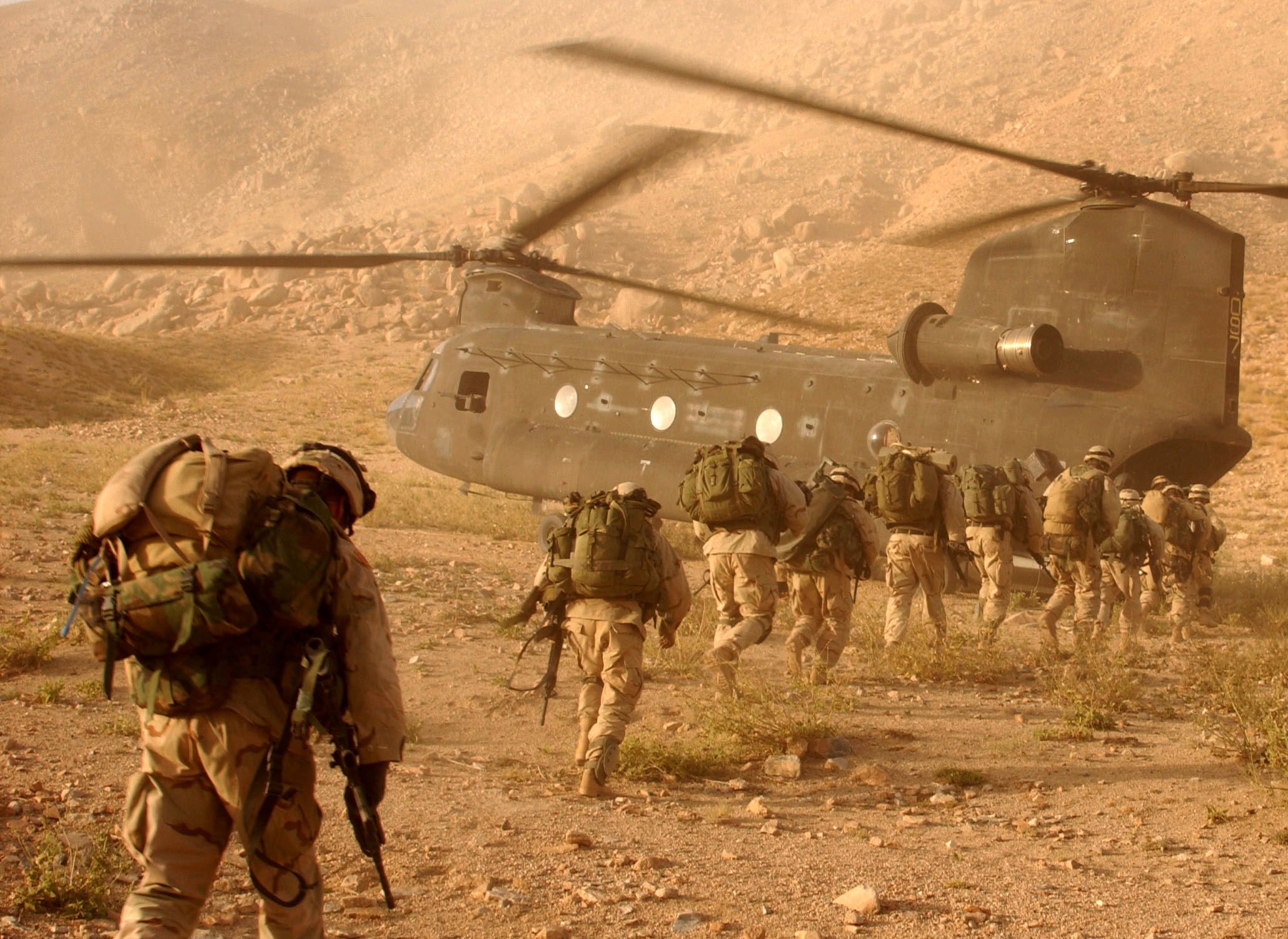
US Army Soldiers board a helicopter in Zabul province, 2003

The Taliban undertook relatively few actions until 2005. Pamphlets by Taliban and other groups appeared in towns and the countryside in early 2003, urging Muslims to take up a holy war against Americans and other foreign troops. American attention was diverted from Afghanistan when US forces invaded Iraq in March 2003. In May 2003, the Taliban Supreme Court's chief justice, Abdul Salam, proclaimed that the Taliban were back, regrouped, rearmed, and ready for guerrilla war to expel US forces from Afghanistan.

As the summer of 2003 continued, Taliban attacks gradually increased in frequency. Dozens of Afghan government soldiers, NGO humanitarian workers, and several US soldiers died in the raids, ambushes, and rocket attacks. Besides guerrilla attacks, Taliban fighters began building up forces in the district of Dey Chopan District in Zabul Province. The Taliban decided to make a stand there. Over the summer, up to 1,000 guerrillas moved there. Over 220 people, including several dozen Afghan police, were killed in August 2003. On 11 August, NATO assumed control of ISAF.

Omar reorganized the movement, and in 2003, launched an insurgency against the government and ISAF. From the second half of 2003 and through 2004, operations intensified, with night letters followed by kidnappings and assassinations of government officials and collaborating village elders by 2005, with the former leaving villages in fear. Government schools and clinics were burned down.

Privately, the Taliban were preparing a grand offensive against the Coalition. It was to be several years in the making so that enough strength could be gathered. Dadullah was put in charge of it. His tactics were largely effective. He was responsible for introducing suicide bombing into wide use around 2004, as previously, suicide or taking civilian lives had only been an al-Qaeda tactic. A network of madrassas in Pakistan catering to Afghan refugees provided a steady stream of extremist recruits willing to die.

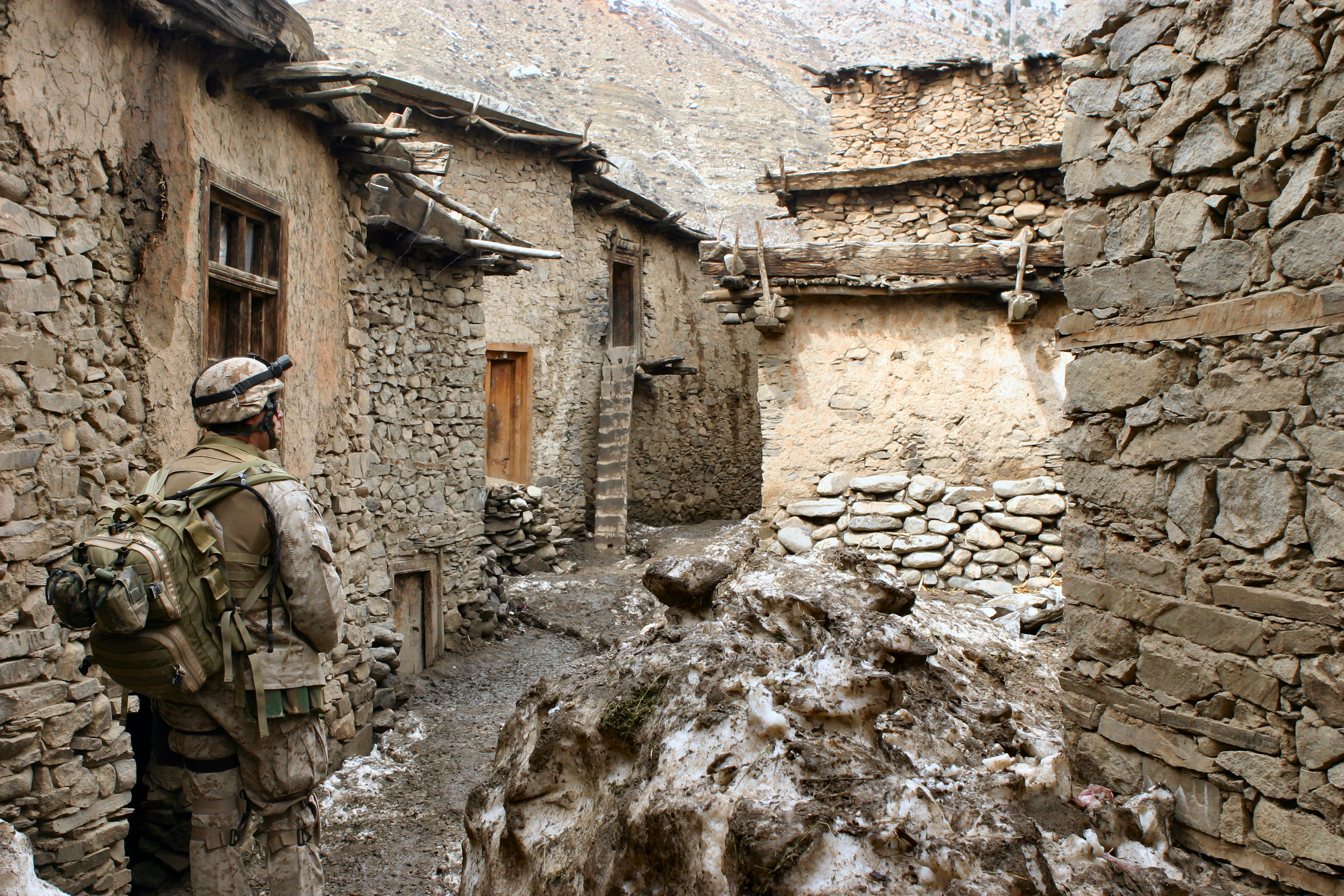
A US Navy Corpsman searches for Taliban fighters in Mihtarlam, 2005

Operation Asbury Park cleared out Taliban forces in the Dey Chopan District during summer 2004. In late 2004, the then-hidden Omar announced an insurgency against America and the transitional Afghan government forces to "regain the sovereignty of our country." The 2004 Afghan presidential election was a major target of the Taliban, though only 20 districts and 200 villages elsewhere were claimed to have been successfully prevented from voting. Karzai was elected president of the country, now named the Islamic Republic of Afghanistan.

The US started using drone strikes in Pakistan in 2004, starting along the Federal Tribal Areas against Taliban and al-Qaeda militants.

In June and July 2005, US Navy Seals carried out Operation Red Wings as a joint military operation in Kunar Province. The mission intended to disrupt local Taliban led by Ahmad Shah, hopefully bringing stability and facilitating the Afghan Parliament elections scheduled for September 2005. The operation had one survivor, and left 19 dead. Operation Whalers would finish the job several weeks later. Taliban activity dropped significantly and Shah was seriously wounded. Shah was not able to undertake any significant operations subsequent to Operation Whalers in Kunar or neighboring provinces.

The Taliban regained control over several villages in the south by the end of 2005, as villages were frustrated with the lack of government help, and hoped life would be better under the Taliban. Years of planning were coming to fruition for the Taliban. By comparison, the Government was in a very weak position. The police were deeply underfunded, and the average district had only 50 officers. Some districts had no Government presence at all. Most of the country's militias (with a strength of ~100,000) had been demobilized due to international pressure to create an army, but it was still weak. Combined with an increase in tribal feuding, the conditions were perfect for a Taliban comeback.

=== 2006–2007: Escalating war ===
As insurgent attacks in the country reportedly grew fourfold between 2002 and 2006, by late 2007 Afghanistan was said to be in "serious danger" of falling into Taliban control despite the presence of 40,000 ISAF troops.

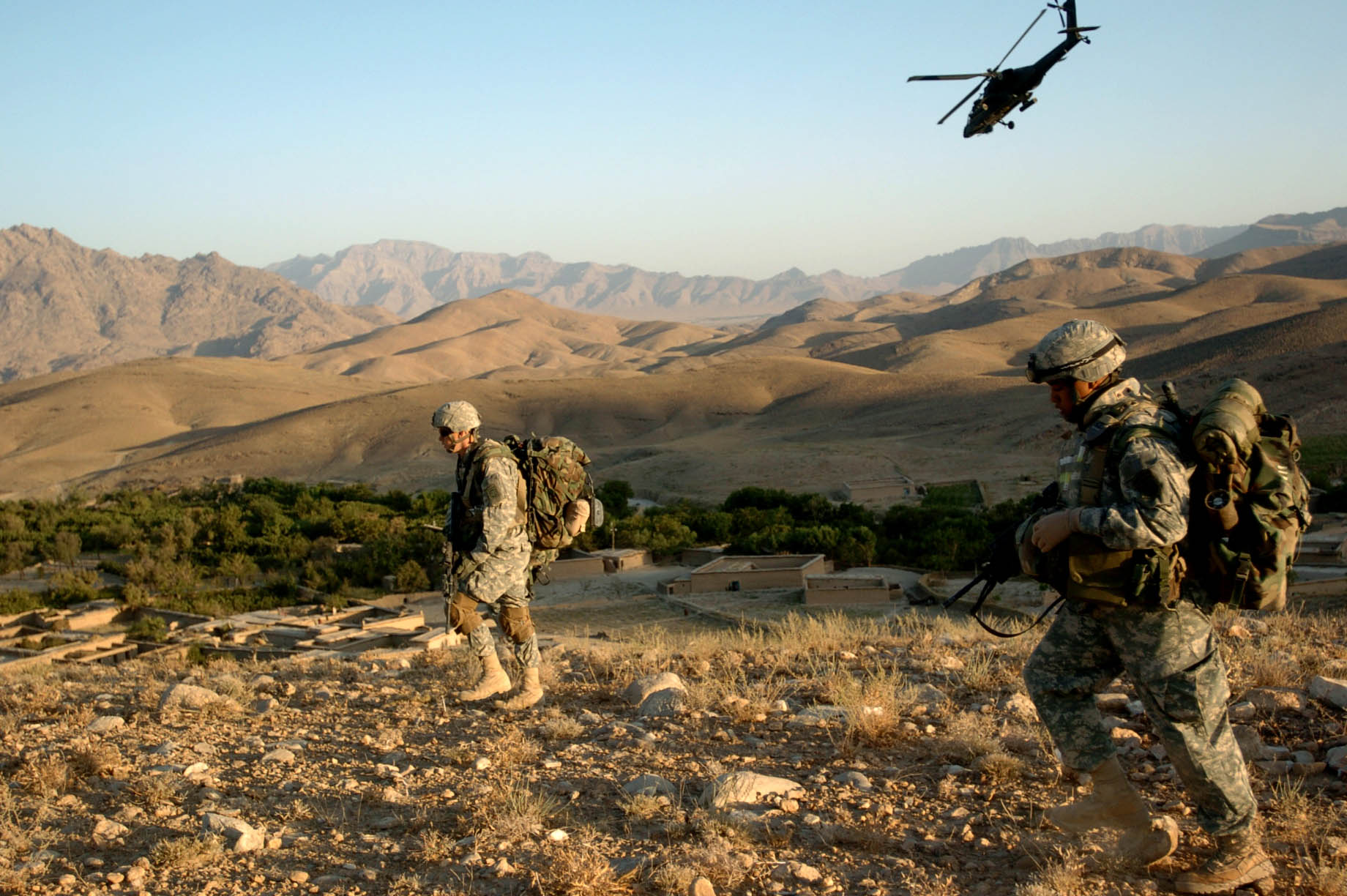
An Apache helicopter provides protection from the air, Lwar Kowndalan in Kandahar, 2005

From January 2006, a multinational ISAF contingent started to replace US troops in southern Afghanistan. The UK formed the core of the force, along with Australia, Canada, the Netherlands, and Estonia. In January 2006, NATO's focus in southern Afghanistan was to form Provincial Reconstruction Teams. Local Taliban figures pledged to resist. Since Canada wanted to deploy in Kandahar, the UK was assigned to Helmand province. Helmand was a center of poppy production, so it appeared to be a good region for the anti-narcotic focused UK. However, Pashtun Helmandis had never forgotten the 1880 Battle of Maiwand with the British, and it proved a source of significant resistance.

Local intelligence suggested that the Taliban were going to wage a brutal campaign in the summer of 2006. Coalition generals sent this info up the chain of command, but decision-makers ignored warnings. The US was distracted in Iraq, and Secretary of State Rumsfeld was more interested in making the Afghan army affordable than effective. Of the 70,000 soldiers the Afghan army was supposed to have, only 26,000 had been trained and retained.

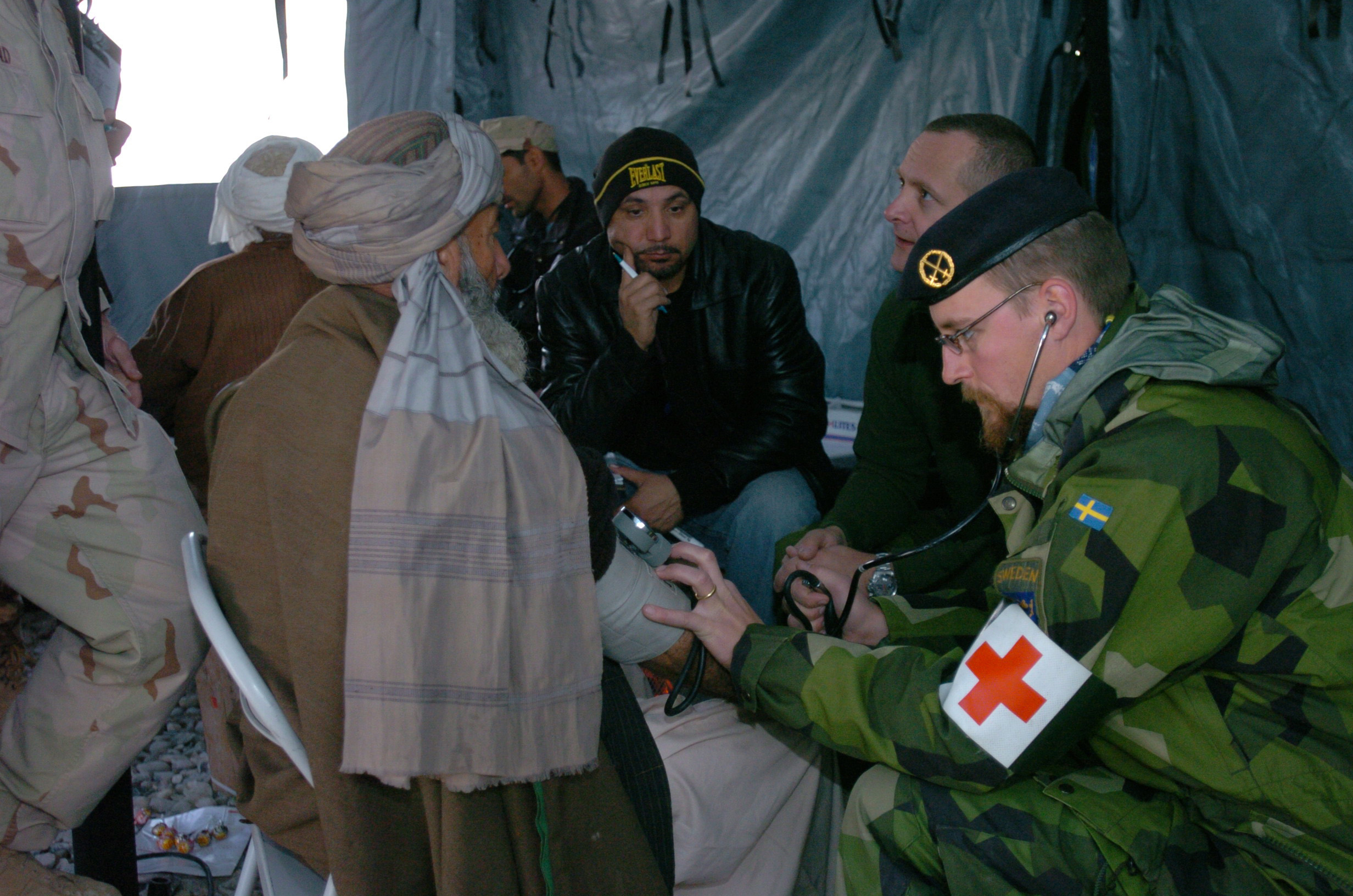
Swedish Army medic in the Mazar-e Sharif region, 2006

Spring and summer action in 2006 by the Coalition included Operation Mountain Thrust, Operation Medusa, a Dutch/Australian offensive, the Battle of Panjwaii, Operation Mountain Fury and Operation Falcon Summit. The Coalition achieved tactical victories and area denial, but the Taliban were not completely defeated.

On 29 May 2006, a US military truck that was part of a convoy in Kabul lost control and plowed into civilian vehicles, killing one person and injuring six. The surrounding crowd got angry and a riot arose, ending with 20 dead and 160 injured. When stone-throwing and gunfire had come from a crowd of some 400 men, the US troops had used their weapons "to defend themselves" while leaving the scene, a US military spokesman said. A Financial Times reporter suggested that this was the outbreak of "a ground swell of resentment" towards foreigners that had been growing since 2004.

UK actions in early 2007 included Operation Volcano, Operation Achilles, and Operation Lastay Kulang. The UK Ministry of Defence also announced its intention to bring British troop levels in the country up to 7,700.

In March 2007, the US deployed some 3,500 more troops, though deployment was slow due to American priorities in Iraq. In the first five months of 2008, US troops in Afghanistan increased by over 80%, with a surge of 21,643 more troops—26,607 in January to 48,250 in June.

On 4 March 2007, US Marines allegedly killed at least 12 civilians and injured 33 in Nangarhar, in a response to a bomb ambush. The 120 member Marine unit responsible for the attack were ordered to leave the country because the incident damaged the unit's relations with the local population.

Development of ISAF troop strength from 2007 to 2015

During the summer, NATO forces achieved tactical victories at the Battle of Chora in Orūzgān, where Dutch and Australian ISAF forces were deployed. The Battle of Musa Qala took place in December. Afghan units were the principal fighting force, supported by British forces. Taliban forces were forced out of the town.

In 2007, Western analysts estimated the strength of Taliban forces at about 10,000 fighters fielded at any given time. Of that number, only 2,000 to 3,000 were highly motivated, full-time insurgents. The rest were volunteer units, made up of young Afghans, angered by deaths of Afghan civilians in military airstrikes and American detention of Muslim prisoners who had been held for years without being charged. In 2007, more foreign fighters came into Afghanistan than ever before, according to officials. Approximately 100 to 300 full-time combatants were foreigners, many from Pakistan, Uzbekistan, and Chechnya. They were reportedly more violent, and uncontrollable, often bringing superior video-production or bomb making expertise. By 2010, the Taliban had as many as 25,000 dedicated soldiers, almost as many as before 9/11.

General McChrystal, newly appointed as US commander in Afghanistan, said that the Taliban had gained the upper hand. In a continuation of the Taliban's usual strategy of summer offensives, the militants aggressively spread their influence into north and west Afghanistan and stepped up their attack in an attempt to disrupt presidential polls. He added that the US strategy was to stop their momentum, and focus on protecting and safeguarding Afghan civilians, calling it "hard work."

=== 2008–2009: NATO build-up, Pakistan skirmishes, and Karzai re-election ===
On 28 April 2008, US Marine forces launched Operation Azada Wosa in Garmsir District, Helmand Province, clearing Taliban-held positions from an important insurgent staging and transit area. After a 35-day combat phase, coalition forces shifted to stabilization operations, and responsibility for northern Garmsir was transferred to Afghan forces and their British mentors on 8 September.

On 13 June 2008, Taliban fighters demonstrated their ongoing strength, freeing all prisoners in Kandahar jail. The operation freed 1200 prisoners, 400 of whom were Taliban, causing a major embarrassment for NATO. By the end of 2008, the Taliban apparently had severed remaining ties with al-Qaeda. According to US officials, perhaps fewer than 100 members of al-Qaeda remained in Afghanistan.

In summer 2008, Bush authorized raids against militants in Pakistan. Pakistan said it would not allow foreign forces onto its territory, and would protect its sovereignty. In September, it stated that it had issued orders to fire upon US soldiers who crossed the border.

Also in September, Bush announced 8,000 troops would withdraw from Iraq, and an increase of up to 4,500 troops in Afghanistan. The same month, the UK lost its 100th service-person.

On 3 September, US commandos landed by helicopter and attacked three houses close to a known enemy stronghold in Pakistan. Pakistan condemned the attack as "a gross violation of Pakistan's territory." On 6 September, in an apparent reaction, Pakistan announced an indefinite disconnection of supply lines to NATO forces. A further split occurred when Pakistani soldiers fired on NATO aircraft which had crossed the border on 25 September. However, despite tensions, the US increased its drone attacks in Pakistan's border regions, in particular the Federal Tribal Areas and Balochistan; by 2009, drone attacks were up 183% since 2006.

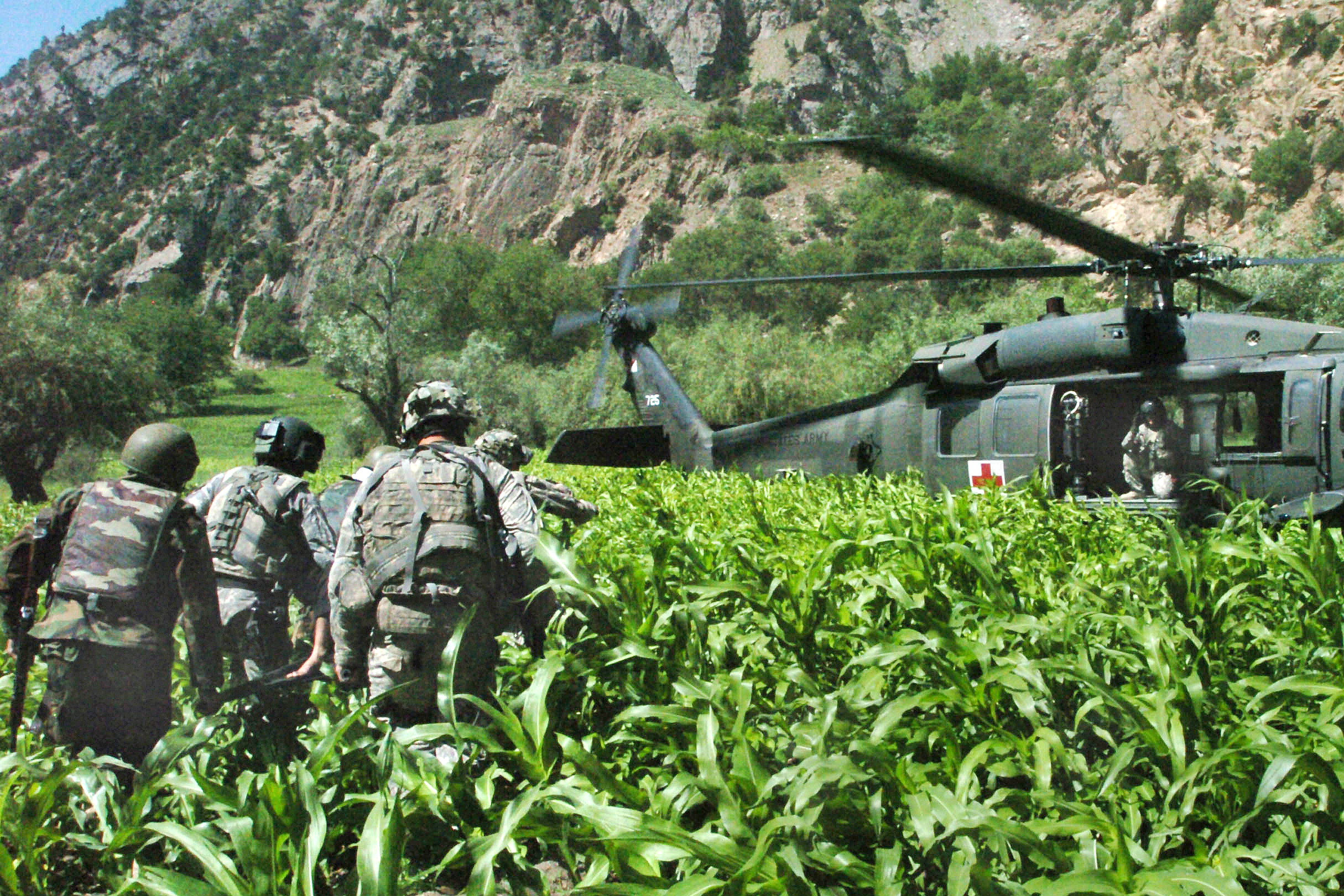
US Army 10th Mountain Division Soldiers medically evacuating in Nuristan, Province, 2009

By 2009 there was broad agreement in Afghanistan that the war should end, but how it should happen was a major issue for the candidates of the 2009 Afghan presidential election that re-elected Karzai. In a televised speech after being elected, Karzai called on "our Taliban brothers to come home and embrace their land" and laid plans to launch a loya jirga. Efforts were undermined by the Obama administration's increase of American troops in the country. Karzai reiterated in January 2010 that he wanted to reach out to the Taliban to lay down arms. US Secretary of State Hillary Clinton cautiously supported the proposal.

January 2009 brought a change in American leadership, with the inauguration of President Barack Obama. That month, US soldiers, alongside Afghan Federal Guards, moved into the provinces of Logar, Wardak, and Kunar. The troops were the first wave of an expected surge of reinforcements originally ordered by Bush and increased by Obama. In mid-February 2009, it was announced that 17,000 additional troops would be deployed in two brigades and support troops; the 2nd Marine Expeditionary Brigade of about 3,500 and the 5th Brigade, 2nd Infantry Division, a Stryker brigade with about 4,000. ISAF commander General David McKiernan had called for as many as 30,000 additional troops, effectively doubling the number of troops. On 23 September, a classified assessment by McChrystal included his conclusion that a successful counterinsurgency strategy would require 500,000 troops and five years.

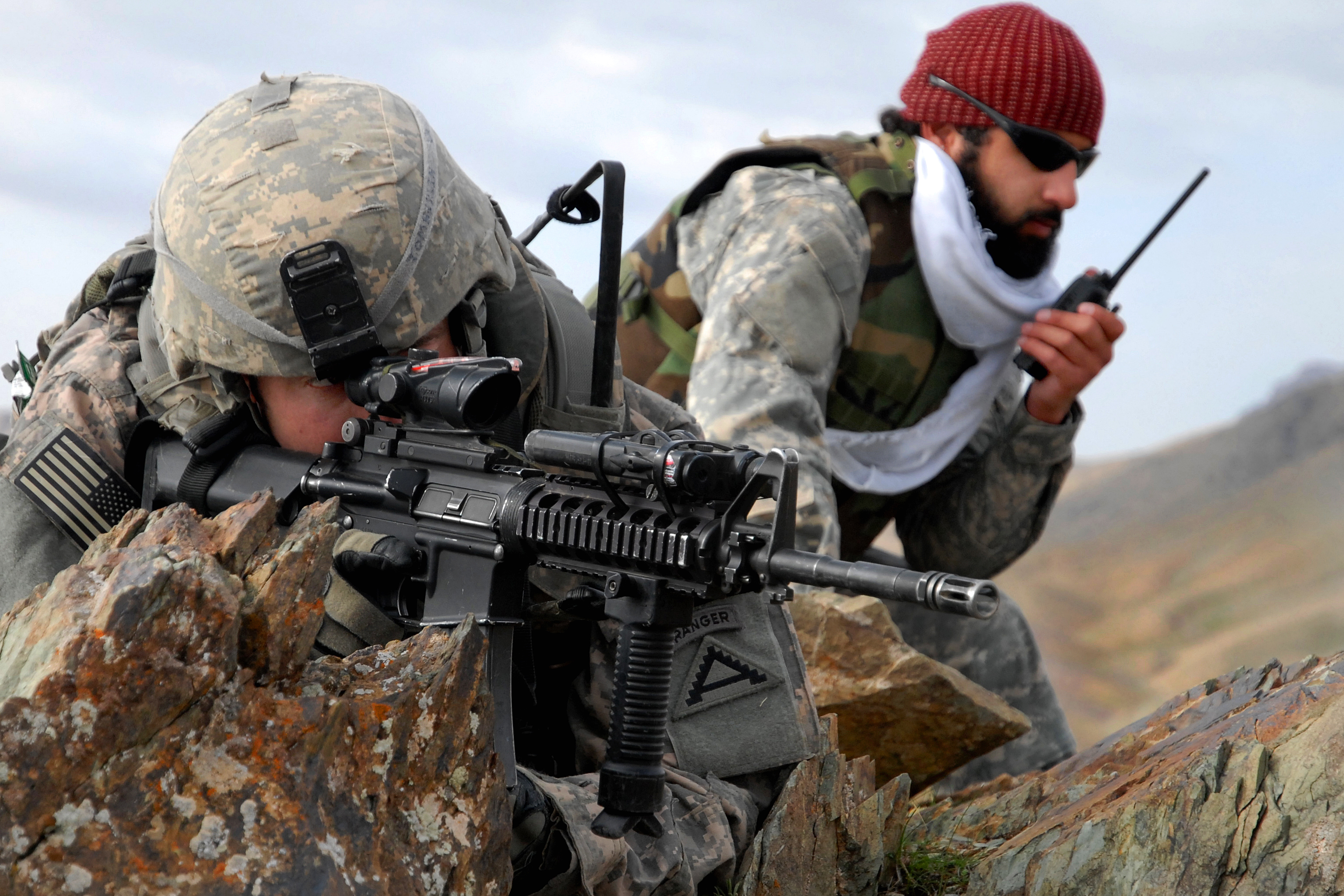
A US Army Soldier and an Afghan interpreter in Zabul, 2009

Pakistani drone strikes against Taliban and al-Qaeda militants increased substantially under Obama. Some in the media referred to the attacks as a "drone war." In August 2009, Baitullah Mehsud, the leader of the Tehrik-i-Taliban Pakistan was killed in a drone strike.

June 2009 brought Operation Strike of the Sword in Helmand. It followed a British-led operation named Operation Panther's Claw in the same region, which was aimed to secure various canal and river crossings to establish a long-term ISAF presence.

On 4 September 2009, during the Kunduz Province Campaign a devastating NATO air raid was conducted southwest of Kunduz, where Taliban fighters had hijacked civilian supply trucks, killing up to 179 people, including over 100 civilians.

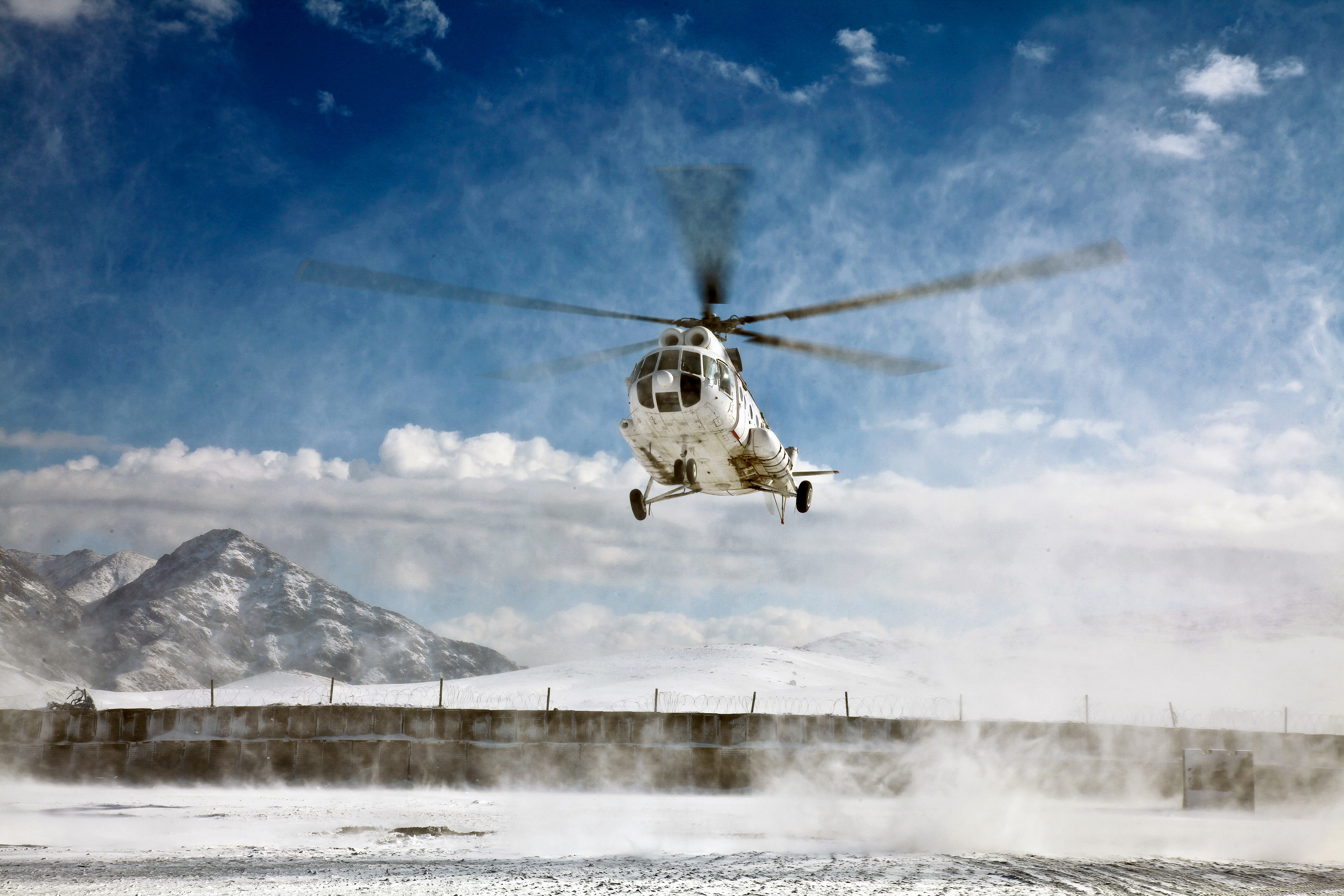
Russian made Mil Mi-8 chopper landing at Forward Operating Base Airborne to deliver mail and supplies, 2009

After Karzai's alleged win of 54% in 2009, which would prevent a runoff, over 400,000 Karzai votes had to be disallowed after accusations of fraud. Some nations criticized the elections as "free but not fair." The Taliban's claim that the over 135 violent incidents disrupted elections was largely disputed. However, the media was asked to not report any violent incidents. In southern Afghanistan, where the Taliban held the most power, voter turnout was low and sporadic violence was directed at voters and security personnel. The Taliban released a video days after the elections, filming on the road between Kabul and Kandahar, stopping vehicles and asking to see their fingers (voters were marked by dipping their fingers in ink so they could not double vote). The video went showed ten men who had voted, listening to a Taliban militant. The Taliban pardoned the voters because of Ramadan. The Taliban attacked towns with rockets and other indirect fire. Amid claims of widespread fraud, both top contenders, Karzai and Abdullah Abdullah, claimed victory. Reports suggested that turnout was lower than in the prior election. On 26 November, Karzai made a public plea for direct negotiations with the Taliban leadership, saying there was an "urgent need" for negotiations and made it clear that the Obama administration had opposed such talks. There was no formal US response.

In December 2009, an attack on Forward Operating Base Chapman, used by the CIA to gather information and to coordinate drone attacks against Taliban leaders, killed eight working for the CIA.

On 1 December 2009, Obama announced that the US would send 30,000 more troops. Antiwar organizations in the US responded quickly, and American cities saw protests on 2 December. Many protesters compared the decision to the expansion of the Vietnam War under Lyndon B. Johnson.

=== 2010–2011: Strategic agreements and death of Bin Laden ===
Deployment of additional US troops continued in early 2010, with 9,000 of the planned 30,000 in place before the end of March and another 18,000 expected by June. The surge in troops supported a sixfold increase in Special Forces operations. The surge of American personnel that began in late 2009 ended by September 2012. 700 airstrikes occurred in September 2010 alone versus 257 in all of 2009.

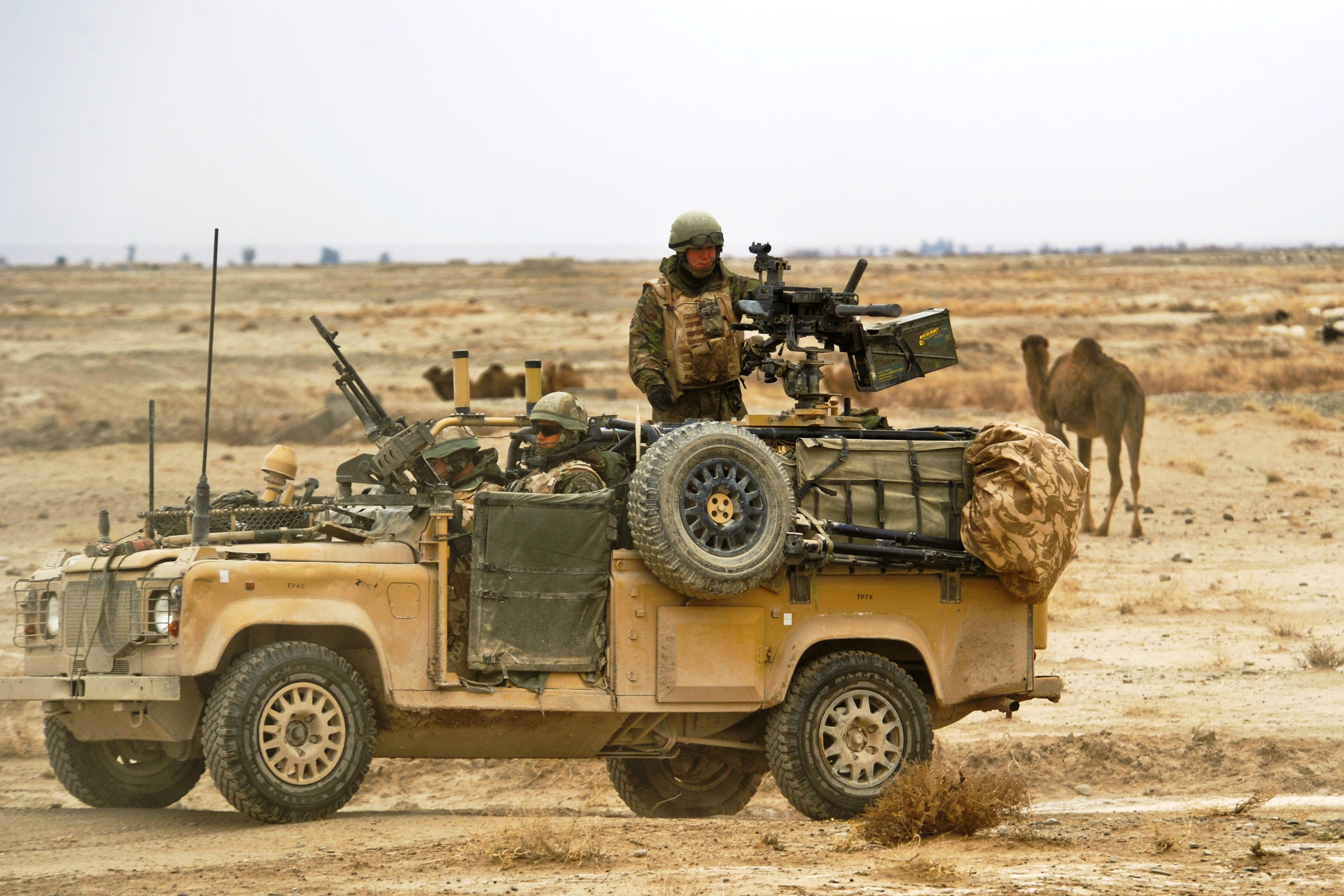
UK service members of the Royal Air Force Regiment stop on a road while conducting a combat mission near Kandahar Airfield, 2010

Due to increased use of IEDs by insurgents, the number of injured Coalition soldiers, mainly Americans, significantly increased. Beginning in May 2010, NATO special forces began to concentrate on operations to capture or kill specific Taliban leaders. As of March 2011, the US military claimed that the effort had resulted in the capture or killing of more than 900 low- to mid-level Taliban commanders. Overall, 2010 saw the most insurgent attacks of any year since the war began, peaking in September at more than 1,500.

In February 2010, approximately 15,000 Afghan and ISAF personnel launched Operation Moshtarak in central Helmand, principally around Marjah and Nad Ali District. The operation sought to clear Taliban strongholds and extend Afghan government authority through a counterinsurgency campaign combining security operations with stabilization and governance efforts. Coalition and Afghan forces made initial gains, but insurgent intimidation continued and the establishment of effective security and governance remained incomplete.

The "Peace Jirga" was held in Kabul, attended by 1,600 delegates, in June 2010. However, the Taliban and the Hezb-i Islami Gulbuddin, who were both invited by Karzai as a gesture of goodwill did not attend the conference. The Taliban's co-founder and then-second-in-command, Abdul Ghani Baradar, was one of the leading Taliban members who favored talks with the US and Afghan governments. Karzai's administration reportedly held talks with Baradar in February; however, later that month, Baradar was captured in a joint US-Pakistani raid in Karachi, Pakistan. The arrest infuriated Karzai and invoked suspicions that he was seized because the Pakistani intelligence community was opposed to Afghan peace talks. Karzai started peace talks with Haqqani Network groups in March.

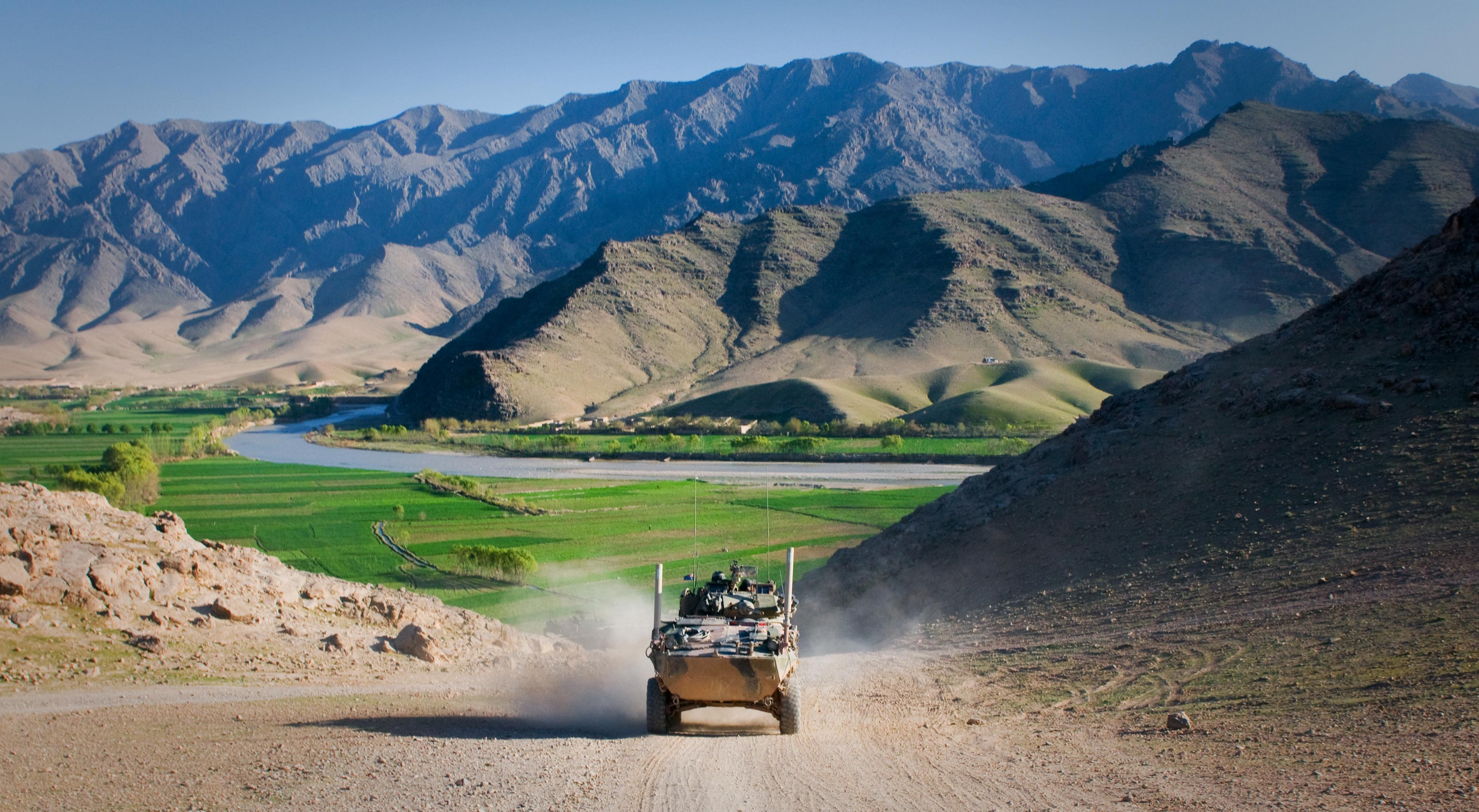
An Australian service light armored vehicle drives through Tangi Valley, 2011

In 2010, the Obama administration decided to allow possible political negotiations to solve the war. The Taliban themselves had refused to speak to the Afghan government, portraying them as an American "puppet." Sporadic efforts for peace talks between the US and the Taliban occurred afterward, and it was reported in October that Taliban leadership commanders (the "Quetta Shura") had left their haven in Pakistan and been safely escorted to Kabul by NATO aircraft for talks, with the assurance that NATO staff would not apprehend them. After the talks concluded, it emerged that the leader of this delegation, who claimed to be Akhtar Mansour, the second-in-command of the Taliban, was actually an imposter who had duped NATO officials.

On 25 July 2010, the release of 91,731 classified documents from the WikiLeaks organization was made public. The documents cover US military incident and intelligence reports from January 2004 to December 2009. Some of these documents included sanitized, and "covered up", accounts of civilian casualties caused by Coalition Forces. The reports included many references to other incidents involving civilian casualties like the Kunduz airstrike and Nangar Khel incident. The leaked documents also contain reports of Pakistan collusion with the Taliban. According to Der Spiegel, "the documents clearly show that the Pakistani intelligence agency Inter-Services Intelligence (ISI) is the most important accomplice the Taliban has outside of Afghanistan."

On 2 May 2011, US officials announced that bin Laden had been killed in Operation Neptune Spear, conducted by the US Navy SEALs in Abbottabad, Pakistan. Pakistan came under intense international scrutiny after the raid. The Pakistani government denied that it had sheltered bin Laden, and said it had shared information with the CIA and other intelligence agencies about the compound since 2009.

The 2011 Battle of Kandahar was part of an offensive that followed a 30 April announcement that the Taliban would launch their spring offensive. On 7 May, the Taliban launched a major offensive on government buildings in Kandahar. The BBC called it "the worst attack in Kandahar Province since [2001], and an embarrassment for the [Afghan] government."

Karzai confirmed in June 2011 that secret talks were taking place between the US and the Taliban, but these collapsed by August.

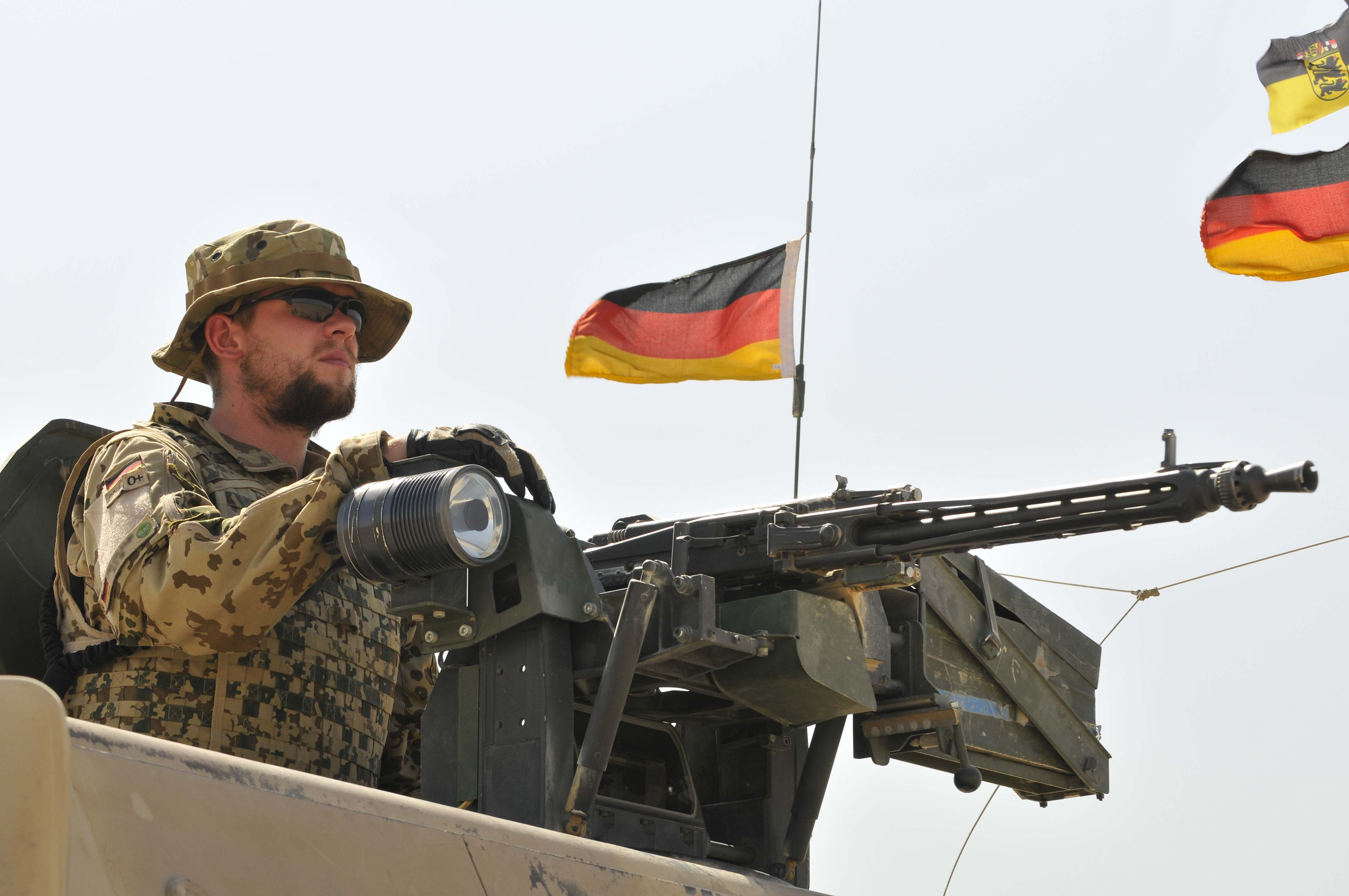
A German Bundeswehr soldier, part of ISAF's Regional Command North at Camp Marmal, 2011

On 22 June 2011, Obama announced that 10,000 troops would be withdrawn by the end of the year, and an additional 23,000 troops would return by the summer of 2012. After the withdrawal of 10,000 US troops, 80,000 remained. In 2011, Canada withdrew its combat troops, transitioning to a training role. Following suit, other NATO countries announced troop reductions. Taliban attacks continued at the same rate as they did in 2011, around 28,000 in 2013.

Tensions between Pakistan and the US increased in late September 2011, after several Pakistan Frontier Corps soldiers were killed and wounded. The troops were attacked by a US piloted aircraft that was pursuing Taliban forces near the Afghan-Pakistan border, but for unknown reasons, opened fire on two Pakistan border posts. In retaliation, Pakistan closed the Torkham ground border crossing to NATO supply convoys for an unspecified period. This incident followed the release of a video allegedly showing uniformed Pakistan soldiers executing unarmed civilians. After the border closing, Pakistani Taliban attacked NATO convoys, killing several drivers, and destroying around 100 tankers. ISAF forces skirmished Pakistan's armed forces on 26 November, killing 24 Pakistani soldiers. Each side claimed the other shot first. Pakistan blocked NATO supply lines and ordered Americans to leave Shamsi Airfield.

=== 2012–2013: US troop incidents, Obama-Karzai meetings ===
US Army Soldiers walk by local Afghan boys during a patrol in Gardez, 2012

Beginning in January 2012, incidents involving US troops occurred that were described by The Sydney Morning Herald as "a series of damaging incidents and disclosures involving US troops in Afghanistan." These incidents fractured the partnership between Afghanistan and ISAF, raised the question whether discipline within US troops was breaking down, undermined "the image of foreign forces in a country where there is already deep resentment owing to civilian deaths and a perception among many Afghans that US troops lack respect for Afghan culture and people" and strained relations between Afghanistan and the US. Besides an incident involving US troops who posed with body parts of dead insurgents and a video apparently showing a US helicopter crew blasting a group of Afghan men with a Hellfire missile, these "high-profile US military incidents in Afghanistan" also included the 2012 Afghanistan Quran burning protests and the Panjwai shooting spree.

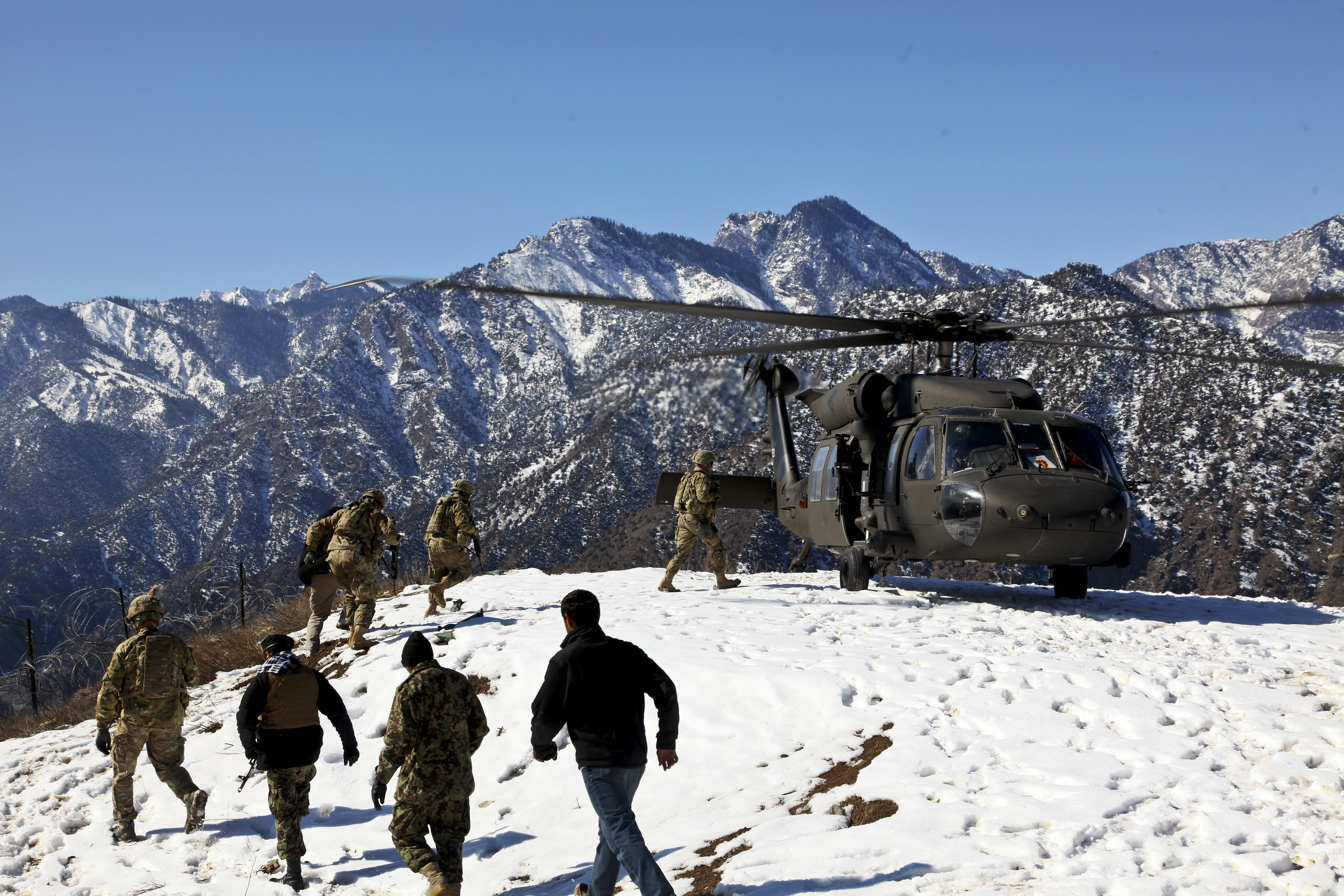
US Army soldiers boarding a Black Hawk in Nari District, near the Pakistani border, 2012

Karzai visited the US in January 2012. At the time, the US stated its openness to withdrawing all of its troops by the end of 2014. Karzai and Obama agreed to transfer combat operations from NATO to Afghan forces by spring 2013 rather than summer 2013. "What's going to happen this spring is that Afghans will be in the lead throughout the country", Obama said. "They [ISAF forces] will still be fighting alongside Afghan troops...we will be in a training, assisting, advising role." He also stated the reason of the withdrawals that "We achieved our central goal, or have come very close...which is to de-capacitate al-Qaeda" and making sure that "they can't attack us again." He added that any US mission beyond 2014 would focus solely on counterterrorism operations and training.

In 2012, the leaders of NATO-member countries endorsed an exit strategy during the NATO Summit. ISAF Forces would transfer command of all combat missions to Afghan forces by the middle of 2013, while shifting from combat to advising, training and assisting Afghan security forces. Most of the 130,000 ISAF troops would depart by the end of December 2014, and a new NATO mission would then assume the support role.

Troops from the 31st and 33rd Kandak, Afghan National Army, execute a departure for Operation Valley Flood, 2012

Further attempts to resume talks were canceled in March 2012 and June 2013, following a dispute between Afghanistan and the Taliban regarding the latter's opening of a political office in Qatar. Karzai accused the Taliban of portraying themselves as a government-in-exile.

On 2 May 2012, Karzai and Obama signed a strategic partnership agreement between the two countries, after the latter had arrived unannounced in Kabul. On 7 July, as part of the agreement, the US designated Afghanistan a major non-NATO ally after Karzai and Clinton met in Kabul. Both leaders agreed that the US would transfer Afghan prisoners and prisons to the Afghan government and withdraw troops from Afghan villages in spring 2013.

On 18 June 2013, the transfer of security responsibilities from NATO to Afghan forces was completed. ISAF remained slated to end its mission by the end of 2014. Some 100,000 ISAF forces remained in the country.

=== 2014–2015: Withdrawal and increase of insurgency ===
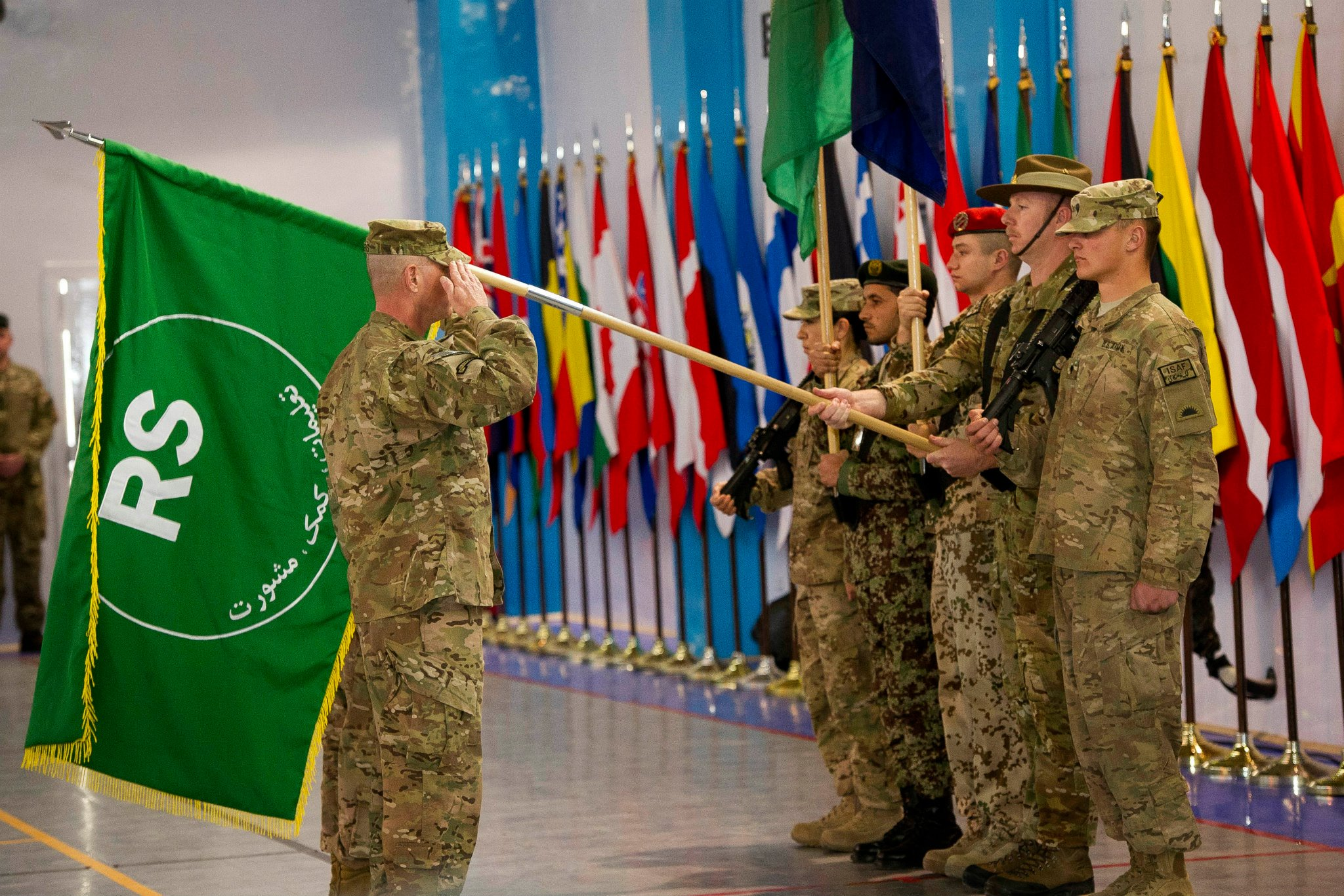
Resolute Support Colors presented at Kabul on 28 December 2014, after the ISAF colors are encased

The UK and the US officially ended their combat operation in Afghanistan on 26 October 2014. The UK handed over its last base in Afghanistan, Camp Bastion, and the US handed over its last base, Camp Leatherneck, to Afghan forces. Around 500 UK troops remained in "non-combat" roles. On 28 December, NATO officially ended combat operations in a ceremony held in Kabul. Continued operations by US forces within Afghanistan were under Operation Freedom's Sentinel; and the new NATO mission was Operation Resolute Support. The withdrawal of troops did not mean the withdrawal of military presence. As US troops withdrew from Afghanistan, they were replaced by military contractors hired by the US and UN. Many of these contractors consisted of ex-Coalition military personnel. This allowed the US and British to continue to be involved in ground actions without the requirement to station their own forces.

The Taliban began a resurgence due to several factors. The withdrawal of most foreign forces from Afghanistan reduced the risk the Taliban faced of being bombed and raided. In June 2014, Pakistan launched Operation Zarb-e-Azb in the North Waziristan tribal area, and dislodged thousands of mainly Uzbek, Arab, and Pakistani militants, who flooded into Afghanistan and swelled the Taliban's ranks. The group was further emboldened by the relative lack of interest from the international community, as attention was given to crises in Syria, Iraq, and Ukraine. Afghan security forces lacked, among other things, air power and reconnaissance. The political infighting in Kabul, and the apparent weakness in governance at different levels, were exploited by the Taliban. The Taliban expanded governance in the areas under their control, attempting to build local-level legitimacy. Their governance strategy rested in particular on the provision of justice, which was often viewed as less corrupt than the courts of the government.

Heavy fighting occurred in Kunduz Province, which was the site of clashes from 2009 onwards. In May 2015, flights into the Kunduz city were suspended due to weeks of clashes between the Afghan security forces and the Taliban outside the city. The intensifying conflict in the Northern Char Dara District within Kunduz Province led the Afghan government to enlist local militia fighters to bolster opposition to the Taliban insurgency. In June, the Taliban intensified attacks around Kunduz city as part of a major offensive to try and capture it; tens of thousands of inhabitants were displaced internally. The government recaptured the Char Dara district after roughly a month of fighting.

In late September, Taliban forces launched an attack on Kunduz city, seizing outlying villages and entering the city. The Taliban stormed the regional hospital and clashed with security forces at the nearby university. The fighting saw the Taliban attack from four different districts: Char Dara to the west, Aliabad to the southwest, Khanabad to the east, and Imam Saheb to the north. The Taliban took the Zakhel and Ali Khel villages on the highway leading south, which connects the city to Kabul and Mazar-e Sharif through Aliabad district. They reportedly made their largest gains in the southwest of Kunduz, where some armed local communities had started supporting the Taliban. Taliban fighters had allegedly blocked the route to the airport, to prevent civilians fleeing the city. One witness reported that the headquarters of the National Directorate of Security was set on fire.

In January 2015, the Islamic State caliphate (IS) established a branch in Afghanistan called Khorasan (ISIS-K), and began recruiting fighters and clashing with the Taliban. It was created after pledging allegiance to the self-assumed worldwide caliph Abu Bakr al-Baghdadi. On 18 March, Hafiz Wahidi, IS' replacement deputy Emir in Afghanistan, was killed by the Afghan Armed Forces, along with 9 other IS militants accompanying him.

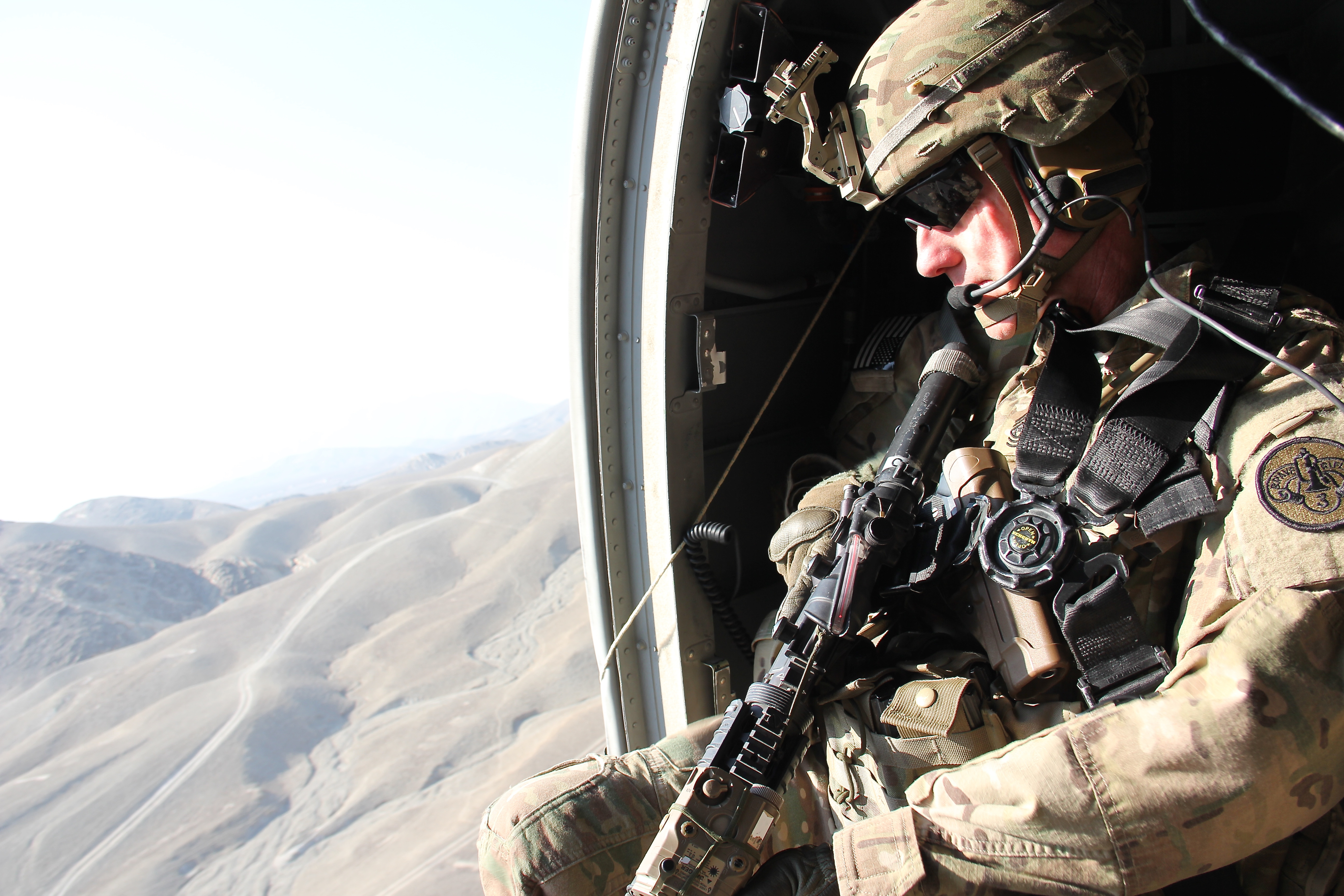
US Army soldier in Nangarhar Province, 2015

In 2015, the Taliban began an offensive that took over parts of Helmand Province. By June, they had seized control of Dishu and Baghran killing 5,588 Afghan government security forces (3,720 of them were police officers). By the end of July, the Taliban had overrun Nawzad District and on 26 August, the Taliban took control of Musa Qala. In October, Taliban forces had attempted to take Lashkar Gah, the capital of Helmand province. The Afghan 215th Corps and special operations forces launched a counteroffensive against the Taliban in November, Whilst the assault was repelled, Taliban forces remained dug into the city's suburbs as of December 2015.

On 22 June 2015, the Taliban detonated a car bomb outside the National Assembly in Kabul, and attacked the building with assault rifles and RPGs. The bombing highlighted differences within the Taliban in their approach to peace talks.

In July 2015, Pakistan hosted the first official peace talks between Taliban representatives and the Afghan government. The US and China attended the talks brokered by Pakistan in Murree as two observers. In January 2016, Pakistan hosted a round of four-way talks with Afghan, Chinese and American officials, but the Taliban did not attend. The Taliban did hold informal talks with the Afghan government in 2016. China's reason for the negotiation was that Afghan security situation affected its own separatist groups, and economic activity with Pakistan. The Taliban declined.

On 11 November 2015, it was reported that in Zabul Province, Taliban fighters loyal to the new Taliban leader Mullah Akhtar Mansoor fought a pro-IS splinter faction of the Taliban led by Mullah Mansoor Dadullah. Even though Dadullah's faction enjoyed the support of foreign IS fighters, including Uzbeks and Chechens, Mansoor's loyalists reportedly had the upper hand. According to a Zabul Province official, more than 100 militants from both sides were killed in the conflict. The infighting stifled peace talks.

The infighting caused Mansoor to be consumed with a campaign to quell dissent against his leadership; this led Sirajuddin Haqqani, then-chief of the Haqqani Network, to be selected as the deputy leader of the Taliban in summer 2015. Sirajuddin and other Haqqani leaders increasingly ran the Taliban's day-to-day military operations, notably organizing urban terrorist attacks, and building a complex international fundraising network. They also appointed Taliban governors, and began uniting the Taliban. As a result, the Haqqani Network, mostly autonomous until then, became deeply integrated with the Taliban, and grew in influence within the insurgency. Tensions with the Pakistani military grew because American and Afghan officials accused them of sheltering the Haqqanis as a proxy group.

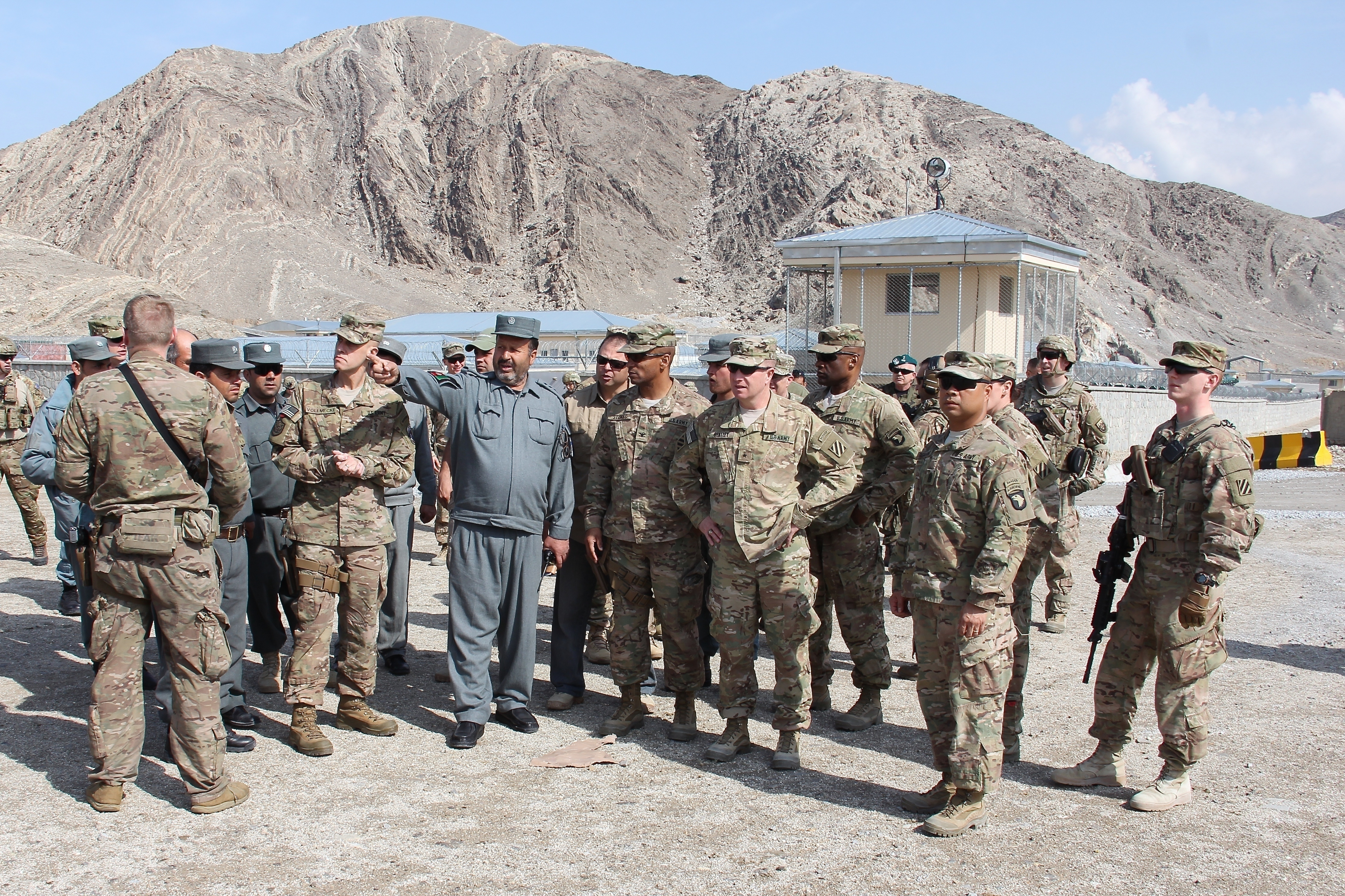
TAAC-E advisers in 2015

December 2015 saw a renewed Taliban offensive in Helmand focused on the town of Sangin. The Sangin district fell to the Taliban on 21 December after fierce clashes that killed more than 90 soldiers in two days. It was reported that 30 members of the SAS, alongside 60 US special forces operators, joined the Afghan Army in the battle to retake parts of Sangin from Taliban insurgents. In addition, about 300 US troops and a small number of British remained in Helmand to advise Afghan commanders at the corps level. Senior American commanders said that the Afghan troops in the province had lacked effective leaders, as well as the necessary weapons and ammunition to hold off persistent Taliban attacks. Some Afghan soldiers in Helmand had fought in tough conditions for years without getting to see their families, causing poor morale and high desertion.

Peace movements started arising in Afghanistan, including the Tabassum movement in 2015, the Enlightenment Movement during 2016–17, Uprising for Change in 2017, and the People's Peace Movement in 2018.

=== 2016–2017: Collapse of peace talks, emergence of Islamic State ===
In January 2016, the US government granted the Pentagon new legal authority for a US offensive against ISIS-K-affiliated militants, following the State Department designating IS in Afghanistan and Pakistan as a foreign terrorist organization. The number of militants started with around 60 or 70, with most of them coming over the Pakistani border, but eventually ranged between 1,000 and 3,000 militants. They were mainly defectors from the Afghan and the Pakistani Taliban, and were generally confined to Nangarhar Province, and partially, Kunar Province.

In early February 2016, Taliban insurgents renewed their assault on Sangin, after previously being repulsed in December 2015, launching many strong attacks on Afghan government forces earlier in the month. As a result, the US sent troops from the 2nd Battalion, 87th Infantry Regiment, and 10th Mountain Division to prop up the Afghan 215th Corps in Helmand Province, particularly around Sangin, joining US special ops forces already in the area. On 14 March 2016, Khanneshin District in Helmand Province fell to the Taliban; and district by district, Afghan troops were retreating back to urban centers in Helmand. In early April 2016, 600 Afghan troops launched a major offensive to retake Taliban-occupied areas in and around Sangin. An Afghan army offensive to retake the town of Khanisheen was repelled by the Taliban, and desertions in the army were rife.

Despite US airstrikes, militants besieged Lashkar Gah, reportedly controlling all roads leading to the city and areas a few kilometres away. The US stepped up airstrikes in support of Afghan ground forces. Afghan forces in the city were reported as "exhausted", whilst police checkpoints around the capital were falling one by one. Meanwhile, the Taliban sent a new elite commando force into Helmand called "Sara Khitta" in Pashto. Afghan security forces repelled attacks by Taliban fighters encroaching on Chah-e-Anji nearby Lashkar Gah; Afghan special forces backed by US airstrikes battled increasingly well-armed and disciplined Taliban militants. An Afghan special forces commander said: "The Taliban have heavily armed, uniformed units that are equipped with night vision and modern weapons."

On 10 March 2016, officials said that the Taliban clashed with a Taliban splinter group (led by Muhammad Rasul) in the Shindand district of Herat, and up to 100 militants were killed.

In April 2016, Afghan president Ashraf Ghani ended his' governments failing effort to start peace talks with the Taliban. Additionally, due to the integration of Haqqani Networks into the Taliban leadership, it would become harder for peace talks to take place. Although leader of the Taliban, Haibatullah Akhundzada, said a peace agreement was possible if the Kabul government renounced its foreign allies.

On 23 July 2016, Afghan and US forces began an offensive to clear Nangarhar Province of IS militants hours after the Kabul bombing. The operation was dubbed "Wrath of the Storm", involving both Afghan regular army and special forces, and was the Afghan army's first major offensive that summer. The estimated size of ISIS-K in January 2016 was around 3,000, but by July, it had dropped to around 1,000 to 1,500, with 70% of its fighters coming from the TTP.

As of July 2016, at least an estimated 20% of Afghanistan was under Taliban control, with southernmost Helmand Province as a major stronghold, while General John Nicholson stated that Afghan Armed Forces' casualties had risen 20% compared to 2015. On 22 August, the US announced that 100 US troops were sent to Lashkar Gah to help prevent the Taliban from overrunning it, in what Brigadier General Charles Cleveland called a "temporary effort" to advise Afghan police.

On 22 September 2016, the Afghan government signed a draft peace deal with Hezb-i-Islami.

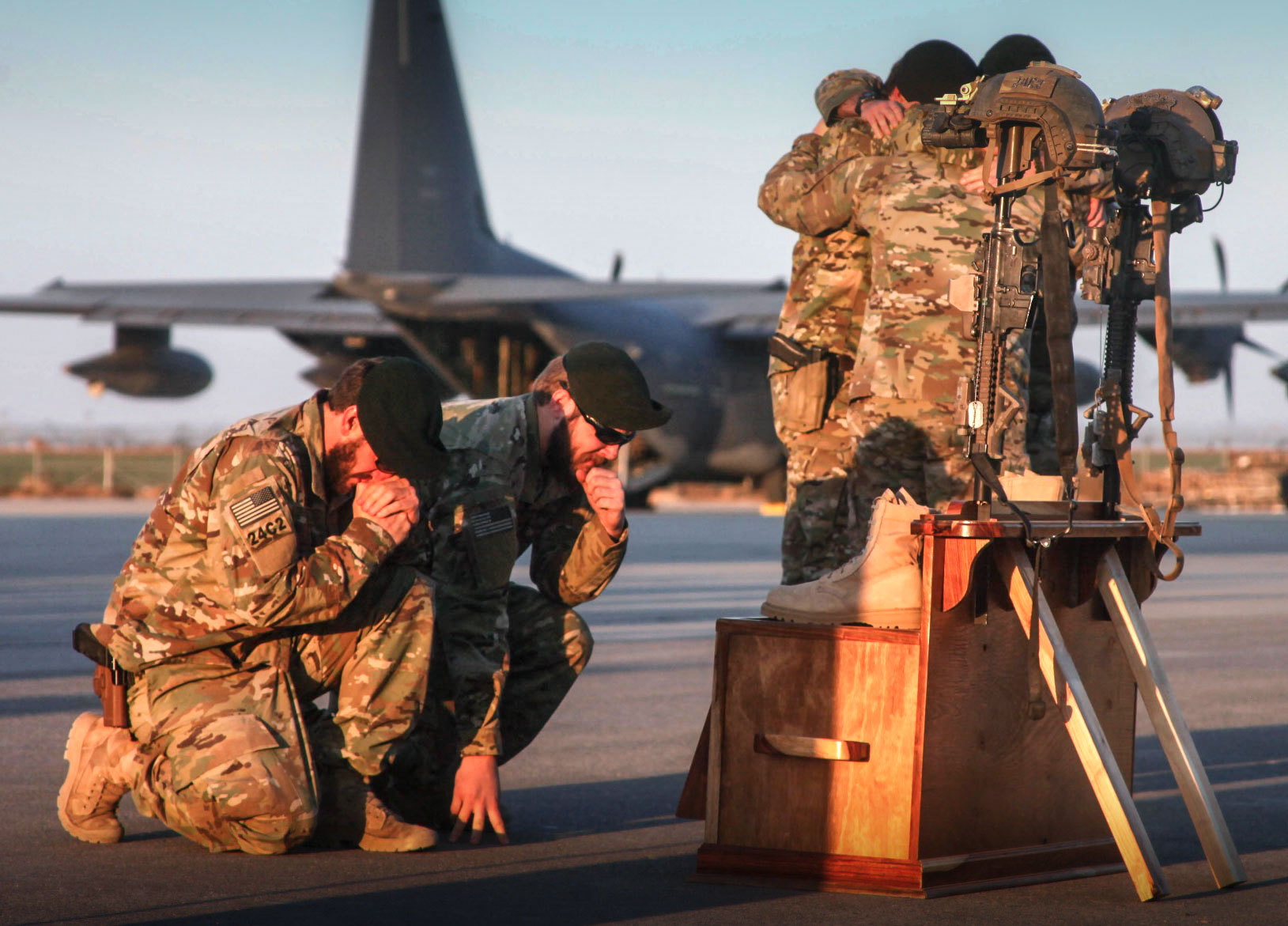
Green Berets of the 10th SFG memorialize two comrades who were killed in action during the Battle of Boz Qandahari in 2016

On 31 December 2016, the Taliban continued their assault on the province with attacks on Sangin and Marjah districts. Some estimated suggest the Taliban had retaken more than 80% of Helmand province.

In early January 2017, the Marine Corps Times reported that Afghan forces sought to rebuild, following an exhausting 2016 fighting season; 33 districts, spread across 16 Afghan provinces, were under insurgent control whilst 258 were under government control and nearly 120 districts remained "contested." The Afghan army reportedly had about 169,000 soldiers, but in 2016, suffered a 33% attrition rate—a 7% increase from 2015.

In early March 2017, American and Afghan forces launched Operation Hamza to "flush" ISIS-K from its stronghold in eastern Afghanistan, engaging in regular ground battles. In April 2017, a NATO spokesman said that Afghan and international forces had reduced ISIS-K controlled territory in Afghanistan by two-thirds, and had killed around half their fighters in two years. Since the beginning of 2017, 460 airstrikes against terrorists (with drone strikes alone killing more than 200 IS militants); he added that the affiliate had an estimated 600–800 fighters in two eastern Afghan provinces.

On 23 March 2017, Sangin district was captured by the Taliban, as they had overrun the district center of the town of Sangin. During the earlier phase of the war, almost a quarter of British casualties were caused by fighting for the town, while more recently hundreds of Afghan troops died defending it. On 29 April, the US deployed an additional 5,000 Marines to southern Helmand Province.

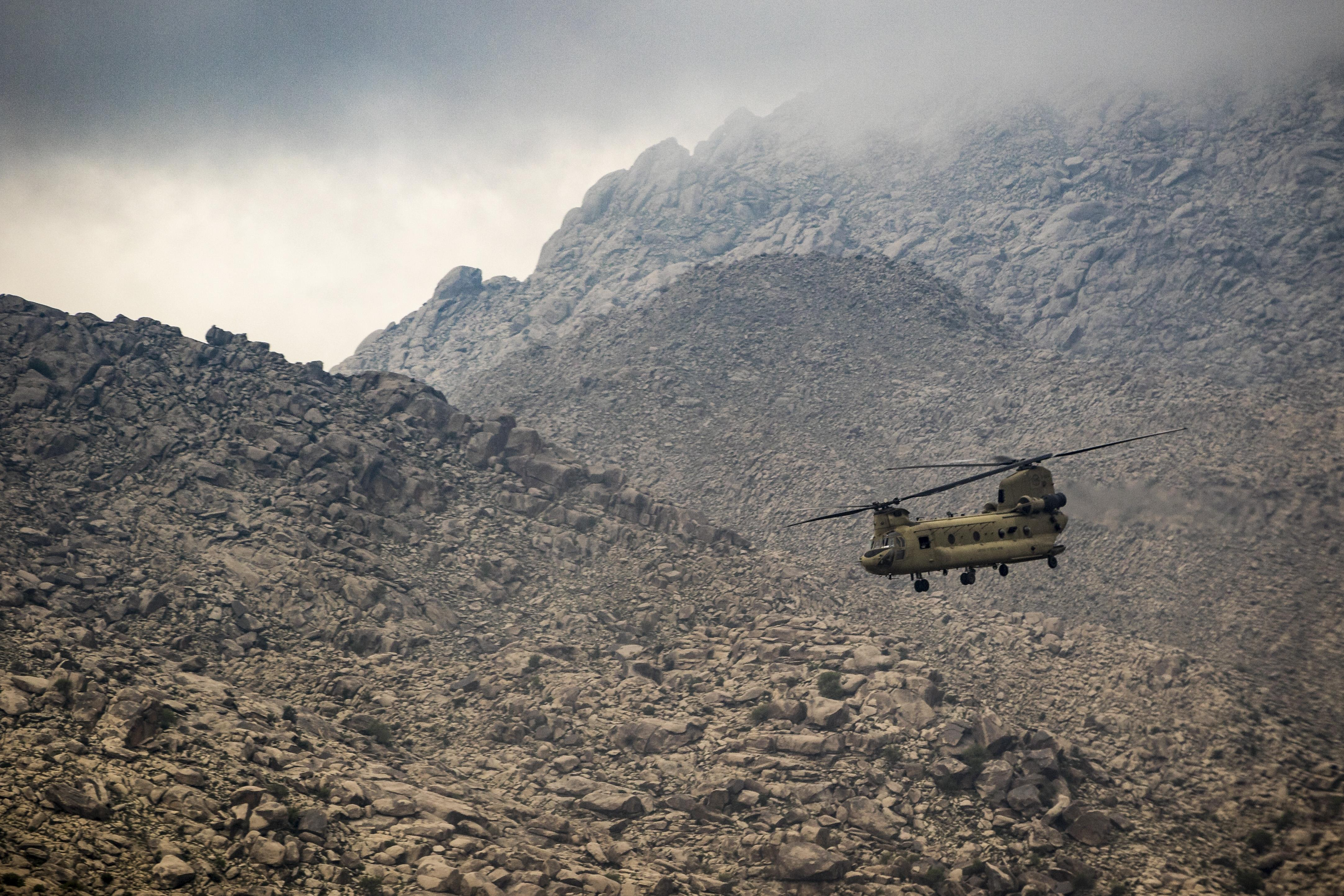
US Army pilots fly a CH-47 Chinook in Nangarhar, 2017

On 21 April 2017, the Taliban attacked Camp Shaheen near Mazar-e-Sharif, killing over 140 Afghan soldiers.

On 15 September 2017, it was reported that the CIA was seeking authority to conduct its own drone strikes in Afghanistan and other war zones, according to current and former intelligence and military officials, and that the change in authority was being considered by the White House as part of the new strategy despite concerns by the Pentagon. On 19 September, the Trump administration deployed another 3,000 US troops to Afghanistan, adding to the roughly 11,000 US troops already there. On 4 October, Defense Secretary Jim Mattis approved a change in rules of engagement as part of the new strategy so that there was no longer a requirement for US troops to be in contact with enemy forces in Afghanistan before opening fire.

On 20 November 2017, General Nicholson announced that US and Afghan airstrikes were targeting Taliban-run drug production facilities in Afghanistan, under a new strategy aimed at cutting off Taliban funding, saying that the latter was "becoming a criminal organization" that was earning about $200 million a year from drug-related activities. Ghani strongly endorsed the airstrikes.

=== 2018–2019: Peace overtures ===
Map showing the war as of January 2019 Under control of the Afghan Government, NATO, and Allies Under control of the Taliban, Al-Qaeda, and Allies Under control of the Islamic State of Iraq and the Levant (ISIL) and Allies Under control of the Pakistani Army

In January 2018, the Taliban were openly active in 70% of the country (being in full control of 14 districts and have an active and open physical presence in a further 263) and IS was more active in the country than ever before. Following recent attacks by the Taliban (including the Kabul ambulance bombing on 27 January) and IS that killed scores of civilians, U.S. president Donald Trump and Afghan officials decided to rule out any talks with the Taliban. However, on 27 February, following an increase in violence, Ghani proposed unconditional peace talks with the Taliban, offering them recognition as a legal political party and the release of the Taliban prisoners. The offer was the most favorable to the Taliban since the war started. It was preceded by months of national consensus building, which found that Afghans overwhelmingly supported a negotiated end to the war. Two days earlier, the Taliban had called for talks with the US. On 27 March, a conference of 20 countries in Tashkent, Uzbekistan, backed the Afghan government's peace offer. The Taliban did not publicly respond.

Following Ghani's offer of unconditional peace talks with the Taliban, a growing peace movement arose in Afghanistan during 2018, particularly following a peace march by the People's Peace Movement, which the Afghan media dubbed the "Helmand Peace Convoy." The marchers walked several hundred kilometers from Lashkar Gah in Helmand Province, through Taliban-held territory, to Kabul. There, they met Ghani, and held sit-in protests outside the UN Assistance Mission in Afghanistan (UNAMA) and nearby embassies. Their efforts inspired further movements in other parts of Afghanistan. Following the march, Ghani and the Taliban agreed a mutual, unprecedented, ceasefire during Eid al-Fitr celebrations in June. During the ceasefire, Taliban members flocked into Kabul, where they communicated with locals and state security forces. Creating a mood of both hope and fear, many civilians welcomed the Taliban and spoke about peace. Although civilians called for the ceasefire to be made permanent, the Taliban rejected an extension and resumed fighting after the ceasefire ended on 18 June, while the Afghan government's ceasefire ended a week later.

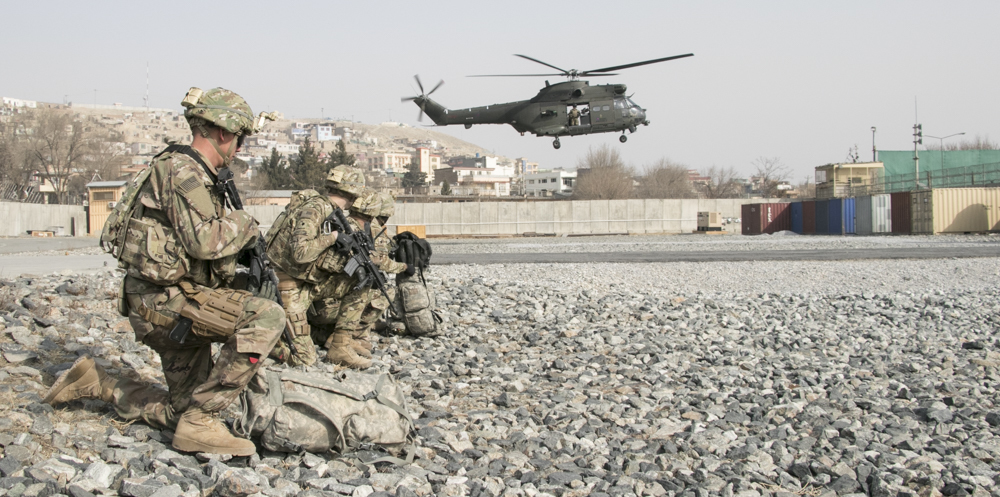
US, British and Afghan security forces train together in an aerial reaction force exercise at Camp Qargha in Kabul, 2018

American officials secretly met members of the Taliban's political commission in Qatar in July 2018. In September 2018, Trump appointed Zalmay Khalilzad as special adviser on Afghanistan in the US State Department, with the stated goal of facilitating an intra-Afghan political peace process. Khalilzad led further talks between the US and the Taliban in Qatar in October. Russia hosted a separate peace talk in November between the Taliban and officials from Afghanistan's High Peace Council. The talks in Qatar resumed in December, though the Taliban refused to allow the Afghan government to be invited, considering them a puppet government of the US. The Taliban spoke with Afghans, including Karzai, in Moscow in February 2019, but again these talks did not include the Afghan government.

In July 2018, the Taliban carried out the Darzab offensive and captured Darzab District, following the surrender of ISIS-K to the Afghan government. In August, the Taliban launched a series of offensives. The largest was the Ghazni offensive, in which the Taliban assaulted the major city of Ghazni for several days, but eventually retreated.

On 25 January 2019, Ghani said that more than 45,000 members of the Afghan security forces had been killed since he became president in 2014. He also said that there had been fewer than 72 international casualties during the same period. A January 2019 report by the US estimated that 53.8% of Afghan districts were government control or influence, with 33.9% contested, and 12.3% under insurgent control or influence.

On 30 April 2019, Afghan government forces undertook clearing operations directed against both ISIS-K and the Taliban in eastern Nangarhar Province, after the two groups fought for more than a week over multiple villages in an area of illegal talc mining. The National Directorate of Security claimed 22 ISIS-K fighters were killed and two weapons caches destroyed, while the Taliban claimed Afghan forces killed seven civilians. On 28 July, Ghani's running mate Amrullah Saleh's office was attacked by a suicide bomber and a few militants. At least 20 people were killed; Saleh and 49 others were injured.

By August, the Taliban controlled more territory than at any point since 2001. Peace negotiations between the US and the Taliban failed in September.

On 25 February 2019, peace talks began between the Taliban and the US in Qatar, with Abdul Ghani Baradar notably present. After a pause in September, peace negotiations had resumed in December. This round of talks resulted in a seven-day partial ceasefire which began on 22 February 2020.

=== 2020: US–Taliban deal, beginning of US withdrawal ===
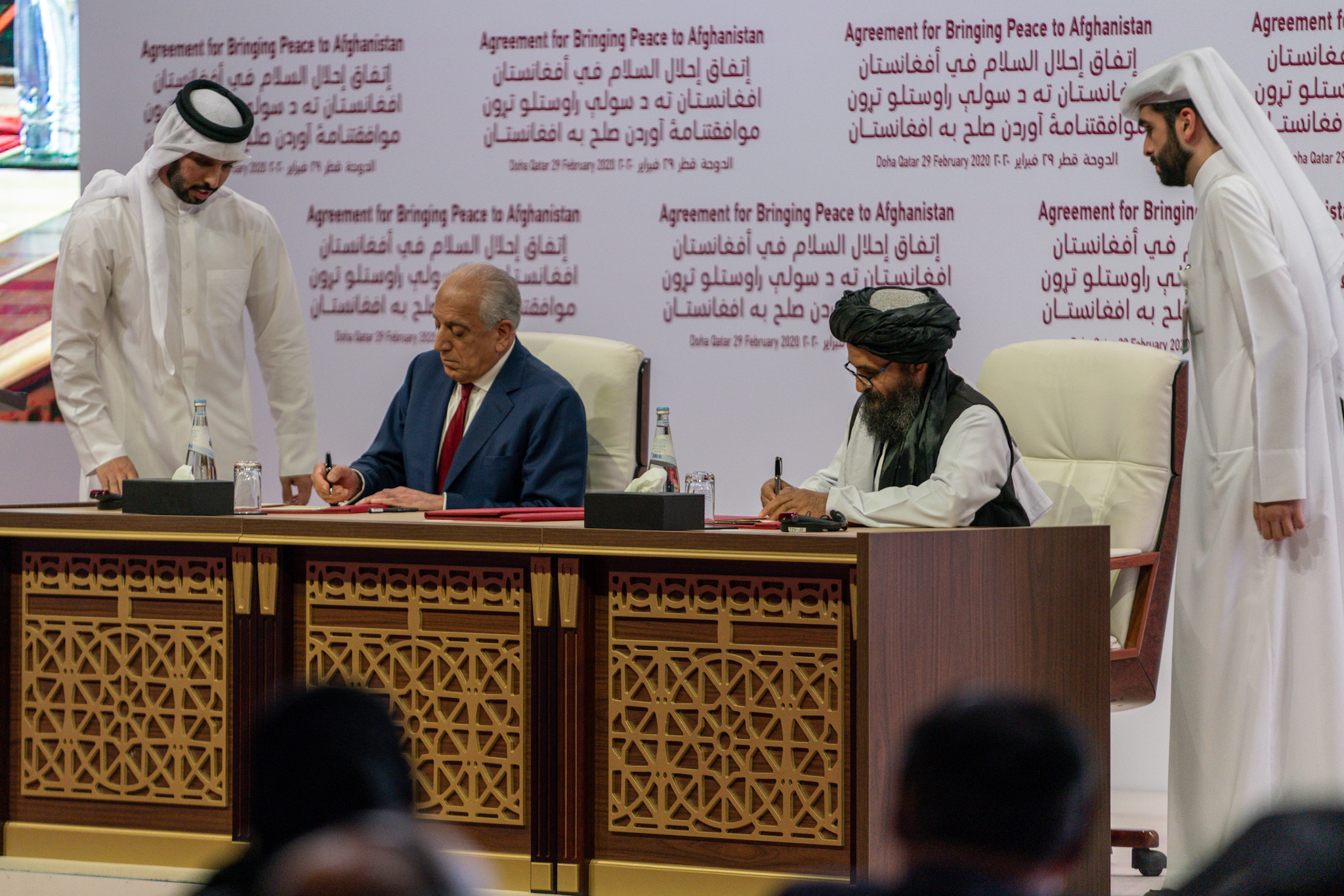
US representative Zalmay Khalilzad (left) and Taliban representative Abdul Ghani Baradar (right) sign the Agreement for Bringing Peace to Afghanistan on 29 February 2020

On 29 February 2020, the US and the Taliban signed a conditional peace deal in Doha, Qatar, that called for a prisoner exchange within ten days and was supposed to lead to US troops withdrawal from Afghanistan within 14 months. However, the Afghan government was not a party to the deal, and, in a press conference the next day, Ghani criticized the deal for being "signed behind closed doors." He said the Afghan government had "made no commitment to free 5,000 Taliban prisoners", and that such an action "is not the United States' authority", but rather Afghanistan's.

After signing the agreement with the US, the Taliban resumed offensive operations against the Afghan army and police on 3 March, conducting attacks in Kunduz and Helmand provinces. On 4 March, the US retaliated by launching an air strike against Taliban fighters in Helmand. Despite the peace agreement between the US and the Taliban, insurgent attacks against Afghan security forces reportedly surged in the country. In the 45 days after the agreement (1 March to 15 April), the Taliban conducted more than 4,500 attacks in Afghanistan, which showed an increase of more than 70% as compared to the same period in the previous year. More than 900 Afghan security forces were killed in the period, up from about 520 in the same period a year earlier. Because of a significant reduction in the number of offensives and airstrikes by Afghan and US forces against the Taliban due to the agreement, Taliban casualties dropped to 610 in the period down from about 1,660 in the same period a year earlier. Meanwhile, ISIS-K continued to be a threat on its own, killing 32 people in a mass shooting in Kabul on 6 March, killing 25 Sikh worshippers in Kabul on 25 March, and a series of attacks in May most notably killing 16 mothers and newborn babies in Kabul.

On 31 March 2020, a three-person Taliban delegation arrived in Kabul to discuss the release of prisoners, the first Taliban representatives to officially visit Kabul since 2001. On 7 April, the Taliban departed from the prisoner swap talks, which Taliban spokesman Suhail Shaheen said was unsuccessful. Shaheen tweeted hours later that the Taliban's negotiating team was recalled from Kabul. The Taliban failed to secure the release of any of the 15 commanders they sought to be released. Arguments over which prisoners to swap resulted in a delay of the planned prisoner swap. After a long delay due to disputes regarding prisoners' releases, the Afghan government had by August released 5,100 prisoners, and the Taliban had released 1,000. However, the Afghan government refused to release 400 prisoners that the Taliban requested be freed, as the prisoners were accused of serious crimes. Ghani also said he lacked the constitutional authority to release them, so he convened a loya jirga from 7 to 9 August to discuss the issue. The jirga agreed to free the 400. Talks between the Afghan government and the Taliban began in Doha on 12 September.

On 22 June, Afghanistan reported its "bloodiest week in 19 years", during which 291 members of the Afghan National Defense and Security Forces (ANDSF) were killed and 550 others wounded in 422 attacks carried out by the Taliban. At least 42 civilians, including women and children, were also killed and 105 others wounded. During the week, the Taliban kidnapped 60 civilians in central Daikundi Province.

=== 2021: End of US withdrawal, last Taliban offensive ===
The Taliban insurgency intensified considerably in 2021, coinciding with the withdrawal of US and allied troops from Afghanistan. On 6 March, Ghani expressed that his government would negotiate peace with the Taliban, discussing with them about holding new elections, and forming a government in a democratic manner. On 13 April, the Biden administration in the US announced that it would withdraw its remaining 2,500 troops from Afghanistan by 11 September.

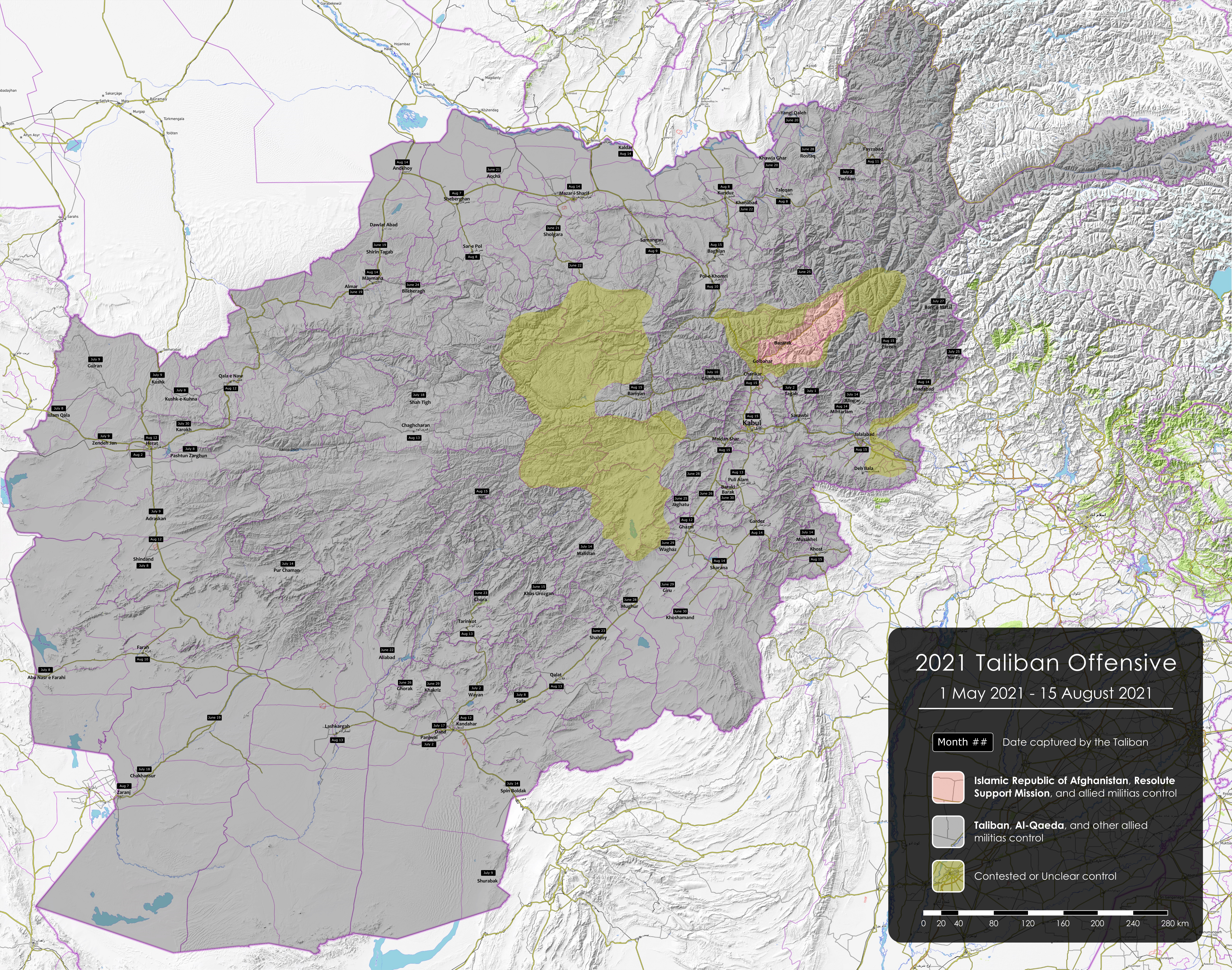
A map of Afghanistan showing the 2021 Taliban offensive

The Taliban began its last major offensive on 1 May, culminating in the fall of Kabul, a Taliban victory, and the end of war. In the first three months of the offensive, the Taliban made significant territorial gains in the countryside, increasing the number of districts it controlled from 73 to 223.

The Taliban gained control of various towns throughout June and July. On 6 August, they captured the first provincial capital of Zaranj. Over the next ten days, they swept across the country, capturing capital after capital. On 14 August, Mazar-i-Sharif was captured as commanders Rashid Dostum and Atta Nur fled across the border to Uzbekistan, cutting Kabul's vital northern supply route.

On 15 August, Jalalabad fell, cutting the only remaining international route through the Khyber Pass. By noon, Taliban forces advanced from the Paghman district reaching the gates of Kabul; Ghani discussed the city's protection with security ministers, while sources claimed a unity peace agreement with the Taliban was imminent. However, Ghani was unable to reach top officials in the interior and defense ministries, and several high-profile politicians had already hurried to the airport. By 2 p.m., the Taliban had entered the city facing no resistance; the president soon fled by helicopter from the Presidential Palace, and within hours, Taliban fighters were pictured at Ghani's desk in the palace. With the virtual collapse of the republic, the Taliban declared the war over on the same day.

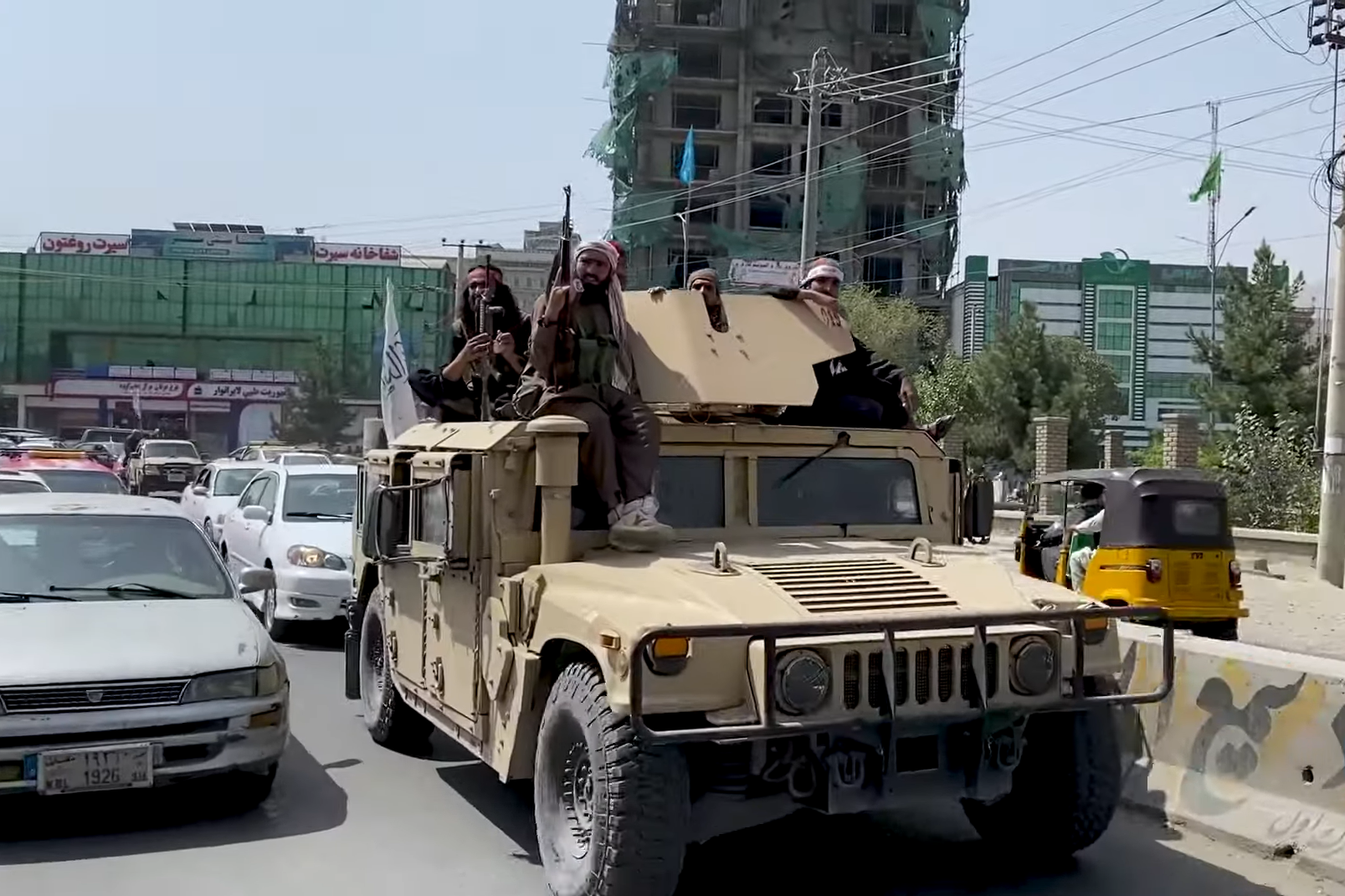
Taliban fighters in Kabul, 17 August 2021

As the Taliban seized control, the need to evacuate populations vulnerable to the Taliban, including the interpreters and assistants who had worked with the coalition forces, ethnic minorities, and women, became urgent. For more than two weeks, international diplomatic, military and civilian staff, as well as Afghan civilians, were airlifted out the country from Hamid Karzai International Airport. On 16 August, Major General Hank Taylor confirmed that US air strikes had ended at least 24 hours earlier and that the US military's focus would be to maintain security at the airport as evacuations continued. The final flight, a US Air Force C-17, departed on 30 August, marking the end of America's longest war.

== Impact ==
=== Casualties ===
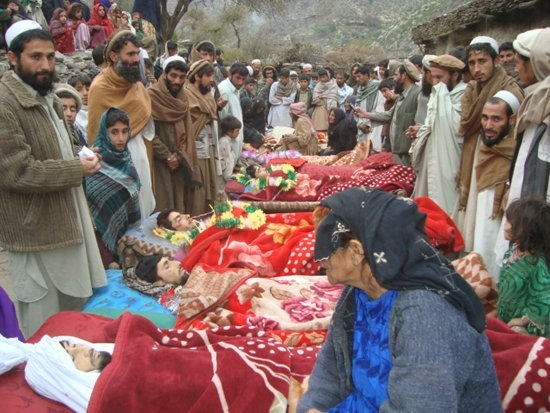
Victims of the Narang night raid that killed at least 10 Afghan civilians, December 2009

According to the Costs of War Project, the war killed 46,319 Afghan civilians in Afghanistan. However, the death toll is possibly higher due to unaccounted deaths by "disease, loss of access to food, water, infrastructure, and/or other indirect consequences of the war." The Physicians for Social Responsibility, Physicians for Global Survival and International Physicians for the Prevention of Nuclear War (IPPNW) concluded that 106,000–170,000 civilians were killed as a result of fighting in Afghanistan by all parties in the conflict. More than 80,000 Taliban fighters were killed.

The majority of civilian casualties were attributed to anti-government elements each year, though the figure varied from 61% to 80%, with the average hovering around 75% due to the Taliban and other anti-government elements. UNAMA started publishing civilian casualty figures in 2008. These figures attributed about 41% of civilian casualties to government-aligned forces in 2008, dropping to about 18% in 2015.

Civilian deaths caused by non-Afghan Coalition forces were low later in the war after most foreign troops were withdrawn and the coalition shifted to airstrikes. For example, in 2015, pro-government forces caused 17% of civilian deaths and injuries – including US and NATO troops, which were responsible for only 2% of the casualties. 2016 had a similar 2% figure. Civilian deaths were higher as well in the latter part of the war, with 2015 and 2016 both consecutively breaking the record of annual civilian deaths.

A prospective study of injuries caused by anti-personnel IEDs was reported in BMJ Open. It showed the injuries to be far worse with IEDs than with landmines, causing multiple limb amputations and lower body mutilation. In an accompanying press release, BMJ considered the anti-personnel IED to cause 'superfluous injury and unnecessary suffering'. Use of weapons that cause superfluous injury and unnecessary suffering is considered a war crime.

=== Refugees ===
Foreign donated clothing being handed out by an Afghan civil officer to children at a refugee camp, 2011

Millions of Afghans have been internally displaced or become refugees as a result of decades of conflict in Afghanistan since 1979. From 2002 to 2012, more than 5.7 million former refugees returned to Afghanistan, increasing the country's population by 25%. 2.6 million Afghans remained refugees in 2021 when the Taliban took over, while another 4 million were internally displaced. Following the Taliban takeover, over 122,000 people were airlifted abroad from Kabul airport, during the evacuation from Afghanistan, including Afghans, American citizens, and other foreign citizens.

=== War crimes ===
War crimes have been committed by both sides including civilian massacres, bombings of civilian targets, terrorism, use of torture and the murder of prisoners of war. Additional common crimes include theft, arson, and destruction of property not warranted by military necessity.

The Taliban committed war crimes including massacres, suicide bombing, anti-personnel IED use, terrorism, and targeting civilians (such as using human shields). As of 2011, the Taliban was responsible for 3/4 of all civilian deaths in the war in Afghanistan. UN reports consistently blamed the Taliban and other anti-government forces for the majority of civilian deaths in the conflict. Other crimes include mass rape and executing surrendered soldiers.

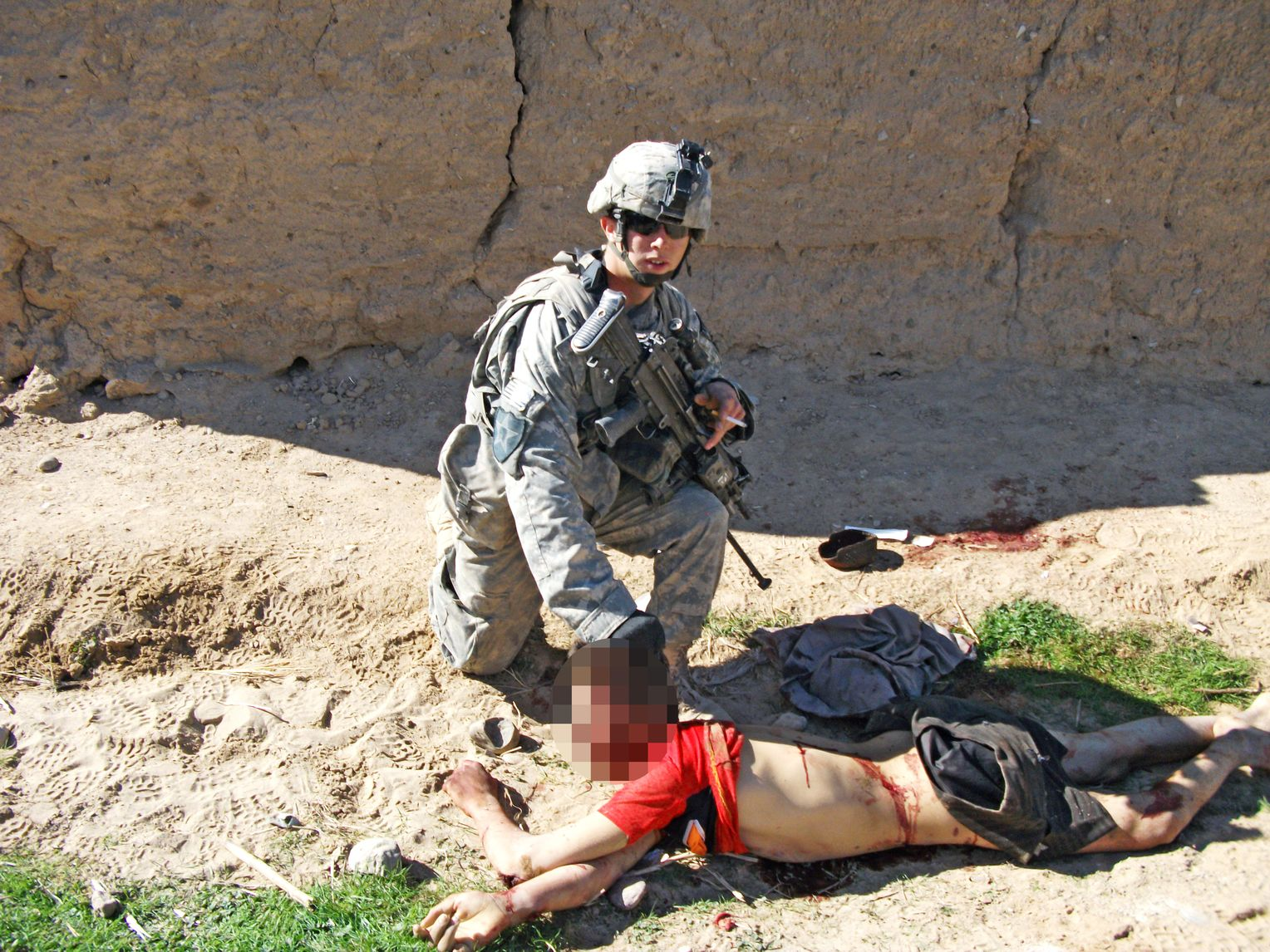
Afghan boy murdered on 15 January 2010 by a group of US Army soldiers called the Kill Team

War crimes committed by the Coalition, Afghan security forces, and Northern Alliance included massacres, prisoner mistreatment, carpet bombing villages, and killings of civilians. Amnesty International accused the Pentagon of covering up evidence related to war crimes, torture and unlawful killings in Afghanistan. Notable incidents include the Dasht-i-Leili massacre, Bagram torture and prisoner abuse, Kandahar massacre, among others.

In 2020, the International Criminal Court investigation in Afghanistan formally commenced, investigating war crimes and crimes against humanity committed by all parties in Afghanistan since 1 May 2013. In 2023, the UK launched a public inquiry to investigate reports of alleged unlawful killings by UKSF personnel during the war in Afghanistan.

=== Drug trade ===
In 2000, Afghanistan accounted for an estimated 75% of the world's opium supply, which was the Taliban's largest source of revenue through taxes on opium exports. However, in July 2000, Mullah Omar banned all opium cultivation, cutting the opium harvest by 94%. Observers said this was an attempt to gain international recognition, raise opium prices and increase profit from the sale of large existing stockpiles.

During and after the 2001 invasion, the US allied with powerful Pashtun warlords who had been involved in drug smuggling in the country’s south-east. According to historian Alfred McCoy, this meant that when the Taliban was overthrown, "the groundwork had already been laid for the resumption of opium cultivation and the drug trade on a major scale." Ahmed Wali Karzai, the younger brother of Hamid Karzai, was allegedly a prominent drug trafficker and on the CIA payroll, though he denied this. In 2008, The New York Times reported that despite credible reports of his involvement in the trade, these were not investigated by the US government. By 2005, Afghanistan was producing 90% of the world's opium.

By 2018, the US had spent $8.6 billion since 2002 to stop Afghanistan's drug trade. A 2021 report estimated that the Taliban earned 60% of their revenue from the trade, while UN officials estimated more than $400 million was earned by the Taliban between 2018 and 2019, however other experts estimated that the Taliban earned at most $40 million annually. In 2010, Peter Dale Scott, citing UN estimates, stated that the Taliban's share of the Afghan opium trade was far smaller than that belonging to supporters of Karzai's government. Between 2004 and 2015, the CIA ran a covert program in an attempt to reduce the opium trade in Afghanistan by dropping specially developed poppy seeds that would produce plants containing almost none of the chemicals used to make heroin.

After the Fall of Kabul, the opium trade initially boomed. The Taliban outlawed opium production again in 2022 during the poppy harvest. The ban also came in the middle of a major economic crisis. A 2023 UN report estimated that poppy cultivation in Afghanistan had dropped by over 95% removing the country from its place as the world's largest opium producer and being replaced by the Chin State and Sagaing Region of Myanmar.

== Factors leading to coalition defeat ==
Observers have argued that the mission in Afghanistan was hampered by a lack of agreement on objectives, a lack of resources, lack of coordination, too much focus on the central government at the expense of local and provincial governments, and too much focus on the country instead of the region.

Failures of the NATO-led coalition efforts to end the Afghanistan insurgency include systematic failures to build institutional and governance structures, as US policy prioritized counterterrorism. Government forces in Afghanistan likewise became too financially dependent on Western powers, unable to build an independent governing system in rural areas.

=== Environment and drug trade ===
Climate change significantly increased instability in Afghanistan and strengthened the Taliban. In 2021, more than 60% of the Afghan population depended on agriculture, and Afghanistan was the sixth most vulnerable country to climate change in the world, according to the UN Environment Program and Afghanistan's National Environmental Protection Agency. The Taliban used resentment over government inaction to climate change-induced drought and flooding to strengthen its support and Afghans were able to earn more money supporting the Taliban than from farming.

Despite efforts to eradicate poppy, Afghanistan remained the world's largest producer of illicit opiate by the end of the war. The Taliban profited at least tens of millions of dollars from opium and heroin annually as of 2018.

=== Early mistakes and the US' other war ===
Journalist Jason Burke notes "strategic mistakes by the US and allies in the immediate aftermath of the 2001 invasion" as being a reason why the war went on for so long. He also noted "missed early opportunities" to "construct a stable political settlement."

Steve Coll believes that "No small part of NATO's ultimate failure to stabilize Afghanistan flowed from the disastrous decision by George W. Bush to invade Iraq in 2003. ... The Taliban's comeback, America's initial inattention to it, and the attraction for some Afghans and Pakistanis of the Taliban's ideology of national resistance under Islamic principles—all these sources of failure cannot be understood in isolation from the Iraq War." Coll further notes that neither the Bush nor the Obama administrations achieved consensus on key questions such as the relative importance of nation-building versus counterterrorism, whether the stability of Afghanistan took priority over that of Pakistan, or the role of the drug trade, although "the failure to solve the riddle of ISI and to stop its covert interference in Afghanistan became ... the greatest strategic failure of the American war."

=== Domestic corruption and politics ===
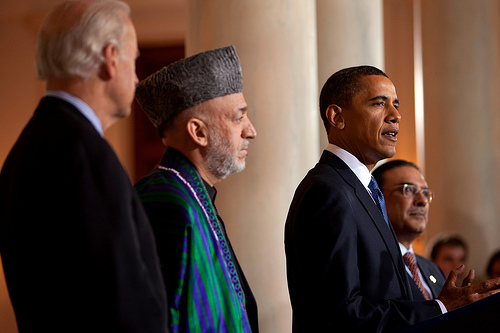
Presidents Hamid Karzai and Barack Obama in 2009

In 2009, Afghanistan was ranked as the world's second most-corrupt country. A lengthy report by SIGAR, and other findings, found that spiraling corruption in Afghanistan during the 2000s was not halted by the US. During this time, many elite figures in the country had effectively become kleptocrats, while ordinary Afghans were struggling.

It has been argued that the restoration of monarchy in Afghanistan should not have been vetoed, as this may have provided stability to the country.

=== Influence of non-NATO actors ===
Pakistan played a central role in the conflict. A 2010 report stated that the ISI had an "official policy" of supporting the Taliban. "Pakistan appears to be playing a double-game of astonishing magnitude", the report states. Regarding the Afghan War documents leak, Der Spiegel wrote that "the documents clearly show that [Pakistan's ISI] is the most important accomplice the Taliban has outside of Afghanistan." Amrullah Saleh, the former director of Afghanistan's intelligence service, stated, "We talk about all these proxies [Taliban, Haqqanis] but not the master of proxies, which is the Pakistan army. ... They want to gain influence in the region." Just as when they funded the Afghan mujahideen in the Soviet–Afghan War, Pakistan's objective was to ensure that Afghanistan is friendly to their interests, and provide "geopolitical depth in any future conflict with India."

In the war, Iran and the Taliban formed ties Russian assistance to "bleed" the American force. Iran and Russia, emboldened by their alliance in the Syrian civil war, initiated a 'proxy war' in Afghanistan against the US. The Taliban received economic support from Dubai, United Arab Emirates and Bahrain. Pakistan gave economic support and encouraged increased Iran-Taliban ties.

China quietly expanded its influence. Since 2010, China had signed mining contracts with Kabul and is building a military base in Badakhshan to counter regional terrorism (from the ETIM). China donated billions of dollars in aid over the years to Afghanistan, which plays a strategic role in the Belt and Road Initiative. Additionally, after 2011, Pakistan expanded its economic and military ties to China as a hedge against dependency on the US. Coll observes that "Overall, the war left China with considerable latitude in Central Asia, without having made any expenditure of blood, treasure, or reputation."

=== Misleading the American public ===
In 2019, The Washington Post published 2,000 pages of government documents, mostly transcripts of interviews with more than 400 key figures involved in prosecuting the war. According to the Post and The Guardian, the documents (dubbed the Afghanistan Papers) showed that US officials consistently and deliberately misled the American public about the unwinnable nature of the conflict, and some commentators and foreign policy experts subsequently drew comparisons to the release of the Pentagon Papers.

== Foreign support for the Taliban ==
=== Pakistan ===
The Taliban's victory was aided by Pakistan. Although Pakistan was a major US ally before and after the 2001 invasion, elements of its military and intelligence services have, for decades, maintained strong ties with Taliban militants, and this support helped the insurgency in Afghanistan. For example, the Haqqani Network had strong support from the ISI. Taliban leaders found a safe haven in Pakistan; they lived there, doing business, earning funds, and receiving medical care. Some elements of the Pakistani establishment sympathized with Taliban ideology, and many Pakistan officials considered the Taliban as an asset against India.

=== Russia and Iran ===
After 9/11, Iranian forces led by Qasem Soleimani initially cooperated, secretly, with American officials against al-Qaeda and the Taliban, but that cooperation ended after Bush's "axis of evil" speech" on January 29, 2002, which labeled Iran a state sponsor of terror and threat to regional peace. Afterwards, Iran became increasingly hostile to American forces in the region.

Terrorism analyst Antonio Giustozzi of the Royal United Services Institute wrote: "Both the Russians and the Iranians helped the Taliban advance at a breakneck pace in May–August 2021. They contributed to funding and equipping them, but perhaps even more importantly they helped them by brokering deals with parties, groups, and personalities close to either country, or even both. [...] The Revolutionary Guards helped the Taliban's advance in western Afghanistan, including by lobbying various strongmen and militia commanders linked to Iran not to resist the Taliban."

== Reactions ==
=== Domestic reactions ===
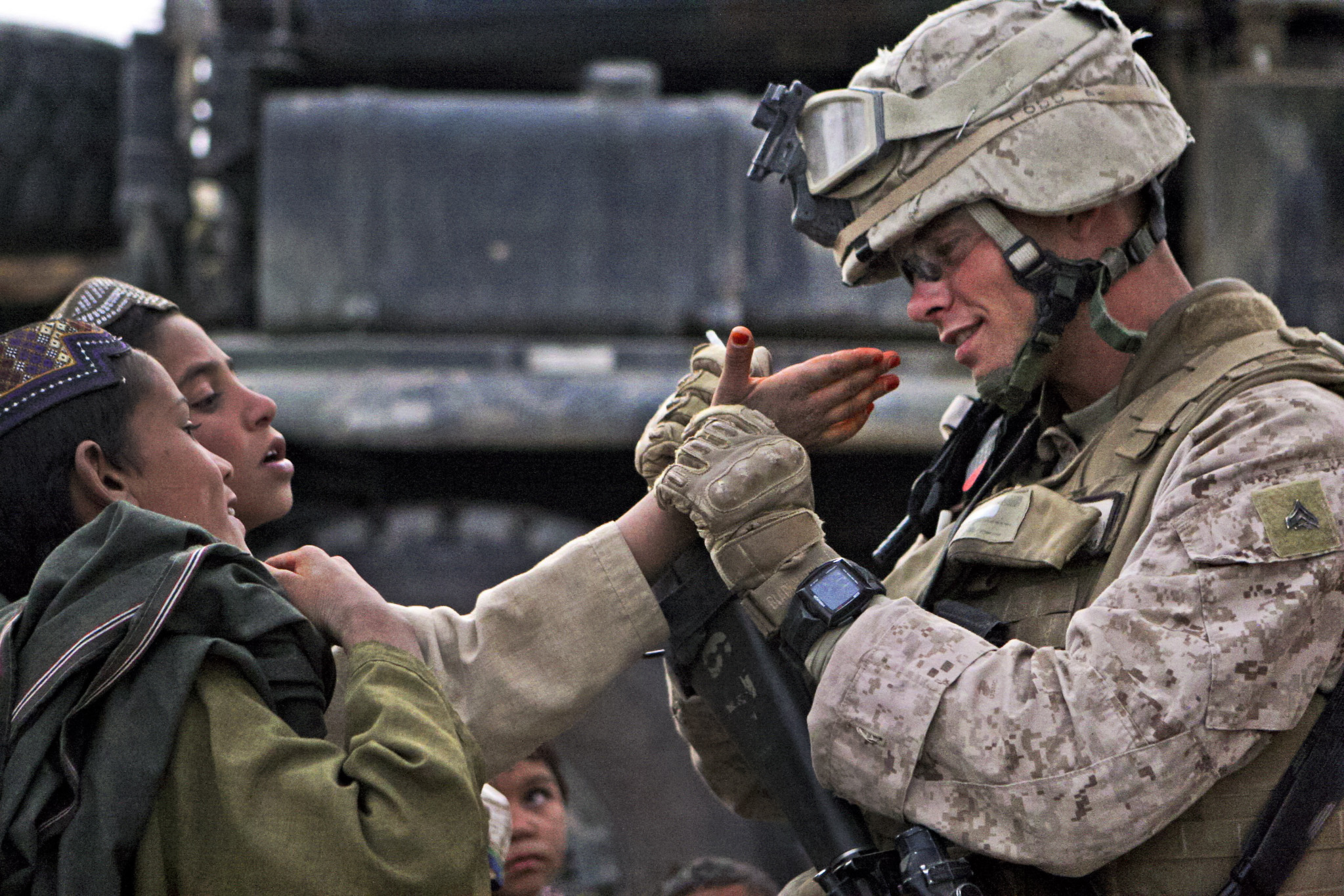
A US marine interacting with Afghan children in Helmand Province

In November 2001, the CNN reported widespread relief amongst Kabul's residents after the Taliban fled the city, with young men shaving off their beards and women taking off their burqas. Later that month, BBC reporter Kate Clark said that "almost all women in Kabul are still choosing to veil" but that many felt hopeful that the ousting of the Taliban would improve their safety and access to food.

A 2006 WPO opinion poll found that the majority of Afghans endorsed America's military presence, with 83% of Afghans stating that they had a favorable view of the US military forces in their country. Only 17% gave an unfavorable view. 82% of Afghans, among all ethnic groups including Pashtuns, stated that the overthrowing of the Taliban was a good thing. However, the majority of Afghans held negative views on Pakistan and most Afghans also stated that they believe that the Pakistani government was allowing the Taliban to operate from its soil.

A 2015 survey by Langer Research Associates found that 80% of Afghans believed it was a good thing for the US to overthrow the Taliban in 2001. More Afghans blamed the Taliban or al-Qaeda for the country's violence (53%) than those who blamed the US (12%). A 2019 survey by The Asia Foundation found that 13.4% of Afghans had sympathy for the Taliban, while 85.1% of respondents had none. 88.6% of urban residents had no sympathy, compared to 83.9% of rural residents.

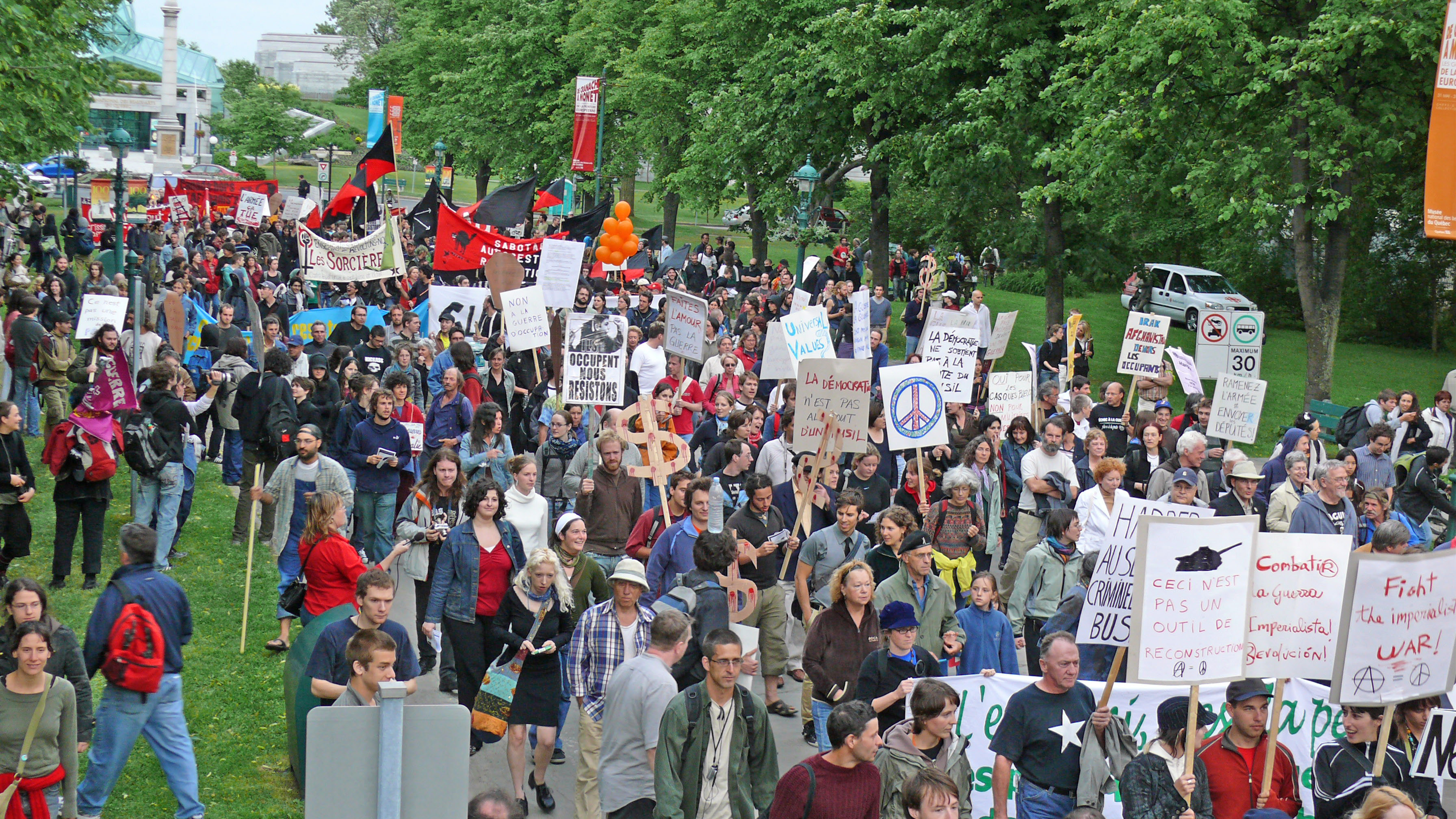
22 June 2007 demonstration in Québec City against the Canadian military involvement in Afghanistan

=== International public opinion ===
In October 2001, polls indicated that about 88% of Americans and about 65% of Britons backed military action. An Ipsos-Reid poll conducted between November and December 2001 showed that majorities in Canada (66%), France (60%), Germany (60%), Italy (58%), and the UK (65%) approved of US airstrikes while majorities in Argentina (77%), China (52%), South Korea (50%), Spain (52%), and Turkey (70%) opposed them.

In 2008, there was a strong opposition to the war in Afghanistan in 21 of 24 countries surveyed. Only in the US and Great Britain did half the people support the war, with a larger percentage (60%) in Australia. Of the seven NATO countries in the survey, none showed a majority in favor of keeping NATO troops in Afghanistan – one, the US, came close to a majority (50%). Of the other six NATO countries, five had majorities of their population wanting NATO troops removed from Afghanistan as soon as possible. A 2011 Pew Research Center poll showed little change in American views, with about 50% saying that the effort was going very well or fairly well and only 44% supporting NATO troop presence in Afghanistan.

=== Protests, demonstrations and rallies ===
The war was the subject of large protests around the world, starting in the days leading up to the invasion, and every year since. Many protesters considered the bombing and invasion of Afghanistan to be unjustified aggression. Dozens of organizations held a national march for peace in Washington, D.C., on 20 March 2010.

== Aftermath ==
=== Formation of the Taliban government and international recognition ===
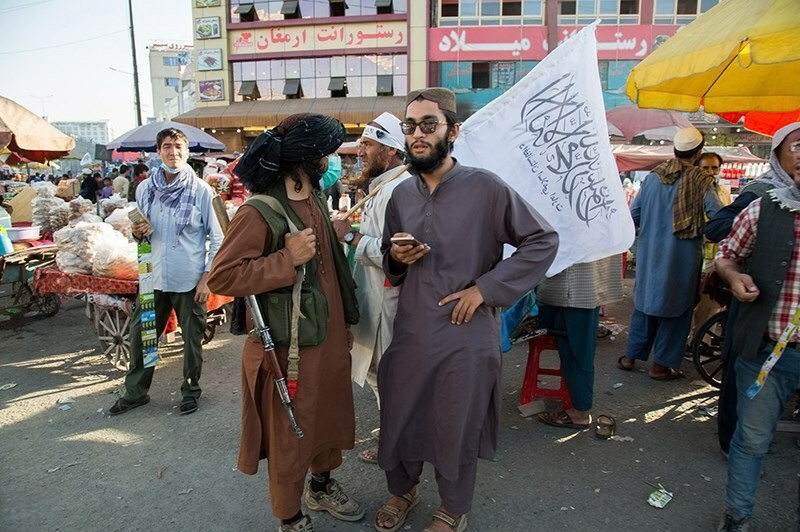
Taliban fighters at a market in Kabul, September 2021. A vendor selling Islamic Emirate flags can be seen.

On 7 September 2021, the Taliban declared an interim government headed by Mohammad Hassan Akhund as Prime Minister.

=== Continuing conflict ===
Despite the fall of the Republican government and the complete Taliban takeover of the country, conflict continued in Afghanistan into 2025 in multiple forms including by republican groups and terrorist groups opposed to the Taliban. This poses significant challenges to their rule and the stability of the country. The presence of terrorist groups against or allied with the Taliban also invites the possibility of foreign military action against those groups or the Taliban government if it is deemed to provide these groups with safe haven.

==== Republican insurgency ====
One remaining Republican holdout operating in Panjshir Valley, which had not been taken by Taliban forces up to that point, was defeated in mid-September 2021, and the resistance leaders reportedly fled to neighboring Tajikistan. However, fighting between Taliban and pro-republican forces continued in other provinces.

Several regions had become the site of a guerrilla campaign by early 2022. As of October 2022, at least 14 armed anti-Taliban resistance groups, including the National Resistance Front, Afghanistan Freedom Front, Supreme Resistance Council, Freedom Uprising, are active in Afghanistan.

==== Terrorist groups and terrorism against the Taliban government ====
The Taliban promised in the 2020 Doha Agreement to cut ties with al-Qaeda and to discontinue providing a safe haven for terrorist groups. While it has taken significant action to suppress hostile groups and make other groups fall in line, multiple armed groups (including al-Qaeda) continue to operate in Afghanistan. The relationship between these groups and the Taliban is not uniform, with some opposing Taliban rule through military action.

==== Islamic State activity ====
By 2014, ISIS-K became the largest and strongest terror group active in Afghanistan, with the Taliban viewing them as the primary threat to their rule.

Following the 2021 Kabul airport attack conducted by the group, the US said it could work with the Taliban to fight against IS as part of the International military intervention against IS.

==== Other active armed groups ====
Various other armed groups besides ISIS-K and Republican groups operate in Afghanistan. Since the Taliban takeover, some Taliban-allied groups are serving specific roles for the Islamic Emirate of Afghanistan.

Some of them include:

- Haqqani Network: A highly organized and connected group that has over time become a Taliban element. The group has been tasked with matters of internal security in Kabul or beyond after the city was seized.
- Al-Qaeda in the Indian subcontinent (AQIS): The regional al-Qaeda branch, which is allied to the Taliban.
- Tehreek-e-Taliban Pakistan (TTP): A group-collective with low cohesion operating along the Afghan-Pakistan border in resistance to the current Pakistani state. Its leader formally pledged allegiance to Taliban (who publicly rejected it), groups under TTP have variously pledged allegiance to the Islamic State instead. The group had fractured and recombined many times creating both short- and long-lived splinters that make statements on allegiance difficult.
  - Jundullah: A former TTP affiliate that now pledges allegiance to the IS.
  - Tehreek-e-Jihad Pakistan (TJP): Claims to be an independent group but is accused of being a TTP front for either avoiding public condemnation or to enable to continue attacks in Pakistan while shielding the Taliban from Pakistani accusations of sheltering TTP militants.
- Turkistan Islamic Party (TIP): A group looking to establish an Islamic state in East-Central Asia and Xinjiang. They have a cordial relationship with the Taliban, but the Taliban seem to have made efforts to remove them from the Chinese border region to not upset China.
- Islamic Movement of Uzbekistan (IMU): Some time after the original IMU was absorbed into ISIS-K in mid-2015 a faction using the group's name appeared. The new group has signaled loyalty to al-Qaeda and the Taliban while opposing the Islamic State.
- Jamaat Ansarullah (JA): An Islamic-nationalist group opposed to the government of Tajikistan. They are tasked with border security on the Afghan-Tajik border.

==== Taliban action to counter domestic threats ====
The Taliban have made major efforts to suppress hostile groups and to make rogue elements fall in line. The Taliban's first method of combating rogue elements was to publicly downplay any threats while crushing them with brute force, including collective punishment, ethnic and religious profiling, arbitrary detention, torture, and extrajudicial killings. The Taliban have since recognized how such methods can be counterproductive to the stability and legitimacy of their government, and have since experimented with approaches such as disarmament and reconciliation. The more soft-handed methods includes the transfer of personnel to prevent feuds, releasing prisoners in cooperation with tribal leaders, and enlisting religious scholars to dissuade people from violent resistance.

They have also again offered amnesty to their former opponents to cooperate and not fight them in order to rebuild the state and its institutions and security apparatus.

The Taliban killed or forcibly disappeared more than 100 former members of the Afghan security forces in the three months after the takeover in the provinces of Ghazni, Helmand, Kandahar, and Kunduz. The Taliban identified targets for arrest and execution through intelligence operations and access to employment records that were left behind. Former members of the security forces were also killed by the Taliban within days of registering with them to receive a letter guaranteeing their safety.

=== Abandonment of Afghan allies ===
As many as 150,000 Afghans who assisted the US remained in Afghanistan, including individuals who worked closely with US forces. Hundreds of former Afghan special forces who fought alongside British troops in Afghanistan have been barred from resettling in the UK. One former UK Special Forces officer stated that "At a time when certain actions by UK Special Forces are under investigation by a public inquiry, their headquarters also had the power to prevent former Afghan Special Forces colleagues and potential witnesses to these actions from getting safely to the UK."

=== Humanitarian crisis ===
Following the Taliban takeover, western nations suspended humanitarian aid, and the World Bank and International Monetary Fund also halted payments to Afghanistan. The Biden administration froze about $9 billion in assets belonging to the Afghan central banks, blocking the Taliban from accessing billions of dollars held in US bank accounts. By October 2021, more than half of Afghanistan's 39 million people faced an acute food shortage. By November, Afghanistan was facing widespread famine due to collapsed economy and broken banking system. World leaders pledged $1.2 billion in humanitarian aid to Afghanistan. In December, the UN Security Council unanimously adopted a US-proposed resolution to help aid reach desperate Afghans, while seeking to keep funds out of Taliban hands.

In August 2022, UN humanitarian chief Martin Griffiths warned about Afghanistan's deepening poverty, with 6 million people at risk of famine. He stated that conflict, poverty, climate shocks, and food insecurity "have long been a sad reality" in Afghanistan, but almost a year after the Taliban takeover, halt to large-scale development aid have made the situation critical.

In 2025, the second Trump administration froze foreign aid and cut funding to the US Agency for International Development (USAID), adversely affecting the humanitarian crisis. 40% of the country's humanitarian health facilities closed or suspended operations as a result. The Trump administration stated that no one had died as a result of aid cuts. CNN disputed this, with one pediatrician in Afghanistan telling them that the infant mortality rate had increased by 3% to 4%.

== See also ==
- United States documents leak of the War in Afghanistan
- Criticism of the war on terror
- Environmental impacts of war in Afghanistan
- List of Afghanistan War (2001–2021) documentaries
- List of aviation accidents and incidents in the war in Afghanistan
- List of conflicts in Asia
- List of military operations in the war in Afghanistan (2001–2021)
- NATO logistics during the War in Afghanistan (2001–2021)
- The American War in Afghanistan: A History nonfiction book by Carter Malkasian 2021.
- US government response to the September 11 attacks
