= Zahedan Mixed Passenger =

Former mixed train service in Pakistan

Overview
- Service type: Inter-city rail
- First service: 1979
- Current operator: Pakistan Railways

Route
- Termini: Quetta; Zahedan
- Stops: 38
- Distance travelled: 732 kilometres (455 mi)
- Average journey time: 33 hours, 10 minutes
- Service frequency: 2 per month per direction
- Train numbers: 403UP (Quetta→Zahedan); 404DN (Zahedan→Quetta)

On-board services
- Class: Economy
- Sleeping arrangements: Available
- Catering facilities: Not available

Technical
- Track gauge: 1,676 mm (5 ft 6 in)
- Track owner: Pakistan Railways

Zahedan Mixed Passenger (Urdu: زاهدان آمیزش مسافر, Persian: زاهدان مسافری مخلوط) was an international mixed freight and passenger train operated twice a month by Pakistan Railways between Quetta, Pakistan and Zahedan, Iran.

== Journey ==
The trip took approximately 33 hours, 10 minutes to cover a published distance of 732 kilometres (455 mi), traveling along the entire stretch of the Quetta–Taftan Railway Line. The train was named after the Iranian city of Zahedan and ran on the 1st and 15th of every month from Quetta to Zahedan, and the 3rd and 17th of each month from Zahedan to Quetta.

This train no longer runs any more, but in 2018 there were talks to resume the service.

== Station stops ==
- Quetta
- Sar-I-Ab
- Spezand Junction
- Wali Khan
- Sheikh Wasil
- Galangur
- Kishingi
- Nushki
- Ahmedwal
- Padag Road
- Dalbandin
- Yakmach
- Gat
- Azad
- Nok Kundi
- Alam Reg
- Tozghi
- Koh-e-Taftan
- Boundary Pillar
- Mirjaveh
- Khan Muhammad Chah
- Zahedan

== Equipment ==
The train had economy accommodations only.

== See also ==
- Gul Train
- Quetta Railway Station
