= Quetta–Taftan Line =

Main railway line in Pakistan

Overview
- Other name(s): Main Line 4 ML-4; Trans–Baluchistan Railway
- Native name: کوئٹہ-تفتان ریلوے لائن
- Status: operational
- Owner: Pakistan Railways
- Termini: Quetta; Zahedan
- Stations: 41

Service
- Operator: Pakistan Railways

History
- Opened: 15 November 1905

Technical
- Line length: 757 km (470 mi)
- Track gauge: 1,676 mm (5 ft 6 in)
- Operating speed: 20 km/h (12 mph) (Current)

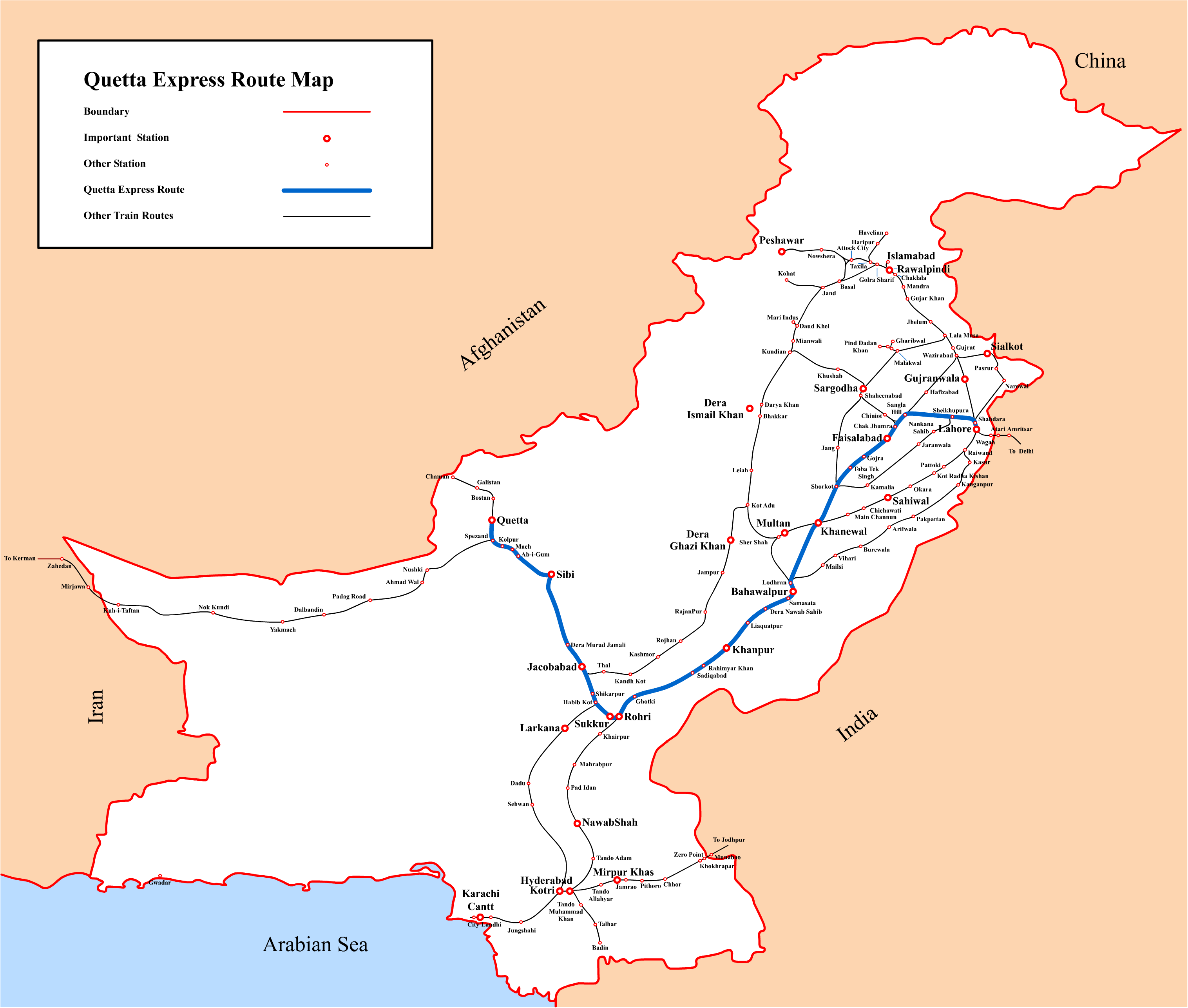
West of the Quetta Express Line (also called the Rohri–Chaman Railway) is the partly overlapping named Quetta-Taftan Line, the final northern Quetta section is the dual-named section

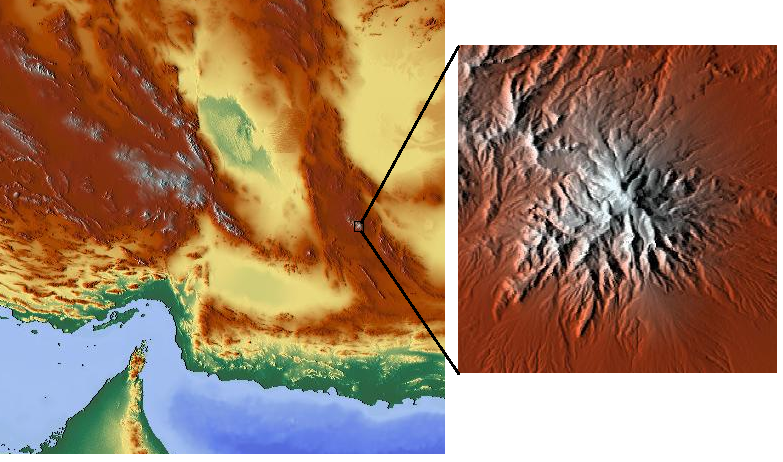
The line climbs through a thin section of the high (red-orange) belt of mountains, coming at closest 62 km (39 mi) northeast of the thermally active volcano, pinpointed, Taftan as to its station at the trunk road town also called Taftan.

The Quetta–Taftan Line, also known as Spezand–Zaheden Railway Line (also referred to as Main Line 4 or ML-4) is one of four main railway lines in Pakistan, operated and maintained by Pakistan Railways. Inward from Pakistan's most western edge, it begins at Spezand Junction and has services that continue beyond Koh-e-Taftan station in high mountains, west. Its length is 732 km (455 mi) to the Iranian border, a few kilometres further west of that station. It has ten active stations, of which seven are in Pakistan and three are in Iran. Many or all primary services since 1940 (and 1922 to 1931) terminate on the natural continuation in eastern Iran at the high city of Zahedan, which sees a change of gauge (of track and rolling stock) for accessing the Trans-Iranian Railway. This section is difficult to maintain due to Nushki Desert and Mountain Ranges.

== History ==
Originally known as the "Trans–Baluchistan Railway", the line was built as part of a strategic military route between British India (specifically the part now Pakistan) and Persia (now Iran). The Quetta to Nushki branch was approved by Lord George Hamilton, Secretary of State for India, in August 1902, and it was opened on 15 November 1905. The part west of Nushki towards Iran was named the Nushki Extension Railway. Work started on it in September 1916 under the charge of P.C. Young as Engineer-in-Chief, and it reached the Iranian town of Duzdap (now Zahedan, a small city) on 1 October 1922. By the time the railway reached Duzdap, the British had already demobilized their forces in East Persia in March 1921, which took away the importance of the newly built part. So much so that in 1931, the 221 km (137 mi) section between Nok Kundi and Duzdap (Zahedan) was closed, and the track was removed for use elsewhere. World War II, however, renewed interest in the Quetta-Zahedan link. British forces wanted to aid the Soviet forces by supplying material through Persia. Aid through Persia proved unnecessary (due to successful Arctic convoys of World War II and similar supplies,) but the Quetta-Zahedan link was reopened on 20 April 1940 in Zahedan.

== Stations ==
The stations are:

- Quetta
- Sar-I-Ab
- Spezand Junction
- Doctor Chah
- Mastung Road
- Wali Khan
- Kanak
- Sheikh Wasil
- Barag Khurd
- Kirdagap
- Galangur
- Kishingi
- Ablak
- Nushki
- Zangiabad
- Ahmedwal
- Sarmall
- Bilao
- Pain Mall
- Padag Road
- Yadgar (Abandoned)
- Nok Chah
- Pishok
- Dalbandin
- Taloo
- Ismaili
- Yakmach
- Noli
- Gat
- Azad
- Isa Tahir
- Nok Kundi
- Alam Reg
- Tozghi
- Warechah
- Reg-I-Malik
- Koh-e-Taftan

Boundary Pillar, border between Pakistan and Iran

- Mirjawa
- Bug
- Khan Muhammad Chah
- Kacha Road
- Zahedan

== See also ==
- Karachi–Peshawar Railway Line
- Rohri-Chaman railway line
- Railway lines in Pakistan
