= Cross-border railway lines in Pakistan =

The following is a list of railway border crossings of Pakistan. Pakistan Railways operates passenger and freight services with its neighboring countries. Some of the railway lines and services are operational, while others are non-operational or in proposal or planning stages.

== Pakistan–China ==
Currently, there are no operational railway crossings between Pakistan and China. However, Pakistan Railways is planning to construct a new railway line connecting the two countries.

Proposed Route	Details
Khunjerab Railway	A 982-kilometre railway line has been proposed between Pakistan and China, extending from Havelian railway station to Kashgar–Hotan railway.

== Pakistan–Afghanistan ==
Currently, there are no operational railway crossings between Pakistan and Afghanistan. However, Pakistan Railways is planning to construct a new railway line connecting the two countries.

Proposed Route	Details
Peshawar–Kabul line	Planned
Chaman–Kandhar	Planned

== Pakistan–India ==
Crossing Point (Pakistan)	Crossing Point (India)	Current train services	Line	Province (Pakistan)	Province (India)	Status
Wagah railway station	Atari Shyam Singh railway station	Samjhauta Express	Lahore–Wagah Branch Line	Punjab, Pakistan	Punjab, India	Inactive
Zero Point railway station	Munabao railway station	Thar Express	Hyderabad–Khokhrapar Branch Line	Sindh	Rajasthan	Inactive

== Pakistan–Iran ==
Crossing Point (Pakistan)	Crossing Point (Iran)	Current train services	Line	Province (Pakistan)	Province (Iran)	Status
Boundary Pillar railway station	Mirjaveh railway station	Zahedan Mixed Passenger	Quetta–Taftan Line	Balochistan	Sistan Balochistan	Active

Proposed Route	Details
Gwadar–Chabahar	Planned

== See also ==
- Land border crossings of Pakistan
