= Land border crossings of Pakistan =

Border crossings of Pakistan

This is a list of the land border crossings of Pakistan with its four neighbours, namely Afghanistan, China, India and Iran.

== Afghanistan ==
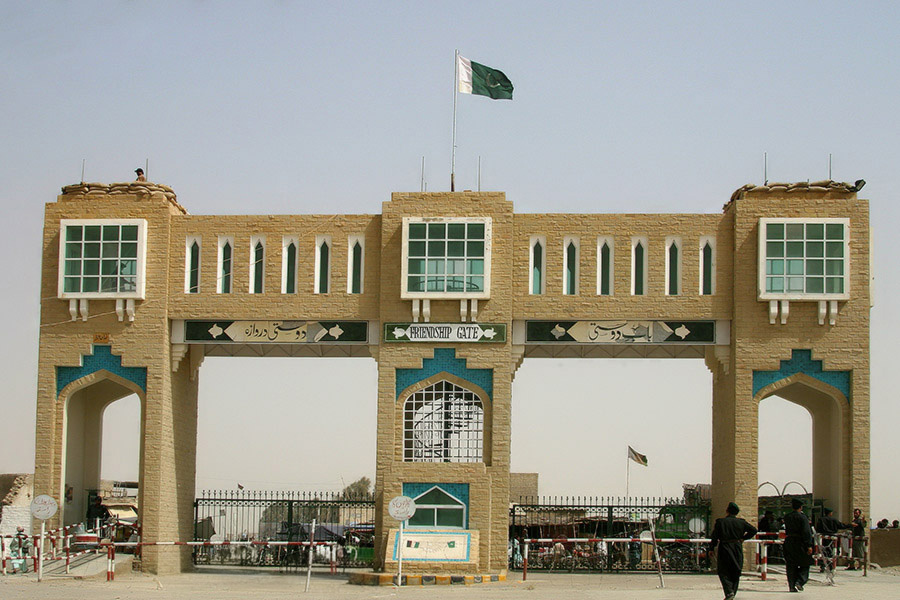
Chaman border crossing

=== Road ===
There are eight official border crossings and trade terminals between Afghanistan and Pakistan, although there are also numerous unofficial and illegal border crossings used by locals, smugglers and terrorists. However, the Pakistani government is trying to stop cross-border infiltration by constructing the Afghanistan–Pakistan barrier.

Pakistan suspended it's border crossings with Afghanistan after the October 2025 conflict. The crossings were once more suspended after the 2026 Afghan-Pak war.

Border crossings with Afghanistan
#	Crossing Point (Pakistan)	Crossing Point (Afghanistan)	Road	Province (Pakistan)	Province (Afghanistan)	Opened	Purpose	Status
1	Angur Ada		Angoor Ada-Urgun Road	Khyber Pakhtunkhwa	Paktika	23.09.2020	Trade	Suspended
2	Badini			Balochistan	Zabul	22.09.2020	Trade	Suspended
3	Chaman		N-25-A75	Balochistan	Kandahar	14.8.1947	Miscellaneous	Restricted
4	Ghulam Khan		Ghulam Khan-Khost Road	Khyber Pakhtunkhwa	Khost	23.08.2020	Miscellaneous	Suspended
5	Kharlachi		Shingak Road-Paktia Road	Khyber Pakhtunkhwa	Paktia	12.07.2020	Trade	Suspended
6	Torkham		N-5-Torkham-Jalalabad Road	Khyber Pakhtunkhwa	Nangarhar	14.8.1947	Miscellaneous	Restricted
7	Arandu		Drosh-Jalalabad Road	Khyber Pakhtunkhwa	Kunar	27.5.2022	Trade	Suspended
8	Bin Shahi			Khyber Pakhtunkhwa	Kunar	27.5.2022	Trade	Suspended

=== Rail (Proposed) ===
- Currently there is no operational railway crossings between Pakistan and Afghanistan, However, Pakistan Railways was planning to lay new railway track between two countries to boost business activities.

== China ==
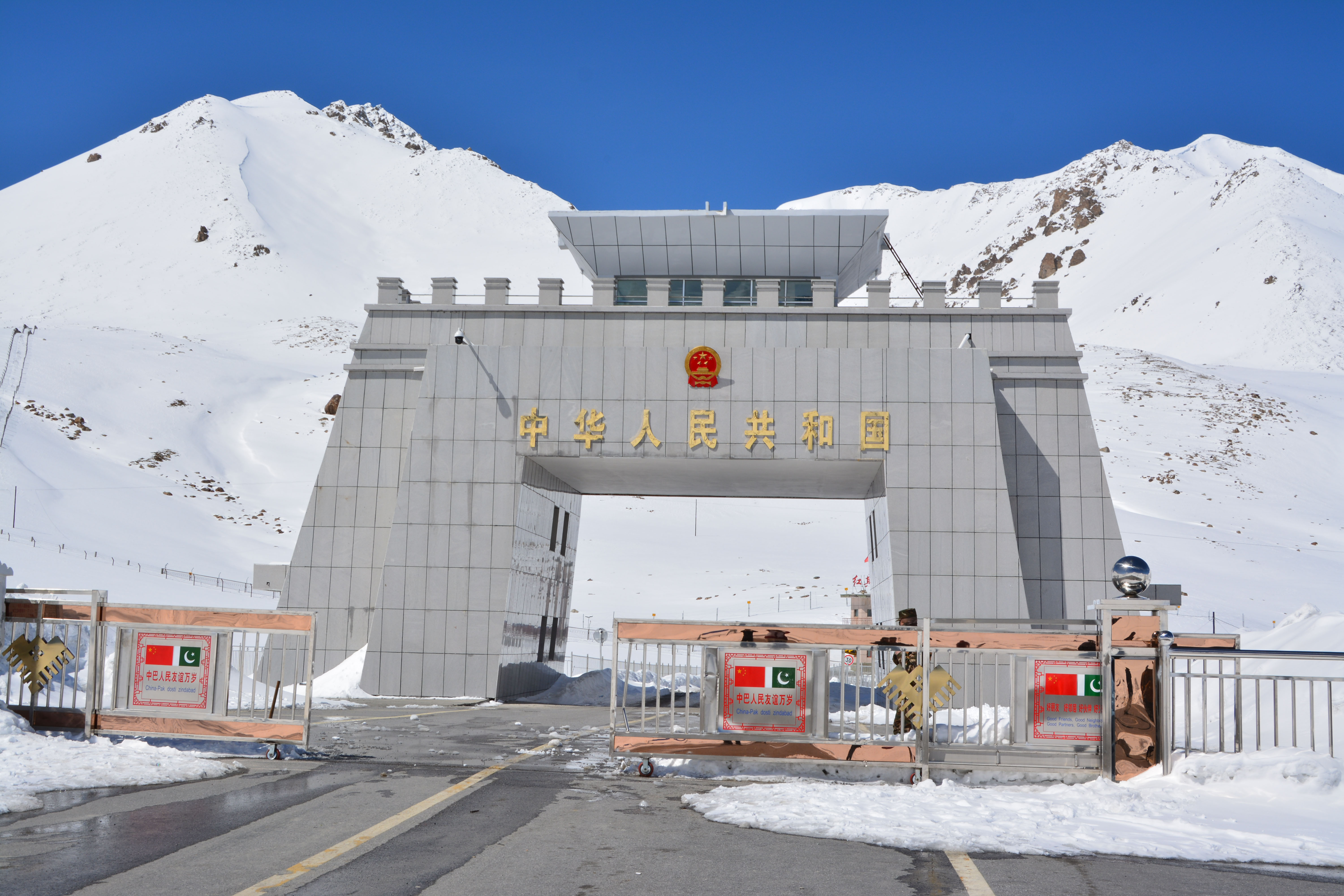
The Khunjerab Pass border crossing between China and Pakistan

=== Road ===
The Khunjerab Pass is the only modern-day border crossing between China and Pakistan which can be accessed via the Karakoram Highway. The actual immigration of the respective countries is cleared in Sost, Pakistan and Tashkurgan, China, around 100 kilometres (62 mi) from the Khunjerab Pass. Historically, the Mintaka Pass and Kilik Pass have also been used; however, those crossings do not have vehicle access and are closed.

Border crossings with China
#	Crossing Point (Pakistan)	Crossing Point (China)	Road	Province (Pakistan)	Province (China)	Opened	Purpose	Status
1	Khunjerab Pass		Karakoram Highway	Gilgit-Baltistan	Xinjiang		Miscellaneous	Operational

=== Road (Proposed) ===
- A border crossing near Mustagh Pass has been proposed as an alternative CPEC route in order to shorten the route to China, which would also connect AJ&K.

=== Rail (Proposed) ===
- A 982-kilometre Khunjerab Railway line has been proposed between Pakistan and China, which will extend from Havelian railway station to Kashgar–Hotan railway.

== India ==
=== Road ===
Currently, there is only one fully-fledged international border crossing open between India and Pakistan: the Wagah-Attari border. It is famous for its Wagah border ceremony which take place every evening. Moreover, the Kartarpur Corridor serves Indian pilgrims, who are able to visit Gurdwara Darbar Sahib Kartarpur visa-free.

Border crossings with India
#	Crossing Point (Pakistan)	Crossing Point (India)	Road	Province (Pakistan)	Province (India)	Opened	Purpose	Status
1	Wagah	Attari	G.T Road - NH 3	Punjab, Pakistan	Punjab, India		Miscellaneous	Closed since 2019
2	Kartarpur Corridor	Dera Baba Nanak	Guru Nanak Highway - NH 354-B	Punjab, Pakistan	Punjab, India	09.11.2019	Religious tourism for Indian citizens to visit Gurdwara Darbar Sahib	Closed since 2019
5	Ganda Singh Wala (Kasur)	Hussainiwala	Firozpur Road - NH 5	Punjab, Pakistan	Punjab, India		Miscellaneous	Closed since 2019

=== Rail ===
Border crossings with India
#	Crossing Point (Pakistan)	Crossing Point (India)	Current Train Services	Line	Province (Pakistan)	Province (India)	Opened	Purpose	Status
1	Wagah	Attari	Samjhauta Express	Lahore and Amritsar/Delhi	Punjab, Pakistan	Punjab, India		Miscellaneous	Closed since 2019
2	Khokhrapar	Munabao	Thar Express	Karachi andJodhpur	Sindh	Rajasthan		Miscellaneous	Closed since 2019

== Iran ==
=== Road ===
Border crossings with Iran
#	Crossing Point (Pakistan)	Crossing Point (Iran)	Road	Province (Pakistan)	Province (Iran)	Opened	Purpose	Status
1	Taftan	Mirjaveh	N-40 - Road 84	Balochistan	Sistan Balochistan		Miscellaneous	Operational
2	Gabd (Gwadar)	Chabahar (Rimdan)	N-10 - Bahukalat Protected Area Road	Balochistan	Sistan Balochistan	20.12.2020	Miscellaneous	Operational
3	Mand	Pishin	Turbat - Road 92	Balochistan	Sistan Balochistan	21.04.2021	Trade	Operational
4	Chadgi	Kuhak	Pishin-Kurumb road	Balochistan	Sistan Balochistan		Trade	Operational

=== Rail ===
Border crossings with Iran
#	Crossing Point (Pakistan)	Crossing Point (Iran)	Current Train Services	Line	Province (Pakistan)	Province (Iran)	Opened	Purpose	Status
1	Taftan	Mirjaveh	Istanbul–Tehran–Islamabad railway	Quetta and Zahedan	Balochistan	Sistan Balochistan		Trade	Operational

== See also ==
- Cross-border railway lines in Pakistan
