= TLQ =

TLQ or tlq may refer to:

- TLQ, the IATA code for Turpan Jiaohe Airport, Xinjiang, China
- TLQ, the station code for Taloo railway station, Pakistan
- tlq, the ISO 639-3 code for Tai Loi language, Burma and Laos
