= Bilao railway station =

Railway station in Balochistan, Pakistan

Bilao Railway Station بیلاو ریلوے اسٹیشن

General information
- Coordinates: 29.1491°N 65.3819°E
- Owner: Ministry of Railways
- Line: Quetta-Taftan Railway Line

Other information
- Station code: BFO

Services
Preceding station	Pakistan Railways	Following station
Ahmedwal towards Quetta	Quetta–Taftan Line	Padag Road towards Zahedan
Location

Bilao Railway Station (Urdu: بیلاو ریلوے اسٹیشن) is located in Balochistan, Pakistan.

== See also ==
- List of railway stations in Pakistan
- Pakistan Railways
