= Padag Road railway station =

Railway station in Pakistan

Padag Road Railway Station پڈاگ روڈ ریلوے اسٹیشن
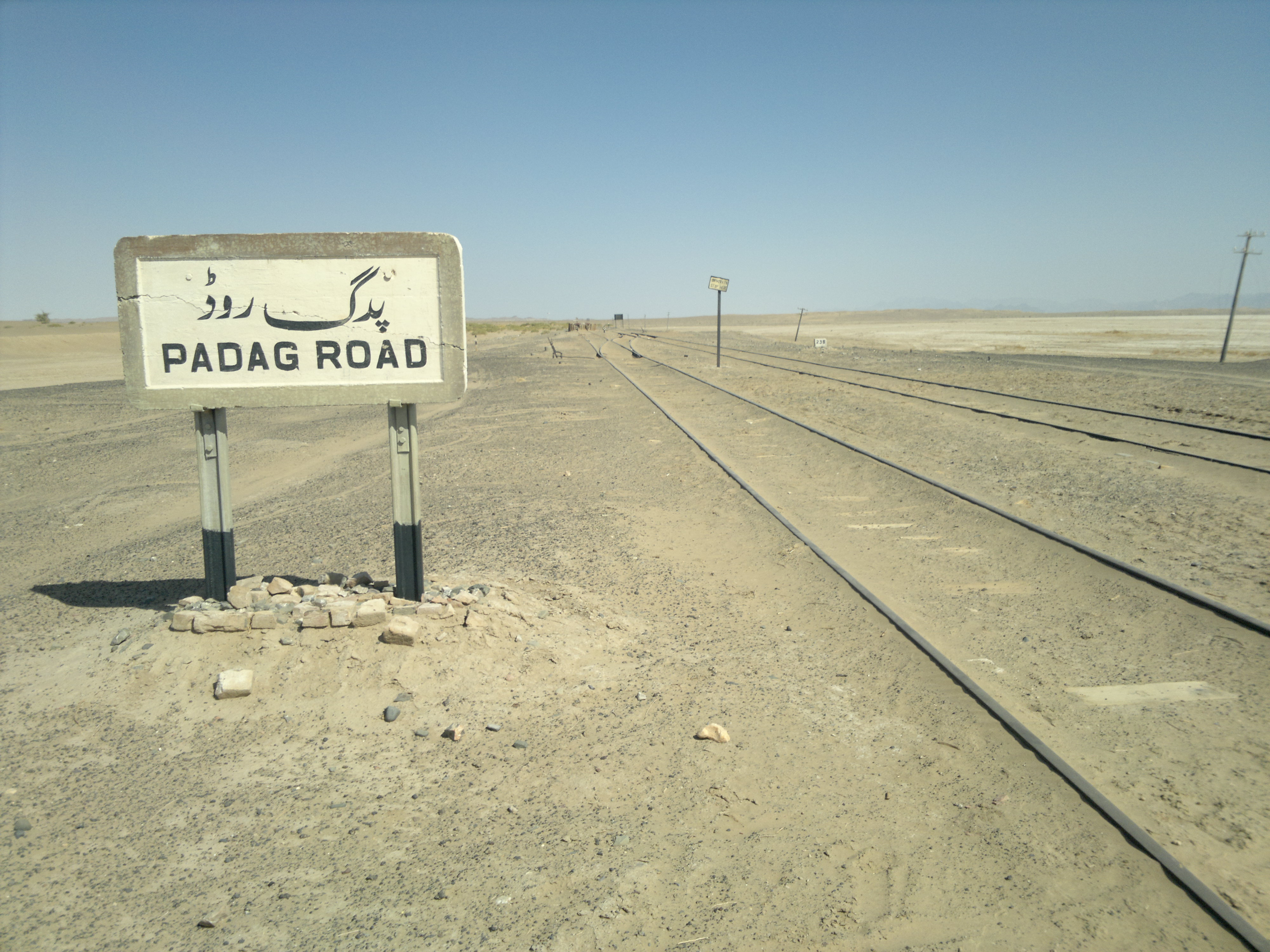

General information
- Coordinates: 29.1030°N 65.1828°E
- Owner: Ministry of Railways
- Line: Quetta-Taftan Railway Line

Other information
- Station code: PGD

Services
Preceding station	Pakistan Railways	Following station
Bilao towards Quetta	Quetta–Taftan Line	Dalbandin towards Zahedan
Location

Padag Road Railway Station (Urdu: پڈاگ سڑک اسٹیشن, Balochi: پڈاگ سڑک اسٹیشن) is located in Pakistan.

== See also ==
- List of railway stations in Pakistan
- Pakistan Railways
