= Mastung Road railway station =

Railway station in Pakistan

Mastung Walikhan Station مستونگ ریلوے اسٹیشن

General information
- Coordinates: 29.8788°N 66.8415°E
- Owner: Ministry of Railways
- Line: Quetta-Taftan Railway Line

Other information
- Station code: MUF

Services
Preceding station	Pakistan Railways	Following station
Spezand Junction towards Quetta	Quetta–Taftan Line	Wali Khan towards Zahedan
Location

Mastung Road Railway Station or Mastung railway station (Urdu: مستونگ اسٹیشن) is located in Mastung, Balochistan, Pakistan.

== See also ==
- List of railway stations in Pakistan
- Pakistan Railways
