= WCH =

WCH may refer to:

== Hospitals ==
- West China Hospital, in Chengdu, Sichuan, China
- Women's and Children's Hospital (Australia), in Adelaide, South Australia, Australia
- Women's College Hospital, in Toronto, Ontario, Canada

== Transportation ==
=== Airlines ===
- Nuevo Chaitén Airport (IATA airport code WCH), Chaitén, Chile

=== Rail ===
- Warechah railway station (station code WCH), Pakistan
- Whitchurch railway station (Hampshire), (National Rail station code WCH), Whitchurch, Hampshire
- Wong Chuk Hang station (MTR station code WCH), Hong Kong
- Wuchang railway station (Pinyin station code WCH), Wuhan, China

== Other uses ==
- Woman's Club of Hollywood, organization in Los Angeles
- World Cup of Hockey, an international ice hockey tournament
