= Ablak railway station =

Railway station in Pakistan

Ablak Railway Station ابلک ریلوے اسٹیشن

General information
- Coordinates: 29°34′59.20″N 66°4′17.62″E
- Owner: Ministry of Railways
- Line: Quetta–Taftan Railway Line

Other information
- Station code: ABL

Services
Preceding station	Pakistan Railways	Following station
Kishingi towards Quetta	Quetta–Taftan Line	Nushki towards Zahedan
Location

Ablak Railway Station (Urdu: ابلک ریلوے اسٹیشن) is located in Pakistan.

== See also ==
- List of railway stations in Pakistan
- Pakistan Railways
