= Yakmach railway station =

Railway station in Chagai District, Pakistan

Yakmach Railway Station یک مچ ریلوے اسٹیشن
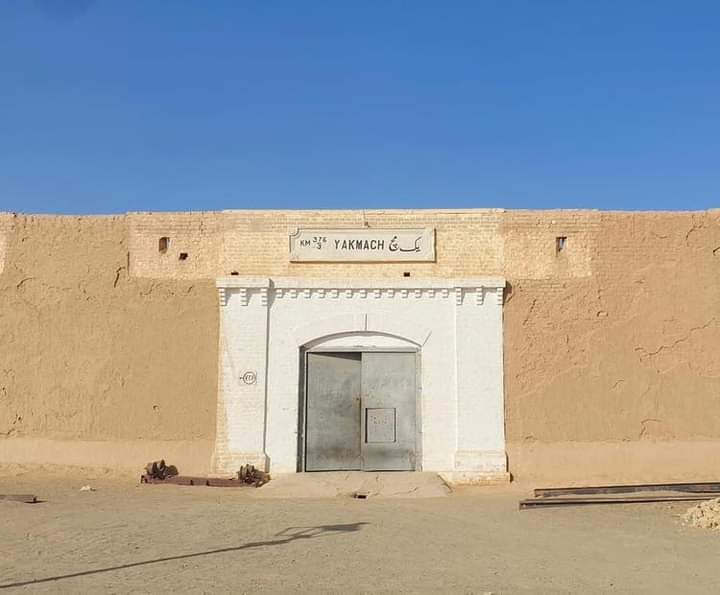

General information
- Coordinates: 28.7442°N 63.8482°E
- Owner: Ministry of Railways
- Line: Quetta-Taftan Line

Other information
- Station code: YMC

Services
Preceding station	Pakistan Railways	Following station
Dalbandin towards Quetta	Quetta–Taftan Line	Gat towards Zahedan
Location

Yakmach Railway Station (Urdu: یک مچ ریلوے اسٹیشن, Balochi: یاکمچ ریلوے اسٹیشن) is located in Yakmach, Balochistan, Pakistan.

== See also ==
- List of railway stations in Pakistan
- Pakistan Railways
