= Mixed train =

Train that hauls passengers and freight

A mixed train or mixed consist is a train that contains both passenger and freight cars or wagons. In some countries, the term refers to a freight train carrying various different types of freight rather a single commodity. Although common in the early days of railways, by the 20th century they were largely confined to branch lines with little traffic. Typically, service was slower, because mixed trains usually involved the shunting (switching) of rolling stock at stops along the way. However, some earlier passenger expresses, which also hauled time-sensitive freight in covered goods wagons (boxcars), would now be termed mixed trains. Generally, toward the end of the mixed train era, shunting at intermediate stops had significantly diminished. Most railway passenger and freight services are now run separately.

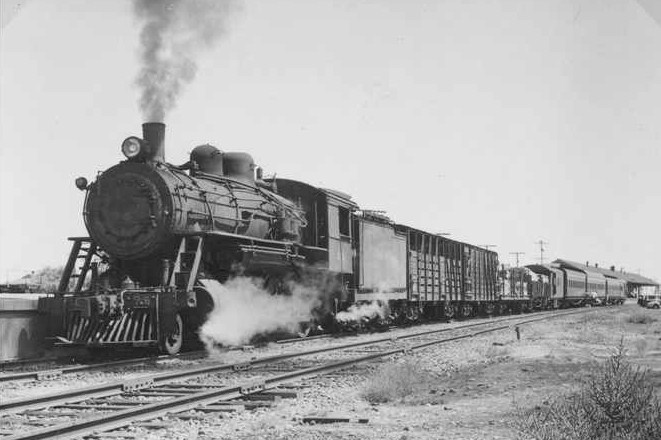
Mixed train at Port Pirie, South Australia, 1951

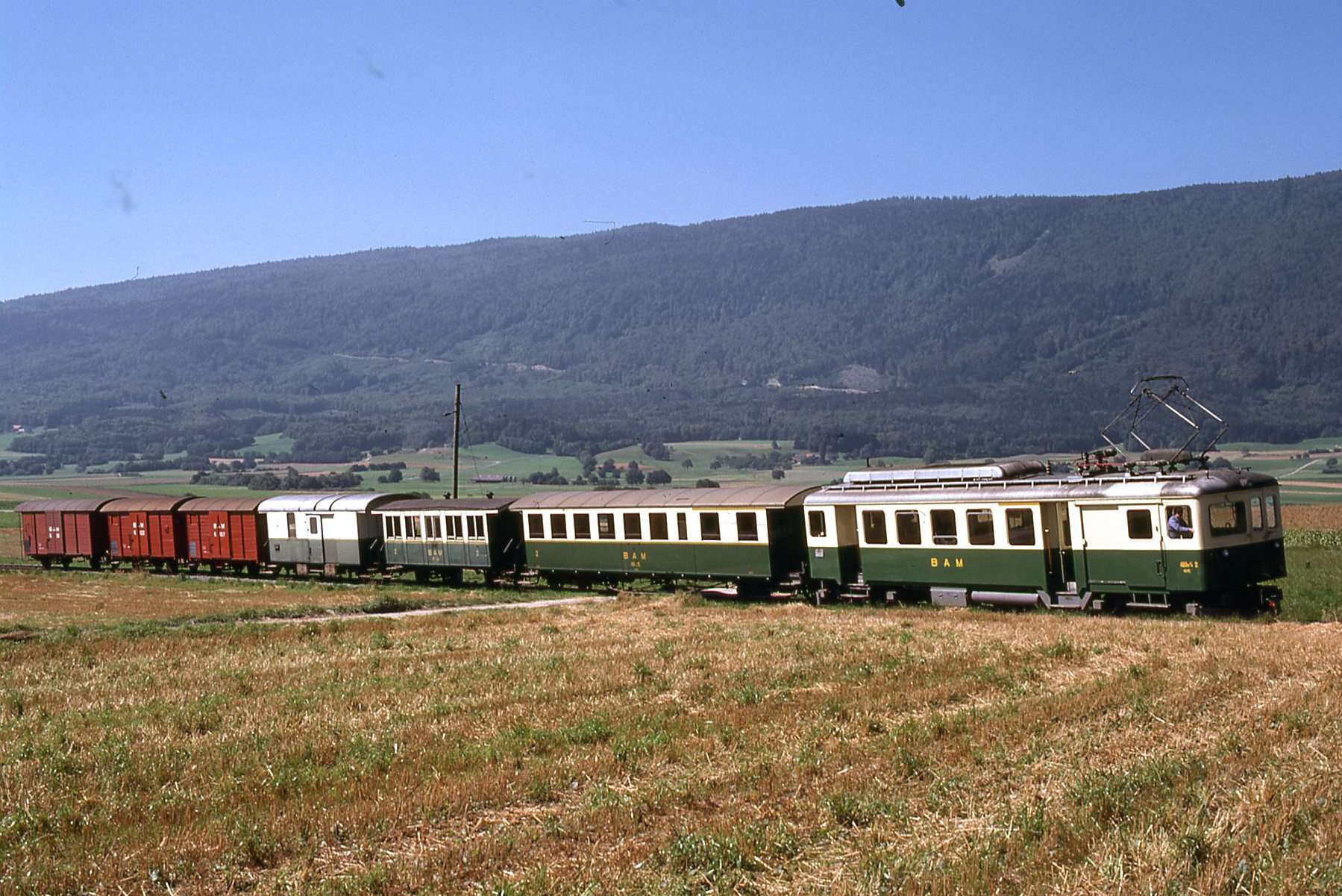
Mixed train, Bière–Apples–Morges railway, Switzerland, c.1970

== Exclusions ==
Not intended by this article is the definition of mixed train to describe:

- mixed freight.
- wagonload service (single wagons for various customers, assembled into trains), as opposed to trainload service (point to point, complete train for one customer).
- a passenger train that runs sections as an express, but makes frequent stops elsewhere.
- a train consisting of carriages of different classes (historical use).

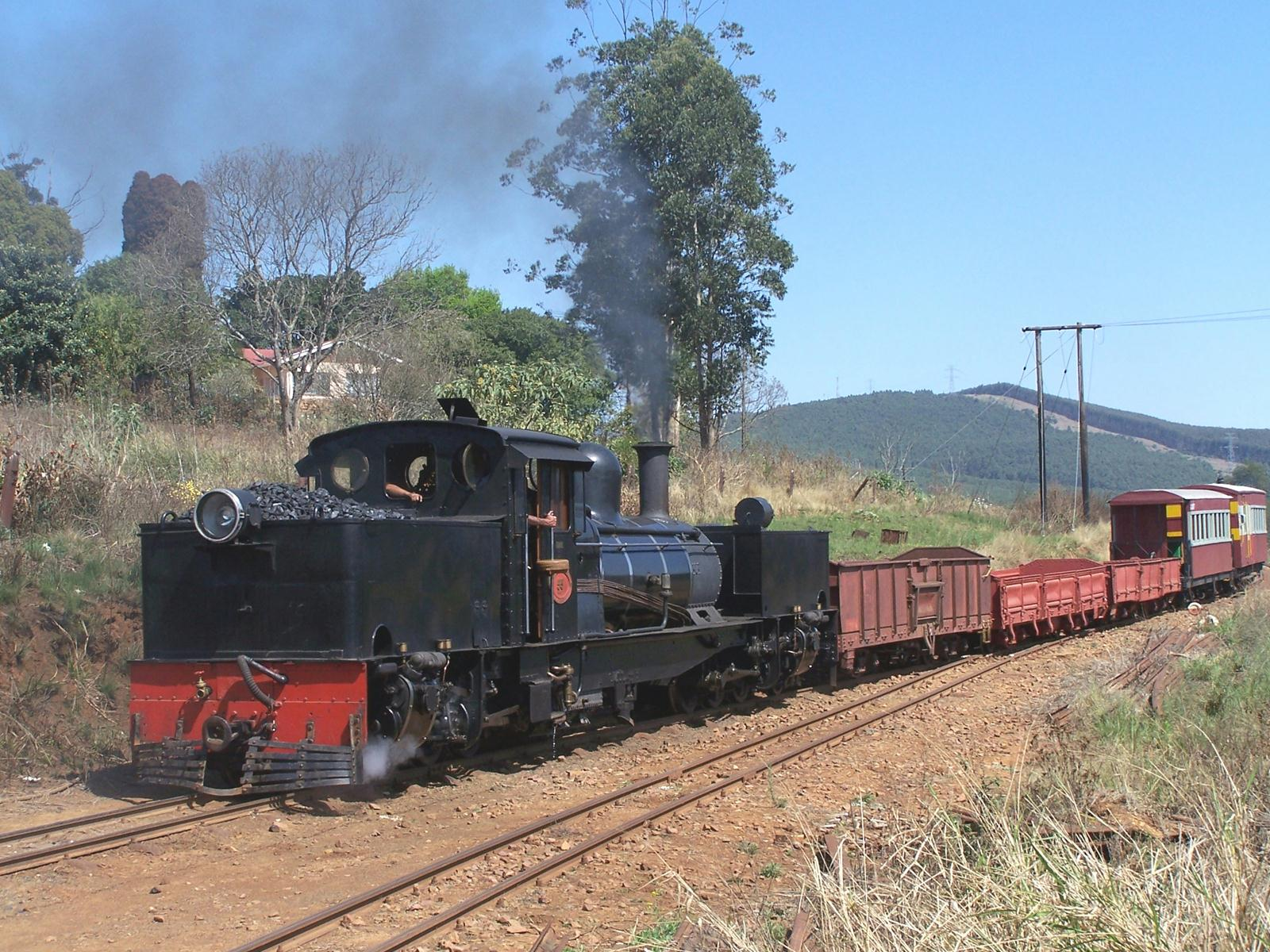
Mixed train near Ixopo, KwaZulu-Natal, 2005.

Passenger trains that can carry travellers' cars on freight wagons at the rear of the train are excluded. Called motorail, such services operate in Austria, Turkey, Czech Republic, Slovakia, Finland, Serbia, Australia, Canada, Chile, and the US.

Car shuttle trains, on which passengers travel within their vehicles, are also omitted.

== Africa and Asia ==
In parts of Asia and Africa, mixed trains still operate along corridors with reduced traffic. Routes include Asmara–Ghinda, Bulawayo–Harare, Elazığ–Tatvan, Fianarantsoa–Manakara, Kandy–Badulla, Livingstone–Mulobezi, Phnom Penh–Poipet, and Zahedan Mixed Passenger.

=== Philippines ===
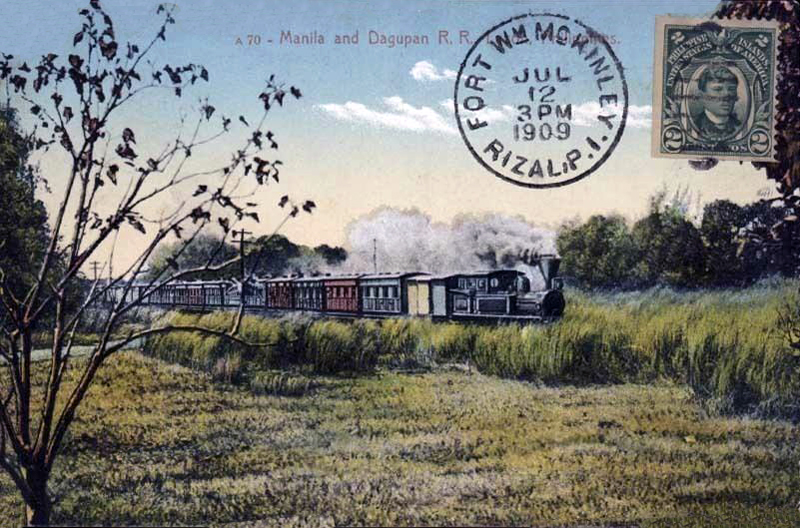
Due to lack of proper passenger railcars, third-class passengers on the Manila Railway occupied boxcars alongside freight.

A number of state-owned rail operators the island of Luzon; the Manila Railway, as well as the succeeding Manila Railroad and the present Philippine National Railways, operated mixed trains from its inception in 1892 until 1968. During the early days of the Ferrocarril de Manila a Dagupan line, now known as the North Main Line, third-class passengers normally occupied boxcars alongside freight on inter-city rail services, while first-class passengers were able to use true railcars hauled by tank locomotives. By 1956, the last mixed trains that continued to serve the South Main Line were the following; Train 506 from Manila to Tagkawayan station in Quezon province, and Train 504 to Naga station in Naga, Camarines Sur. Return services to Manila were numbered 505 and 503, respectively.

Hourly dedicated freight services started to replace mixed trains on the entire network by the 1960s. However, another mixed train service was reintroduced in 1967 through a deal with Legazpi mayor Luis Los Baños. A refrigerator car carrying agricultural produce was hauled alongside passenger trains to the Bicol Region. The service was short-lived and it was terminated after the April 1968 Mayon Volcano eruption. Train services eventually dwindled in ridership until all intercity rail services were suspended in 2013.

== Australia ==
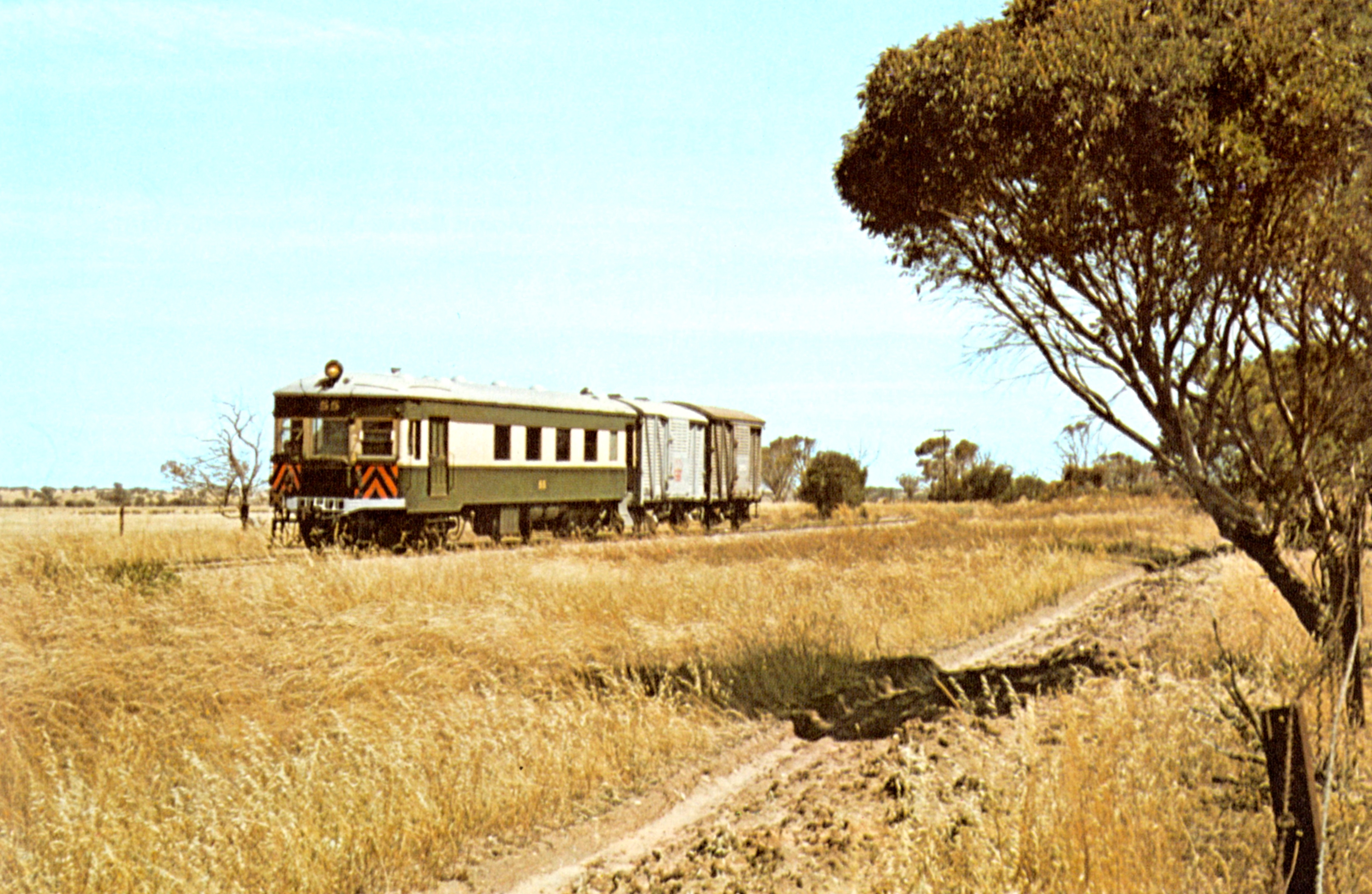
A scheduled South Australian Railways Brill railcar operated as a "mixed train" on the Milang railway line. The railcar usually towed one or two four-wheeled vehicles containing freight or livestock and performed shunting at the destination.

In Australia, mixed trains were variously named as such and as "mixed freight" or "mixed goods", "car goods", or "goods train with car attached". In most Australian states, a mixed train was technically a goods train with passenger accommodation, meaning it had lower priority over other trains, and could be cancelled without notice if there were no goods to carry.

The Victorian Railways had a class of train called a "limited through mixed", which limited the amount of goods and ran to a set timetable. It was guaranteed to run even without waiting goods.

Forming another type of mixed train, railmotors or railcars might haul one or two goods wagons or a goods brake van carrying some freight.

Skitube sometimes operates as a mixed service, as during winter there is no road access to Blue Cow Mountain.

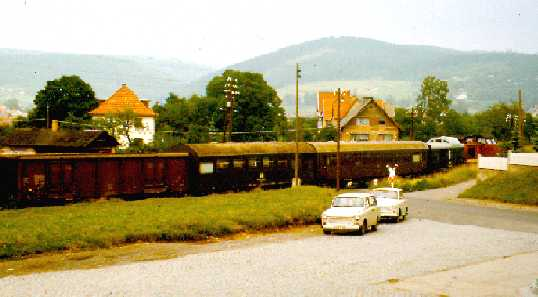
PmG mixed train, Floh-Seligenthal, Thuringia, East Germany, 1989

== Austria, Germany and Switzerland ==
In German-speaking countries, two main types of mixed train (Gemischter Zug) existed: the GmP and the PmG.

=== GmP ===
The GmP was a "goods train with passenger service" (Güterzug mit Personenbeförderung); namely a goods train with one or more passenger coaches. These were common on branch lines and were run for the following reasons:

- Low numbers of passengers that did not warrant the use of dedicated passenger trains.
- Insufficient rolling stock and/or railway staff to operate separate goods and passenger trains.
- High levels of traffic, requiring combined services for safe and efficient operation.

To reduce smoke exposure, the passenger coaches were usually located well back from the locomotive. However, when heating was required during cold weather, the coaches connected immediately behind the locomotive, because most goods wagons lacked heating-pipe conduits.

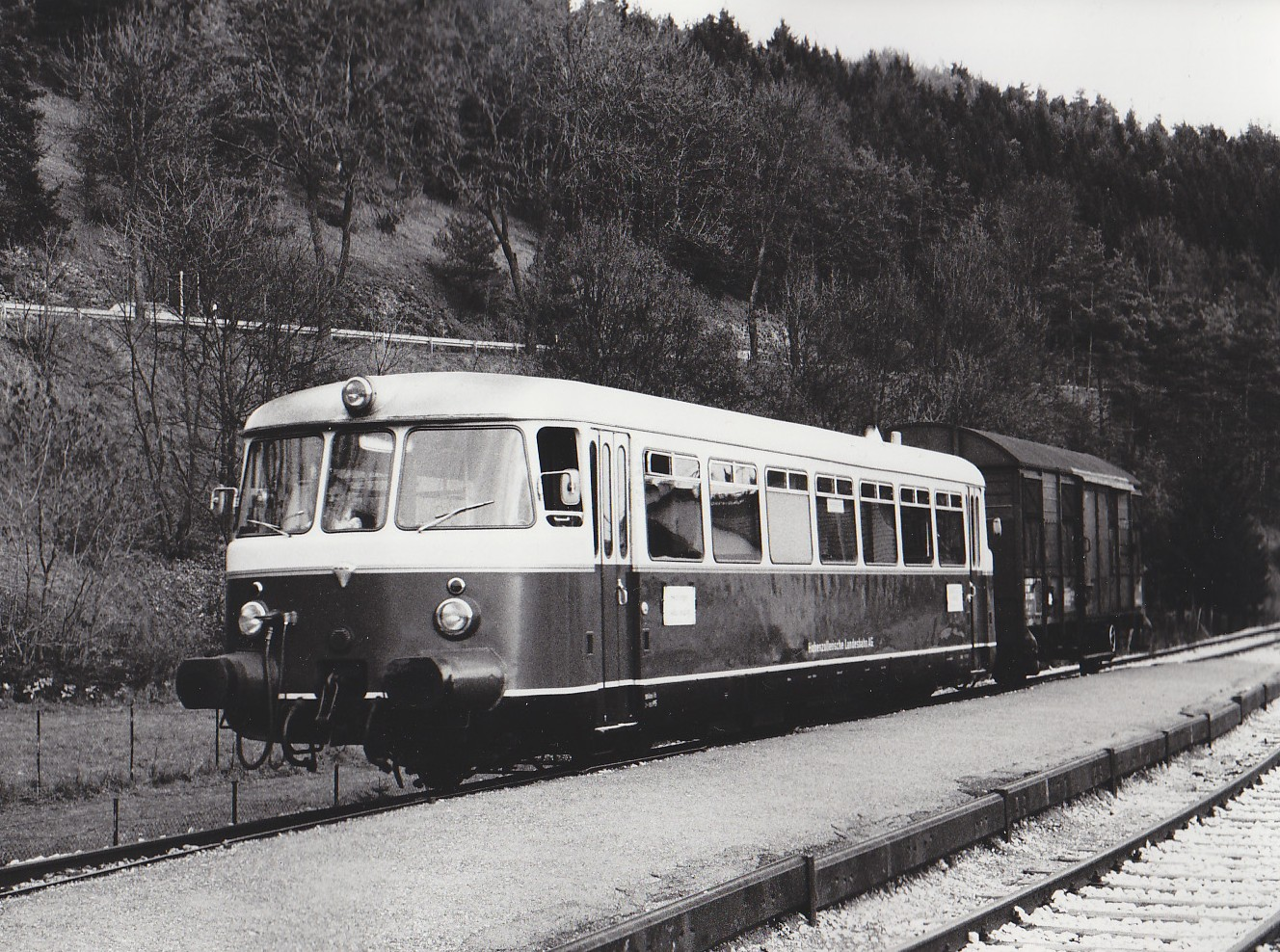
Mixed train of the Hohenzollerische Landesbahn, 1985

Into the 1980s, the Deutsche Bundesbahn ran GmP trains occasionally, but adding or detaching rolling stock created long wait times at stops, which contributed to their demise. They are no longer found in Germany, Austria or Switzerland.

=== PmG ===
The other variant in German-speaking countries was the PmG or "passenger train with goods service" (Personenzug mit Güterbeförderung). The Deutsche Reichsbahn in East Germany continued to operate some of these trains until the early 1990s. These comprised one or more goods wagons running behind the passenger coaches. Towards the end, no shunting took place at the intermediate stations. Some private railways once ran PmG trains.

Passenger trains transporting skiers, in places like Interlaken, still haul an open wagon for ski equipment.

== New Zealand ==
Mixed trains were once prolific in New Zealand. Although express trains operated on the main lines, mixed trains served rural branch lines where dedicated passenger services would be uneconomical. On the more significant provincial routes, substituting a mixed train during the off-season was common in the late 19th century (the Rotorua Express), or operating the provincial express twice or thrice weekly while mixed services ran daily (the Taneatua Express).

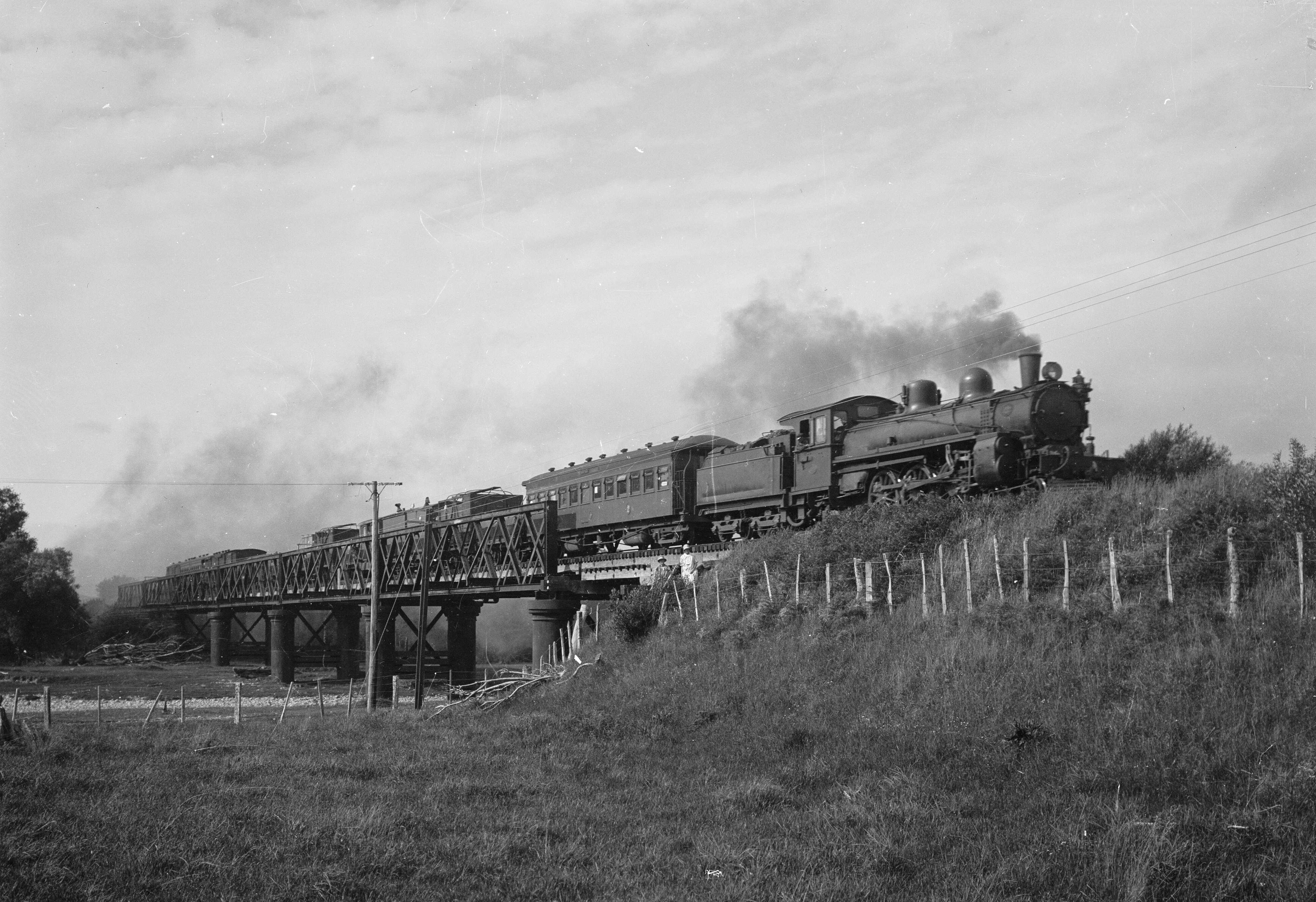
Mixed train, near Hukanui or Ormondville, c.1929.

The shortcomings of mixed trains for passenger travel led the New Zealand Railways Department to investigate railcar technology in the early 20th century. Overseas designs could not be easily adapted to New Zealand owing to its rugged conditions, 3-foot-6-inch (1.07 m) narrow gauge track, and small loading gauge. Early railcars trials, such as the RM class Model T Ford railbuses, proved unsatisfactory. When successfully introduced from the 1930s, railcars primarily replaced unprofitable provincial carriage trains, and some mixed services in regions such as the West Coast and Taranaki.

Mixed trains dominated the South Island's more extensive branch-line network, but as private car ownership increased in the 1930s, passenger traffic decreased, closing many rural train routes. However, some mixed services lasted into the 1960s in isolated regions with poor roads. In the North Island, the last mixed trains operated into the 1970s, where services on the North Auckland Line ran until 1976.

An updated type of mixed train existed in the South Island for a few years during the 1990s, when a few wagons of express containerised freight were attached to the TranzCoastal Picton–Christchurch express. Unlike prior era mixed trains, with their slow en route shunting, this time-sensitive freight travelled swiftly.

== North America ==
In North America, most branch lines, and sections of main lines, were worked by mixed trains. One or more passenger trains had served some routes, which switched to mixed trains as increased use of cars after the First World War depressed passenger traffic. These were freight trains, that rarely had more than one passenger car, and sometimes ran with a combined passenger, mail and baggage car. Distinct from the typical slow version was the Prince Rupert fish/passenger express. The former slower types were sometimes called way freights, whose end coincided with numerous passenger services over several decades terminating in the 1970s. In the US, the Seaboard Coast Line Atlanta–Augusta mixed train operated until 1983.

The last mixed train on the Canadian Pacific Railway was the Midland's Windsor–Truro, Nova Scotia mixed train, which operated until 1979. By 1990, mixed trains existed on only four routes in Canada, namely the Via Rail (formerly Canadian National Railway) Wabowden–Churchill (ceased 2002) and The Pas–Lynn Lake, the Ontario Northland Cochrane–Moosonee, and the Quebec North Shore and Labrador's Sept-Îles–Labrador City/Schefferville.

Currently, the Keewatin Railway's The Pas–Pukatawagan leases passenger cars from Via Rail. Tshiuetin Rail Transportation operates in northern Quebec. These operations are the two surviving mixed trains in North America.

== United Kingdom ==
The Birmingham and Gloucester Railway added passenger coaches to its daily goods in each direction from November 1841. (Note: Other United Kingdom railways may have done this earlier as the source does not claim it as a first)

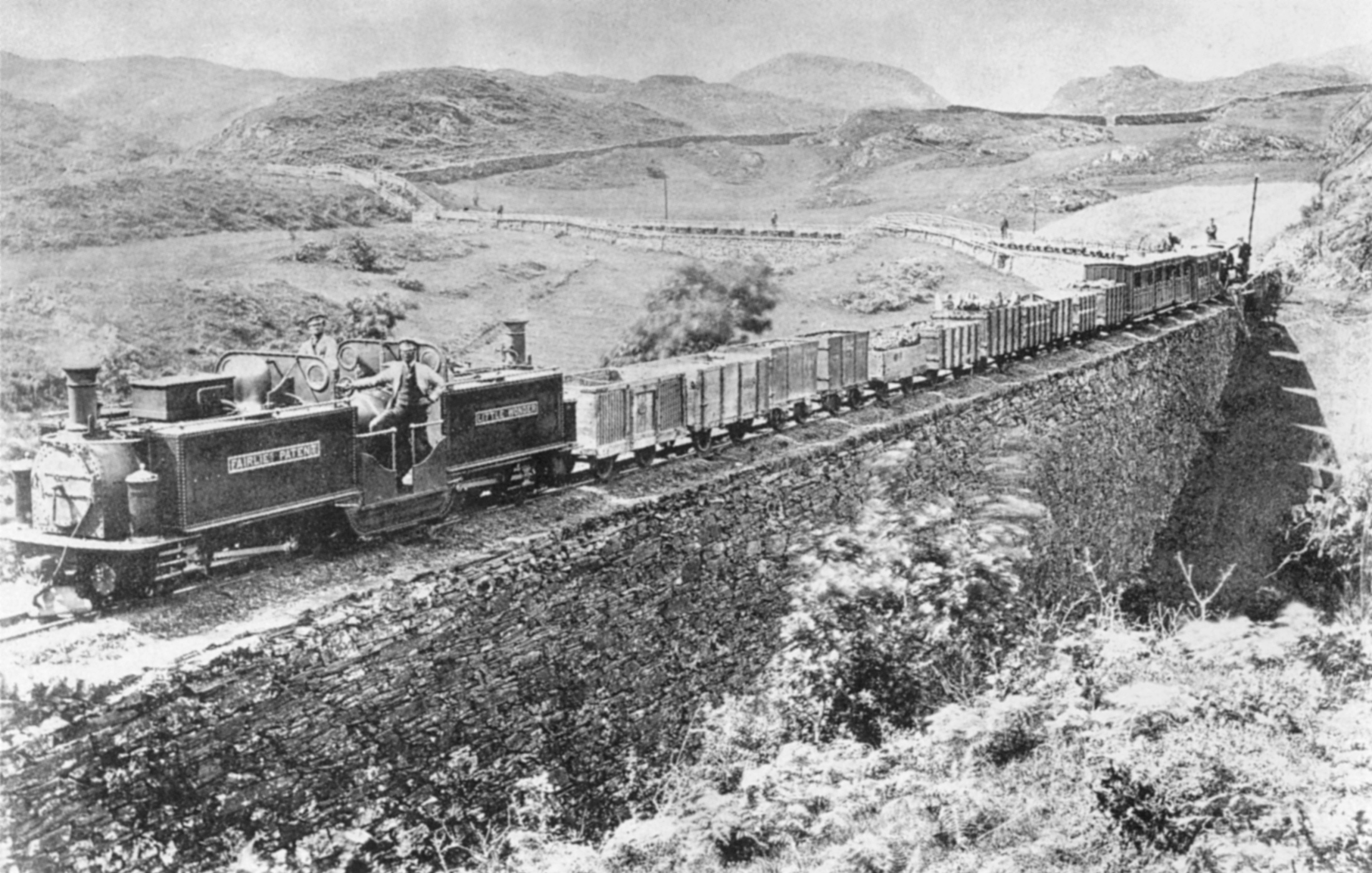
Mixed train, Ffestiniog Railway, 1871.

In 1864, the Ffestiniog Railway introduced mixed trains, with passenger coaches in the middle for the ascent. Down trains were run in up to four separate (uncoupled) portions: loaded slate wagons, goods wagons, passenger carriages and the locomotive running light. This practice changed to a whole descending train, headed by the locomotive, for safety reasons.

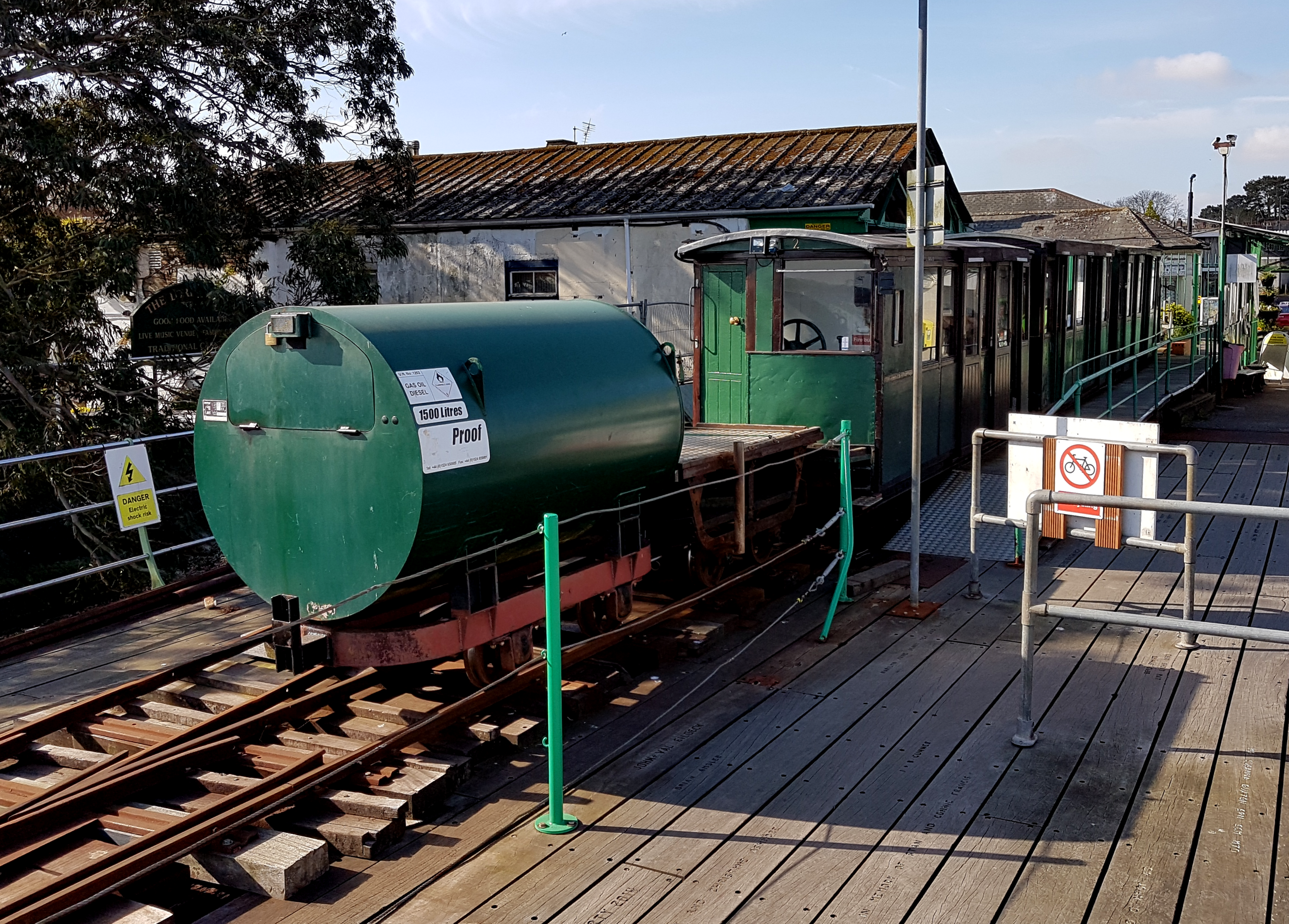
Hythe Pier Train, 2017.

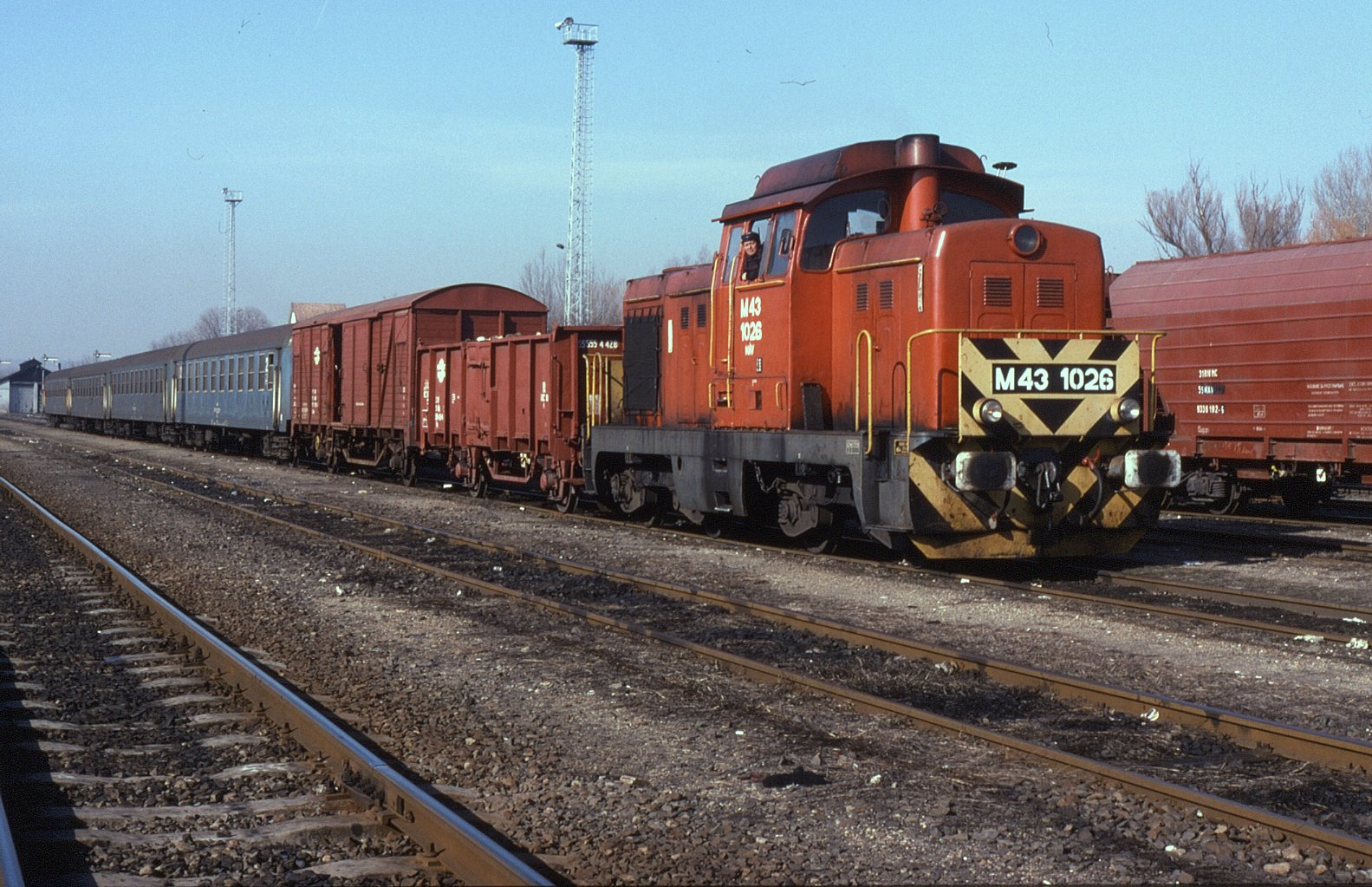
Mixed train, 1996 (Bátaszék, Hungary)

Opened in 1866, the Wrexham, Mold and Connah's Quay Railway operated mixed trains during its early years. On market days when space was at a premium, passengers sat on coal in the tender and crowded onto the footplate. The Regulation of Railways Act 1889 (52 & 53 Vict. c. 57) generally prohibited traditional mixed trains because the absence of continuous braking apparatus on wagons preceding the coaches jeopardized passenger safety. However, the Board of Trade exercised latitude in enforcing this rule, and some mixed trains ran until the end of the steam era.

Goods wagons/vans requiring speedy delivery could be attached to the end of passenger trains. This included horse boxes, cattle wagons, parcels vans, newspaper vans, fish vans, milk tanks and churn vans.

Possibly one of the last scheduled mixed services in the UK is the Hythe Pier, Railway and Ferry in Hampshire. This service is the oldest continually running pier train in the world (since 1922) and regularly carries diesel fuel to the pier head for the ferry.

== See also ==
- Bruck (vehicle)
