= Galangur Kotal railway station =

Railway station in Pakistan

General information
- Owner: Ministry of Railways

Other information
- Station code: GLRK

History
- Former names: Great Indian Peninsula Railway
Location

Galangur Kotal railway station (Urdu: گلنگر کوتل ریلوے اسٹیشن) is located in Balochistan, Pakistan on the Quetta-Taftan Line.

== See also ==
- List of railway stations in Pakistan
- Pakistan Railways
