= Afghanistan–Pakistan border barrier =

Border barrier being constructed by Pakistan at the Durand Line

- Fortification in Afghanistan, Pakistan
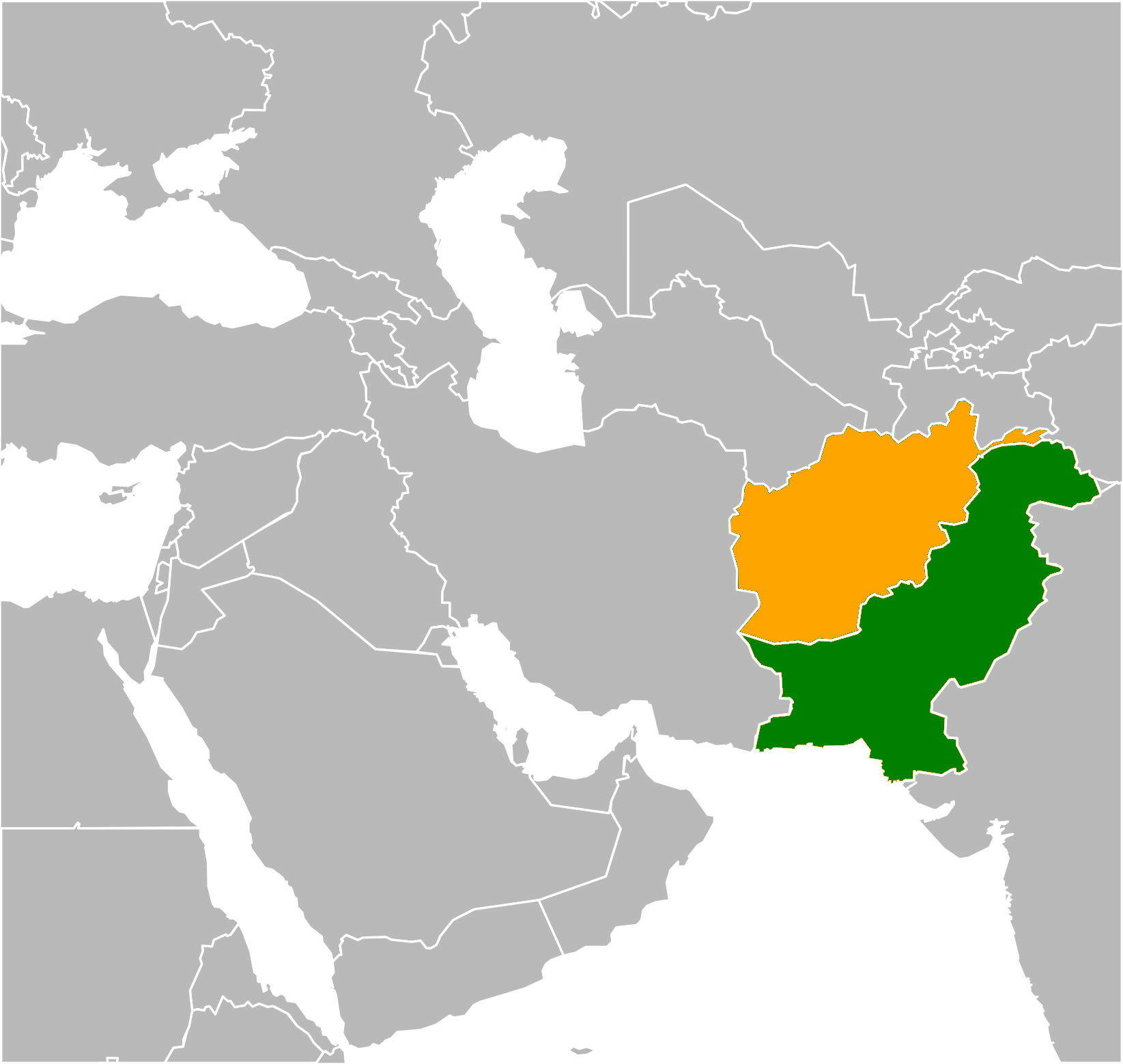
- Pak-Afghan International Map

Site information
- Type: Border barrier
- Owner: Government of Pakistan
- Operator: Ministry of Defence; Ministry of Interior
- Controlled by: Pakistan Armed Forces; Pakistan Army; XI Corps (Pakistan); XII Corps (Pakistan); Civil Armed Forces; Frontier Corps; FC KPK (N); FC KPK (S); FCB (N); FCB (S)
- Condition: Operational

Location
- Height: 4 metres (13 ft)
- Length: 2,640 km (1,640 mi): Balochistan portion = 1,268kms; Khyber Pakhtunkhwa portion = 1,343kms

Site history
- Built: 24 March 2017 – December 2023
- Built by: Pakistan
- In use: 2017–present
- Materials: Razor wire, steel, landmines
- Battles/wars: Afghanistan–Pakistan skirmishes; Insurgency in Balochistan; War in Afghanistan (2001–2021); War in North-West Pakistan

The Afghanistan–Pakistan border barrier refers to the border barrier being built by Pakistan since March 2017 along its border with Afghanistan. The purpose of the barrier is to prevent terrorism, arms, and drug trafficking, as well as refugees, illegal immigration, smuggling and infiltration across the approximately 2,670-kilometre-long (1,660 mi) international border between Afghanistan and Pakistan.

The Afghanistan–Pakistan border is marked by eight official crossing points and nearly 1,000 military forts. In addition to these forts, the Pakistan side of the border is also dotted with more than 1,200 border posts. There are over 400 forts in the northwestern area alone, complete with cameras and watchtowers, while more than 800 drones assisting the barrier. The Balochistan portion of the border is marked with roughly 600 forts. Before the 2021 Taliban capture of Afghanistan, the barrier and other measures were designed to impede the Afghan Taliban and Pakistani Taliban from freely crossing the border to coordinate and launch attacks against the governments of Afghanistan and Pakistan and evade authorities on either side. Despite the two Taliban organizations claiming to be completely separate from each other, Afghan Taliban leaders had been found operating from Afghan refugee camps in Pakistan and Pakistani Taliban leaders have been found hiding from Pakistani law enforcement in Taliban-controlled Afghanistan while systemically coordinating a joint militant network with their Afghan counterparts.

== Initial fencing plans ==
In September 2005, Pakistan stated it had plans to build a 2,400-kilometre (1,500 mi) fence along its border with Afghanistan to prevent insurgents and drug smugglers slipping between the two countries. The initially proposed fortifications and fence was backed by the United States in 2005. Major General Shaukat Sultan, a former Pakistani military spokesman, said the move was necessary to block the infiltration of militants across the border into Pakistan. Former Pakistani President Pervez Musharraf later offered to mine the border as well.

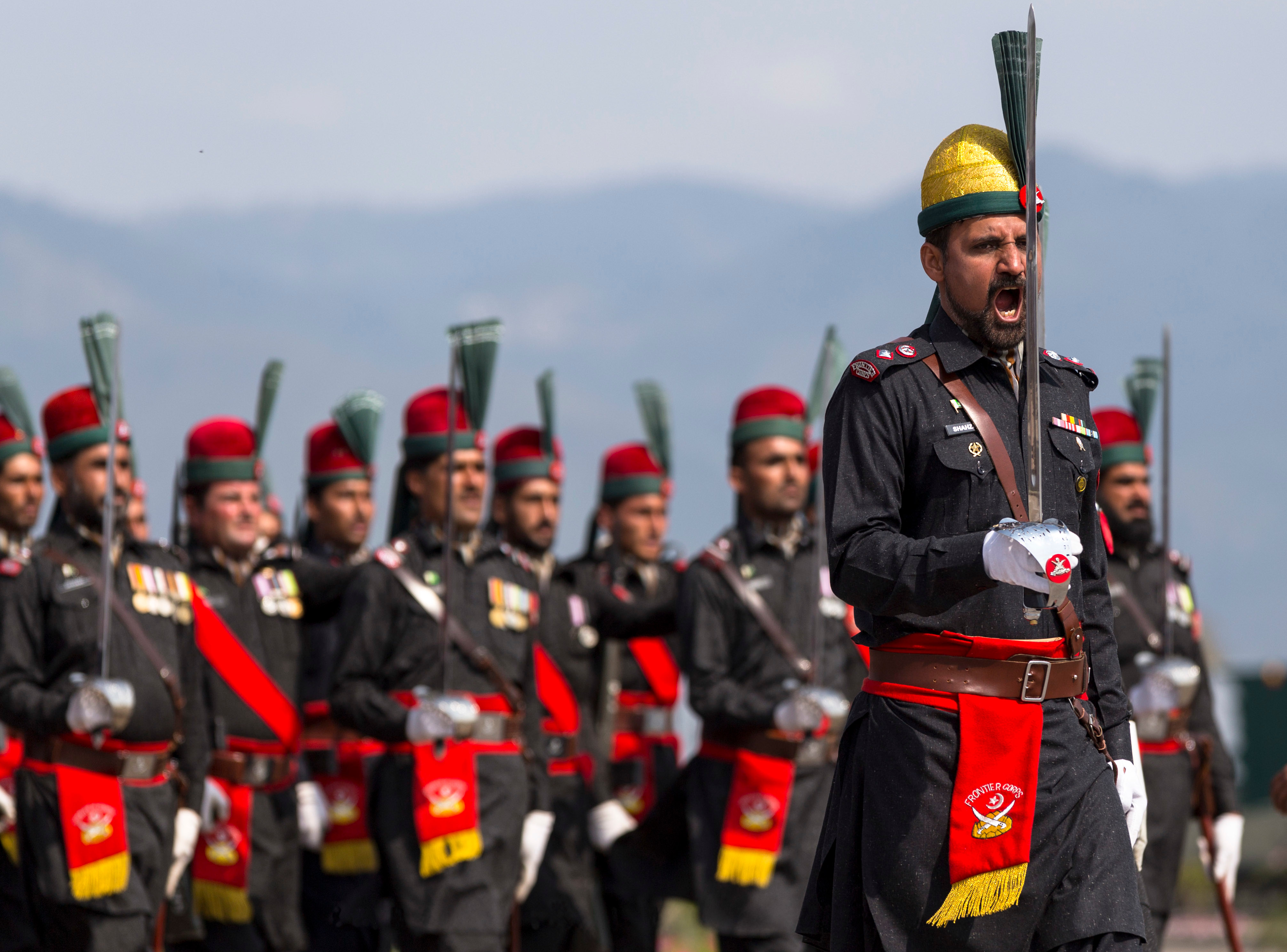
Frontier Corps act as a first line of defence at the western borders of Pakistan with Afghanistan and Iran.

The plans to fence and mine the border were again considered in 2007 and then in 2009, but they were not fully implemented. However, a 35-kilometre-long (22 mi) portion along selected border areas was fenced but the work was discontinued for lack of funds. In June 2011, Major General Athar Abbas, the then-spokesman for the army, said: "We did fence around 35km of the border area as it faced continuous militant incursions. It was a joint project of ISAF and Afghanistan. But then they backed out. It was a very costly project." During the Musharraf period, a biometric system was installed by Pakistan at border crossings. Afghanistan had objected to the system. The biometric system remains intact at the border, although it is yet to be made fully functional.

== Afghan opposition ==
Pakistani plans for fortifying, fencing and mining the border were renewed on 26 December 2006, but these plans were opposed by the Afghan government, citing that the fencing would result in "the limitation of the freedom of movement of tribal peoples". Due to Afghanistan's fierce opposition to the border fencing, the Angur Ada and Sheken areas saw a series of armed border skirmishes that resulted in cross−border artillery strikes launched by Pakistan in April 2007. On 1 April 2013, the Afghan Foreign Ministry formally protested and raised "grave concerns" over what it called "the Pakistani military's unilateral construction and physical reinforcement activities along the Afghanistan–Pakistan border in eastern Nangarhar province".

In Afghanistan some groups do not recognize the Durand Line itself as a legitimate border between it and Pakistan, as it divides the Pashtun tribes who live on both sides of the border. They contend that the installation of a physical barrier would divide people and make this border permanent.

== Construction progress and trenches ==
In June 2016, after three years of construction, Pakistan completed a 1,100 km (680 mi) trench along its border with Afghanistan from Balochistan to ensure proper border management. The initial excavation was largely carried out by the paramilitary Frontier Corps. The purpose of the trench is to tighten border security and create more favourable conditions for Pakistani security forces responsible for patrolling the border by deterring and restricting the flow of unauthorized entities, such as narcotics, militants, smugglers and general illegal movements of Afghan civilians or refugees. Three private construction companies from Pakistan's Balochistan province were contracted to supply manpower and oversee the arrangement of necessary equipment. The 4-metre-deep (13 ft) and 5-metre-wide (16 ft) trench was planned to be extended along the whole border.

As of January 2019, about 900 km (560 mi) of fortifications and fencing had been constructed. The fencing was about 94% complete as of 5 January 2022, and on 21 January 2022 the Interior Minister of Pakistan stated that only 20 km remained to be fenced in total. As of April 2023, 98% of fencing and 85% of fortifications had been completed.

The project was predicted to cost at least $532 million.

== Border Crossings and border markets ==
Border Crossings/markets with Afghanistan
	Crossing	Province	Purpose	Status
1	Angur Adda	Khyber Pakhtunkhwa-Paktika	Trade	Operational during day
2	Ghulam Khan	Khyber Pakhtunkhwa-Khost	Miscellaneous	Operational 24/6
3	Torkham	Khyber Pakhtunkhwa-Nangarhar	Miscellaneous	Operational 24/6
4	Kharlachi	Khyber Pakhtunkhwa-Paktia	Trade	Operational during day
5	Arandu	Khyber Pakhtunkhwa-Kunar	Trade	Operational during day
6	Bin Shahi	Khyber Pakhtunkhwa-Kunar	Trade	Operational during day
7	Chaman	Balochistan-Kandahar	Miscellaneous	Operational 24/6
8	Badini	Balochistan-Zabul	Trade	Operational during day

Torkham, Chaman and Ghulam Khan border crossings are 24/6 day/night operational crossings, excluding only Saturday which is reserved day for the pedestrian movement.

In 2020 the Government of Pakistan decided to establish 12 border markets along the Pakistan-Afghanistan border to facilitate trade and free movement. The Badini market in Zhob was inaugurated in 2020, effectively increasing trade and commerce between two countries.

== Border movement ==
Afghanistan-Pakistan border witnesses the movements of thousands of people per day through different border crossings. Thousands of trucks also use these points to move the goods from Pakistan to Afghanistan and Central Asia and vice versa. Statistics available with The Khorasan Diary, an independent news portal, show that 1,374,394 people have crossed on either side in one year, while 234,944 vehicles had passed through the border terminal in the same time frame.

== See also ==
- Afghanistan–Pakistan relations
  - Afghanistan–Pakistan border skirmishes
- Land border crossings of Pakistan
