= Nok Kundi railway station =

Railway station in Pakistan

Nok Kundi Railway Station نوک کنڈی ریلوے اسٹیشن

General information
- Coordinates: 28.8260°N 62.7461°E
- Owner: Ministry of Railways
- Line: Quetta-Taftan Railway Line

Other information
- Station code: KDD

Services
Preceding station	Pakistan Railways	Following station
Azad towards Quetta	Quetta–Taftan Line	Alam Reg towards Zahedan
Location

Nok Kundi Railway Station (Urdu: نوک کنڈی ریلوے اسٹیشن, Balochi:نوک کنڈی ریلوے اسٹیشن) is located in Nok Kundi, Balochistan, Pakistan.

== See also ==
- List of railway stations in Pakistan
- Pakistan Railways
