= Khan Muhammad Chah railway station =

Railway station

Khan Muhammad Chah Station ایستگاه راه آهن خان محمد چاہ

General information
- Owner: Ministry of Railways
- Line: Quetta-Taftan Railway Line

Other information
- Station code: QMX

Services
Preceding station	Pakistan Railways	Following station
Mirjawa towards Quetta	Quetta–Taftan Line	Zahedan Terminus
Location

Khan Muhammad Chah Railway Station (Persian: ایستگاه راه آهن خان محمد چاہ) is a railway station at Khan Mohammadchah, Iran. It is one of three Pakistan Railways stations in Iran.

== See also ==
- List of railway stations in Pakistan
- Pakistan Railways
