= Azad railway station =

Railway station in Balochistan, Pakistan

Azad Railway Station آزاد ریلوے اسٹیشن

General information
- Coordinates: 28.7502°N 63.1373°E
- Owner: Ministry of Railways
- Line: Quetta-Taftan Line

Other information
- Station code: AZT

Services
Preceding station	Pakistan Railways	Following station
Gat towards Quetta	Quetta–Taftan Line	Nok Kundi towards Zahedan
Location

Azad Railway Station (Urdu: آزاد ریلوے اسٹیشن, Balochi: آزاد ریلوے اسٹیشن) is located in Balochistan, Pakistan.

== See also ==
- List of railway stations in Pakistan
- Pakistan Railways
