= Alam Reg railway station =

Railway station in Pakistan

Alam Reg Railway Station عالم ریگ ریلوے اسٹیشن

General information
- Coordinates: 28.83191°N 62.46775°E
- Owner: Ministry of Railways
- Line: Quetta-Taftan Railway Line

Other information
- Station code: ALG

Services
Preceding station	Pakistan Railways	Following station
Nok Kundi towards Quetta	Quetta–Taftan Line	Tozghi towards Zahedan
Location

Alam Reg Railway Station (Urdu: عالم ریگ ریلوے اسٹیشن, Balochi: عالم ریگ ریلوے اسٹیشن) is located in Alam Reg, Balochistan, Pakistan.

== See also ==
- List of railway stations in Pakistan
- Pakistan Railways
