= Nushki railway station =

Railway station in Pakistan

Nushki Railway Station نوشکی ریلوے اسٹیشن
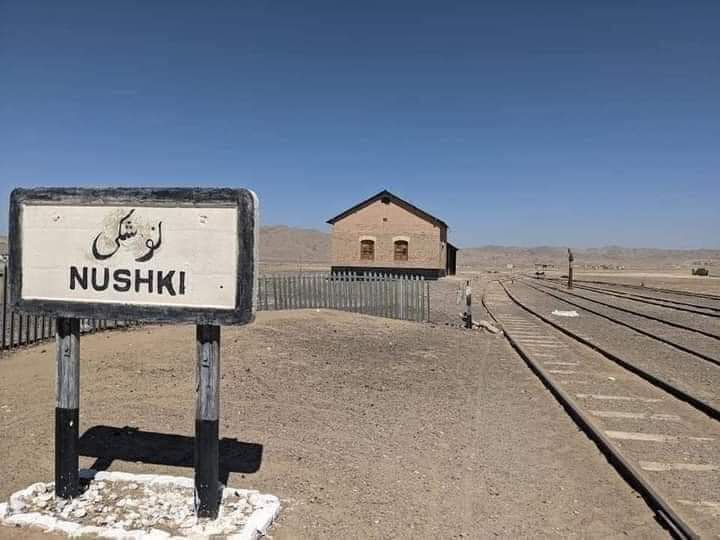

General information
- Owner: Ministry of Railways
- Line: Quetta-Taftan Line

Other information
- Station code: NSE

Services
Preceding station	Pakistan Railways	Following station
Ablak towards Quetta	Quetta–Taftan Line	Ahmedwal towards Zahedan
Location

Nushki Railway Station (Urdu: نوشکی ریلوے اسٹیشن, Balochi: نوشکی ریلوے اسٹیشن) is located in Nushki town, Nushki district of Balochistan province of Pakistan.

It is part of the ancient Indo-Persian route from Quetta to Sistan. The Quetta to Sistan route was opened in 1897.

== See also ==
- List of railway stations in Pakistan
- Pakistan Railways
