= Wali Khan railway station =

Railway station in Pakistan

Wali Khan Railway Station ولی خان ریلوے اسٹیشن
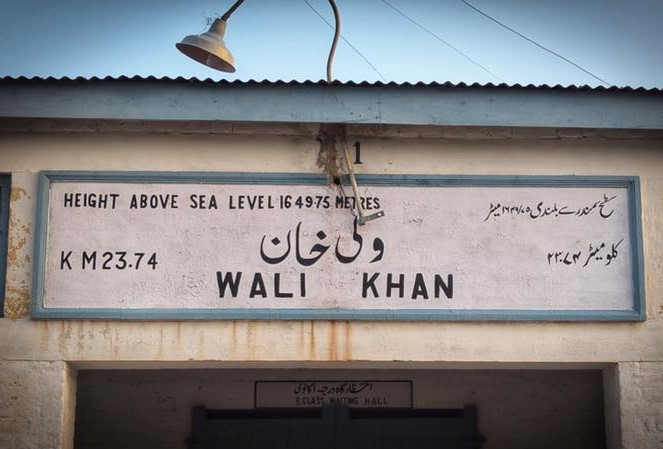

General information
- Coordinates: 29.8783°N 66.8414°E
- Owner: Ministry of Railways
- Line: Quetta-Taftan Railway Line

Other information
- Station code: WLN

Services
Preceding station	Pakistan Railways	Following station
Mastung Road towards Quetta	Quetta–Taftan Line	Sheikh Wasil towards Zahedan
Location

Wali Khan Railway Station (Urdu: ولی خان ریلوے اسٹیشن, Balochi: والی خان ریلوے اسٹیشن ) is located in Pakistan.

== Gallery ==
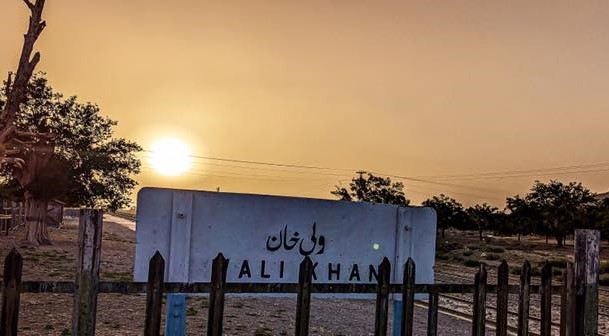

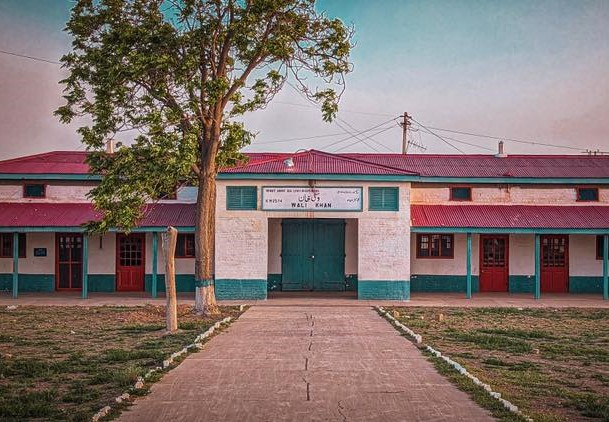

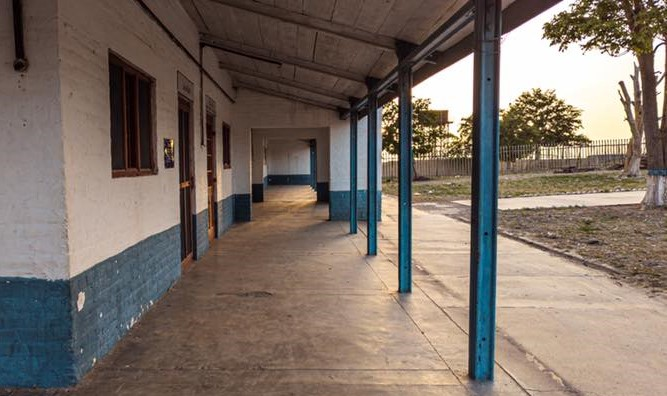

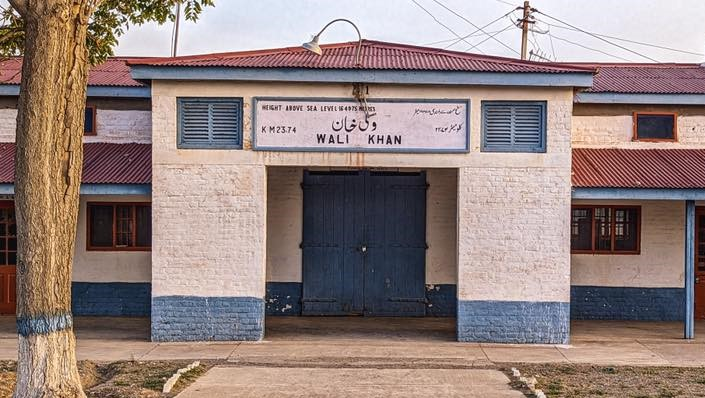

== See also ==
- List of railway stations in Pakistan
- Pakistan Railways
