= Dalbandin Rifles =

Pakistani paramilitary unit

- Country: Pakistan
- Branch: Civil Armed Forces
- Size: 9 battalion-sized wings
- Part of: Frontier Corps Baluchistan (South)
- Garrison/HQ: Dalbandin, Chagai

Commanders
- Current Commander: Colonel Sikandar Hayat

The Dalbandin Rifles is a paramilitary regiment forming part of the Pakistani Frontier Corps Balochistan (South). It is named after the town of Dalbandin in Chagai District, Balochistan, Pakistan. The Rifles have a 2020/21 budget of Rs. 1.137 billion and are tasked with defending part of the border with Afghanistan and assisting with law enforcement in the districts adjacent to the border.

The regiment was involved in controversy in August 2019 when a major was jailed for bribery in relation to a missing persons case.

== Units ==
- Headquarters Wing
- 56 Wing
- 58 Wing
- 106 Wing
- 113 Wing
- 125 Wing
- 126 Wing
- 128 Wing
- 133 Wing
- 146 Wing
