= Sheikh Wasil railway station =

Railway station in Pakistan

Sheikh Wasil Station شیخ واصل ریلوے اسٹیشن

General information
- Coordinates: 29.8963°N 66.6176°E
- Owner: Ministry of Railways
- Line: Quetta-Taftan Line

Other information
- Station code: SWK

Services
Preceding station	Pakistan Railways	Following station
Wali Khan towards Quetta	Quetta–Taftan Line	Galangur towards Zahedan
Location

Sheikh Wasil Railway Station (Urdu: شیخ واصل ریلوے اسٹیشن, Balochi: شیخ واصل ریلوے اسٹیشن ) is located in Pakistan.

== See also ==
- List of railway stations in Pakistan
- Pakistan Railways
