= Galangur railway station =

Railway station in Pakistan

Coordinates: 29.593652°N 66.273878°E

Galangur Railway Station گلنگر ریلوے اسٹیشن

General information
- Owner: Ministry of Railways
- Line: Quetta-Taftan Line

Other information
- Station code: GAN

Services
Preceding station	Pakistan Railways	Following station
Sheikh Wasil towards Quetta	Quetta–Taftan Line	Kishingi towards Zahedan
Location

Galangur Railway Station (Urdu: گلنگر ریلوے اسٹیشن, Balochi: گلنگر ریلوے اسٹیشن) is located in Pakistan.

== See also ==
- List of railway stations in Pakistan
- Pakistan Railways
