= Tozghi railway station =

Railway station in Pakistan

Tozghi Railway Station توزگھئی ریلوے اسٹیشن

General information
- Coordinates: 28.8019°N 62.2785°E
- Owner: Ministry of Railways
- Line: Quetta-Taftan Railway Line

Other information
- Station code: TZG

Services
Preceding station	Pakistan Railways	Following station
Alam Reg towards Quetta	Quetta–Taftan Line	Koh-e-Taftan towards Zahedan
Location

Tozghi Railway Station (Urdu: توزگھئی ریلوے اسٹیشن, Balochi:توزگھئی ریلوے اسٹیشن ) is located in Tozghi, Balochistan, Pakistan.

== See also ==
- List of railway stations in Pakistan
- Pakistan Railways
