= Boundary Pillar railway station =

Railway station in Balochistan, Pakistan

Coordinates: 28.9745°N 61.5519°E

Boundary Pillar Station باؤنڈری پلر ریلوے اسٹیشن

General information
- Owner: Ministry of Railways
- Line: Quetta–Taftan Railway Line

Other information
- Station code: NP72

Services
Preceding station	Pakistan Railways	Following station
Koh-e-Taftan towards Quetta	Quetta–Taftan Line	Mirjawa towards Zahedan
Location
- Location within Balochistan, Pakistan Location within Pakistan

Boundary Pillar Railway Station (Urdu: سرحد ستون اسٹیشن, Balochi: باؤنڈری پلر ریلوے اسٹیشن) is the border station between Iran and Pakistan.

== See also ==
- List of railway stations in Pakistan
- Pakistan Railways
