= Gat railway station =

Railway station in Chagai District, Pakistan

Gat Railway Station گاٹ ریلوے اسٹیشن

General information
- Coordinates: 28.71075°N 63.32416°E
- Owner: Ministry of Railways
- Line: Quetta-Taftan Line

Other information
- Station code: GUZ

Services
Preceding station	Pakistan Railways	Following station
Yakmach towards Quetta	Quetta–Taftan Line	Azad towards Zahedan
Location

Gat Railway Station (Urdu: گاٹ ریلوے اسٹیشن, Balochi: گاٹ ریلوے اسٹیشن ) is located in Balochistan, Pakistan.

== See also ==
- List of railway stations in Pakistan
- Pakistan Railways
