= Spezand Junction railway station =

Railway station in Pakistan

Spezand Junction Railway Station سپیزنڈ جنکشن ریلوے اسٹیشن
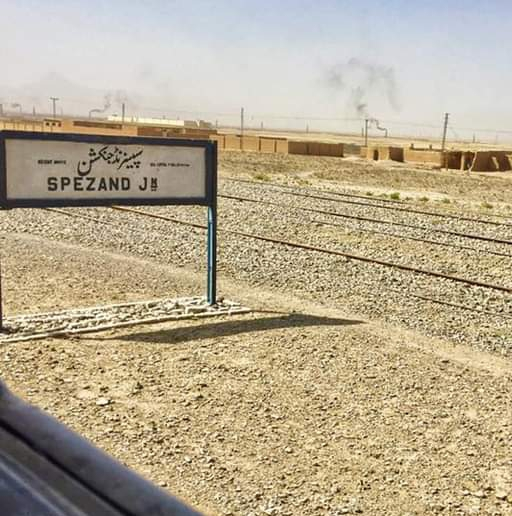

General information
- Coordinates: 29.9802°N 66.9996°E
- Owner: Ministry of Railways
- Lines: Rohri-Chaman Railway Line; Quetta-Taftan Railway Line

Other information
- Station code: SZD

Services
Preceding station	Pakistan Railways	Following station
Kolpur towards Rohri Junction	Rohri–Chaman Line	Sar-I-Ab towards Chaman
Sar-I-Ab towards Quetta	Quetta–Taftan Line	Mastung Road towards Zahedan
Location
- Location within Balochistan, Pakistan Location within Pakistan

Spezand Junction Railway Station (Urdu: سپیزنڈ جنکشن ریلوے اسٹیشن, Balochi: سپیزنڈ جوڑ اسٹیشن ) is located in Spezand town, Mastung District of Balochistan province of the Pakistan.

== See also ==
- List of railway stations in Pakistan
- Pakistan Railways
