= Sar-I-Ab railway station =

Railway station in Pakistan

Sar-i-Ab سر آب

General information
- Coordinates: 30.1034°N 66.9815°E
- Owner: Ministry of Railways
- Lines: Rohri-Chaman Railway Line; Quetta-Taftan Railway Line

Other information
- Station code: SRB

Services
| Preceding station | Pakistan Railways | Following station |
|---|---|---|
| Spezand Junction towards Rohri Junction | Rohri–Chaman Line | Quetta towards Chaman |
| Quetta Terminus | Quetta–Taftan Line | Spezand Junction towards Zahedan |
Location

Sar-i-Ab (Urdu: سر آب ریلوے اسٹیشن, Balochi:سر آب ریلوے اسٹیشن) is a railway station located in Sar-I-Ab village, Quetta district of Balochistan province in Pakistan.

== See also ==
- List of railway stations in Pakistan
- Pakistan Railways
