= Nok Chah railway station =

Railway station in Pakistan

General information
- Coordinates: 28.9598°N 64.8169°E
- Owner: Ministry of Railways

Other information
- Station code: NKG

History
- Former names: Great Indian Peninsula Railway
Location

Nok Chah railway station (Urdu: نوک چاہ ریلوے اسٹیشن) is located in Pakistan.

== See also ==
- List of railway stations in Pakistan
- Pakistan Railways
