= Reg-I-Malik railway station =

Railway station in Pakistan

Coordinates: 28.949462°N 61.731118°E

General information
- Owner: Ministry of Railways

Other information
- Station code: RGC

History
- Former names: Great Indian Peninsula Railway
Location

Reg-I-Malik railway station (Urdu: ریگ ملک ریلوے اسٹیشن) is located in Pakistan.

== See also ==
- List of railway stations in Pakistan
- Pakistan Railways
