= Zangiabad railway station =

Railway station in Pakistan

General information
- Coordinates: 29.43333°N 65.98333°E
- Owner: Ministry of Railways

Other information
- Station code: ZGB

History
- Former names: Great Indian Peninsula Railway
Location

Zangiabad railway station (Urdu: زانگی آباد ریلوے اسٹیشن) is located in Pakistan.

== See also ==
- List of railway stations in Pakistan
- Pakistan Railways
