= Barag Khurd railway station =

Railway station in Pakistan

Barag Khurd Railway Station

General information
- Coordinates: 29.811661°N 66.483421°E
- Owner: Ministry of Railways

Other information
- Station code: BFK

History
- Former names: Great Indian Peninsula Railway
Location
- Location within Balochistan, Pakistan Location within Pakistan

Barag Khurd Railway Station (Urdu: برگ خرد ریلوے اسٹیشن) is located in Pakistan.

== See also ==
- List of railway stations in Pakistan
- Pakistan Railways
