= Kanak railway station =

Railway station in Pakistan

General information
- Coordinates: 29.8984°N 66.7402°E
- Owner: Ministry of Railways

Other information
- Station code: KBF

History
- Former names: Great Indian Peninsula Railway
Location

Kanak railway station (Urdu: کانک ریلوے اسٹیشن) is located in Pakistan.

== See also ==
- List of railway stations in Pakistan
- Pakistan Railways
