= Mirjaveh railway station =

Railway station in Iran

Mirjaveh Railway Station ایستگاه راه آهن میرجاوه

General information
- Owner: Ministry of Railways
- Line: Quetta-Taftan Railway Line

Other information
- Station code: MJB

Services
Preceding station	Pakistan Railways	Following station
Boundary Pillar towards Quetta	Quetta–Taftan Line	Khan Muhammad Chah towards Zahedan
Location

Mirjaveh Railway Station (Persian: ایستگاه راه آهن میرجاوه) or Mirjawa railway station is located in Mirjaveh, Iran. It is one of three Pakistan Railways stations in Iran.

== See also ==
- List of railway stations in Iran
- Pakistan Railways
