= Pishok railway station =

Railway station in Pakistan

Pishok Railway Station

General information
- Owner: Ministry of Railways

Other information
- Station code: POK

History
- Former names: Great Indian Peninsula Railway

Pishok Railway Station (Urdu: پشوک ریلوے اسٹیشن) is located in Pakistan.

== See also ==
- List of railway stations in Pakistan
- Pakistan Railways
