= Taloo railway station =

Railway station in Pakistan

Coordinates: 28.838483°N 64.219965°E

General information
- Owner: Ministry of Railways

Other information
- Station code: TLQ

History
- Former names: Great Indian Peninsula Railway
Location

Taloo railway station (Urdu: تلو ریلوے اسٹیشن) is located in Pakistan.

== See also ==
- List of railway stations in Pakistan
- Pakistan Railways
