= Warechah railway station =

Railway station in Pakistan

General information
- Coordinates: 28.8654°N 61.9084°E
- Owner: Ministry of Railways

Other information
- Station code: WCH

History
- Former names: Great Indian Peninsula Railway
Location

Warechah railway station (Urdu: وارچا ریلوے اسٹیشن) is located in Pakistan.

== See also ==
- List of railway stations in Pakistan
- Pakistan Railways
