= Ghulam Khan =

Residential Town in Pakistan

Ghulam Khan غلام خان غلام خان
- Town
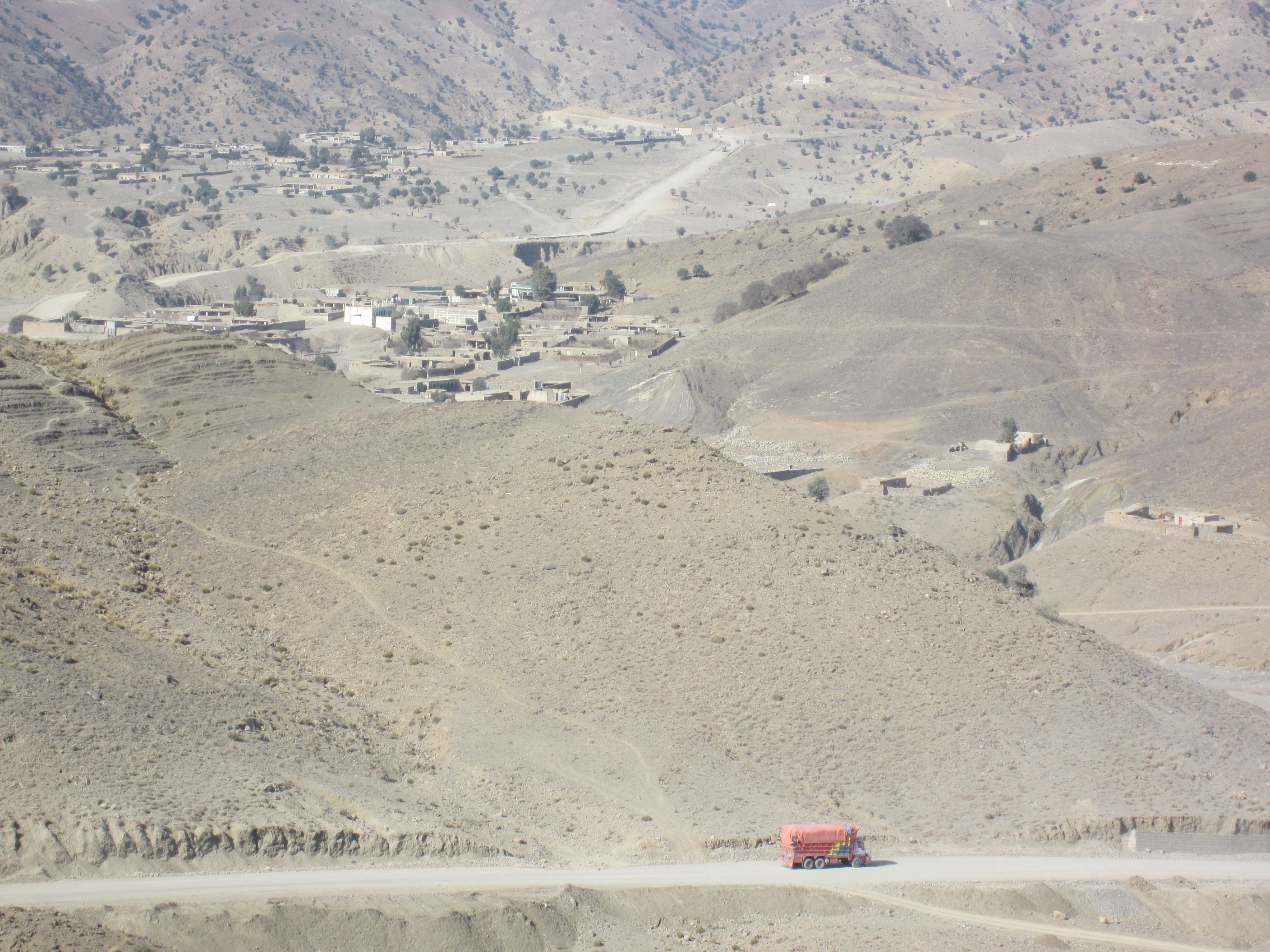

- Location within Khyber Pakhtunkhwa Location within Pakistan
- Coordinates: 33°08′38″N 70°01′26″E
- Country: Pakistan
- Province: Khyber Pakhtunkhwa
- District: North Waziristan
- Tehsil: Ghulam Khan
- Elevation: 2,010 m (6,590 ft)

Population (2017 Census of Pakistan)
  - Total: 2,553
- Time zone: UTC+5 (PST)

Ghulām Khān (Pashto/Urdu: غلام خان) is a town in the North Waziristan District of Bannu Division in the Khyber Pakhtunkhwa province of Pakistan. Ghulam Khan is on the border between Pakistan and Afghanistan.

It is the third most important border crossing point between Pakistan and Afghanistan, after Chaman and Torkham. It connects Khost, Afghanistan, to Bannu, Pakistan.

The border reopened for trade between Pakistan and Afghanistan on 9 March 2018.

North Waziristan region including this residential town, Ghulam Khan, has a total population of 543,254 per 2017 Census of Pakistan.
