= Dalbandin =

City in Balochistan, Pakistan

Dalbandin دالبندین
- Location within Balochistan, Pakistan Location within Pakistan
- Coordinates: 28°53′39.26″N 64°23′54.94″E
- Country: Pakistan
- Province: Balochistan
- District: Chagai

Government
- Elevation: 843 m (2,766 ft)

Population (2023)
  - Total: 20,054
- Demonym: Dalbandinis
- Time zone: UTC+5 (PST)
- Postal code: 95100
- Calling code: 0825
- Highways: N-40

Dalbandin (Urdu and Balochi: دالبندین) is a city and the headquarter of Chagai district in Pakistan's Balochistan province, near the Iran and Afghanistan border. The city has a population of 16,319, and the remainder of the entire Dalbandin Tehsil has a population of 110,503. It is located at an altitude of 843 m (2769 ft). Dalbandin is famous for its fruit orchards. Dalbandin city is surrounded by desert and mountains. An Afghan refugee camp (Girdi Jungle) is located on Dalbandin Chagai Road.

== Etymology ==
The name of city has a little story. Before the advent of the British into the Sub-Continent, the territory was known as Naalbandin. The people in this area were expert farriers, that were regionally known Naalbandin. But the English people could not properly pronounce the word Naalbandin and modified it into Dalbandin.

== Demographics ==
=== Population ===
Historical population
Year	Pop.	±% p.a.
1951	...	—
1961	1,724	—
1972	2,862	+4.72%
1981	...	—
1998	11,948	—
2017	16,265	+1.64%
2023	20,054	+3.55%

As of the 2023 census, Dalbandin has population of 20,054.

== Climate ==
Dalbandin has a hot desert climate (Köppen climate classification BWh) with extremely hot summers and cool winters. The climate is dry whole the year, but some rain does fall in the Winter. Sandstorms occasionally occurred in the whole year.

Climate data for Dalbandin (1991–2020, extremes 1957–present)
Month	Jan	Feb	Mar	Apr	May	Jun	Jul	Aug	Sep	Oct	Nov	Dec	Year
Record high °C (°F)	30.5 (86.9)	36.0 (96.8)	40.0 (104.0)	43.5 (110.3)	47.0 (116.6)	48.8 (119.8)	51.4 (124.5)	51.6 (124.9)	45.5 (113.9)	42.2 (108.0)	38.0 (100.4)	31.4 (88.5)	51.6 (124.9)
Mean daily maximum °C (°F)	19.0 (66.2)	22.1 (71.8)	27.5 (81.5)	34.2 (93.6)	39.6 (103.3)	42.8 (109.0)	43.6 (110.5)	42.1 (107.8)	39.0 (102.2)	33.6 (92.5)	26.7 (80.1)	21.1 (70.0)	32.6 (90.7)
Daily mean °C (°F)	10.6 (51.1)	13.6 (56.5)	18.9 (66.0)	25.1 (77.2)	30.4 (86.7)	33.7 (92.7)	35.0 (95.0)	32.8 (91.0)	28.8 (83.8)	22.9 (73.2)	16.5 (61.7)	11.6 (52.9)	23.3 (74.0)
Mean daily minimum °C (°F)	1.8 (35.2)	5.1 (41.2)	10.2 (50.4)	16.1 (61.0)	21.4 (70.5)	24.5 (76.1)	26.2 (79.2)	23.5 (74.3)	18.6 (65.5)	12.4 (54.3)	6.6 (43.9)	2.2 (36.0)	14.1 (57.4)
Record low °C (°F)	−11.1 (12.0)	−8.5 (16.7)	−3.5 (25.7)	2.2 (36.0)	7.0 (44.6)	12.8 (55.0)	17.8 (64.0)	8.3 (46.9)	7.0 (44.6)	−1.0 (30.2)	−8.0 (17.6)	−12.2 (10.0)	−12.2 (10.0)
Average precipitation mm (inches)	19.7 (0.78)	14.3 (0.56)	20.3 (0.80)	4.8 (0.19)	2.0 (0.08)	3.8 (0.15)	4.0 (0.16)	0.7 (0.03)	0.0 (0.0)	1.8 (0.07)	3.9 (0.15)	9.2 (0.36)	84.5 (3.33)
Average precipitation days (≥ 1.0 mm)	2.3	2.3	2.6	1.1	0.6	0.2	0.4	0.2	0.0	0.4	0.5	1.2	11.8
Average relative humidity (%)	50	43	33	31	22	22	21	20	20	21	32	46	30
Mean monthly sunshine hours	244.5	238.8	254.4	282.4	325.6	331.2	317.9	315.8	309.6	317.9	291.5	256.5	3,486.1
Source 1: NOAA (sunshine 1961–1990)
Source 2: (extremes), Deutscher Wetterdienst (humidity 1952-1967)

== Education ==
Dalbandin city is the District Chagai main hub of government and private education institutions due to the headquarter of District Chagai. Dalbandin has a government boys degree college and a girls degree college. And many other government and private education institutions are recently open in the city.

== Transport ==
Dalbandin city has a small domestic airport located in the southwest of the city and Dalbandin railway station is located in the city centre. People in Dalbandin normally travel by buses to bigger cities like Quetta and Karachi.

== Sport ==
Dalbandin city has a Football Stadium located in the city centre. Football is a famous sport in the city.

== 2011 Earthquake ==
The 7.2 M_{w} Dalbandin earthquake shook a remote region of Balochistan on 19 January 2011. The dip-slip shock had a maximum Mercalli intensity of VI (Strong), caused moderate damage, and left three dead and several injured. Fortunately, the town was not too much damaged.

== 2016 US drone strike ==
Taliban leader Mullah Akhtar Mansour was killed in a convoy next to the town by a U.S. drone strike on 21 May 2016.

== Internet services ==
Internet services 3G & 4G of cellular networks remain very poor in the whole city.

== See also ==
- Dalbandin Airport
- Dalbandin railway station
- Dalbandin Rifles
- 2011 Dalbandin earthquake
- District Chagai
