= Zahedan railway station =

Railway station in Zahedan, Iran

Zahedan Railway Station ایستگاه راه آهن زاهدان
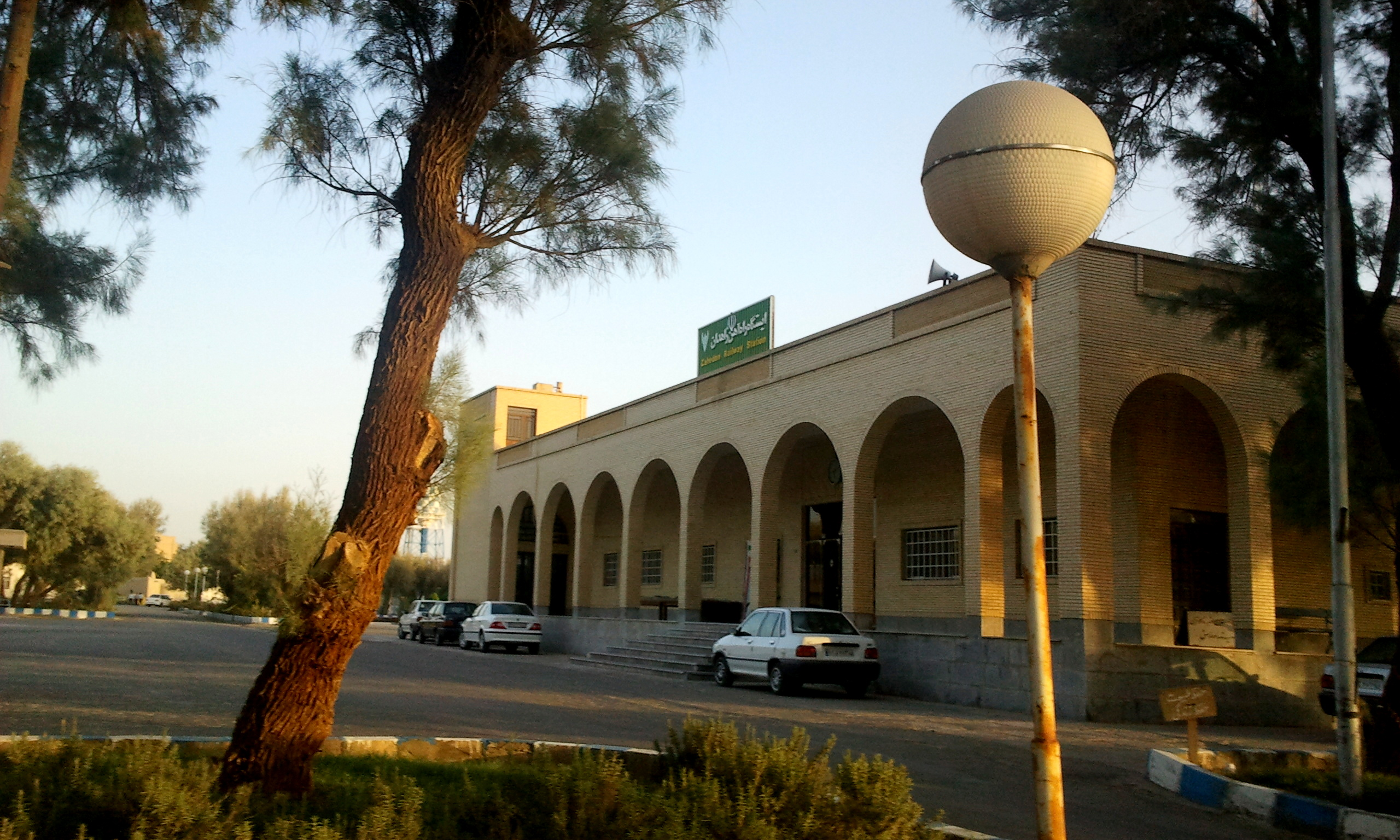
- Zahedan railway station

General information
- Location: Sistan and Baluchestan Province, Zahedan, Motahhari Boulevard, Iran
- Coordinates: 29.480009°N 60.874922°E
- Owner: Ministry of Railways
- Line: Quetta-Taftan Railway Line
- Platforms: 3
- Tracks: 6
- Connections: Quetta, Tehran

Construction
- Structure type: At Ground

Other information
- Status: Functional
- Station code: ZDN

Services
Preceding station	Pakistan Railways	Following station
Khan Muhammad Chah towards Quetta	Quetta–Taftan Line	Terminus
Location

Zahedan Railway Station (Persian: ایستگاه راه آهن زاهدان) is located in Zahedan, Iran. It serves as the terminus for the Quetta–Taftan Railway Line and Bam-Zahedan railway. It also serves as the break of gauge between Pakistan Railways 1,676 mm (5 ft 6 in) broad gauge and Islamic Republic of Iran Railways 1,435 mm (4 ft 8 1/2 in) standard gauge. It is one of the three stations in Iran which are served by Pakistan Railways.

== History ==
The Trans–Baluchistan Railway was constructed as part of a strategic military route between the British Raj (now Pakistan) and Qajar Iran. The first section from Quetta (Pakistan) to Nushki (Pakistan) branch line was opened on 15 November 1905. The railway construction west of Nushki towards Iran was named the Nushki Extension Railway and the railway line reached the Iranian town of Duzdap (now Zahedan) on 1 October 1922.

However, the military importance of the line had declined after World War I and in 1931, the 221 kilometer section between Nok Kundi and Duzdap (Zahedan) was closed down and the track removed to be used elsewhere. World War II however, renewed interest in the Quetta–Zahedan link with the British forces wanting to aid the Soviet forces by supplying material through Pahlavi Iran. The Quetta–Zahedan link was reopened on 20 April 1940. An interesting account of the Quetta-Zahedan line is available in an archived website.

Iranian Railways developed rapidly post WWII and part of this was an extension towards its borders with Turkey, Iraq, Russia (and Afghanistan) and eventually Pakistan which saw a rail route develop in stages from Tehran to the east, eventually reaching Zahedan. The 225 km from Kerman in central Iran to Bam was completed between 1999 and 2002 and the 546 km extension to Zahedan began in 2000.

The route of the extension was quite difficult to construct and avoided the circuitous road route (Route 84 Zahedan–Narmashir) around the north of the Zahedan mountain ranges, much of it above 1400m. Instead, the Bam–Zahedan extension railway used a much more direct route, heading for a narrow gorge through the mountains across wide outflow plains with seasonal braided channels. After a major viaduct crossing the seasonal outflow that terminates in the Lut Desert the railway starts climbing from a low point of 435m (Google Earth) with increasingly steep gradients and tunnels as it passes through the outflow gorge in the mountains. Beyond this it reaches the valley of the seasonal river valley from Zahedan mountains which required many viaducts across mostly dry rivers from side valleys. The land opens out after Shuru station (1375 m Google Earth) into a high level plain with shallow seasonal river valleys and the railway reaches a summit of 1796m (Google Earth) before dropping gently towards Zahedan (Google Earth 1385m).

The construction of the railway from Bam to Zahedan was completed in early 2009 connecting Tehran to the Pakistan border with an opening ceremony on 19 July 2009 with an international container service commencing operations on 14 August 2009 requiring trans-shipment between the broad gauge and standard gauge. The railway has 11 bridges, the largest bridge 400 metres long, and 20 tunnels totalling 5320 metres. The freight traffic was discontinued however after the initial trial trains and was only revived in 2015.

Iranian Railways have been trying to persuade Pakistan Railways to convert its route to Quetta to standard gauge, in order to facilitate the flow of international traffic to Europe. Pakistan responded in 2006 with a statement that it is to convert its network to standard gauge and would plan a link with the standard gauge system of China. A through passenger service is being considered to supplement the occasional Quetta–Zahedan service, formerly Pakistan–Iran 'Taftan Express'.

== Facilities ==
=== Platforms ===
There are three platforms with one mixed gauge edge platform next to the station building and an island platform reached by a subway which is only equipped with standard gauge tracks.

=== Operational facilities ===
The standard gauge tracks lead to a 28 m turntable (Google Earth) north of the station while the wide gauge tracks have a triangle south of the station to turn locomotives. A new orange coloured (Google Earth) depot building north of the station provides maintenance for the standard gauge diesel locos that use the Bam route. This supplements a small broad gauge shed at the south end of the station where the station's broad gauge shunter is maintained. A transfer shed is situated south of the level crossing but only appears to be served by the broad gauge tracks.

=== South Yard ===
Just south of Zahedan, on what may in future become the bypass line, is a large freight yard equipped with various loading platforms and sheds. At the east end of the yard is a balloon loop for turning locomotives arriving from the west without reversing. A long siding reaches out eastwards towards a possible future junction with a regauged Quetta-Zahedan line south of the station.

== Trains ==
Zahedan has a daily train at 14:50 to Tehran and a weekly service to Esfahan.

After a recent period of closure, partly due to the security situation, Pakistan was aiming to restart a fortnightly rail service from Quetta to Zahedan from September 2018. However the latest Pakistan Rail timetable shows no passenger service. On 1/3/19 Turkish Railway was invited to upgrade the Pakistan section between Quetta and Zahedan. This section of railway has a number of dips across seasonal river beds rather than bridges and can be washed out in very occasional rain storms.

== Nearest Airport ==
- Zahedan Airport

== See also ==
- Islamic Republic of Iran Railways
- List of railway stations in Iran
- List of railway stations in Pakistan
- Pakistan Railways
