= Killing of Akhtar Mansur =

2016 airstrike in Pakistan

Death of Akhtar Mansur
- Part of the War in Afghanistan and the drone strikes in Pakistan
Date	May 21, 2016
Location	N-40 National Highway in Pakistan near Ahmad Wal
Result	American victory: Successful operation; Death of Akhtar Mansur

Belligerents
United States	Taliban

Commanders and leaders
(United States) Barack Obama (United States) John Kerry	(Taliban) Akhtar Mansur †

Units involved
Unknown	Military of the Taliban

Strength
Reaper drones: 2 Hellfire missiles	Unknown

Casualties and losses
None	3 killed: Akhtar Mansur; Mansur's taxi driver; Unknown identity

On 21 May 2016, Akhtar Mansur, the second leader of the Taliban, was killed in a U.S. military drone strike on the N-40 National Highway in Pakistan near Ahmad Wal, not far from the Pakistan–Afghanistan border; Mansur had crossed earlier that day from Iran into Pakistan through the Taftan, Balochistan, border crossing, some 450 kilometres (280 mi) away from the spot where he was killed.

The following day, U.S. Secretary of State John Kerry announced that the United States had "conducted a precision airstrike that targeted Taliban leader Mullah Mansur in a remote area of the Afghanistan–Pakistan border" against Mansur that had likely killed him, and stated that Mansur "posed a continuing, imminent threat" to U.S. personnel and Afghans.

On 23 May 2016, U.S. President Barack Obama confirmed that Mansur had been killed in the American airstrike that he had sanctioned, and stated that Mansur had been planning attacks against U.S. targets in Kabul. Obama stated afterwards that he had hoped Mansur's death would lead to the Taliban joining a peace process. The death of Mansur was also later officially confirmed separately by the Afghan government and members of the Taliban.

== Incident ==
Mansur had crossed into Pakistan posing as a Pakistani citizen, using forged identity documents (a Pakistani passport and national ID card under the name "Muhammad Wali.") The false passport showed that Mansur had entered Iran on 28 March. Mansur and his taxi driver were both killed in the strike against the Toyota Corolla, which was struck by two Hellfire missiles launched by Reaper drones that had evaded Pakistani radar.

== Succession and impact ==
Mansur was succeeded as Taliban leader by Hibatullah Akhundzada.

Some U.S. officials had been divided over Mansur's intentions. Some believed that Mansur could have brought the Taliban to the negotiating table, potentially speeding up the reconciliation process; others, by contrast, "were highly skeptical of Mansour's commitment to talks," noting that Mansur had a long history of authorizing suicide attacks, including in the weeks before the drone strike (such as the April 2016 Kabul attack, which killed more than 60 people), and that even as Mansur was agreeing to secret direct peace negotiations, he had rejected international peace efforts. According to the International Institute for Counter-Terrorism, U.S. officials stated that Mullah Mansur's death was "unavoidable" due to the then Emir being unwilling to engage in peace talks.
