= Najibullah (militant leader) =

Afghan militant leader

- نجیب ﷲ
- Najibullah, date 2013
- Born: 1979 (age 46–47); Democratic Republic of Afghanistan
- Military career
- Allegiance: Taliban (1994–2012); Fidai Mahaz (2013–2026)
- Service years: 1994–2026
- Rank: Commander of Fidai Mahaz
- Conflicts: Second Afghan Civil War; Third Afghan Civil War; War in Afghanistan (2001–2021); U.S invasion of Afghanistan; Taliban insurgency; Taliban-ISIL conflict

Najibullah (Arabic: نجیب ﷲ; born c. 1979), often referred to as Mullah Najibullah or Hajji Najibullah, and also known by the pseudonym Omar Khitab (Arabic: عمر خطاب), is an Afghan militant leader who was the head of the Taliban-splinter group Fidai Mahaz in Afghanistan.

Najibullah was arrested in Ukraine, where he had traveled in October 2020 and subsequently extradited to the United States to face federal terrorism and hostage-taking charges.

Haji Najibullah, 50, of Afghanistan, also known as “Najibullah Naim,” also known as “Abu Tayeb,” also known as “Atiqullah,” also known as “Nesar Ahmad Mohammad,” was sentenced to 42 years in prison and five years of supervised release for terrorism charges based on his role in the hostage taking of an American journalist and two Afghan nationals in Afghanistan and Pakistan in 2008 and 2009, and his leadership of Taliban fighters who carried out attacks on U.S.

== Early life ==
Najibullah is believed to have been born around 1979 in Zabul Province.

== The Taliban and the Afghan Civil War ==
Najibullah joined the Taliban movement when he was 15 in 1994. He rose through the ranks of the Taliban, before becoming a subcommander under senior Taliban leader Mullah Dadullah in northern Afghanistan during fighting with the Northern Alliance. He acquired a reputation for launching daring attacks against Northern Alliance forces. In 1997 he was captured by the Northern Alliance, but bribed his way to freedom.

== War in Afghanistan ==
After the September 11 attacks Najibullah retreated back home to Zabul Province and re-organised his forces. In 2003, he led the first Taliban attack on Afghan forces in Zabul province. He was captured the following year in 2004 and held in prison for eight months before paying a hefty bribe to his jailers and escaping. Then in 2006 he was arrested again. He allegedly paid Afghan judges and intelligence officers $25,000 to arrange his release.

He gained a reputation for brutality by beheading prisoners and alleged spies. Dadullah appointed him commander of hundreds of suicide bombers and operational chief of insurgent forces inside Kabul. When special forces killed Dadullah during a 2007 raid, Najibullah immediately took command of most of his forces.

Najibullah organized a failed suicide attack in 2006 against former Afghan president Sibghatullah Mojaddedi and the successful kidnapping of one of Mojaddedi's deputies in the government's reconciliation program the following year. He is believed to have been involved in attacks on American and Afghan military convoys in Kabul and on U.S. outposts in nearby Wardak province. He was filmed by a French female journalist for France 24 in 2007 and 2008. He has claimed responsibility for the kidnapping of New York Times reporter David S. Rohde in November 2008.

He is believed to be operating out of Kandahar Province in Southern Afghanistan.

== Forming of Fidai Mahaz ==
In early 2012, Najibullah left the Taliban due to the opening of a political office in Qatar for negotiations with the Afghan government. He had been critical of the Taliban leadership and its negotiations with the government and Kabul amid peace-talks and a cease to the civil war in Afghanistan.

The shura wants to lose at the table what we have won with our blood on the battlefield.

— Najibullah

He went on to established the Sacrifice Front of the Islamic Movement of Afghanistan more commonly known as Fidai Mahaz.

He later claimed the responsibility of his group in the killing of the Swedish journalist, Nils Horner, 51. The radio reporter was shot down in a street of a heavily secured neighbourhood in the center of Kabul on 11 March 2014.

=== Post 2021 Taliban takeover ===
After the Taliban victory, Mullah Abdul Qayyum Zakir and Sadr Ibrahim, who were in charge of the Fidai Mahaz, took deputy positions in the Taliban's first government interim cabinet. It is unclear what happened to Najibullah and as to when and why Mullah Abdul Qayyum Zakir and Sadr Ibrahim became the leaders of Fidai Mahaz after him and as whether he died or was removed from office.

== Death of Mullah Omar ==
When the Taliban founder and former leader died, Najibullah revealed that due to Omar's kidney disease, he required medicine. According to Najibullah, Mullah Akhtar Mansour poisoned the medicine that he got from Dubai, damaging Omar's liver and causing him to grow weaker. When Omar summoned Mansour and other members of Omar's inner circle to hear his will, they discovered that Mansour was not to assume leadership of the Taliban. It was due to Mansour allegedly orchestrating "dishonourable deals". When Mansour pressed Omar to name him as his successor, Omar refused. Mansour then shot and killed Omar. Najibullah claimed Omar died at a southern Afghanistan hide-out in Zabul Province in the afternoon on April 23, 2013.
