= Fidai Mahaz =

Taliban splinter group

- فدائي محاذ; Sacrifice Front
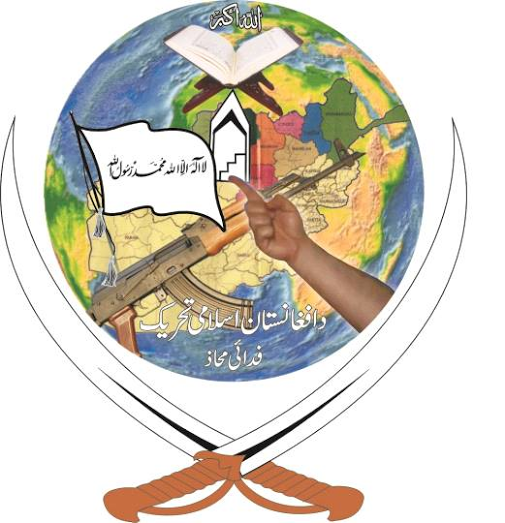
- Jihadist flag, which was used by the group multiple times Logo of Fidai Mahaz
- Leader: Mullah Najibullah (POW)
- Dates active: c. 2013–c. 2026
- Dissolved: 2026
- Split from: Taliban and Mullah Dadullah Front
- Allegiance: Islamic State (alleged by the Taliban, denied)
- Active regions: Afghanistan: Zabul Province; Helmand Province; Nangarhar Province
- Ideology: Ideology of ISIS (alleged by the Taliban, denied); Jihadism; Anti-Zionism; Anti-Shi'ism; Anti-Zoroastians sentiment; Anti-Iranian; Anti-Western sentiment
- Status: Inactive currently (No fighting reported since 2021)
- Size: 8,000 (Self-declared in 2013); 1,000-2,500+ (UN report in 2022)
- Website: http://www.allfida.org/en/

The Sacrifice Front, more commonly known as Fidai Mahaz (فدائي محاذ), was a Taliban splinter group and faction in the War in Afghanistan. It was led by Mullah Najibullah, also known as Omar Khitab, a former Taliban commander.

== History ==
=== Foundation ===
Fidai Mahaz was formed by ex-Taliban members and former members of the Mullah Dadullah Front. They had grown disillusioned with the leadership of the Taliban under Mullah Akhtar Mansour over peace talks with the Kabul government, opening a political office in Qatar and approaching Iran for support.

The group's leader, Mullah Najibullah, stated that the group's aims were simple: Cancelling the peace process between the insurgents and the Afghan government, and continuing to fight the government in Kabul and the NATO forces until they have left Afghanistan.

=== War in Afghanistan ===
Sources within Afghan intelligence and Taliban figures have stated that Fidai Mahaz was behind the failed suicide attack on the Indian Consulate in the eastern town of Jalalabad in early 2013.

On 11 March 2014, Fidai Mahaz claimed responsibility for the killing of British-Swedish reporter Nils Horner. The group's spokesman, Qari Hamza, accused him of being "a spy of MI6" in an English-language statement.

In 2020, the group condemned the peace agreement signed in Doha between U.S. representatives and Taliban leader Abdul Ghani Baradar.

After the Taliban victory, Mullah Abdul Qayyum Zakir and Sadr Ibrahim, who were allegedly in charge of the group, took deputy positions in the Taliban's first government interim cabinet.

== Death of Mullah Omar ==
Fidai Mahaz claimed Taliban founder and former leader Mullah Mohammed Omar did not die of natural causes but was instead assassinated in a coup led by Mullah Akhtar Mansour and Mullah Gul Agha. The Taliban commander Mullah Mansoor Dadullah, brother of former senior commander Mullah Dadullah, also claimed that Omar had been assassinated. Mullah Najibullah, claimed that due to Omar's kidney disease, he needed medicine. According to Najibullah, Mansour poisoned the medicine, damaging Omar's liver and causing him to grow weaker. When Omar summoned Mansour and other members of Omar's inner circle to hear his will, they discovered that Mansour was not to assume leadership of the Taliban. It was due to Mansour allegedly orchestrating "dishonourable deals". When Mansour pressed Omar to name him as his successor, Omar refused. Mansour then shot and killed Omar. Najibullah claimed Omar died at a southern Afghanistan hide-out in Zabul Province in the afternoon on 23 April 2013.
