= Kakar =

Pashtun tribe

Kakar کاکړ ۔ کاکڑ
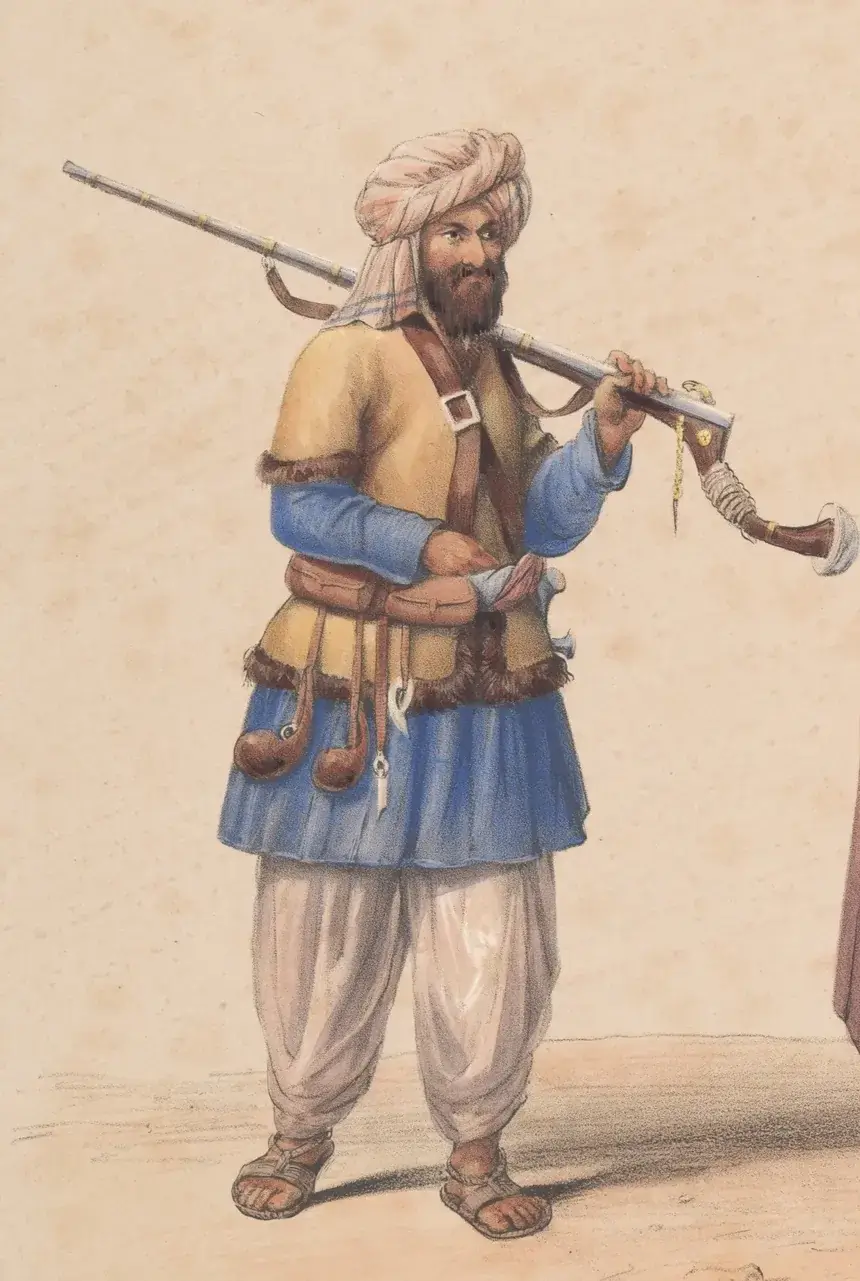
- a Kakar, circa 1840
- Ethnicity: Pashtun
- Location: Afghanistan, Iran (Razavi Khorasan), Pakistan (Balochistan)
- Parent tribe: Gharghasht
- Branches: Bazai, Jalalzai, Khudiadadzai Musakhel
- Language: Pashto, Arabic
- Religion: Islam

The Kakar (Pashto: کاکړ) is a Gharghashti Pashtun tribe, based in Afghanistan, parts of Iran, and northern Balochistan in Pakistan.

== Origins of the tribe ==
Kakars are descendants of Dani (or Daani) who was the son of Gharghasht. Gharghasht was the son of Qais Abdul Rashid, the founder of the Pashtuns who himself was the descendant of Afghana (or Avagana) the progenitor of modern-day Pashtuns.

In Herat, the Kakar are sometimes referred to as Kak. Historically, the tribe has been called Kakar but may have been referred to as Kak-kor (lit. family of Kak). The tomb of Kakar is in front of Herat central Jamia Masjid's gate. Some historians argue that Kakar was first buried in Kohistan, but Ghiyath al-Din Ghori brought the body to be re-buried in a mosque in the city of Herat.

== History ==
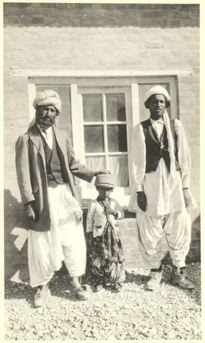
1929 - Kākaṛ Pashtuns pictured by Georg Morgenstierne

Until the fifteenth century, Kakars along with Tajiks, Baloch and Farsiwans mainly inhabited the Qandahar region and because of the predominant position of Abdali and Ghilzai Pashtuns in Qandahar region during and around 14th century, Tajiks, Hazaras, Kakars and Baloch lost their previous possessions and were forced to pay tax or revenue to warlords from either Abdali or Ghilzai tribal divisions. Eventually, some of these indigenous people assimilated and became part of dominant Pashtun confederacy, while others moved further west or to north Afghanistan.

Prior to the partition of British India, Hindu members of the Kakar tribe, known as Sheen Khalai, resided in the Qila Abdullah and Qila Saifullah, Quetta, Loralai and Maikhter regions of Baluchistan now in Pakistan.

The Kakar also took part in anti-colonial resistance against the British Indian Army fighting alongside neighbouring Baloch tribes.

After 1947, they migrated to Unniara, Rajasthan and other parts of independent India.

== Notable people ==
- Abdul Waheed Kakar, Chief of Army Staff Pakistan Army (1993–1996)
- Anwaar ul Haq Kakar, ex-Caretaker Prime Minister of Pakistan (2023–2024)
- Abdul Hai Habibi, Afghan historian
- Muhammad Hashim Kakar, Justice of the Supreme court of Pakistan
- Nawab Ayaz Jogezai, Pashtun Nawab and member of National Assembly
- Nashenas, Afghan Singer
- Faizullah Kakar, Afghan epidemiologist and public leader
- Kader Khan, Indian Actor
- Dadullah Afghan Taliban senior commander
- Mohammad Fazl Afghan Taliban Deputy Defense Minister
- Muhammad Sarwar Khan Kakar, was a Pakistani Senator
- Hafiz Sahar, Editor-in-Chief of national newspaper in Afghanistan (1970s), Fulbright Scholar, Professor of Journalism and Mass communication in Afghanistan and USA.
- Mohammad Rabbani, Prime Minister of Afghanistan under Taliban regime.
- Abdur Rab Nishtar, Muslim League member, Pakistani movement activist and politician.
- Safwat Ghayur, commandant of Pakistan's Frontier Constabulary
- Mullah Bakht alias Mansoor Dadullah, Senior Afghan Taliban Commander
- Owais Ahmed Ghani, Governor of Khyber Pakhtunkhwa (N-W.F.P.), Governor of Balochistan, Federal Minister, Provincial Minister (N-W.F.P), Pakistan Tehreek e Insaf political party founding member
- Palay Khan (Palay Shah), was from Khosthi Syed Tribe anti-Raj fighter
- Fariba Ahmadi Kakar, Afghan lady politician
- Rozi Khan Kakar, Pakistani Senator from Quetta
- Usman Kakar, Pakistani politician and Senator from Muslim Bagh
- Arfa Siddiq Kakar, Pakistani politician and Pashtun human rights activist from Muslim Bagh
