= Akhtar Mansur =

Supreme Leader of the Taliban from 2015 to 2016

Amir al-Mu'minin; Mullah; Akhtar Mansur
- اختر منصور
- Mansur in 1998

Supreme Leader of the Taliban
- In office 29 July 2015 – 21 May 2016 (Note: Acting: 23 April 2013 – 29 July 2015) (Note: Mullah Omar's death was concealed from the public and most of the Taliban. The same day news of Omar's death became public, Mansour was elected leader.)
- Deputy: First Deputy; Himself (2013–2015); Hibatullah Akhundzada (2015–2016); Second Deputy; Sirajuddin Haqqani (2015–2016)
- Preceded by: Mullah Omar
- Succeeded by: Hibatullah Akhundzada
Other positions held
First Deputy Leader of the Taliban
In office 24 March 2010 – 29 July 2015
| Supreme Leader | Mullah Omar; Himself (acting) |
| Preceded by | Abdul Ghani Baradar |
| Succeeded by | Hibatullah Akhundzada |
Second Deputy Leader of the Taliban
In office February 2007 – 24 March 2010 Serving with Abdul Ghani Baradar
| Supreme Leader | Mullah Omar |
| Preceded by | Obaidullah Akhund |
| Succeeded by | Sirajuddin Haqqani (Note: Position vacant between March 2010 and July 2015.) |
Member of the Leadership Council of Afghanistan
In office May 2002 – February 2007
Minister of Transport and Civil Aviation
In office 27 September 1996 – 13 November 2001
| Supreme Leader | Mullah Omar |
| Prime Minister | Mohammad Rabbani; Abdul Kabir (acting) |
| Succeeded by | Abdul Rahman |

Personal details
- Born: c. 1959 Maiwand District, Kandahar Province, Kingdom of Afghanistan
- Died: 21 May 2016 (aged 56–57) Ahmad Wal, Balochistan, Pakistan
- Cause of death: Drone strike
- Resting place: Afghanistan
- Spouse: Two wives
- Children: 7
- Education: Darul Uloom Haqqania

Military service
- Allegiance: Mujahideen; Islamic and National Revolution Movement of Afghanistan (1980's–1992); Hezb-i Islami Khalis (1980s–1992); Taliban (1995–2016)
- Years of service: 1985–1992; 1995–2016
- Rank: Supreme commander
- Battles/wars: Afghan conflict; Soviet–Afghan War; Afghan Civil War (1989–1992); Afghan Civil War (1992–1996); Afghan Civil War (1996–2001); War in Afghanistan (2001–2021)

Akhtar Mohammad Mansur (Note: Pashto: اختر محمد منصور, romanized: Ehter Mahmad Munsur) (c. 1959 – 21 May 2016) was an Afghan milita leader, political figure, and religious leader who served as the second supreme leader of the Taliban from 2015 until his killing in a US drone strike in 2016. A close aide of the Taliban's founder, Mullah Omar, he served as the group's second deputy leader from 2007 to 2010 and as first deputy leader from 2010 to 2015.

U.S. president Barack Obama stated that Mansur was killed because he was planning attacks on US targets in Kabul. Obama hoped Mansur's death would lead to the Taliban joining a peace process.

== Early and personal life ==
Akhtar Mohammad Mansur was born in c. 1959. According to the Taliban, he is thought to have been born either in a village named Kariz or another village named Band-i-Taimoor, both of which are situated within the Maiwand District of Kandahar Province in southern Afghanistan (in what was then the Kingdom of Afghanistan).

According to a biography released on a Taliban website, his date of birth was shown as 1347 in the solar Hijri calendar, which corresponds to 1968. This year is corroborated by S. Mehsud, of the C.T.C. West Point. Pakistani journalist Ahmed Rashid claimed that Mansur belonged to the Alizai tribe, but other sources claim that he was of the Ishaqzai tribe, in any case, both the Alizai and the Ishaqzai are of the Durrani line of Pashtuns. According to the Taliban, Mansoor was educated at a village mosque and joined primary school at about the age of seven.

Mansur is alleged to have owned a cell-phone company, among other investments, and is claimed to have been wealthy as a result of his profiting from the dealings of Ishaqzai drug dealers. According to Richard Spencer of The Daily Telegraph, Mansur performed his business operations via a residence located in Dubai.

An undamaged Pakistani passport in the name of "Wali Muhammad" was recovered near the burned-out car at the scene of the drone attack that killed him; the passport is believed to have belonged to Mansur.

== Soviet war and mujahideen era (1985–1992) ==
Sometime in 1985, Mansur joined the jihadi war against the Soviet invasion of Afghanistan, participating in the Mohammad Nabi Mohammadi group. During the same time, Mullah Omar was a commander of an organization within Mohammad Nabi Mohammadi. Mansur participated in the war against the Soviet military within Maiwand, Sang-e-Hessar, Zangawat and other parts of the city, and the Pashmul area of the Panjwai district, under the command of Mohammad Hassan Akhond, apparently commanded by him at least while fighting at the last location.

In 1987, Mansur was apparently injured, sustaining 13 separate wounds while stationed at Sanzary area of Panjwai district in Kandahar, according to the Taliban. Known as one of the prominent warriors, he joined the Maulvi Obaidullah Ishaqzai group later that year but Ishaqzai soon surrendered to Nur ul-Haq Ulumi, now the interior minister. Soon afterwards, he migrated to Quetta in Pakistan.

After the war, Mansur resumed his religious education in different seminaries and later shifted to Peshawar, Pakistan, where he joined Jamia Mohammadia at the Jalozai Refugee camp. From 1994 to 1995, Mansur studied at the Darul Uloom Haqqania madrasa, which is located within the Jalozai refugee camp for Afghans near Peshawar. He was a very popular student at the madrassa, according to Afghan journalist Sami Yousafzai, who met him during that time.

== First Taliban rule (1996–2001) ==
After the capture of Kandahar airport he was appointed as director general, or otherwise termed, security officer in charge, of the Kandahar airport, a role which encompassed both the air force and air-defence systems of Kandahar. After the taking of Kabul during 1996 he was made director of Ariana airlines, and additionally Minister of the Emirate for aviation and tourism, by Mullah Omar, within the Taliban's Islamic Emirate of Afghanistan, together with his overseeing the Emirates' air force and air-defence systems, from his additional appointment as head of these within the ministry of defence. Notably, while minister, Mansur organized 24-hour flight services within Afghanistan, thereby organizing the provision of facilities for Muslims to go to Mecca as Hajj via air-flight. During 1996, Mullah Omar appointed Farid Ahmed to station manager of Ariana airlines.

During 1997, when the Taliban tried unsuccessfully to capture the northern city of Mazar-e-Sharif, Mansur was captured by an Uzbek warlord. For two months he remained there as a prisoner of war, before Mohammed Omar negotiated his release in a prisoner swap.

During 1998, the Mullah visited Frankfurt, Germany, and Prague, Czech Republic, during a 25-day trip visit to the unofficial envoy to Europe at the time, Mullah Nek Muhammad:

He came to Germany to purchase airport equipment, parts for airliners and military choppers for the Taliban air force

— Mullah Nek Muhammad, as reported by S. Yousafzai

After the conclusion of the hijacking of Indian Airlines Flight 814, Mansur was reported, by Anand Arni, a former officer with the Indian organisation Research & Analysis Wing, as being seen embracing Maulana Masood Azhar, the then leader of Jaish-e-Mohammed.

In 2001, he surrendered to the Afghan President Hamid Karzai to ask for amnesty. He was forgiven after which he returned to his home district. However, American forces, refusing to believe he and other senior Taliban commanders had given up fighting, conducted a series of night raids to capture him after which he fled to Pakistan, where he helped to shape the Taliban as an insurgent organisation.

Mansur was appointed as shadow governor of Kandahar, from sometime after 2001, until May 2007.

In a previously secret state communication of the U.S. government in 2006, Akhtar Mansur was listed as the 23rd member of the Taliban (with the late Mohammed Omar as the first member).

== Deputy Leadership of the Taliban (2007–2015) ==
=== Second Deputy Leader (2007–2010) ===
==== Quetta Shura and Taliban insurgency ====
In February 2007, the council of the Taliban appointed Mansur second deputy leader to Mullah Omar, joining Abdul Ghani Baradar, who was the first deputy leader. The Indian Express reported Mansur was also appointed to the Taliban's Quetta Shura (council for political and military matters and affairs) sometime in the same year as his appointment as second deouty leader, while within Quetta.

=== First Deputy Leader (2010–2015) ===
In March 2010, Mansur replaced Abdul Ghani Baradar and became first deputy leader of the Taliban, thus became the second highest-ranking official in the group, after Mullah Omar. However, contradictory report states his appointment occurred during 2013 after Abdul Ghani Baradar was jailed. A source claims to know of Mansur having a "direct influence" over military units operating within Khost, Paktia and Paktika, at a time after his appointment to the Council of the Taliban.

=== Listed by the United Nations for sanctioning ===
In a communique published 29 November 2011, the Mullah was identified with the reference number TI.M.11.01. as an individual associated with the Taliban and accordingly was made pursuant to sanctions, as of 25 January 2001, and those sanctioned were to have any available assets frozen, to be banned from traveling and to be subject to an arms embargo.

=== 2013 – June 2015 ===
Wahid Muzhda is quoted as saying of Mansur:

in 2013 he convinced other Taliban leaders to open the group's political office in Qatar to initiate negotiations with the West.

A fact which is corroborated by an additional report, which states the office was in Doha, Qatar.

According to a 2014 report, Mansur, together with Abdul Qayum Zakir and Gul Agha Ishakzai, were involved in fighting over control of a major opium-producing area (land of Maiwand District) against a co-founder of the Taliban movement, Abdul Ghani Baradar.

An article published on 12 March 2015 said Mansur and Abdul Qayum Zakir, who were long-term rivals, had met together in order to find an agreement and at the meeting had slaughtered sheep for a feast. The article stated Mansur was in favour of initiating so-called talks with Afghani government officials at the time, but was unable to make any progress in his own direction due to opposition from Zakir to the opening of a dialogue with the Afghan government.

According to one report, dated 17 March 2015, Mansur was at that time deputy amir al-mu'minin, military leader and head of the shura of Quetta.

Mansur wrote a letter to Abu Bakr al-Baghdadi, on behalf of the Islamic Emirate of Afghanistan, released on 16 June 2015, to express his concerns of the potential for a negative influence of ISIS upon Afghan Talibans' progress, since ISIS activities might pose a risk of causing "multiplicity" within forces of the jihad of Afghanistan. The letter, appealing to the unity of "religious brotherhood", requests al-Baghdadi might extend "goodwill" to the Taliban, which "doesn't want to see interference in its affairs". The letter was written in Pashto and released within the Voice of Jihad site.

Additionally, the letter shows Mansur considered the late (Sheikhs) Abdullah Azzam and Osama bin Laden, the late Abu Musab al Zarqawi and Ibn al-Khattab, to be heroes. In addition the letter expresses recognition of the support to the Islamic Emirate of Afghanistan, of "famous religious scholars", of these he provides (Sheikh) Hamud bin Uqla al Shuaybi as an example.

== Leadership of the Taliban (2015–2016) ==
Akhtar Mansur was elected leader of the Taliban organisation on 29 July 2015. The results were announced on Thursday 30 July.

=== Internal dissent ===
Taliban splinter group Fidai Mahaz claimed Mohammed Omar was assassinated in a coup led by Akhtar Mansur and Gul Agha. Mansoor Dadullah, a Taliban commander and the brother of former senior commander Dadullah, also claimed that Omar had been assassinated. Mohammad Yaqoob, Omar's eldest son, denied that his father had been killed, insisting that he died of natural causes. A Taliban communique published 30 July 2015 said that Omar had died in hospital.

Mullah Mansur is said to have "closely kept the secret that Mullah Omar had been dead" despite the leaking of a report of Omar's death in 2013.

=== Dissension ===
Some Taliban members considered Mansur's selection as leader to be invalid because not all Taliban were involved in the decision. Other senior Taliban commanders and officials wanted Omar's son Yaqoob as leader. Yaqoob was said to have been supported by his father's younger brother Abdul Manan, and former Taliban military chief Abdul Qayyum Zakir. The head of the Talibans' political office in Qatar, Tayyab Agha, also opposed the selection of Mansur as leader. However, a statement allegedly from Zakir denied he had any conflict with Mansur. Yaqoob is known to have publicly rejected the appointment of Mansur.

=== Features of Mansur's leadership ===
Mansur announced one of his deputies to be Sirajuddin Haqqani.

Mansur is thought to have had dealings of some kind with the Pakistani Inter-Services Intelligence.

On 13 August 2015, al-Qaeda's media wing As-Sahab issued a pledge of allegiance from Ayman al-Zawahiri to Mansur.

Sometime in August, Mansur sent a delegation to meetings with officials of the Afghan government, which was subsequently "hailed as a breakthrough".

A Security Council report, dated to the immediate September after Mansur's inauguration, showed he, as the new leader, was unwilling to engage in negotiations for the purposes of assuring peace.

The Brookings Institution reported that Mansur referred to his own leadership as Commander of the faithful, a translation of Amir al-Mu'minin. A separate source states Mansur used this particular title to refer to his role as leader of jihad. Mansur was, according to RAND corporation, and elsewhere, leading a jihad (i.e. an insurgent force) limited to concerns orientated only to within Afghanistan, and not elsewhere.

==== Communications ====
According to a report published on 5 November 2015, Mansur stated his opinion that modern education was a "necessity".

Mansur released his first communication as leader of the Taliban on 1 August 2015 as part of a 30-minute (or 33-minute, according to Al Jazeera) video release:

... We should all work to preserve unity, division in our ranks will only please our enemies, and cause further problems for us ...Our goal and slogan is to implement sharia and an Islamic system, and our jihad will continue until this is done ...

Mansur stated his position with regards to peace talks; the suggestion of his being willing to engage in peace talks as "enemy propaganda".

The website of the Islamic Emirate of Afghanistan published a biography of Mansur when he became Emir.

== Death ==
On 21 May 2016, Mansur was killed in a U.S. military drone strike on the N-40 National Highway in Pakistan near Ahmad Wal, not far from the Pakistan–Afghanistan border; Mansur had crossed earlier that day from Iran into Pakistan through the Taftan, Balochistan border crossing, some 450 kilometres (280 mi) away from the spot where he was killed. Mansur was being driven to Quetta, after a long stay in Iran, reportedly to both visit family and seek medical treatment.

The CIA had learned of Mansour's location via electronic intercepts, and the movements of his vehicle were tracked using signals intelligence provided by the NSA. Mansur had crossed into Pakistan posing as a Pakistani citizen, using forged identity documents (a Pakistani passport and national ID card under the name "Muhammad Wali.") The false passport showed that Mansur had entered Iran on 28 March. Mansour and his taxi driver were both killed in the strike against the Toyota Corolla, which was struck by two Hellfire missiles launched by Reaper drones.

The following day, U.S. Secretary of State John Kerry announced that the United States had "conducted a precision airstrike that targeted Taliban leader Mullah Mansour in a remote area of the Afghanistan-Pakistan border" against Mansur that had likely killed him, and stated that Mansur "posed a continuing, imminent threat" to U.S. personnel and Afghans. Kerry said that the leaders of both Pakistan and Afghanistan were made aware of the airstrike but did not comment on the timing of the notifications, which he said included a telephone call from him to Pakistani prime minister Nawaz Sharif. The Pakistani government later said it was notified of the strike seven hours after it took place.

On 23 May 2016, U.S. president Barack Obama confirmed that Mansur had been killed in the American airstrike that he had sanctioned, and stated that Mansur had been planning attacks against U.S. targets in Kabul. Obama stated afterwards that he had hoped Mansur's death would lead to the Taliban joining a peace process. The death of Mansur was also later officially confirmed separately by the Afghan government and members of the Taliban.

The U.S. government agencies involved reportedly agreed that officials were to be vague about identifying the location of the strike, beyond saying it took place in the Afghanistan-Pakistan border region. The strike that killed Mansur was a rare instance of a U.S. drone strike in Balochistan; U.S. strikes in Pakistan were more generally limited to the Federally Administered Tribal Areas.

Two senior members of the Taliban said that Pakistani authorities had delivered Mansur's badly burned body to the Taliban for its burial in Quetta, Balochistan. Pakistani officials, however, denied handing over a body. Mansur's body was later handed over to his relatives in Afghanistan.

=== Succession and impact ===
Mansur was officially succeeded as Taliban leader by his first deputy Hibatullah Akhundzada four days later.

Some U.S. officials had been divided over Mansur's intentions. Some believed that Mansur could have brought the Taliban to the negotiating table, potentially speeding up the reconciliation process; others, by contrast, "were highly skeptical of Mansour's commitment to talks," noting that Mansur had a long history of authorizing suicide attacks, including in the weeks before the drone strike (such as the April 2016 Kabul attack, which killed more than 60 people), and that even as Mansur was agreeing to secret direct peace negotiations, he had rejected international peace efforts. According to the International Institute for Counter-Terrorism, U.S. officials stated that Mullah Mansur's death was "unavoidable" due to the then Emir being unwilling to engage in peace talks.

== Timeline ==
The following is a list of reported information:

- Born sometime during either 1960, 1963, 1965 or 1968.
- Joined war against Soviet invasion during 1985.
- Joined Maulvi Obaidullah Ishaqzai during 1987.
- Injured during battle during 1987.
- Student at Darul Uloom Haqqania madrassa 1994–1995.
- Made director of Ariana airlines during 1996.
- Sometime during 1996 appointed to Minister of Civil Aviation (including both domestic and military flights), Transportation, Tourism.
- Injured during battle May 1997.
- Visited Europe during 1998.
- Listed for sanctioning by the United Nations as of 25 January 2001.
- Known to be involved in activities identified as terrorist within the provinces of Khost, Paktia and Paktika, Afghanistan as of May 2007.
- Made Governor of Kandahar by the then powers of the Taliban, as of May 2007.
- Attendee of meeting (2007) to organize bombing campaign to kill Ahmad Wali Karzai and Hamid Karzai.
- Appointed to the Quetta Shura sometime during 2007.
- Deputy to Mullah Abdul Ghani Baradar in the Taliban Supreme Council as of 2009.
- Temporarily in charge of the Taliban Supreme Council from February 2011.
- Identified as involved within the trafficking of illegal drugs, principally through Gerd-e-Jangal (within Afghanistan); 2011.
- Public statement as leader of Taliban as of 30 July 2015.
- During August and September 2015, the Mullah had sent a request to Mullah Dadullah to leave Zabul, using the Taliban shadow governor for Zabul, and subsequently sent fighters against the non-allegiant Mullah Dadullah.

== Notes ==
Political offices
| Preceded by Obaidullah Akhund | – In exile – Second Deputy Leader of the Islamic Emirate of Afghanistan; 2007–2010 with Abdul Ghani Baradar; Served under: Mullah Omar | Vacant Title next held by Sirajuddin Haqqani (2015) |
| Preceded by Abdul Ghani Baradar | – In exile – First Deputy Leader of the Islamic Emirate of Afghanistan; 2010–2015; Served under: Mullah Omar | Succeeded by Hibatullah Akhundzada |
| Preceded by Mullah Omar | – In exile – Supreme Leader of the Islamic Emirate of Afghanistan; 2015–2016; Acting: 2013–2015 | Succeeded by Hibatullah Akhundzada |
