= Janikhel offensive =

2016 military action

- Part of the War in Afghanistan (2001–2021), Taliban insurgency, Operation Omari
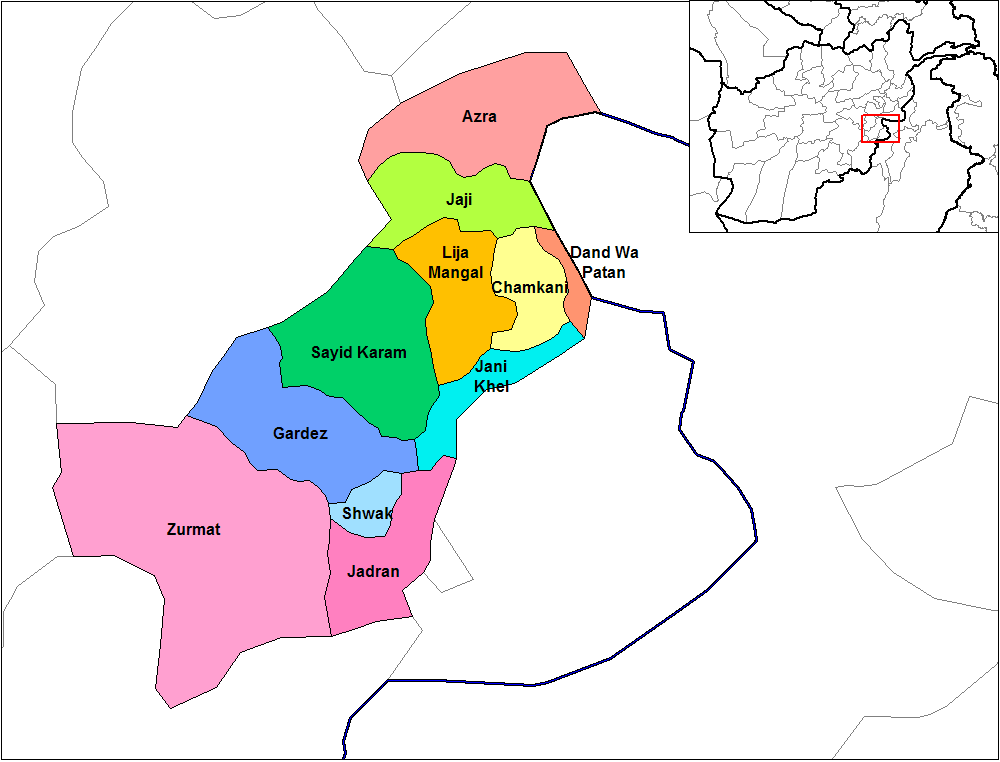
- Janikhel District (cyan) within the Paktia Province.
Date	10 August – 5 September 2016 (3 weeks and 5 days)
Location	Janikhel District, Paktia Province, Afghanistan
Result	Afghan government victory

Belligerents
Afghanistan: Afghan National Army; Afghan National Police; Local pro-government militia (surrendered); Supported by: Resolute Support Mission: United States	Taliban: Haqqani network; Supported by: Pakistan: ISI (government claim)

Commanders and leaders
(Islamic Republic of Afghanistan) Abdul Rahman Zurmati (Janikhel governor)	Taliban district chief of Janikhel †; Hafiz Rashid † (Pakistani Taliban commander)

Strength
Local garrison: 90–150 soldiers and policemen; c. 100 militiamen; Unknown number of soldiers during the counter-attack	1,200 (government claim)

Casualties and losses
27–30 soldiers and policemen killed, many wounded (government claim); 48 killed (Taliban claim)	130–320 killed (government claim)

The Janikhel offensive was launched by the Taliban and the Haqqani network in early August 2016 to conquer the Janikhel District within the contested Paktia Province from government forces. Due to the district's geographic location, it is of great strategic and tactical value to any force that controls it. After being besieged by insurgents for weeks and not receiving any outside help, the local government forces retreated from the district on 27 August. Even though the district was retaken by the government on 5 September, the fact that the district had been captured by the Taliban in the first place was widely considered a heavy blow for the government, which faced increasing insecurity and loss of territory since the ISAF retreat in 2014.

== Background ==
The Janikhel district, inhabited by c.120,000 people, is strategically significant due to its location and the Khost-Gardez highway that runs through it. The highway is of vital importance for the supply and stability of the region, and its capture by rebel forces could result in the collapse of several local districts, while allowing insurgents to use it to move weapons, money, supplies, and forces from the Pakistani tribal areas into Afghanistan. Furthermore, the Janikhel district is historically important for the Haqqani Network, which suffered one of its largest defeats there during the Battle for Hill 3234 of the Soviet–Afghan War. It has been concluded that "the destabilization and fall of Janikhel [could be] the first possible stage in Haqqani establishing a secure foothold in eastern Afghanistan — the prospect of which could make Kabul a far bloodier scene."

== The offensive ==
On 10 August, hundreds of Taliban and Haqqani network fighters began their offensive, reportedly supported by the Pakistani ISI, quickly closing in on the district center. At this point, the local governor Abdul Rahman Zurmati already said that his forces needed reinforcements or Janikhel would fall. TOLONews regarded the district "on the verge of collapse". No external aid came, however, causing a local pro-government militia to lay down arms in protest and reducing the defenders' strength to around 90–150 soldiers and policemen, while the number of attackers had reportedly increased to 1,200 fighters by end of the month. Vastly outnumbered, government forces attempted to halt the Taliban advances in the mountainous terrain, though by 22 August they were completely besieged in the district center. In an attempt to secure reinforcements or other support, Governor Zurmati complained to the provincial police chief, and even called President Ashraf Ghani's public phone line to no avail. On 27 August, the defenders' ammunition ran out, finally forcing them to retreat from the district. The New York Times considered the defense of Janikhel "chaotic [...], mustered by troops scrambling until the last minute, then forced to retreat after their requests for reinforcements are delayed or denied because government forces are stretched thin on several fronts." Overall, the district's fall was considered a heavy blow to the government. The government forces claimed that around 200 Taliban had been killed in course the district's fall, among them the notorious Pakistani commander Hafiz Rashid.

After taking control of the whole district, the Taliban went on to destroy the district governor's office building and the houses of government employees and local policemen. Meanwhile, the Paktia provincial government finally assembled reinforcements and launched a counter-attack, supported by U.S. airstrikes. An airstrike on 31 August reportedly killed 120 militants, including four commanders of the Haqqani network, though the Taliban spokesman denied the report as baseless, saying the air strikes had killed only eight people. Government forces eventually succeeded in retaking Janikhel on 5 September.
