= Mullah Dadullah Front =

Afghan Salafi jihadist group active since 2007

- ملا دادالله محاذ
- Jihadist flag
- Founder: Mansoor Dadullah †
- Dates active: 2007–2016
- Dissolved: 2016
- Split from: Taliban
- Allegiance: Taliban (2007-2015); Islamic State – Khorasan Province (2015-2016)
- Headquarters: Kabul, Afghanistan
- Ideology: Salafi Jihadism; Islamic Statism

The Mullah Dadullah Front (also known as the Dadullah Front, the Mullah Dadullah Lang Allegiance or the Mullah Dadullah Mahaz) was an insurgent group in Afghanistan that claimed responsibility for a series of bombings and assassinations centered in Kabul.

== Background ==
Mullah Dadullah Akhund was a Taliban military commander killed in 2007. According to Bill Roggio of the Long War Journal, Dadullah had joined the Taliban in 1994 but was held in disfavor by some in that organization for his brutality during the Afghan civil war. Following the American-led invasion of Afghanistan in 2001 Dadullah led Taliban forces in southern Afghanistan. U.S. Military officials stated that Dadullah made use of suicide bombings in the Taliban's fight against American, NATO and Afghan government forces, and embraced the radical ideology of al-Qaeda rejected by many other Taliban leaders. Dadullah was killed by British special forces in Helmand Province in 2007. The Dadullah Front, apparently named in his honor, began operating in Southern Afghanistan, including Kandahar, Helmand, and Uruzgan Provinces, under the leadership of Dadullah's younger brother, Mansoor Dadullah. The group's level of independence from the Taliban was unclear.

== Operations ==
U.S. Military and intelligence officials at one stage claimed that the Dadullah Front was led by Mullah Abdul Qayoum Zakir, also known as Abdullah Gulam Rasoul, a former Guantanamo Bay detainee who was released in 2007.

The Dadullah Front claimed responsibility for the 14 May 2012 assassination of Afghan High Peace Minister Mullah Arsala Rahmani, who was shot in traffic within Kabul. Spokesman Qari Hamza, speaking to The Express Tribune, stated that the Dadullah Front would "target and eliminate" all persons allowing "[non-Muslim] occupation of Afghanistan." Rahmani was the second Peace minister to be killed within the year, following the assassination of Burhanuddin Rabbani by a suicide bomber on 20 September 2011. The Dadullah Front also claimed responsibility for that assassination. Both Rahmani and Rabbani had been responsible for organizing ongoing peace talks between the Taliban and the Karzai's government in Afghanistan. American and Afghan officials have stated that the Dadullah Front was attempting to derail peace negotiations then underway with the Taliban.

Callers claiming to represent the group contacted several Afghan officials in May 2012, including Zabul Province representative Dawood Hasas, and threatened retaliation should they vote in favor of a "strategic partnership" negotiated between Hamid Karzai and U.S. President Barack Obama.

== Relations with the Taliban ==
Afghan intelligence officials described the Dadullah Front as affiliated with the Taliban. Taliban spokesmen denied any relationship with the Front, and claimed that the group was a creation of the National Directorate of Security.

Following the August 2015 announcement that Akhtar Mansour had succeeded the deceased Mullah Omar as leader of the Taliban, Mansoor Dadullah refused to support him, leading to months of clashes between their forces in Zabul Province, resulting in the killing of Mansoor Dadullah and many of his supporters in November 2015. In August 2016, the Dadullah Front announced Dadullah's nephew Mullah Emdadullah Mansoor as its new leader, and threatened to take revenge on the Taliban.

The group was linked to another Taliban splinter group, Fidai Mahaz, but the groups were believed to be separate.
