= Operation Omari =

2016 Taliban offensive against the Afghan government in Afghanistan

- Part of the War in Afghanistan (2001–2021), Taliban insurgency
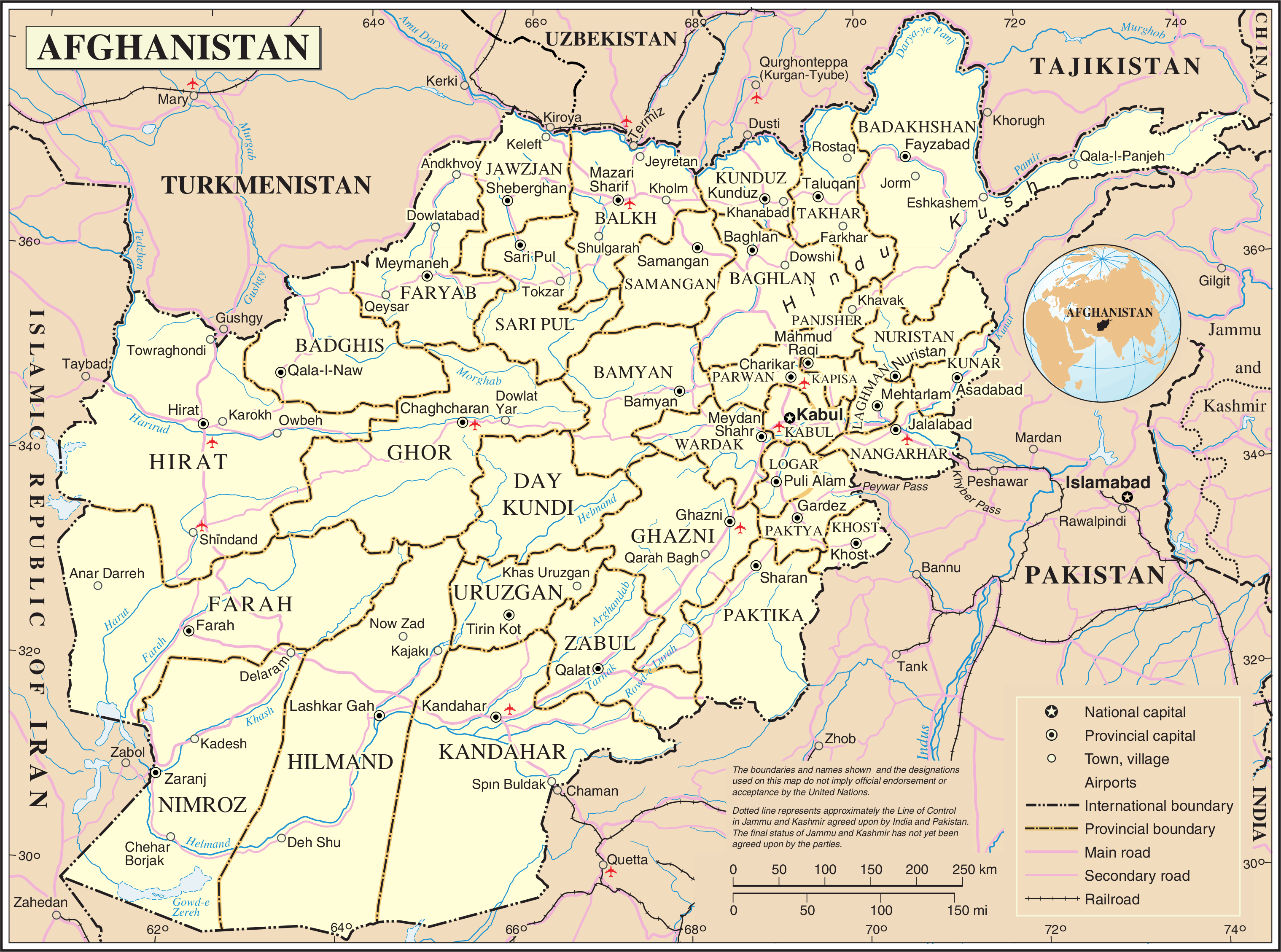
Date	12 April – 8 September 2016
Location	Afghanistan
Status	Afghan Government Victory; Taliban Propaganda Victory Taliban still control 40% of Afghanistan

Belligerents
Afghanistan	Taliban

Operation Omari, also called the Spring Offensive, was an offensive launched by the Taliban against the Afghan government in Afghanistan. Its start was announced on 12 April 2016. The Taliban made their yearly spring offensive announcement on April 12, 2016. They named the offensive in honor of the movement's late leader. The announcement of Operation Omari includes details on how the members of the group should present themselves in public. The aim of the Operation is considered ambitious and its focus is on clearing the remaining areas from enemy control and presence. Unlike offensive announcements from previous years this announcement contained details about specific targets that would be attacked during the operation. The targets were stated in general terms with reference only to "large scale attacks on enemy positions across the country, martyrdom-seeking and tactical attacks against enemy strongholds, and assassination of enemy commanders in urban centers."

== Etymology ==
The name of the operation was named after Taliban founder and leader Mohammed Omar.

== Timeline ==
=== 2016 ===
==== April ====
April 2016 Kabul attack

==== May ====
In may 2016, Taliban forces intensified their offensive in Helmand Province, with heavy fighting around Lashkar Gah and neighboring districts. On 23 May, Taliban leader Akhtar Mohammad Mansour was killed in a U.S. drone strike in Pakistan. Fighting intensified further toward the end of the month, with Taliban forces reaching the outskirts of Lashkar Gah.

==== June ====
In late June 2016, IS militants attacked police checkpoints in the Kot area of Nangarhar province, heavy fighting between Islamic State militants and government security forces has claimed dozens of lives in eastern Afghanistan, as many as 36 IS militants are reported to have been killed in the assaults, at least a dozen Afghan security forces and civilians have been killed, with another 18 wounded. The latest attacks indicate the group remains a potent threat to a government already battling an insurgency dominated by the rival Taliban.

==== July ====
July 2016 Kabul bombing,

==== August ====
1 August 2016 Kabul attack, the Jani Khel offensive begins on 10 August.

==== September ====
On 5 September, 80 Taliban militants were killed and 100 others injured after hundreds of fighters launched a coordinated offensive to capture Giro District, Ghazni Province. Five security personnel also had been killed and eight others injured during the operation. The Jani Khel offensive ends in an Afghan government victory; the September 2016 Kabul bombing takes place.

Between 7–11 September, Battle of Tarinkot (2016) takes place, resulting in an Afghan government victory.

On 8 September, 79 insurgents had been killed in Tarin Kot, Urozgan Province. Taliban said they broke into Tarin Kot's prison, but Samim rejected the claim and said many of the inmates had been transferred to the airport.

== See also ==
- April 2016 Kabul attack
