= Bazai =

Kakari Pashtun tribe

Shamozai Bazai (Pashto: بازای ) is a Pashtun tribe settled in Afghanistan and Pakistan. The Bazai Tribe is the sub-clan of Kakar tribe living in the western and southern region of Quetta District, Pishin, Ziarat and Sibi districts of Balochistan. The tribe is mainly settled in the mountainous regions, including the Maslagh, Zarghoon, Takatoo mountains of Quetta.
