= Ahmad Wal =

Ahmad Wal احمد وال
- Town
- Location within Balochistan, Pakistan Location within Pakistan
- Coordinates: 29°25′N 65°56′E
- Country: Pakistan
- Province: Balochistan
- District: Nushki District

Ahmad Wal (Urdu: احمد وال, romanized: Aḥmad Wāl) is a town in the Pakistani province of Balochistan about 20 miles from the Afghan border. Ahmad Wal railway station is on the Quetta–Taftan Line.

Taliban leader Akhtar Mansur was killed in a convoy southwest of the town by a U.S. drone strike on 21 May 2016.
