= Mansoor Dadullah =

Former senior military commander of the Taliban

- Mullah Mansoor during a Taliban graduation ceremony.
- Born: c. 1972; Arghandab, Kingdom of Afghanistan
- Died: 11 November 2015 (aged 42–43); Zabul Province, Afghanistan
- Military career
- Allegiance: (Afghanistan) Taliban (Afghanistan) Taliban separatists
- Service years: ????–2008 (Taliban); 2008–2015 (Taliban separatists)
- Rank: Deputy Emir of Taliban (High Council of Afghanistan Islamic Emirate)
- Conflicts: Afghan Civil War; War in Afghanistan (2001–present); Taliban insurgency Waziristan War; War on terrorism

Mullah Mansoor Dadullah (1972 – 11 November 2015) was the Taliban militant commander Mullah Dadullah's younger half-brother who succeeded him as a senior military commander of the Taliban in southern Afghanistan. He came from the Arghandab district of Kandahar province, and belonged to the Kakar Pashtun tribe.

== Militant activity ==
He appeared in a video which showed the "graduation ceremony" of would-be suicide bombers. In 2007, he was thought to be approximately 30 years old. During the 1990s, Mansoor Dadullah served as his brother's assistant during the Taliban's fight against the Afghan Northern Alliance. In November 2015, he was named as the Deputy Emir for the Taliban splinter faction, the High Council of the Afghanistan Islamic Emirate.

In March 2007, Mansoor Dadullah was serving a prison sentence in Kabul when he was released along with several other Taliban prisoners in exchange for Italian journalist Daniele Mastrogiacomo. At the time he was not considered to be of an important member of the Taliban movement.

After his brother was killed on May 12, 2007, a Taliban spokesman announced that Mansoor Dadullah would be taking his place as military commander of the Taliban insurgency in Southern Afghanistan. His appointment is not thought to be the result of any particular ability, but simply due to his kinship with Dadullah. Taliban leader Mullah Omar, who had resented Dadullah's brutality, was said to have opposed Mansoor Dadullah's appointment. He did, however, receive support from Al-Qaeda, who wished him to employ the tactics of Abu Musab al-Zarqawi in Afghanistan.

In June 2007, Mansoor Dadullah said: "Sheikh Osama Bin Laden is alive and active. He’s carrying out his duties. The latest proof that he is alive is that he sent me a letter of condolences after the martyrdom of my brother. He advised me to follow my brother’s path." On December 29, 2007, Mansoor Dadullah was removed from his post as military commander by Mullah Omar due to insubordination. On February 11, 2008, Dadullah was seriously wounded and captured by Pakistani security forces in a crackdown on Taliban in Gawal Ismailzai area.

== Release ==
Dadullah, alongside six other prisoners, was released by Pakistan on September 7, 2013, on the request of Afghan government for peace talks. After his release, Dadullah returned to Afghanistan to reorganise his brother's followers in a renewed Mullah Dadullah Front. Following the August 2015 announcement that Akhtar Mansour had succeeded the deceased Mullah Omar as leader of the Taliban, Dadullah refused to pledge allegiance to him, instead setting up a base with supporters in his native Zabul Province. Clashes followed between the forces loyal to Dadullah and Mansour.

In early September, Afghan media sources had announced that Dadullah was said to have joined the Afghanistan branch of the Islamic State group, following disputes over the appointment of Akhtar Mansour as leader of the Taliban. The announcement came from an Islamic State supporter in Afghanistan who further stated that 230 IS fighters were deployed to Zabul province from Farah province to aid Dadullah's forces against 2,100 Taliban militants sent by Mansour. According to the district governor of Arghandab in Zabul Province, Haji Momand Nasratyar, Dadullah's fighters are sympathetic to the Islamic State. However, other Afghan sources state that Dadullah denied joining the Islamic State in Afghanistan and was still loyal to the Taliban. He reportedly said "We are with the emirate and will (always) be." Dadullah was opposed to the Taliban leadership, calling Akhtar Mansour a "forger".

== Death ==
Dadullah was killed in November 2015 in clashes between his forces and those loyal to Taliban leader Mansour in the Khak-e-Afghan District of Zabul. The claims of his death were supported by local tribal elders, government officials and Taliban commanders, however his spokesman, Mullah Naim Niazi, said that Dadullah had only been wounded. Despite this denial, his faction officially confirmed his death on August 15, 2016, and named his nephew Mullah Emdadullah Mansoor as his replacement. Mansoor vowed revenge for his uncle's death.
