= Khudiadadzai =

Pashtun tribe

The Khudiadadzai (Pashto: خدادادزی) or Khoidadzai are a Pashtun tribe in Afghanistan and Pakistan. Most Khoidadzai are located in the Killa Saifullah District of Balochistan Province.

The Merdadzai tribe are related to the Khoidadzai but now most of them live in Lorlai district. Sub tribes of the Khoidadzai include Adniaazai, Bigzai, Janbigzai, Shailzai, Haleemzai, Marsenzai, and Mirabzai, Allozai, Merdadzai, and Paizai.

Most of the Khoidadzai tribe lives in Qilla Saifullah district.
