= Faizullah Kakar =

Afghan epidemiologist and public leader

Dr. Faizullah Kakar, PhD (Retired) فيض الله كاكر

Chief of Staff
- In office 2019 – 30 March 2020
- Preceded by: Abdul Salam Rahimi
- Succeeded by: Mohammad Shakir Kargar

Afghan Ambassador to Qatar
- In office 2016–2019

Minister Adviser to the President for Health and Education
- In office 2009–2016
- Preceded by: Dr. Najibullah Mojadidi

Deputy Minister of Public Health
- In office 2005–2009
- Preceded by: Dr. Ferozuddin Feroz
- Succeeded by: Dr. Ahmad Jan Naeem

Chancellor of Islamic University of Afghanistan
- In office 1992–1996

Personal details
- Born: Faizullah Kakar; December 24, 1950 (age 75) Gurziwan, Faryab, Afghanistan
- Education: University of Washington; Indiana University School of Medicine; Earlham College

Faizullah Kakar (Pashto: فيض الله كاكر, Persian: فيض الله كاكر, born 24 December 1950) is a retired Afghan epidemiologist. He retired from civil service on 30 March 2020. He previously served as the chief of staff to President Ashraf Ghani, the Afghan ambassador to Qatar, the adviser to president for health and education, and the deputy minister of public health for the Islamic Republic of Afghanistan. Kakar also previously served as the Presidential National Focal Point for Polio Eradication for Afghanistan, as part of the Bill and Melinda Gates Foundation effort to eradicate polio. Kakar has written and spoken internationally about numerous challenges faced in Afghanistan, including infectious disease epidemics, maternal mortality and the dangers of herbicides used to eradicate poppy.

== Education ==
Kakar attended secondary school at Lycee Habibia in Kabul, Afghanistan. In 1975, Kakar graduated with a bachelor's degree in biology from Earlham College, Richmond, Indiana. In 1977, Kakar received a master's degree in Toxicology from Indiana University School of Medicine, Indianapolis, Indiana. In 1982, Kakar completed his doctoral degree (PhD) in Epidemiology from the University of Washington, Seattle, Washington. From 1981 to 1988, Kakar also served on the board of the Islamic School of Seattle, Washington.

== Career ==
At the University of Washington, from 1984 to 1986, Kakar worked as a clinical assistant professor in the Department of Epidemiology. In 1986, he was hired as a staff scientist at Cancer Control Research Unit of the Fred Hutchinson Cancer Research Center in Seattle, Washington.

In 1988, he moved to Peshawar, Pakistan where he founded the Research and Advisory Council of Afghanistan (RACA). He served first as general chief of the Division of Preventive Medicine of the Ministry of Public Health, Interim Islamic Government of Afghanistan. In 1990, Kakar served as dean for the College of Medicine, then vice-chancellor before serving as chancellor of Islamic University of Afghanistan (IUA) in Peshawar, Pakistan, until 1996. From 1993 to 1995, Kakar also served as the deputy minister of public health for the Islamic Government of Afghanistan in Kabul, Afghanistan.

In 1997, Kakar moved to Islamabad, Pakistan, where he was selected by United Nations as the medical officer and epidemiologist for World Health Organization (WHO). Kakar was first to develop and coin the term "Disease Early Warning System" (DEWS) in Pakistan, which is a surveillance system recognized now throughout the world and being copied in many countries. Kakar worked for the WHO for 7 years.

In 2005, Kakar was again tapped as deputy minister for the Ministry of Public Health by the Government of Islamic Republic of Afghanistan in Kabul, where he served for 5 years. Kakar opposed mass spraying of fields with herbicide glyphosate to eradicate poppy, which was later proven to be carcinogenic in humans.

In 2009, he was promoted to minister adviser to the president on health and education affairs. In 2012, he was also assigned to be the presidential focal point for polio eradication, a position with global support as Afghanistan remains one of only three countries in the world with endemic polio transmission.

In 2016, Kakar was appointed as the Afghan ambassador to Doha, Qatar where he worked closely to support efforts for peace in Afghanistan.

== Awards ==
1. Award from the Clinical Nutrition research Unit of University of Washington to investigate the interaction between Selenium and Omega-3 fatty acids in relation to breast cancer, 1986.
2. Award from the United States National Cancer Institute to investigate whether carnitine can serve as a biochemical marker of dietary fat intake, 1988.
3. Award from the World Health Organization (WHO) to test a method of Vital Statistics Collection in Afghanistan 1990.
4. Award from the United Nations Children's Fund (UNICEF) to conduct surveys on the indicators of child mortality in Afghanistan, 1994.

== Publications ==
1. Faizullah Kakar. Practical Recommendations for Better Health (Farsi). 132 pp. April 2014. AAZEM Publications, Kabul.
2. Anbrasi Edward, Binay Kumar, Faizullah Kakar, Ahmad Shah Salehi, Gilbert Burnham, David H. Peters. Configuring Balanced Scorecards for Measuring Health System Performance: Evidence from 5 Years' Evaluation in Afghanistan. PLoS Medicine 2011. July; 8 (7): e1001066. Epub 2011 July 26.
3. Leslie T, Whitehouse CA, Yingst S, Baldwin C, Kakar F, Mofleh J, Hami AS, Mustafa L, Omar F, Ayazi E, Rossi C, Noormal B, Ziar N, Kakar R. Outbreak of gastroenteritis caused by Yersinia pestis in Afghanistan. Epidemiol Infect. 2011 May;139 (5): pages 728-35.
4. Faizullah Kakar, Zarif Akbarian, Toby Leslie, Mir Lais Mustafa, John Watson, Hans P. van Egmond, Mohammad Fahim Omar, and Jawad Mofleh. An Outbreak of Hepatic Veno-Occlusive Disease in Western Afghanistan Associated with Exposure to Wheat Flour Contaminated with Pyrrolizidine Alkaloids. Journal of Toxicology 2010. 28; 2010:313280. Epub 2010 June 28.
5. Tharani Kandasamy, Richard J. Guidotti, Ana P. Betrán, Jennifer Harris-Requejo, Farima Hakimi, Paul F. Van Look, F. Kakar, Cesarean delivery surveillance system at a maternity hospital in Kabul, Afghanistan, International Journal of Gynecology and Obstetrics 104: pages 14–17 (2009).
6. Guidotti, Richard J., Kandasamy, Tharani, Betrán, Ana Pilar, Merialdi, Mario, Hakimi, Farima, Van Look, Paul and Kakar, Faizullah. Monitoring perinatal outcomes in hospitals in Kabul, Afghanistan: The first step of a quality assurance process. The Journal of Maternal-Fetal & Neonatal Medicine, 2009. April; 22 (4): pages 285-92.
7. Faizullah Kakar, Abdul Hamid Ahmadzai, Najibullah Habib, Asadullah Taqdeer, Frederick Hartmann. A successful response to an outbreak of cholera in Afghanistan. Tropical Doctor, 2008. January; 38 (1): pages 17–20.
8. David H Peters, Ayan Ahmed Noor, Lakhwinder P singh, Faizullah Kakar, Peter M Hansen, Gilbert Burnham. A balanced scorecard for health services in Afghanistan. Bull World Health Org, 2007. February; 85 (2): pages 146–51.
9. Faizullah Kakar. 2005. Infectious diseases during the Afghan War IN Surviving Crisis: How systems and communities cope with instability, insecurity and infection. Workshop Proceedings 3–7 April 2002, The International Conference Center, Manila Philippines. Eds Pilar Ramos-Jimenez, Johannes Sommerfeld, Anthony Zwi. Manila: SDRC, CLA, De La Salle University.
10. Athar Saeed Dil, Faizullah Kakar, Muhammad Najeeb Durrani, Jaleel Kamran, Zafar Toor. Disease Surveillance and Control, Jointly Published by Epidemic Investigation Cell of National Institute of Health, Ministry of Health, Govt of Pakistan, WHO, and Global Infectious Disease Surveillance and Alert System (GIDSAS) of Johns Hopkins University United States Volume 4: 1, January - March 2004.
11. Ghazala Ashfaq, Faizullah Kakar, Maqbool Ahmed. Association of Tubal Ligation or Abdominal Surgery with other Gynecological Illness. Pakistan J Med Res. October – December 2005; 44(4): 152–5, 2005.
12. Ghazala Ashfaq, Faizullah Kakar, Maqbool Ahmed. Female Sterilization and its effects on women health. Pakistan J Med. Res. October – December 2003; 42 (4), 2003.
13. Altaf Hussain Bosan, Hamayun Asghar, Athar Saeed Dil, Faizullah Kakar, Irtaza Ahmad, Agha Sadarruddin. Nomad index case responsible for Crimean Congo Haemorrhagic Fever (CCHF) outbreak in Pishin. Pakistan J. Med. Res. October – December 2003; 42(4): 200–1, 2003.
14. Altaf Hussain Bosan, Hamayun Asghar, Athar Saeed Dill, Faizullah Kakar, Zafar Toor, Arshad Altaf, Arif Sarwari, Amna Rehana Siddiqui. Crimean Congo hemorrhagic fever (CCHF) outbreak in Karachi. Pakistan J. Med. Res. January – March 2002; 41(1): pages 36–8.
15. Agha Mahboob, Raza Malik, Qais Mahmood Sikandar, Zahid Ishaq, Faizullah Kakar. Private practitioner survey in Pakistan regarding their knowledge, attitude and practice of diseases reporting. Pakistan J. Med. Res. January – March 2000; 39(1): 26–9; 42(4): 200–1, 2003.
16. Altaf Hussain Bosan, Amanullah, Athar Saeed Dil, Faizullah Kakar, Agha Sadaruddin. The efficacy of intralesional treatment of Cutaneous Lieshmaniasis with Glucantime. Pakistan J. Med. Res. Volume 41, Number 2, 2002.
17. Altaf Hussain Bosan, Athar Saeed Dil, Faizullah Kakar, Sohail Zaidi, Agha Sadaruddin, Fayaz Ahmad. Measles mortality among Afghan refugee children. Pakistan J. Med. Res. Volume 41, Number 3, 2002
18. Altaf Hussain Bosan, Hamayun Asghar, Athar Saeed Dil, Faizullah Kakar, Zafar Toor Arshad Altaf, Arif Sarwari, Aman Rehana Siddique. Crimean Congo Haemorrhagic Fever outbreak in Karachi. Pakistan J Med. Res. Volume 41 Number 1. pages 36–38. 2002.
19. Aga MA, Sikander QM, Kakar F, Ishaq Z. Severe gastroenteritis outbreak in Rawalpindi. Pakistan J Med Res 2000; 39: pages 127-9
20. Kakar, F, Bassani F, Romer, CJ, Gunn, SWA. The Consequence of Land Mines on Public Health. Prehospital and Disaster Medicine. 11(1):2 2-10-1996
21. Kakar F, Kakar SR. Indicators of Child Morbidity and Mortality in Three Afghan Provinces. UNICEF, 1996. (41 pp)
22. Kakar F, Refreshing Your Wudhu is Healthy, Prolonging it is Harmful (in English & Dari) 21 pages. Institute of Public Health of Afghanistan, May, 1995.
23. Kakar F. Tea and Your Health (Dari). Peshawar: RACA. 1992. (32 pp) (available at ACKU Library)
24. Kakar F, Kakar SR. A new method of vital statistics collection in Afghanistan. Final Report to WHO on Pilot Project 1990. ALSO summarized in: A new method of vital statistics collection in Afghanistan. Proc. of RACA, August 4–6, 1991.
25. Kakar F, Hursting S, Henderson MM, Thornquist M. Dietary sugar and breast cancer mortality: Epidemiologic evidence. Clin Nutr 9(2): pages 68–71, 1990.
26. Kakar F, Thornquist M, Henderson MM, Klein R, et al. The effect of dietary sugar and dietary antioxidants on mammary tumor growth, lethality in BALB/c mice. Clin Nutr 9(2): pages 62–7, 1990.
27. Prentic RL, Kakar F, Hursting S, et al. Aspects of the rationale for the Women's Health Trial. J Natl Cancer Inst 80(11): pages 802-814, 1988.
28. Kakar F, Weiss N, Strite S. Non-contraceptive estrogen use and the risk of gallstone disease in women, Am J Public Health 78(5): pages 564–566, 1988.
29. Kakar F, Weiss N, Strite S. Thiazide use and risk of cholescystectomy in women Am J Epidemiol 124 (3): pages 428–433, 1986.
30. Kakar F, Henderson MM. Potential toxic side effects of folic acid. J Natl Cancer Inst 74:1, 1985.
31. Kakar F, Henderson MM. Diet and breast cancer. Clinical Nutrition 4(4): pages 119–30, 1985.
32. Faizullah Kakar. Risk factors for the occurrence of gallstone disease in women: a case-control study. PhD Dissertation. University of Washington 169. 1982.
33. Faizullah Kakar. A proposed mechanism of gentamicin renal toxicity. Thesis for MSc. Dept of Toxicology. Indiana University. 1977.

== Quote from book "Directorate S" ==
Excerpt from book "Directorate S" by Steve Coll

Dr. Faizullah Kakar, Afghanistan's deputy minister of public health, was the member of Karzai’s cabinet best qualified to evaluate the risks that might be posed to the Afghan people by aerial spraying. He had grown up in Kabul but earned a bachelor’s degree in biology from Earlham College in Indiana, a master's degree in toxicology from Indiana University, and a doctoral degree in epidemiology from the University of Washington. He had later worked for the World Health Organization in Pakistan. Kakar understood that glyphosate was widely used by American gardeners and farmers, who poured about one hundred million pounds of the stuff on their lawns and fields every year. The Environmental Protection Agency judged that glyphosate had "low toxicity" for humans, "slight toxicity" for birds, and was harmless to fish and bees. Apart from requiring a warning label, the E.P.A. did not restrict the chemical giant Monsanto from manufacturing or selling Roundup to Americans. Yet Kakar seriously doubted that it made sense to douse Afghan fields with the stuff. "You are telling us about how safe it is," he told Doug Wankel, the D.E.A. official in the Kabul embassy. "Remember D.D.T.?" He was referring to dichloro-diphenyl-trichloroethane, a synthetic insecticide developed in the 1940s. Initially popular and believed to be safe, D.D.T. turned out to be highly persistent in the environment and was ultimately classified by the E.P.A. as a probable human carcinogen. Kakar pointed out that Afghanistan had "a much more agricultural economy" than the United States, that runoff from fields went straight to local water supplies, and that many Afghans were "totally dependent" on farming. The country could not afford a massive spraying campaign based on current scientific assessments, only to discover later that glyphosate was not as safe as advertised. Kakar propounded his views before Karzai and the full Afghan cabinet. He said that while the Americans "used thousands of pounds of the same spray safely in California," the United States did much better at protecting its water sources, whereas Afghans "drink from open watercourses."

"This is the most popular chemical in the world," Bill Wood pointed out. Yet Wood and other advocates for spraying underestimated the asymmetries of power in these arguments with Afghans. Most Afghan decision makers (and for that matter, many Colombians) were not in a position to independently judge the longterm public health risks of glyphosate. And why should they accept E.P.A. judgments as gospel, given America’s own history of regulatory failures involving chemicals and public health? Amrullah Saleh and other cabinet ministers objected to the spraying plan on the grounds that “Taliban propaganda would profit greatly from any spraying.” Karzai’s instinctive sense was that if farmers and itinerant poppy pickers in Helmand and Kandahar looked up and saw American helicopters thundering over the horizon as dusters poured chemicals onto their fields, they would recall the atrocities of Soviet aerial warfare and blame Hamid Karzai. Gradually during 2007, while remaining cautious about offending President Bush, but with the unified support of his cabinet, Karzai made his position clear to the Americans: He opposed aerial spraying. He also opposed any role for the U.S. military in fighting drug production.
