= Janikhel District, Paktia =

District in Afghanistan

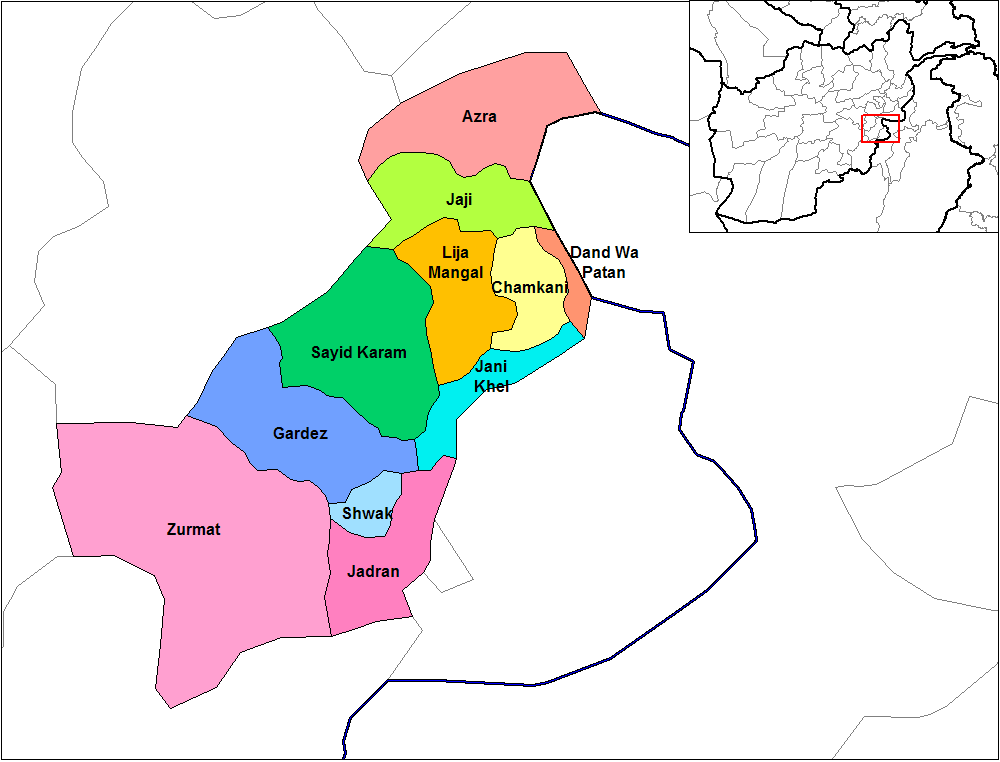
Districts of Paktia Province

Janikhel (Pashto: جاني‌خېل ولسوالۍ) is a district in Paktia Province, Afghanistan. It is on the border with Khost Province, and is mostly inhabited by the Mangal tribes of Pashtuns.

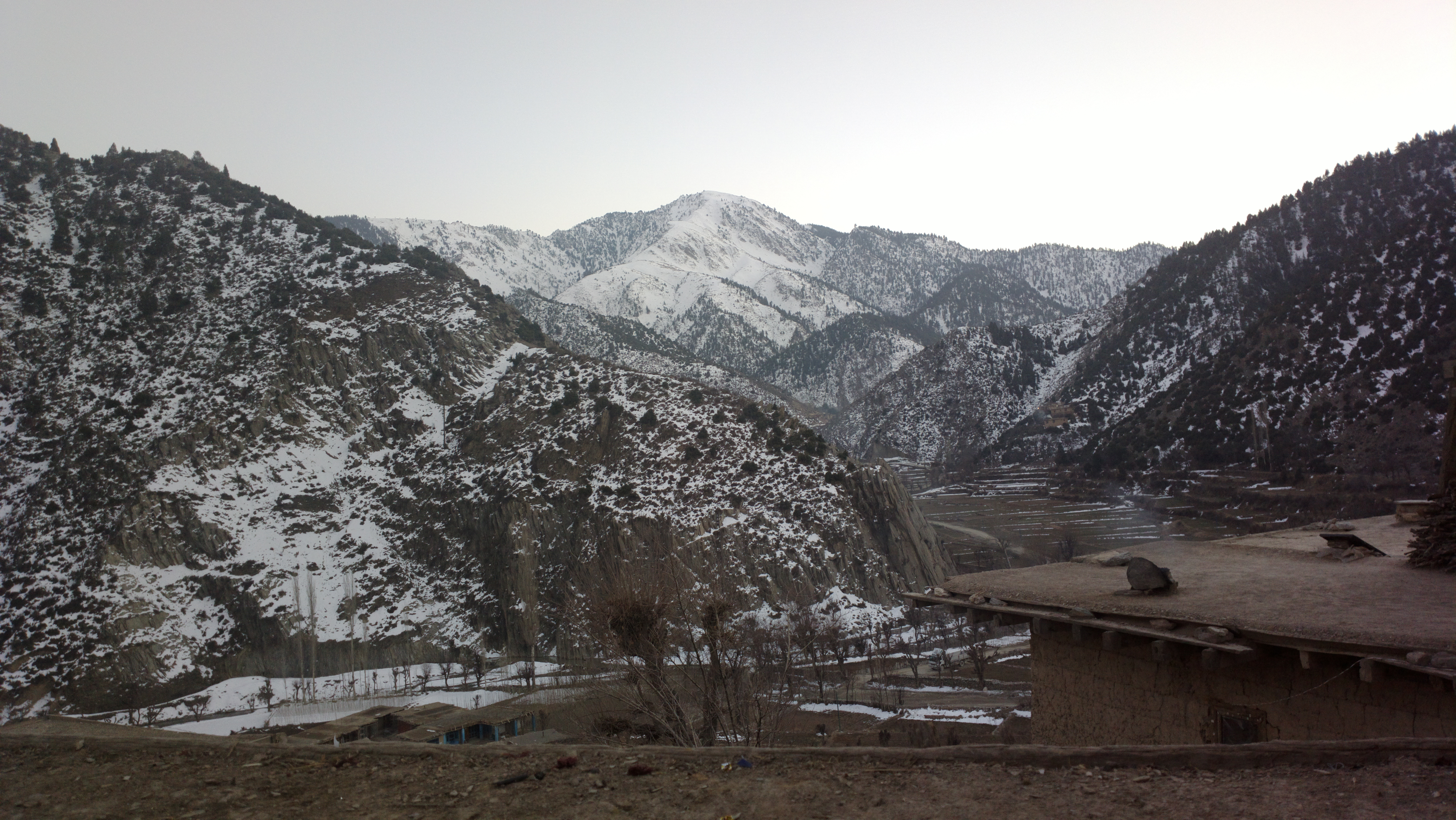
Unnamed road in Janikhel, 2014

== Demographics & population ==
Like in the rest of Afghanistan, no exact population numbers are available. The Afghan Ministry of Rural Rehabilitation & Development (MRRD) along with UNHCR and Central Statistics Office (CSO) of Afghanistan estimated the population of the district to be around 40,340 (CSO 2004). According to the same sources, Pashtuns make up 100% of the total population.
