= N-40 National Highway =

Road in Pakistan

National Highway 40
- قومی شاہراہ ٤٠
- Quetta-Taftan Highway

Route information
- Part of AH2
- Maintained by NHA
- Length: 610 km (380 mi)

Major junctions
- North end: Lakpass near Quetta
- South end: Taftan

Location
- Country: Pakistan

Highway system
- Roads in Pakistan

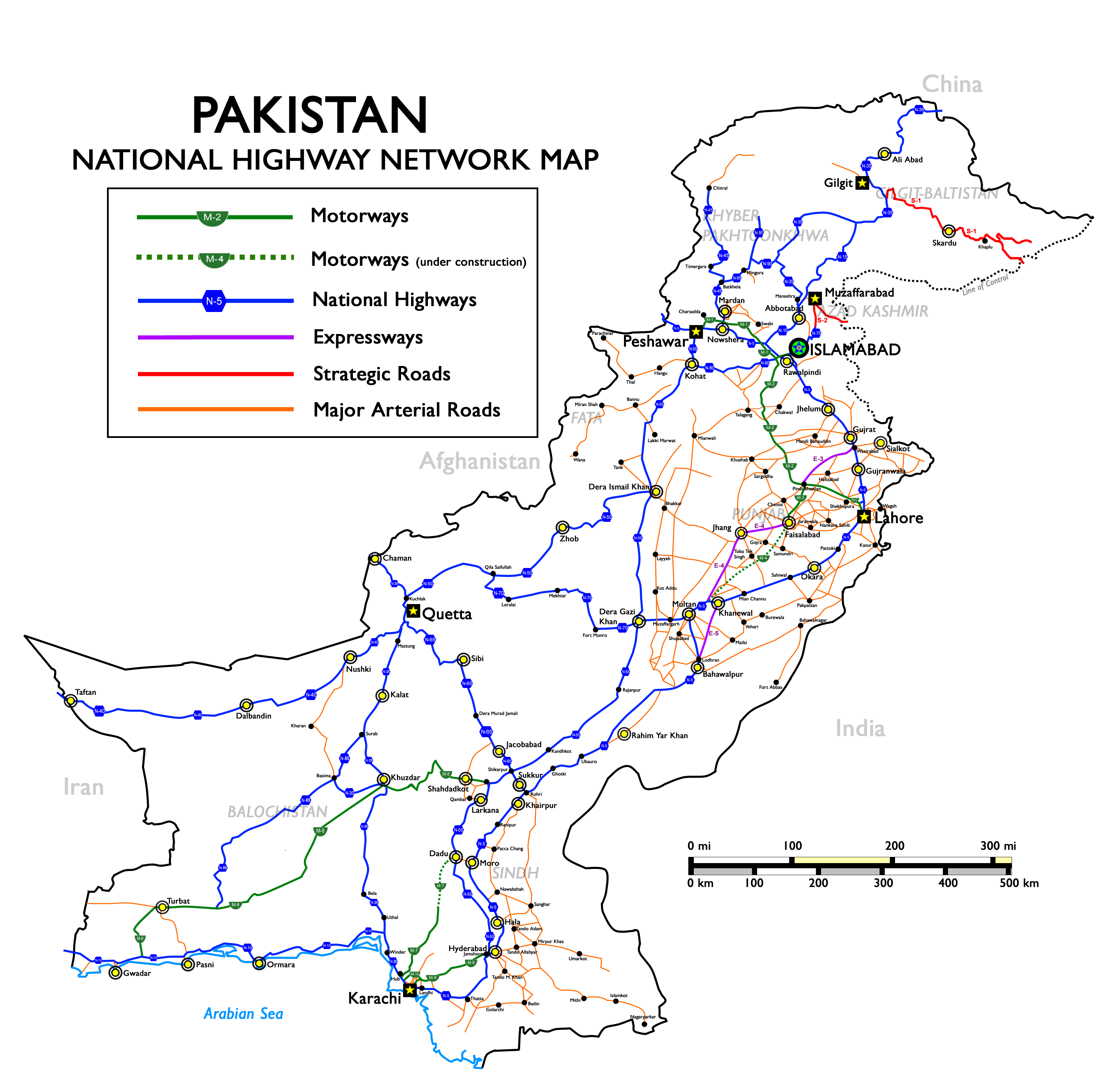
Map of National Highways of Pakistan also indicating N-40

The National Highway 40 (Urdu: قومی شاہراہ ۴۰) or the N-40 is one of the national highways of Pakistan, running from Lakpass near Quetta to the border town of Taftan via Nokkundi in Baluchistan, Pakistan, extending into Iran via Road 84. It is a two-lane highway with a total length of 610 km. It is maintained and operated by Pakistan's National Highway Authority.

== See also ==
- Motorways of Pakistan
- Transport in Pakistan
