= Nils Horner =

Swedish journalist

- Born: Nils Georg Anthony Horner; 5 December 1962; Borås, Sweden
- Died: 11 March 2014 (aged 51); Wazir Akbar Khan, Kabul, Afghanistan
- Cause of death: Shot while on assignment
- Occupation: Journalist
- Years active: 1980s
- Employer: Sveriges Radio
- Awards: Marcus Ölander Prize

Nils Georg Anthony Horner (5 December 1962 – 11 March 2014) was a Swedish radio journalist. Horner was the chief correspondent for Sveriges Radio's Asia division and had covered multiple stories surrounding the War in Afghanistan (2001–2021), as well as natural disasters.

== Personal ==
Nils Horner was born in Borås, Västra Götaland County, Sweden, to Ragnar Georg Vilhelm Horner and Jean Horner. He had one sister, Ingrid, who was four years older. At the age of 10, Nils' family moved into a home in Brämhult, but never really settled down in one place until he accepted his position in Hong Kong. Following his death, his body was laid to rest in his hometown of Borås.

== Career ==
Prior to his work with Sveriges Radio, Horner worked for Borås Tidning and Svenska Dagbladet in the 1980s. From there, he moved to the United States and United Kingdom in the 1990s where he worked as a freelance writer before ultimately joining Sveriges Radio in 2001. During his career, he covered stories including the decline of the Taliban, the 2004 Indian Ocean earthquake and tsunami, and the Fukushima disaster. Horner served as the South Asia correspondent for Sveriges Radio at the time of his death.

He acknowledged the danger he was sometimes in when he spoke in 2011 to a co-worker at Swedish Radio about his decision to stay on the front lines of the Fukushima Daiichi nuclear disaster: "Most journalists are not interested in risking their lives for a story. Some do, but I don't think it's in our culture here at Swedish Radio to take insane risks to do the story and also as radio journalists we don't have to be extremely close to people shooting. As a TV cameraman they have to be very close to get the pictures but we don't feel the same pressure to be always in the middle of some firefight or something but of course we want to be as close as possible and in Japan, I wanted to come close to the people who were thinking of whether they should evacuate or not, so you almost have to ask yourself everyday, is it worth taking the risk or is it not?"

Author Scott Taylor, who describes himself as a "maverick war reporter", described working beside Horner while they investigated the killing of civilians in Kosovo by Serbian forces until the NATO bombing in 1999.

== Death ==
This shows the location of Horner's murder in the Wazir Akbar Khan district in comparison to its location to the central point of Kabul, Afghanistan.

Horner died on 11 March 2014 following a gunshot to the head while outside of a previously attacked restaurant in Kabul. Horner was there to follow up on a terrorist attack the restaurant had suffered two months prior. While on his way to investigate the story, two men shot Horner execution style in the middle of a street in the Wazir Akbar Khan, Kabul district. A division of the Taliban, Fidai Mahaz, claimed the murder citing the theory that Horner was a British spy; however, it is unclear whether these claims are factual or not. The two suspects were caught on video fleeing the area; however, no arrests were made in connection to the murder.

== Context ==
Two months before Horner's death, the Taliban had attacked the same Lebanese restaurant Taverna du Liban, which was a popular spot for "westerners." On 17 January 2014 a suicide bomber led the attack with an explosion near the entrance. This was followed by gunmen who entered the restaurant and began shooting the patrons. Twenty-one people were killed within the restaurant. Only eight of these were locals. The restaurant was destroyed. Horner had returned in March 2014 to interview the cook of the restaurant about the event when he was killed.

== Impact ==
According to the Committee to Protect Journalists, Horner is among almost three dozen journalists who have been killed on the job in Afghanistan alone. Of the 30 journalists' deaths, 87 percent of them happened while they were covering stories about the war.

== Reactions ==
Irina Bokova, director-general of UNESCO, said, "I call on the authorities to investigate this crime and bring the culprits to justice. Media workers must be able to carry out their work and keep society informed. They nurture informed public debate which is essential in carrying out the reconstruction that Afghanistan is striving to achieve."

Director of Swedish Radio Cilla Benkö followed with similar remarks saying, "It is shameful that so little is done to safeguard the working conditions of journalists. UNESCO's report indicates that, especially in the Arab world and many countries in Africa, deaths are frighteningly common with a very low rate of solving cases of killed journalists. The figure is between 1% and 3%. That compares to approximately 40% in Europe, but even there a majority of the cases remain unsolved. There ought to be more than enough reasons for politicians to challenge these truly lamentable percentages and work towards finding ways of improving them. Journalists who do not have to fear, and who can work without risking being silenced, are fundamental for functioning democracies."

== Awards ==
- Marcus Ölander Prize

Since Horner's murder in 2014, an award and sculpture have been put in place in his honour. Borås Tidning and the Tore G Wärenstam Foundation, as well as the Radio and journalism education programme at the University of Gothenburg, have since awarded one journalist each year that exemplifies Horner's spirit with a cash prize. It is called the Nils Horner Prize.

== See also ==
- List of journalists killed during the War in Afghanistan (2001–2021)
