= April 2016 Kabul attack =

Attack in Kabul, Afghanistan

- Part of War in Afghanistan (2001–2021), Operation Omari
- Kabul (Afghanistan)
- Location: 34.5553°N 69.2075°E; Kabul, Afghanistan
- Date: 19 April 2016
- Target: Government employees
- Attack type: Mass murder, suicide bombing
- Weapons: Bomb, guns
- Deaths: 69 (62; 7)†
- Injuries: 367+ (347; 20+)†
- Perpetrator: Taliban
- † First number in brackets: primary attack Second number in brackets: attack on broadcaster

On the morning of 19 April 2016, Taliban militants attacked a security team responsible for protecting government VIPs in Kabul, Afghanistan. The initial attack killed 64 people and wounded 347. It was their biggest attack on an urban area since 2001.

== Bombings ==
Local broadcaster TOLOnews reported that the attack involved a suicide bomber detonating a vehicle laden with "hundreds of kilograms of explosives" and the militants then making their way into the compound of "Department 10" of the National Directorate of Security (NDS) and opening fire. The bomb that detonated caused a ceiling to collapse in a classroom where elite intelligence officers were being trained. An Afghan security official said members of that unit accounted for about half of the people killed. The local broadcast station said that a two-hour gun battle ensued between the militants and security forces.

== Developments ==
Sediq Sediqi, a spokesman for the Afghani Interior Ministry, said that despite the target, most of the victims were civilians. Ismail Kawasi, spokesman for the Public Health Ministry, said that 327 wounded have been brought to area hospitals. On 20 April 2016, Sediqi confirmed in a tweet that 64 "innocent Afghans" were killed and 347 wounded.

Afghan Taliban spokesman Zabihullah Mujahid claimed responsibility for the attack. He said as many as 92 security staff and soldiers were killed. It came after the group announced its annual spring offensive Operation Omari.

== Reactions ==
=== Domestic ===
President Ashraf Ghani issued a statement saying that the attack proved that the Taliban were growing weak and therefore resorting to asymmetric warfare. Shortly after the attack, women's rights activist Wazhma Frogh wrote on Twitter that the attacks took place near schools and that parents were attempting to protect their children.

Some parliamentarians strongly condemned President Ashraf Ghani for failing to provide security from the attacks.

=== International ===
==== Supranational unions ====
- NATO: General John W. Nicholson Jr., commander of the Resolute Support Mission, said the attack was a sign of the Taliban's weakness.
- United Nations: the Security Council said that those involved should be brought to justice

==== Countries ====
- India: Prime Minister Narendra Modi tweeted that his condolences and that his prayers were with those affected by the attacks.
- Turkey: Foreign Ministry statemented condemning the attack, they expressed condolences. In addition, they said they supported the Government of Afghanistan in its fight against terrorism.
- United States: White House spokesman Josh Earnest called for the Taliban to cease activities that harmed civilians, and to instead 'pursue a pathway of peace'. The Embassy of the United States, Kabul said the attack underscored the harm the Taliban continued to inflict on the Afghan people.
