= Dadullah =

Afghan Taliban commander (1966–2007)

Dadullah Akhund
- Native name: دادالله آخوند
- Born: c. 1966–1967; Uruzgan Province, Kingdom of Afghanistan
- Died: May 11, 2007 (aged 40) Asadullah Khan Akah Drop, Garmsir, Helmand, Islamic Republic of Afghanistan
- Allegiance: Taliban
- Service years: 1994–2007
- Rank: Commander
- Conflicts: Soviet–Afghan War; Afghan civil war War in Afghanistan

Dadullah (1966 – May 11, 2007) was the Taliban's most senior militant commander in Afghanistan until his death in 2007. He was also known as Maulawi or Mullah Dadullah Akhund (Pashto: ملا دادالله آخوند). He also earned the nickname of Lang, meaning "lame" (as in Timur Lang), because of a leg he lost during fighting.

An ethnic Pashtun from the Kakar tribe of Kandahar Province, he was known as "The Butcher", even among fellow Taliban members, for his brutality and outbursts of violence, notably in cutting men's heads off, as per some, even being stripped of his command at least twice by Mullah Omar due to his extreme behavior.

According to the United Nations' list of entities belonging to or associated with the Al-Qaeda organization, he had been the Taliban's Minister of Construction. He was killed by British and German special forces.

== Early life ==
Dadullah belonged to the Kakar tribe of Pashtuns. Educated in a madrassa in Balochistan, he was a follower of Deobandi Sunni Islam. He lost a leg while fighting with the Afghan mujahideen against Soviet occupation in the 1980s. He eventually got a prosthetic limb from a hospital in Karachi.

He was a member of the Taliban's 10-man leadership council before the US-led invasion in 2001. He was reportedly a close aide to Mohammed Omar, the leader of the Taliban.

During the Afghan civil war, Dadullah gained a reputation as a stern, devout and ruthless commander. Between 1997–1998, he led around 6000 Taliban troops who were besieged in Kunduz. As a commander, he was known for making quick decisions and being strict with his soldiers. In one instance, he shot one of his own men who was running away from the battlefield. In 1999–2000, he led the suppression of a revolt by Hazaras in Bamyan province. In January 2001, Dadullah's forces fought a Hazara insurgency in the Yakaolang area. On March 10, 2001, he supervised the destruction of the Buddhas of Bamiyan, which had been ordered by Omar. When the Taliban regime fell in December 2001, Dadullah escaped capture by Northern Alliance forces in Kunduz province.

== Fight post 2001 ==
Following rumors that Dadullah may be headed to recapture the city with as many as 8,000 Taliban fighters, after the November 2001 Battle of Mazar-i-Sharif, a thousand American ground forces were airlifted into the city.

He allegedly participated (by giving orders via cell phone) in the murder of Ricardo Munguía on March 27, 2003. In 2005 he was sentenced in absentia to life in prison, along with three others, by Pakistan for the attempted murder of a member of Pakistan's parliament, Muhammad Khan Sherani of the Jamiat Ulema-i-Islam party. Sherani, an opponent of the Taliban, survived an IED attack in his home constituency of Balochistan in November, 2004.

Dadullah masterminded the 2006 Taliban offensive and had earned a notorious reputation amongst NATO forces by the end of the year. Some Americans nicknamed him the "Afghan Zarqawi," drawing parallels to Abu Musab al-Zarqawi, the founder of Al-Qaeda in Iraq. The comparison stemmed from their similarities in galvanizing the insurgency in their respective countries, their vocal support for Al-Qaeda and Osama bin Laden, as well as their brutal conduct, which stirred controversy even amongst their own hardline supporters. A "Western intelligence source" claimed Dadullah may have been operating out of Quetta, Pakistan. Others, including the Pakistani government, claimed he was operating near Kandahar, Afghanistan. It was in southern Afghanistan that he was later killed. In 2006, he claimed to have 12,000 men and to control 20 districts in the former Taliban heartland in the southern provinces of Kandahar, Helmand, Zabul and Orūzgān.

Dadullah had reportedly been a central figure in the recruitment of Pakistani nationals to the Taliban and was also one of the main Taliban spokesmen, frequently meeting with Al-Jazeera television reporters. In the summer of 2006, he was reportedly sent by Omar to South Waziristan to convince local Pashtun insurgents to agree to a truce with Pakistan. In October 2006 it was rumored that the Afghan government was considering giving control of its defense ministry over to Dadullah as part of a reconciliation plan with the Taliban to stop the ongoing insurgency.

Dadullah was linked to massacres of Shi'a, the scorched earth policy of Shi'a villages in 2001 (which he boasted about once on the radio), and the summary execution of men suspected of throwing hand grenades into his compound in 2001 (they were hanged at one of the main roundabouts). According to an interview he gave to the BBC, he had hundreds of suicide bombers waiting for his orders to launch an offensive against NATO troops.

Dadullah oversaw Taliban negotiations for the hostage-taking of Italian reporter Daniele Mastrogiacomo and his two Afghan assistants in March 2007. Mastrogiacomo's driver was later beheaded. Mastrogiacomo was reportedly exchanged for five senior Taliban leaders, including Ustad Yasir, Abdul Latif Hakimi, Mansoor Ahmad, a brother of Dadullah, and two commanders identified as Hamdullah and Abdul Ghaffar. The Taliban threatened to kill the interpreter Ajmal Naqshbandi, one of Mastrogiacomo's two Afghan assistants, on March 29, 2007, unless the Kabul government freed two Taliban prisoners. Ajmal was later beheaded after the Afghan government refused to free any more Taliban prisoners. According to Asadullah Khalid, the governor of Kandahar Province, "Mullah Dadullah was the backbone of the Taliban. He was a brutal and cruel commander who killed and beheaded Afghan civilians."

== Death ==
Afghan officials reported on May 13, 2007 that Dadullah was killed the previous evening in Helmand Province in a raid by joint Afghan and NATO forces known to have included C Squadron, Special Boat Service (SBS), a British special forces unit, after he left his "sanctuary" for a meeting with fellow commanders, in southern Afghanistan. Some reports indicate Dadullah was killed in the Gershk district, while others claim he was killed near the Sangin and Nari Saraj district. Asadullah Khalid, the governor of Kandahar province, put the body of Dadullah on display at his official residence. The body appeared to have three bullet wounds, two in the torso and one in the back of the head. The Taliban named Mansoor Dadullah (Mullah Bakht), Dadullah's younger brother, as his replacement.

On June 7, 2007, the Taliban said that Dadullah's body had been returned to them, in exchange for four Afghan health ministry workers who had been held hostage, and had been buried by his family in Kandahar. The Taliban said that a fifth hostage had been beheaded because Dadullah's body was not returned quickly enough.

== Post-death ==
Dadullah's death severely weakened the Taliban's fighting capabilities, as he had been their most prominent commander up to that point. Following his death, many Taliban leaders retreated to Pakistan, and seven of his senior commanders abandoned the insurgency entirely. However, some leaders formed the new Mullah Dadullah Front in response to his killing. This group became notorious for assassinating Afghan officials and launching suicide attacks against Afghan police posts. Over time, the Dadullah Front came to be known as one of the most extremist factions within the Taliban.

Because of his brutal reputation, Dadullah remained a popular, if controversial, figure amongst the Taliban ranks after his death. One Taliban commander later recalled in a 2014 interview:

When he was alive, half of Helmand was in our hands, as well as many districts of Kandahar province. He was a very cruel person; all the people were afraid of him. No one would ever dare to wrong him. He would tell people that either they captured an area or they were not to return to him.

== See also ==
- Mullah Dadullah Front
