= Taftan, Pakistan =

Taftan تفتان
- Town
- Taftan
- Location within Balochistan, Pakistan Location within Pakistan
- Coordinates: 28.948°N 61.5844°E
- Country: Pakistan
- Province: Balochistan
- District: Western Chagai

Population (2023)
  - Total: 19,259
- Time zone: UTC+5 (PST)
- Calling code: 0825

Taftan (Urdu: تفتان) is a town in Western Chagai, Balochistan, Pakistan. It is one of Pakistan's border crossings with Iran. It is by either road or rail over 500 km (310 mi) from Quetta.

Taftan is officially a tehsil of District Western Chagai, and Nokkundi is the headquarters of District Western Chagai.

It is 62 kilometres (39 mi) northeast of the thermally active dark peak or small massif also called Taftan, wholly in Iran.

At its western extreme, the border crossing point of Iran is Mirjaveh.

== Demographics ==
Population

Historical population

Year	Pop.	±%
1998	7,666	—
2017	18,510	+141.5%

Year	Pop.	±%
2023	19,259	+4.0%

== Transport ==
It is on the N40 road. This becomes the road 84 in Iran's system, and which meanders via Kerman to a number change west of Rafsanjan.

It is served by its railway station, Koh-e-Taftan railway station, on the line commonly described as the Quetta-Taftan Line but which, since 1940, continues to Zahedan, Iran.

== See also ==
- Koh-e-Taftan railway station
- Taftan (Volcano)
