= Aftermath of the Afghanistan War (2001–2021) =

Aftermath of the Afghanistan War

The war in Afghanistan ended with the Taliban victorious when the United States withdrew its troops from Afghanistan. The aftermath has been characterized by marked change in the social and political order of Afghanistan as Taliban took over the country once again after the fall of Kabul in 2021.

The aftermath has included the disintegration of the US-trained and funded Afghan Army, and a humanitarian and economic crisis due to the effects of the war, suspension of foreign aid, frozen monetary assets, and drought. Conflict has continued in Afghanistan, with the continuing conflict with the Islamic State, and a Republican insurgency against the Taliban in multiple provinces.

== Background ==
The United States was involved in conflict in Afghanistan, in one way or another, for forty-two years, starting with the Soviet–Afghan War in 1979. The U.S. funded and armed the Afghan mujahideen fighting against Soviet-backed communist government. In 2001, The U.S. took control of Afghanistan after the invasion. During the U.S. Army's stay in Afghanistan, they trained the Afghan Army. It is estimated that the United States spent more than $80 billion to train the Afghan Army so they could defend their government after the withdrawal.

Some events during the same period, such as U.S. Marines urinating on Taliban fighters, Maywand District murders, and the Kandahar massacre, undermined public support for the government.

== Aftermath ==
=== Collapse of Afghan Army ===
Following the withdrawal of NATO troops from Afghanistan in the summer of 2021, in addition to a rapid offensive conducted by the Taliban, the Afghan National Army largely disintegrated, with large numbers of ANA soldiers abandoning their posts or surrendering en masse to the Taliban, allowing the Taliban to capture large quantities of US-provided military equipment, vehicles and aircraft. Soon, all the regional forces of the ANA had dissolved, with the exception of the 201st Corps and the 111th Capital Division, both of which were headquartered in Kabul, which was now surrounded by the Taliban. On 15 August 2021, the Taliban entered the outskirts of Kabul from multiple directions, beginning the fall of Kabul. On the same day, President Ashraf Ghani fled the country to Dubai. It was reported that ANA soldiers were fleeing to neighbouring countries in droves, some on foot and others onboard Afghan Air Force aircraft. At 8:55 pm local time, Taliban forces seized the Arg and raised their flag, soon afterwards declaring the restoration of the Islamic Emirate of Afghanistan.

As many as 150,000 Afghans who assisted the United States remained in Afghanistan, including individuals who worked closely with US military forces. Hundreds of former members of the Afghan Special Forces have been refused resettlement to the UK. One former UK Special Forces officer told the BBC that "At a time when certain actions by UK Special Forces are under investigation by a public inquiry, their headquarters also had the power to prevent former Afghan Special Forces colleagues and potential witnesses to these actions from getting safely to the UK."

=== Formation of the Taliban government and international recognition ===
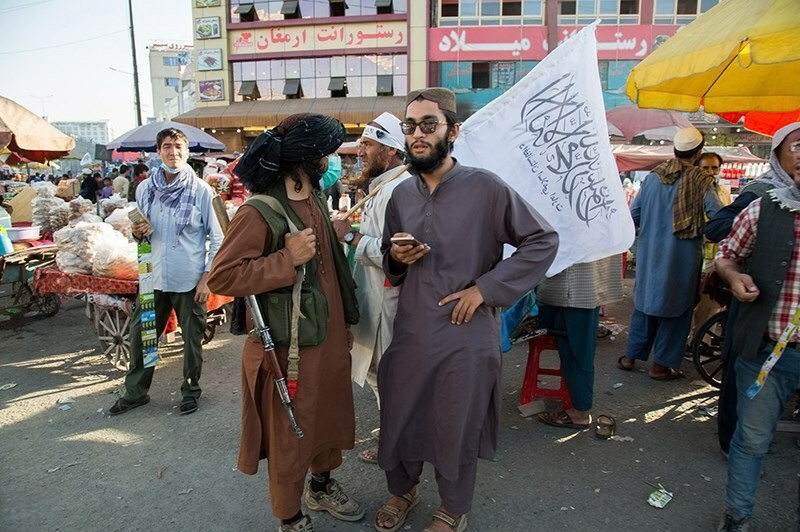
Taliban militants at a market in Kabul, September 2021. A vendor selling Islamic Emirate apparel can be seen.

On 7 September 2021, an interim government headed by Mohammad Hassan Akhund as Prime Minister was declared by the Taliban. The Taliban also requested to send a new envoy to the UN to represent Afghanistan in the future. If accepted, it would be a milestone towards international recognition. This, however, appears unlikely due to the economic collapse and political infighting that soon engulfed the recently reestablished emirate.

According to a Human Rights Watch report released in November 2021, the Taliban killed or forcibly disappeared more than 100 former members of the Afghan security forces in the three months since the takeover in just the four provinces of Ghazni, Helmand, Kandahar, and Kunduz. According to the report, the Taliban identified targets for arrest and execution through intelligence operations and access to employment records that were left behind. Former members of the security forces were also killed by the Taliban within days of registering with them to receive a letter guaranteeing their safety.

=== Republican insurgency ===
On 17 August 2021, Vice President Amrullah Saleh, citing provisions of the Constitution of Afghanistan, declared himself President of Afghanistan after Ashraf Ghani fled Afghanistan, from a base of operations in the Panjshir Valley, which had not been taken by Taliban forces, and vowed to continue military operations against the Taliban from there. His claim to the presidency was endorsed by Ahmad Massoud and Islamic Republic of Afghanistan Minister of Defence Bismillah Khan Mohammadi. The Panjshir-based resistance recaptured the provincial capital of Charikar on 17 August 2021. By 6 September the Taliban had gained control over most of the valley, but armed resistance continued in the upper valleys. Clashes in the valley mostly ceased by mid-September. The leaders of the resistance, Saleh and Massoud reportedly fled to neighboring Tajikistan in late September.

Several northern regions had become the site of an anti-Taliban guerrilla campaign by early 2022. At least 14 armed anti-Taliban resistance groups, including the National Resistance Front and Afghanistan Freedom Front are active in Afghanistan.

The Institute for the Study of War assessed that the NRF controlled at least five villages in Tagab District, Badakhshan Province for a few days in June 2022, and a valley in Khost wa Fereng District, Baghlan Province for less than one month in July 2022. On 17 November 2022, FDD's Long War Journal assessed that the NRF controlled a small number of bases, villages, and valleys across eight districts in northeastern Afghanistan.

=== Islamic State activity ===
Following the 2021 Kabul airport attack conducted by the terrorist group Islamic State of Iraq and the Levant – Khorasan Province (a branch of the ISIL), the US and the Taliban have mutually agreed together to fight against the ISIS terrorists in the International military intervention against ISIL.

Since the U.S. withdrawal from Afghanistan, Islamic State's affiliate's attacks in Afghanistan have surged, particularly on minorities such as Hazaras. In 2021, Afghanistan suffered large number of casualties and top the list issued after a global survey of Islamic State casualties. As of September 2022, about thirteen attacks against Hazaras have been attributed to Islamic State.

As of October 2024, IS-KP is the largest and strongest of all the terror groups active in Afghanistan, with the Taliban appearing to view IS-KP as the primary threat to their rule.

=== War crimes ===
In October 2021, the chief prosecutor of the International Criminal Court, Karim Ahmad Khan, indicated that they will open cases related to war crimes in Afghanistan. The court will not investigate alleged crimes by the U.S. and its allies, due to a law enacted by the U.S. called American Service-Members' Protection Act and bilateral treaties with friendly countries, which protects U.S. military personnel from international prosecution.

=== Humanitarian crisis ===
Following the Taliban takeover, western nations suspended humanitarian aid and the World Bank and International Monetary Fund also halted payments to Afghanistan. The Biden administration froze about $9 billion in assets belonging to the Afghan central banks, blocking the Taliban from accessing billions of dollars held in US bank accounts.

In October, the UN stated that more than half of Afghanistan's 39 million people faced an acute food shortage. According to The New York Times, "the crisis is, in large part, American-made, imposed by deliberate policy choices with results that were predicted months in advance." They also cited factors such as drought, which has damaged food production, and the fighting during the Taliban takeover, which has disrupted basic services and displaced many to cities. On October 20, Taliban's chief spokesman Zabihullah Mujahid told CBS News that "On the one hand they say a million children will die, but on the other, the US are holding our money. The US should release our money so we can save more children."

On 11 November 2021, the Human Rights Watch reported that Afghanistan is facing widespread famine due to collapsed economy and broken banking system. The UN World Food Program has also issued multiple warnings of worsening food insecurity. World leaders pledged $1.2 billion in humanitarian aid to Afghanistan.

On 22 December 2021, The United Nations Security Council unanimously adopted a US-proposed resolution to help humanitarian aid reach desperate Afghans, while seeking to keep funds out of Taliban hands. The Under-Secretary-General for Humanitarian Affairs, Martin Griffiths, described the council's passage of resolution 2615 (2021) as “evidence of how seriously Member States take the shocking levels of need and suffering in the country.”

Support in form of wheat has been provided by various countries, including India.

In December 2023, speaking about the situation in Afghanistan, WHO Director-General Tedros Adhanom Ghebreyesus said that 30% of the Afghan population was facing acute food insecurity, adding that "Close to 1 million children are severely malnourished and 2.3 million are suffering from moderate acute malnutrition. WHO needs $ 185 million to continue providing medicine and supporting hospitals to prevent more Afghan children and women from dying of malnutrition and the consequences of food insecurity."

in 2025, health facilities providing medical care to over a million ceased operations or were closed as part of the Trump administrations cuts to the United States Agency for International Development.

=== Economic crisis ===
An already fragile economy worsened further in the aftermath. Due to sanctions and high energy prices, poverty level has increased in the country. An economic crisis brewed in the country when the United States decided to freeze Da Afghanistan Bank's, the central bank of Afghanistan, assets of $9.5bn. This increased selling pressure on its currency, Afghan afghani, and it extended a significant drop in value. An already broken banking system has collapsed further and has given rise to the hawala and related crimes in the country. About 80 percent Afghans are facing debt due to this economic crisis. Many Afghans withdrew and closed their bank accounts because of losing trust in the banking system and over economic and financial sanctions against Afghanistan and the country is cut-off from the SWIFT financial network.

=== Deportation of undocumented Afghans from Iran and Pakistan ===
On 3 October 2023, Pakistan's Interior Minister Sarfraz Bugti ordered that all undocumented immigrants, particularly the nearly 1.73 million Afghan nationals, voluntarily leave the country by 1 November 2023 or face deportation in a crackdown. Iran also decided to deport Afghan refugees back to Afghanistan. Taliban authorities condemned the deportations of Afghans as an "inhuman act." As of March 2025 Iran began the 2025 Afghan deportation from Iran aiming to expel over four million Afghan refugees suffering from inhuman conditions.

=== Active armed terrorist groups ===
Despite the Taliban's promise in the 2020 Doha Agreement to cut ties with Al-Qaeda and to not become a terrorist safe haven once again, several designated armed terrorist groups seem to be active in Afghanistan some of them include:

- Haqqani Network (as part of the Taliban)
- Al-Qaeda
  - Al-Qaeda in the Indian subcontinent
    - Islamic Movement of Uzbekistan (Al-Qaeda faction)
- Islamic State – Khorasan Province
  - Jundallah
  - Islamic Movement of Uzbekistan (IS faction)
- Pakistani Taliban
- Turkistan Islamic Party
- Jamaat Ansarullah (as part of the Taliban)
- Baloch Liberation Army
- Baloch Liberation Front

Additionally between 10 and 14 Pakistani extremists groups, including: Lashkar-e-Taiba, Hafiz Gul Bahadur Group, Tariq Gidar Group, Jaish-e-Mohammed, Al-Badr, Islamic State – Pakistan Province and Lashkar-e-Islam.

Although they have launched sweeping efforts at disarmament, including unprecedented house-to-house searches to hunt for weapons and confiscate materiel, the Taliban's way of handling of these groups aims at containing them without provoking them to turn against their government.
