= Black tax =

Money given by Black workers to family members

Black tax is a term that originated in South Africa and refers to money that Black workers, especially professionals and other higher income earners give to their parents, siblings, or other family members, often out of obligation or a deeply ingrained sense of family responsibility. It has been described as Ubuntu (a philosophy that humans must live in sharing relationships with each other), but with an incapacitating twist for the Black professional. A similar socially imposed obligation to care for parents and other family members in Latino culture is called the brown tax.

For example, a Black professional may earn a desirable income, but may have expenses that do not appear in the household budgets of people from more individualistic cultures, such as paying for the basic needs of a parent or other family member who is unable to afford healthcare, housing, heat, or other essentials. In other cases, the Black tax can take the form of an individual letting a family member or someone from their hometown live with them at no charge, which raises the cost of housing and food for that individual.

== Givers and takers ==
The eldest child in the family is often expected to pay for their younger siblings' needs.

The pressure to support others can be greatest for the first-generation college students, whose less-educated parents may have made sacrifices to help their child become a well-paid professional, which may result in the child feeling obligated to financially "pay back" the past support.

People who are perceived as having a high income may receive many requests. Africans who have moved abroad also experience a very high level of pressure because their families have unrealistic expectations about their income compared to the cost of living in a wealthier country.

Recipients may include immediate family members, extended family members, and, if the person marries, their in-laws.

== Causes ==
Some of the causes are individual, such as death or divorce leading a single mother to seek financial support from relatives. Other causes are structural, such as historical loss of land ownership during European colonization of Africa and the inability of corrupt or impoverished governments to provide tuition-free schools or guaranteed pensions.

== Effects ==
These expenses mean that a Black professional with poorer relatives or with greater amounts of debt is unable to save as much money as another person at a similar income level who does not have the same familial financial pressures.

In some cases, if the "taxed" person does not meet expectations, family members who feel neglected may lose trust in them, or it may cause a loss of social status for their family. Some find it difficult to set and enforce boundaries. Those receiving support may feel grateful. In other cases, the family members needing support may feel resentful, because other people treat the family members paying the support with more respect.

Caring for these struggling relatives raises the quality of life for the family members they help, but it does so at the cost of reducing their own individual savings for buying a home or for retirement, and it perpetuates the inequality of wealth. These professionals may also hope to break the cycle of poverty and relieve the next generation of similar burdens and to build generational wealth, which could entail simultaneously paying for their older family members' and their own immediate needs, as well as saving for their future needs and their own children's future education and other expenses. They may also give up on their own educational opportunities, with the belief that they need to be earning money as soon as possible.

== In popular culture ==
UK-based Zimbabwean author Masimba Musodza's short story entitled Black Tax explores the phenomenon in the context of Zimbabweans living in the United Kingdom and other wealthy nations who support relatives back home.

== See also ==
- Remittance – transfers of money from an individual living abroad to family in their home country
- Sandwich generation – people who have to care for their parents and their children at the same time
