= Impact of the War in Afghanistan (2001–2021) =

The 20-year-long War in Afghanistan had a number of significant impacts on Afghan society.

== Casualties ==
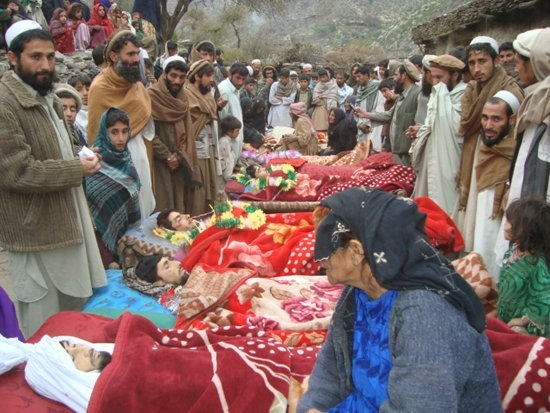
Victims of the Narang night raid that killed at least 10 Afghan civilians, December 2009

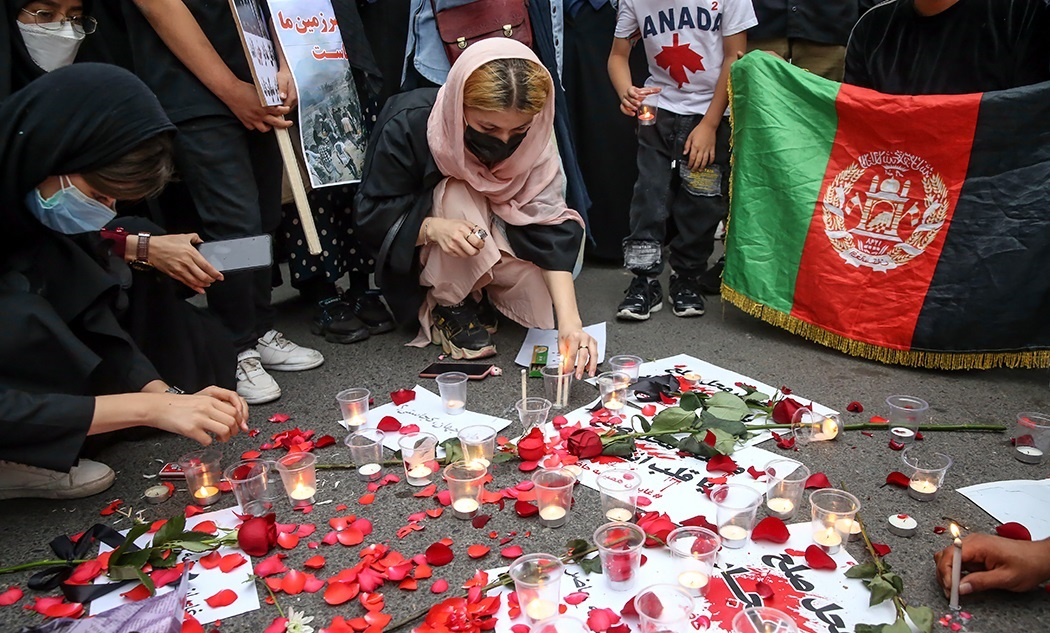
Gathering outside Afghan embassy in Tehran to condemn the 2021 Kabul school bombing

According to the Costs of War Project at Brown University, the war killed 46,319 Afghan civilians in Afghanistan. However, the death toll is possibly higher due to unaccounted deaths by "disease, loss of access to food, water, infrastructure, and/or other indirect consequences of the war". A report titled Body Count put together by Physicians for Social Responsibility, Physicians for Global Survival and International Physicians for the Prevention of Nuclear War (IPPNW) concluded that 106,000–170,000 civilians have been killed as a result of the fighting in Afghanistan at the hands of all parties to the conflict.

The majority of civilian casualties were attributed to anti-government elements each year, though the figure varied from 61% to 80%, with the average hovering around 75% due to the Taliban and other anti-government elements. The United Nations Assistance Mission in Afghanistan (UNAMA) started publishing civilian casualty figures in 2008. These figures attribute approximately 41% of civilian casualties to government aligned forces in 2008; this percentage lowers to approximately 18% in 2015.

Civilian deaths caused by non-Afghan Coalition forces were low later in the war after most foreign troops were withdrawn and the coalition shifted to airstrikes. For example, in 2015 pro-government forces caused 17% of civilian deaths and injuries – including United States and NATO troops, which were responsible for only 2% of the casualties. 2016 had a similar 2% figure. Civilian deaths were higher as well in the latter part of the war, with 2015 and 2016 both consecutively breaking the record of annual civilian deaths according to the UN.

Following the overthrow of the Taliban government in 2001, many Taliban and al-Qaeda fighters fled to Pakistan. In 2004, an armed conflict began in North-West Pakistan between the Pakistan Armed Forces and Tehrik-i-Taliban Pakistan, al-Qaeda, and other allied groups. The conflict killed 67,000 people in total from 2001 to 2021, according to the Costs of War Project.

== Costs ==
The Pentagon's near-final estimate of the cost of the war in Afghanistan, including reconstruction, was $825 billion. This was provided in its 2020 year-end "Cost of War Report." Another estimate that was recognized by US President Joe Biden put the costs at over $2 trillion. As of 2013, the UK's contribution to the war in Afghanistan came to £37 billion ($56.46 billion). For years, US officials had considered the cost of the war while discussing when to draw down troops. In 2011, for example, the average cost of deploying a US soldier in Afghanistan exceeded US$1 million a year. In March 2013, Linda Bilmes at Harvard Kennedy School estimated that the long-term costs of the US wars in Afghanistan and Iraq would come to total at least US$4 to $6 trillion, with a significant portion of the cost due to disability for veterans and interest payments on debt through to 2050. As of 2021, Brown University estimates that the war in Afghanistan has already cost $2.261 trillion, out of which $530 billion has been spent on interest payments and $296 billion has been spent on veterans' care.

=== Inefficient aid ===
Corruption and inefficiency resulted in significant amounts of international aid not reaching their intended targets. In the first decade of the war, the United States lost between $31 and $60 billion to waste and fraud. In the summer of 2013, preparing for withdrawal the following year, the US military destroyed over 77,000 metric tons of equipment and vehicles worth over $7 billion that could not be shipped back to the United States. Some was sold to Afghans as scrap metal. In 2013, the Special Inspector General for Afghanistan Reconstruction, a US government oversight body, criticized the misuse or waste of hundreds of millions of dollars in US aid, including the $772 million purchase of aircraft for the Afghan military especially since "the Afghans lack the capacity to operate and maintain them".

In interviews conducted for the Special Inspector General for Afghanistan Reconstruction's Lessons Learned Program, one interviewee estimated that 40 percent of US aid to Afghanistan since 2001 ended up in the pockets of corrupt officials, warlords, criminals and insurgents. Ryan Crocker, former ambassador to Afghanistan and Iraq, told the investigators in a 2016 interview, "You just cannot put those amounts of money into a very fragile state and society, and not have it fuel corruption."

== Refugees ==
Foreign donated clothing being handed out by an Afghan civil officer to children at a refugee camp, 2011

Since 2001, more than 5.7 million former refugees have returned to Afghanistan, but 2.6 million others remained refugees in 2021 and few refugees were returning. After many years of returning refugees, the tide started to turn both due to a poor economic situation and a significant increase of violence, leading to increasing numbers fleeing as of 2009.

In January 2013 the UN estimated that 547,550 were internally displaced persons, a 25% increase over the 447,547 IDPs estimated for January 2012 400,000 people were displaced in 2020 and 200,000 were displaced in the first half of 2021.

Afghan refugees resettled per 100K residents after the 2021 Afghan withdrawal and evacuation in each U.S. state and the District of Columbia, according to CBS News.

As of 2020, Pakistan has taken in the largest number of Afghan refugees, followed by Iran. Smaller numbers have taken refuge in India, Indonesia and Tajikistan. Outside Asia, Germany took in by far the largest number of refugees as well as the largest amount of asylum seekers.

Following the Taliban takeover, over 122,000 people were airlifted abroad from Kabul airport, during the evacuation from Afghanistan, including Afghans, American citizens, and other foreign citizens.

A year after the Taliban takeover, the United States had accepted over 85,000 Afghan refugees, many of whom had been processed in Europe and the Middle East. The United Arab Emirates agreed to temporarily host Afghan refugees in Abu Dhabi on behalf of other nations. Over 10,000 have been resettled to the United States from Abu Dhabi, but 12,000 remained there as of August 2022, leading to protests by refugees over the resettlement process and living conditions.

== Drug trade ==
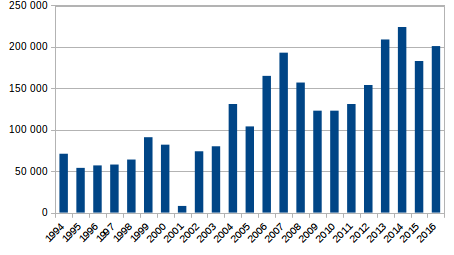
Afghanistan opium poppy cultivation, 1994–2016 (hectares)

From 1996 to 1999, the Taliban controlled 96% of Afghanistan's poppy fields and made opium its largest source of revenue though taxes on opium exports. According to Rashid, "drug money funded the weapons, ammunition and fuel for the war". By 2000 Afghanistan accounted for an estimated 75% of the world's opium supply with an estimated 3,276 tonnes produced. Omar then banned opium cultivation and production dropped to an estimated 74 metric tonnes. Some observers say the ban – which came in a bid for international recognition at the United Nations – was issued only to raise opium prices and increase profit from the sale of large existing stockpiles. In September 2001 – before the 11 September attacks against the US – the Taliban allegedly authorized Afghan peasants to sow opium again.

Soon after the invasion opium production increased markedly. By 2005, Afghanistan was producing 90% of the world's opium, most of which was processed into heroin and sold in Europe and Russia.

According to a 2018 report by the Special Inspector General for Afghanistan Reconstruction (SIGAR), the US spent $8.6 billion since 2002 to stop Afghanistan's drug trade and deny the Taliban a revenue source. A May 2021 SIGAR report estimated that the Taliban earn 60% of their annual revenue from the trade, while UN officials estimated more than $400 million was earned by the Taliban from the trade between 2018 and 2019, however other experts have disputed this and estimated that the Taliban earns at most $40 million annually from the drug trade.

== Health and well-being ==
Between 2001 and 2021, Afghanistan experienced improvements in health, education and women's rights. Life expectancy increased from 56 to 64 years and the maternal mortality rate was reduced by half. 89% of residents living in cities have access to clean water, up from 16% in 2001. The rate of child marriage has been reduced by 17%. The population of Afghanistan increased by more than 50% between 2001 and 2014, while its GDP grew eightfold.

A September 2019 Taliban attack destroyed most buildings of the main hospital in southern Afghanistan and killed almost 40 people, due to which the country is now reportedly struggling to efficiently fight against the COVID-19 pandemic.

== Public education ==
As of 2013, 8.2 million Afghans attended school, up from 1.2 million in 2001. The literacy rate has risen from 8% to 43% since 2001.

All Afghan children are legally required to complete class nine. In 2017, Human Rights Watch reported that the Afghan government was unable to provide a system to ensure all children received this level of education and, in practice, many children missed out. In 2018, UNICEF reported that 3.7 million children between the ages of 7 and 17, or 44 percent, were not attending school.

As of 2017, the Afghan government cooperated with Taliban forces to provide education services: in Khogyani District, the government is given "nominal control" by local Taliban fighters in return for paying the wages of teachers whom the Taliban appoint in local schools.

== Women's rights ==
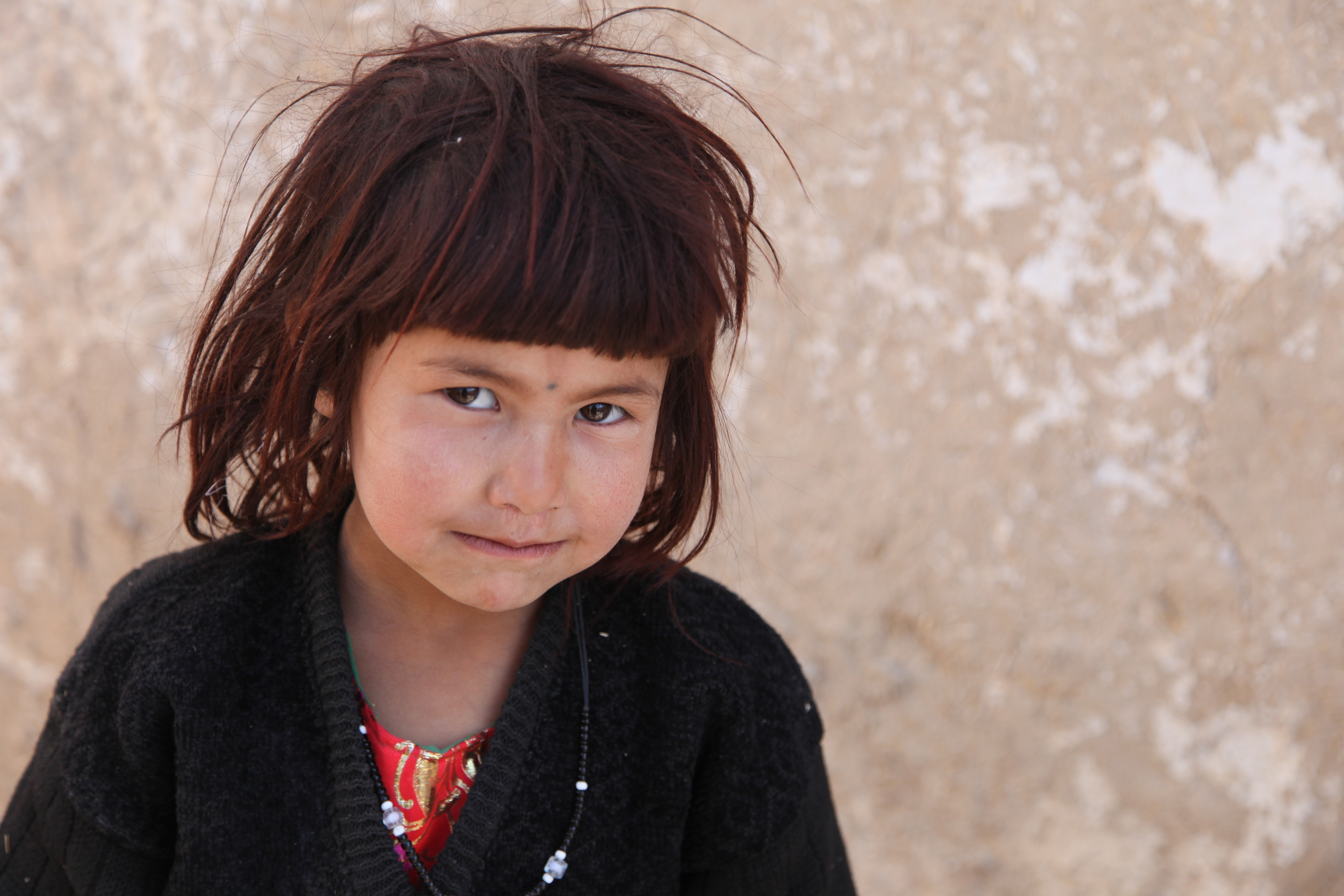
A young Afghan girl in Qalat pictured by the 116th Infantry Battalion before receiving school supplies in 2011

Prior to the beginning of conflict in 1978, there had been some strides in women's rights in cities, but Afghanistan remained much more conservative than even its neighboring countries. Pashtun areas emphasized tribal honor, which meant that women generally wore full cover light blue burqas. In the most rural areas however, women generally did not wear burqas due to the hard labor of farming.

As of 2013, 3.2 million girls attended school, up fewer than 50,000 in 2001. 39% of girls were attending school in 2017 compared to 6% in 2003. In 2021, a third of students at university were women and 27% of members of parliament were women. While the Taliban typically opposed girls' education, in 2017 in Khogyani District it allowed girls to receive education in order to improve its standing among local residents. In 2018, UNICEF reported that in some provinces such as Kandahar, Helmand, Wardak, Paktika, Zabul and Uruzgan, 85 percent of girls were not going to school.

== Environmental ==
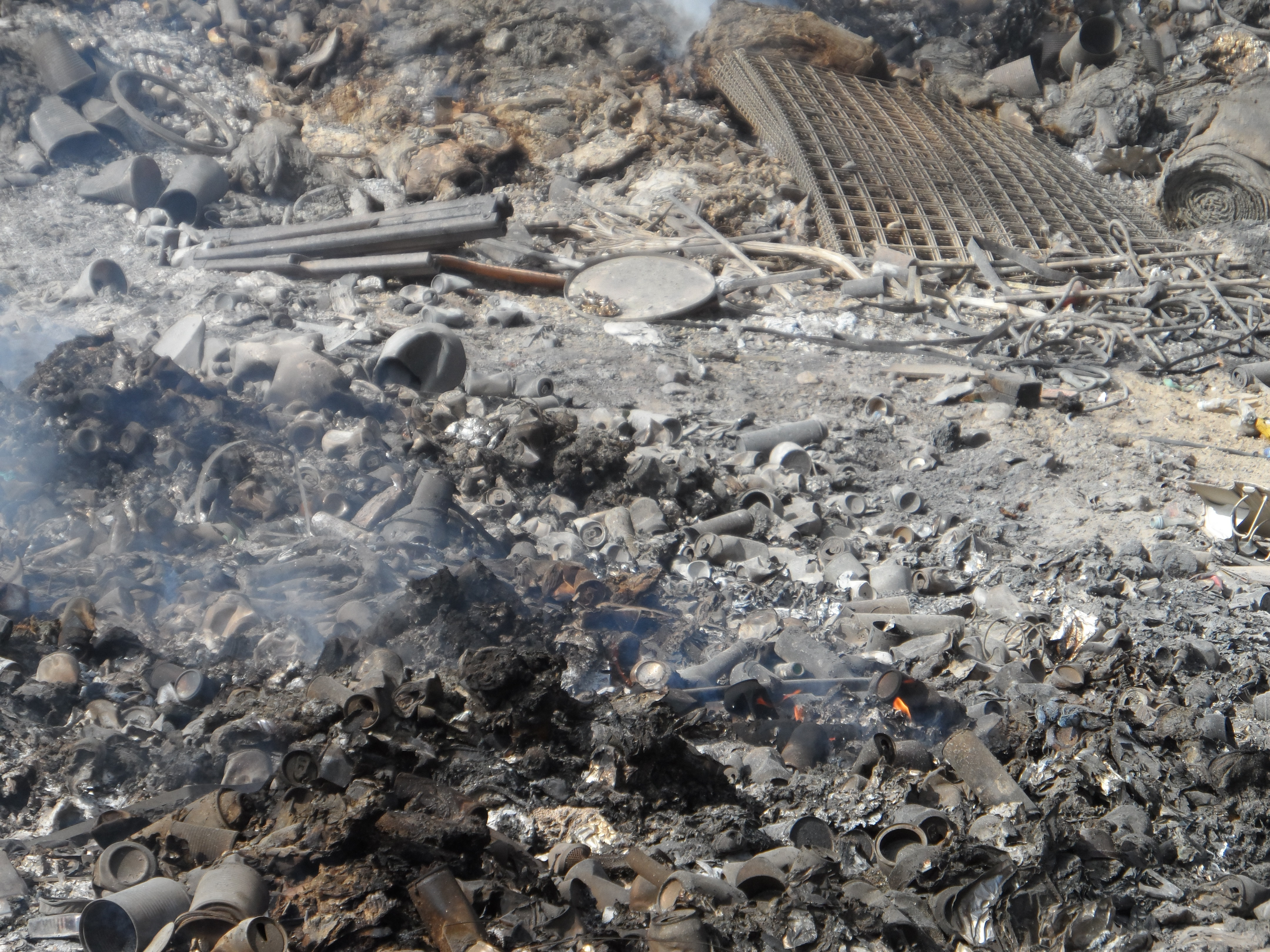
Open-air burn pit at Forward Operating Base Sharana, Paktika, Afghanistan, in 2013

The ongoing environmental impacts of war in Afghanistan, from the 1979 beginning of the Soviet-Afghan War to the 2021 United States' withdrawal from Afghanistan, adversely affect the health of Afghan civilians and American veterans, infrastructure, the labour force, and social structures. Environmental impacts involve but are not limited to the open-air burn pits of the United States Department of Defense (DoD) and the degradation of traditional irrigation systems. The burn pits produced hazardous emissions inconclusively linked to later appearances of chronic and sometimes fatal illness. Irrigation impacts—significant due to the dryness of the land—have been catalyzed by military activity and the societal effects of conflict; they have contributed to the rise of Afghan opium production.
