= Remittance =

Money transfer by a foreign worker to their home country

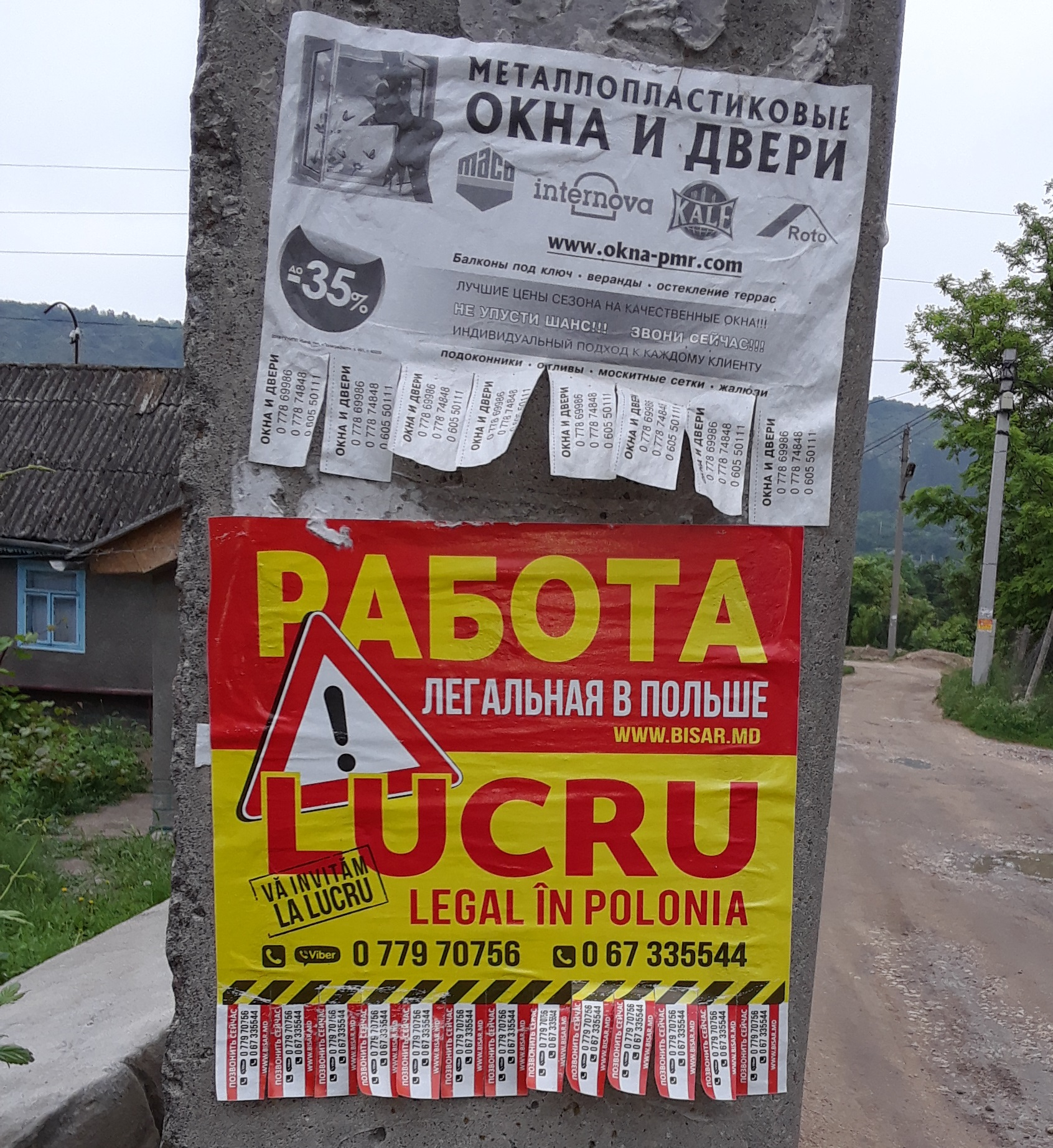
"Work in Poland legally" street advertisement in Transnistria

A remittance is a non-commercial transfer of money by a foreign worker, a member of a diaspora community, or a citizen with familial ties abroad, for household income in their home country or homeland.

Money sent home by migrants competes with international aid as one of the largest financial inflows to developing countries. Remittance is more than three times as large as the total global foreign aid. In 2021, $780 billion was sent to 800 million people, while foreign aid totalled $200 billion. Most remittance flows from high-income countries to lower-income countries. Workers' remittances are a significant part of international capital flows, especially with regard to labor-exporting countries.

A substantial share of remittance ends up in the hands of banks and money-transfer companies due to fees imposed on money transfers. Governments can play a vital role in enabling migrants to support their families more effectively by implementing measures that help reduce transaction costs.

Research suggests that remittances are primarily motivated by altruism, self-interest in exchange, and repayment of past expense. A mix of motivations may coexist, in scientific literature this state of mind is summarized as "tempered altruism and enlightened selfishness".

Scholars have linked remittance flows to improved health and education incomes in low-income countries, as the money provides access to food, medicine, health treatments, and education.

== Global extent ==
Money sent or brought back by migrants as a share of GDP

Remittance has been defined by the World Bank as the part of the earnings which a migrant worker sends back to family members in the country of origin. Worldwide, the flow of remittance has increased from US$72.3 billion in 2001 to approximately US$483 billion in 2011. According to the World Bank, in 2018 overall global remittance grew 10% to US$689 billion, including US$528 billion in 2019 to developing countries. Overall global remittance was expected to grow 3.7% to US$715 billion in 2019, including US$549 billion to developing nations. According to the World Bank, remittance flows to low- and middle-income countries grew by about five percent in 2022, reaching US$626 billion.

Remittances make up a significant portion of economies of developing countries. Many receive over 10% of their gross domestic product (GDP) in remittances each year, with some exceptional cases as high as a third of their GDP.

International remittances have a major impact on developing countries around the world because the majority of remittances, some $441 billion in 2015, goes to developing economies. This amount is nearly triple the $131 billion of global Official Development Assistance.

=== Top recipient countries ===
Top recipient countries of remittances (in billions of US dollars)
| Country | 2014 | 2015 | 2016 | 2017 | 2018 | 2019 | 2020 | 2021 | 2022 | % of GDP (2023 est.) |
|---|---|---|---|---|---|---|---|---|---|---|
| India | 70.4 | 68.9 | 62.7 | 69.0 | 78.8 | 83.3 | 83.1 | 89.4 | 111.2 | 3.4% |
| Mexico | 24.8 | 26.2 | 28.7 | 32.3 | 35.8 | 39.0 | 42.9 | 54.1 | 61.1 | 3.7% |
| China | 62.3 | 63.9 | 61.0 | 63.9 | 67.4 | 68.4 | 59.5 | 53.0 | 51.0 | 0.3% |
| Philippines | 28.7 | 29.8 | 31.1 | 32.8 | 33.8 | 35.2 | 34.9 | 36.7 | 38.0 | 9.2% |
| France | 25.4 | 24.1 | 24.0 | 24.9 | 26.2 | 30.0 | 28.8 | 32.8 | 33.9 | 1.1% |
| Pakistan | 17.2 | 19.3 | 19.8 | 19.9 | 21.2 | 22.3 | 26.1 | 31.3 | 29.9 | 7.0% |
| Egypt | 19.6 | 18.3 | 18.6 | 24.7 | 25.5 | 26.8 | 29.6 | 31.5 | 28.3 | 6.1% |
| Bangladesh | 15.0 | 15.3 | 13.6 | 13.5 | 15.6 | 18.4 | 21.8 | 22.2 | 21.5 | 5.2% |
| Nigeria | 21.0 | 20.6 | 19.7 | 22.0 | 24.3 | 23.8 | 17.2 | 19.5 | 20.1 | 5.3% |
| Germany | 17.0 | 15.6 | 15.2 | 17.7 | 18.9 | 18.3 | 19.3 | 20.8 | 19.3 | 0.4% |
| Guatemala | 5.8 | 6.5 | 7.4 | 8.4 | 9.4 | 10.7 | 11.4 | 15.4 | 18.2 | 19.3% |
| Ukraine | 7.4 | 8.5 | 9.5 | 12.1 | 14.7 | 15.8 | 15.2 | 18.1 | 16.8 | 9.1% |
| Uzbekistan | 6.8 | 4.8 | 5.8 | 7.1 | 7.6 | 8.5 | 7.1 | 9.3 | 16.7 | 17.8% |
| Belgium | 12.2 | 10.5 | 10.8 | 11.4 | 12.4 | 12.3 | 12.9 | 13.7 | 13.4 | 2.1% |
| Vietnam | 9.8 | 8.1 | 8.6 | 9.4 | 10.2 | 10.9 | 10.7 | 12.7 | 13.2 | 3.2% |

== Major operators ==
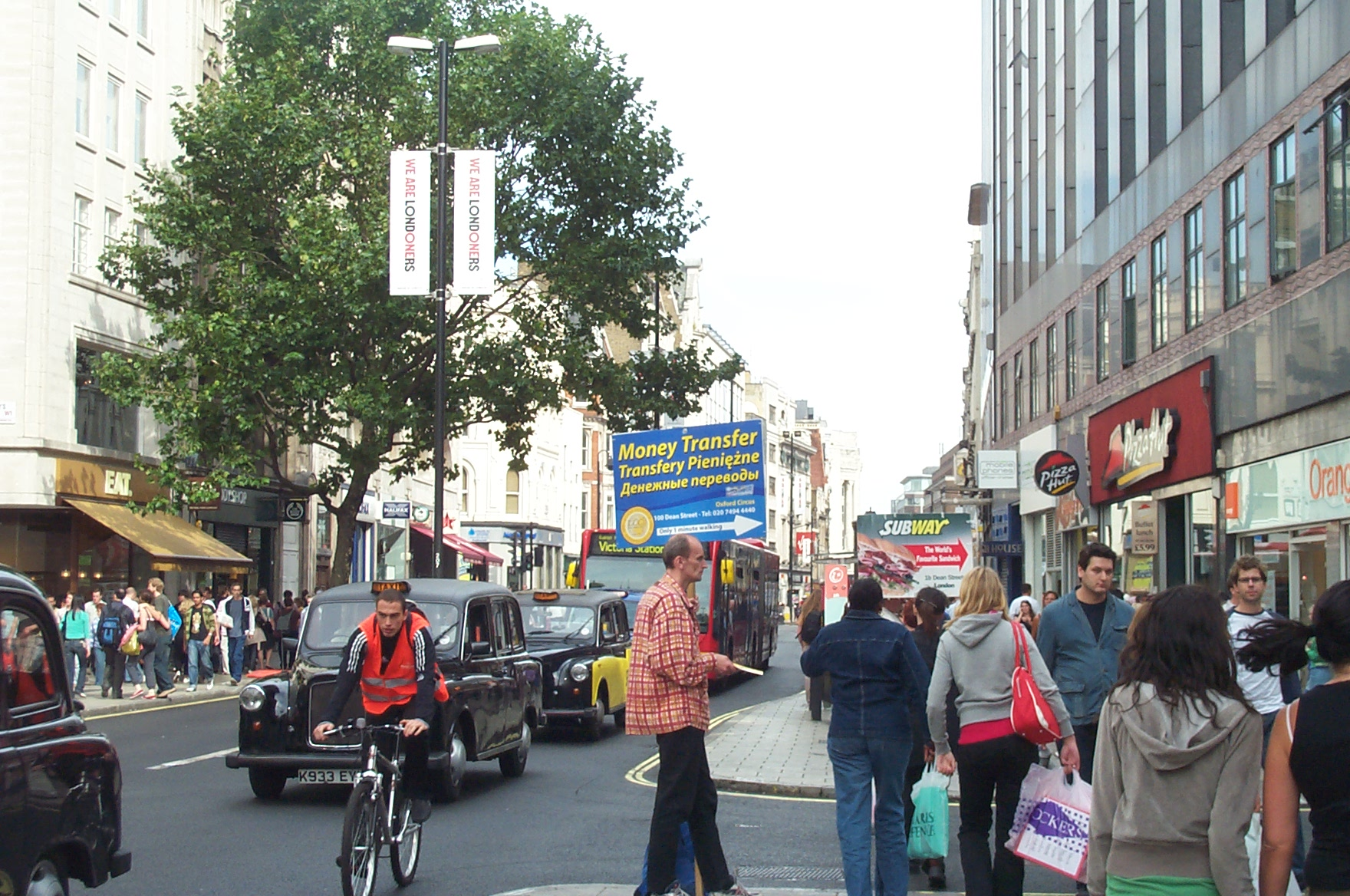
International money transfer ad in London, with texts in Polish and Russian

The licensed money transmitter Western Union allows customers to designate a recipient who can pick up that money directly at any Western Union or from a Western Union affiliated agent. Western Union also operates as bureau de change with a fee ranging from eight to twelve percent. Western Union is the world's leading handler of remittance and the 170,000 Western Union agents handle about 25 percent of the total global remittance traffic.

Other companies such as MoneyGram have also been a key player for decades. Pure play money transfer providers may be owned by parent companies with more diverse interests. Two players dominate the international electronic funds transfer for interbank payments between two bank accounts. These are the Clearing House Interbank Payments System (CHIPS) and the Society for Worldwide Interbank Financial Telecommunication (SWIFT). Businesses as well as banks can subscribe to the international communications network Telex and initiate international financial transfers.

Although the remittance market share diversified when fintech startups entered the market in the 2010s, Western Union continues to dominate the majority of the remittance market share. Since the advent of fintech, many digital remittances have emerged on the scene, leading to the rise of comparison platforms or aggregators such as FXcompared and Monito in Europe and in Southeast Asia.

== Effects ==
=== Economic effects on developing countries ===
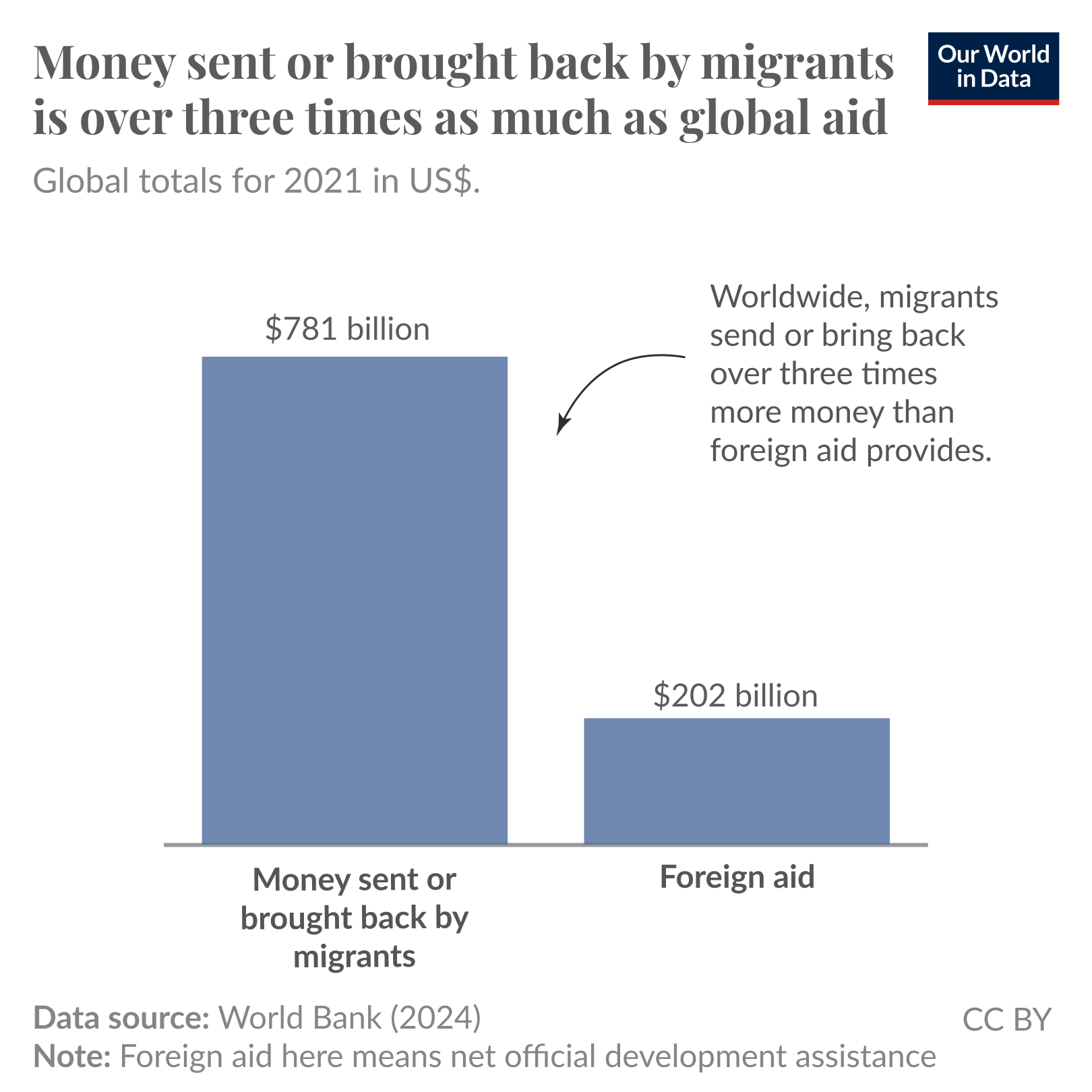
The amount of money sent or brought back by migrants was more than three times larger than foreign aid in 2021.

The extent to which remittances produce benefits for developing countries is argued.

World Bank economists contend that remittance receivers' higher propensity to own a bank account means that remittances can promote access to financial services for the sender and recipient, claimed to be an essential aspect of leveraging remittances to promote economic development. For example, in Armenia, which has a high remittance to GDP ratio (7−8%), studies suggest that those households which receive remittances have a higher propensity to save, however, as opposed to some theoretic frameworks, these savings are not used to leverage borrowing more from the financial system as a way to grow their businesses. Other studies suggest that another channel through which remittances can foster economic growth is a household investment. For instance, the study conducted in South Caucasus reveals that in Armenia having a migrant household member is associated with a higher probability of establishing a family business by that household. Thus, the remittances sent by migrants can potentially encourage domestic investment, ensuring economic growth. However, new findings for Armenia suggest that remittances help potential migrants to ease the migration process, serving as a resource rather than as a contractual tool between migrants and non-migrants. It is concluded that remittances drastically shift emigration intentions upward. The need for remittances, and the ability and the strength of the migrant social capital (or the network) are factors which jointly determine emigration intentions. Meanwhile, critical migration scholars have expressed concern about the ability of remittances to address the structural causes of economic underdevelopment and see an increasing policy emphasis on finance as symptomatic of a paradigmatic shift towards a 'self-help development' that burdens the poor.

Remittances are generally thought to be counter-cyclical. The stability of remittance flows amidst financial crises and economic downturns make them a reliable source of foreign exchange earnings for developing countries. As migrant remittances are sent cumulatively over the years and not only by new migrants, remittances are able to be persistent over time. This is particularly true of remittances sent by circular migrants, migrant workers who move back and forth between their home and host countries in a temporary and repetitive manner. At the state level, countries with diversified migration destinations are likely to have more sustainable remittance flows.

From a macroeconomic perspective, there is no conclusive relationship between remittances and GDP growth. While remittances can boost aggregate demand and thereby spur economic activity, other research indicates that remittances may also have adverse macroeconomic impacts by increasing income inequality and reducing labour supply among recipient countries.

=== Role in emergencies ===
During disasters or emergencies, remittances can be a vital source of income for people whose other forms of livelihood may have been destroyed by conflict or natural disaster. According to the Overseas Development Institute, this is being increasingly recognized as important by aid actors who are considering better ways of supporting people in emergency responses. Refugees and other displaced populations also often remit to family members left behind in conflict areas.

== Regulation and security concerns ==
The recent internationally coordinated effort to stifle possible sources of money laundering and/or terrorist financing has increased the cost of sending remittances, directly increasing costs to the companies facilitating the sending, and indirectly increasing the costs to the person remitting. In some corridors a sizeable amount of remittances is sent through informal channels (family connections, traveling friends, local money lenders, etc.). According to the World Bank, some countries do not report remittances data.

Moreover, when data is available, the methodologies used by countries for remittance data compilation are not publicly available. A 2010 world survey of central banks found significant differences in the quality of remittance data collection across countries: some central banks only used remittances data reported from commercial banks, neglecting to account for remittance flows via money transfer operators and post offices.

Remittances can be difficult to track and potentially sensitive to money laundering (AML) and terror financing (CTF) concerns. Since the 9/11 attack many governments and the Financial Action Task Force (FATF) have taken steps to address informal value transfer systems. Nations often complete this goal through the use of Financial Intelligence Units (FIUs). The principal legislative initiatives in this area are the USA PATRIOT Act, Title III in the United States and, in the EU, through a series of EU Money Laundering Directives. Though no serious terror risk should be associated with migrants sending money to their families, misuse of the financial system remains a serious government concern.

The World Bank and the Bank for International Settlements have developed international standards for remittance services.

== History ==
Several European countries, for example, Spain, Italy, and Ireland, were heavily dependent on remittances received from their emigrants during the 19th and 20th centuries. In the case of Spain, remittances amounted to 21% of all of its current account income in 1946. All of those countries created policies on remittances developed after significant research efforts in the field. For instance, Italy was the first country in the world to enact a law to protect remittances in 1901 while Spain was the first country to sign an international treaty with Argentina in 1960 to lower the cost of the remittances received.

=== 21st century ===
Since 2000, remittances have increased sharply worldwide, having almost tripled to $529 billion in 2012. In 2012, migrants from India and China alone sent more than $130 billion to their home countries.

In 2004 the G8 met at the Sea Island Summit and decided to take action to lower the costs for migrant workers who send money back to their friends and families in their country of origin. In light of this, various G8 government developmental organizations, such as the UK government's Department for International Development (DFID) and the United States Agency for International Development (USAID) began to look into ways in which the cost of remitting money could be lowered.

The 2008 financial crisis was triggered in the United States and rippled through the financial system in developed countries. Despite this, throughout the 2008 financial crisis, remittance was among the less volatile sources of foreign exchange for developing countries. In financial literature, remittance sent by migrant workers to households in the country of origin, is regarded as countercyclical when the economy is struck by hardship such as a financial crisis, a natural disaster, or political instability. In 2009 remittance payments to developing countries declined globally for the first time in recorded history of the global financial system. But with a decline of only 5.2 percent in 2009, remittance was significantly less precarious than private capital flows including foreign direct investment.

In September 2008, the World Bank established the first international database of remittance prices. The Remittance Prices Worldwide Database provides data on sending and receiving remittances for over 200 "country corridors" worldwide. The "corridors" examined include remittance flows from 32 major sending countries to 89 receiving countries, which account for more than 60% of total remittances to developing countries. The resulting publication of the Remittance Prices Worldwide Database serves four major purposes: benchmarking improvements, allowing comparisons across countries, supporting consumers' choices, and putting pressure on service providers to improve their services. The World Bank's Remittance Prices Worldwide database reported that the global average cost of sending US$200 was 6.36 percent of the amount sent in the third quarter of 2025. Its digital remittance index averaged 4.59 percent for the same quarter, 1.77 percentage points below the overall global average.

At the July 2009 summit in L'Aquila, Italy, G8 heads of government and states endorsed the objective of reducing the cost of remittance services by five percentage points in five years. To drive down costs, the World Bank has begun certifying regional and national databases that use a consistent methodology to compare the cost of sending remittances.

At the G20 2011 Summit in Cannes, Bill Gates stated that, "If the transaction costs on remittances worldwide were cut from where they are today at around 10% to an average of 5% it would unlock $15bn a year in poor countries." A number of low-cost online services have emerged with the objective of lowering the cost of money transfers to developing and emerging economies. There are also a number of comparison sites when it comes to remittance which breaks down the costs of sending money overseas.

According to the World Bank remittance to low- and middle-income countries reached $529 billion in 2018, which was a record high.

== By region ==
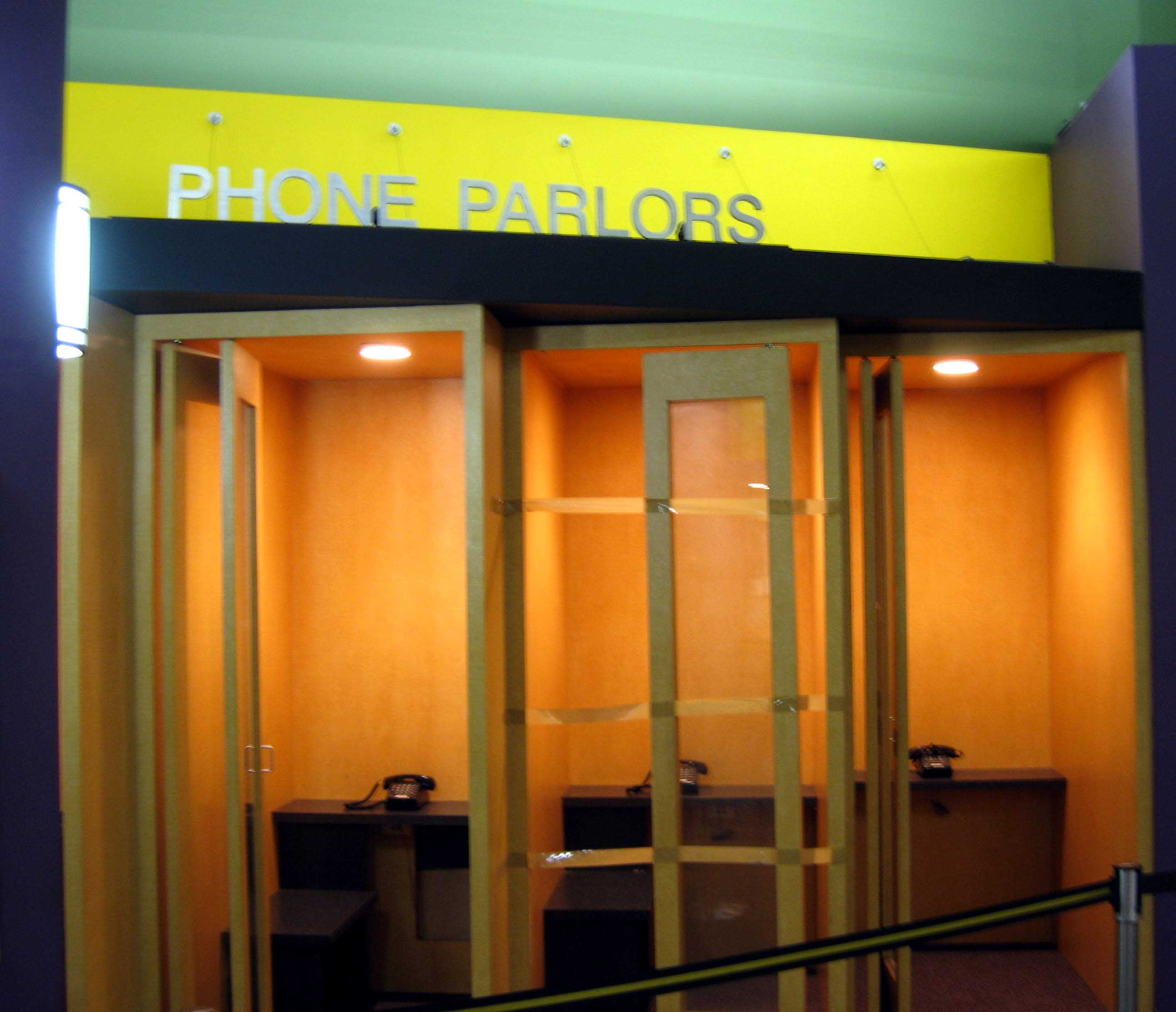
Western Union phone parlors near Times Square, 2008

The United States has been the leading source of remittances globally every year since the early 1980s. United Arab Emirates, Saudi Arabia, and Switzerland have been the next largest senders of remittances since 2015. Between 9 million and 11 million workers send remittances from Russia each year.

=== Asia ===
A majority of the remittances have been directed to Asian countries like India (approx. US$87.0 billion in 2021), China (approx. US$60.0 billion in 2021), the Philippines (approx. US$33.5 billion in 2020), Pakistan (US$26.0 billion in 2020), Bangladesh (US$21.5 billion in 2020) and more. Asian countries such as Tajikistan and Nepal are among the countries that rely the most on remittances, accounting for 35% and 25% of their GDP respectively.

Traditionally, most of the remittances happen through the conventional channel of official agents. However, with the increasing relevance and reach of the Internet, online and mobile phone money transfers have grown significantly.

In 2024, Australia saw a record $38.2 billion sent in remittances. India saw $7.3 billion, China saw $5.35 billion.

==== Armenia ====
Remittances are a major component of the Armenian economy. making up about 13% of Armenia's GDP in 2011. In 2013 around 40% of families of Armenia have received remittances. As a result, Armenia falls in the top 20 countries worldwide for receiving remittances. Total remittances to Armenia have reached their peak in 2013 being equal to $2.192 billion but plummeted after the 2014 Russian ruble devaluation and the Russian financial crisis (2014–2016) and reached $1.528 billion in 2019.

Armenia falls in the top 20 countries worldwide for receiving remittances. Armenia, being a country with one of the largest diasporas in the world, provides a case study of a developing economy that is dependent on remittances and the financial support they provide. Total remittances to Armenia reached $1.87 billion in 2013, a 10.8%. A study conducted in 2004 examined the impact of remittances from a microeconomics perspective, and determined that households with average income were the most likely to have a family member abroad because poorer households lacked the financial ability to send family members out of the country and the most wealthy households did not have a reason to.

In 2017, the majority of remittance flows to Armenia originated from Russia, about 60.5% of overall remittances. The figure amounted to nearly $945 million due to more than 2 million Armenians living in Russia. The next biggest inflows were recorded from the U.S. (with around 500,000-1,000,000 Armenians), at over $160 million, which is 10.25% of the overall figure. According to the International Monetary Fund, starting from 2010 remittances in U.S. dollars, Armenian drams, and rubles, grew until they hit their peak in 2014 and started declining after that in a volatile fashion as a result of the Russian ruble devaluation. Remittances in drams and dollars declined to almost their 2010 levels.

==== Bangladesh ====
An estimated 10 million Bangladeshis, working abroad have sent $15 billion to home in 2018 and $18.32 billion in 2019. It is the country's second-largest source of foreign earnings after its gigantic textile industry. Bangladesh is one of the top 10 countries in the world for migration and remittance according to World Bank. Most of the remittances come from gulf countries.

==== India ====
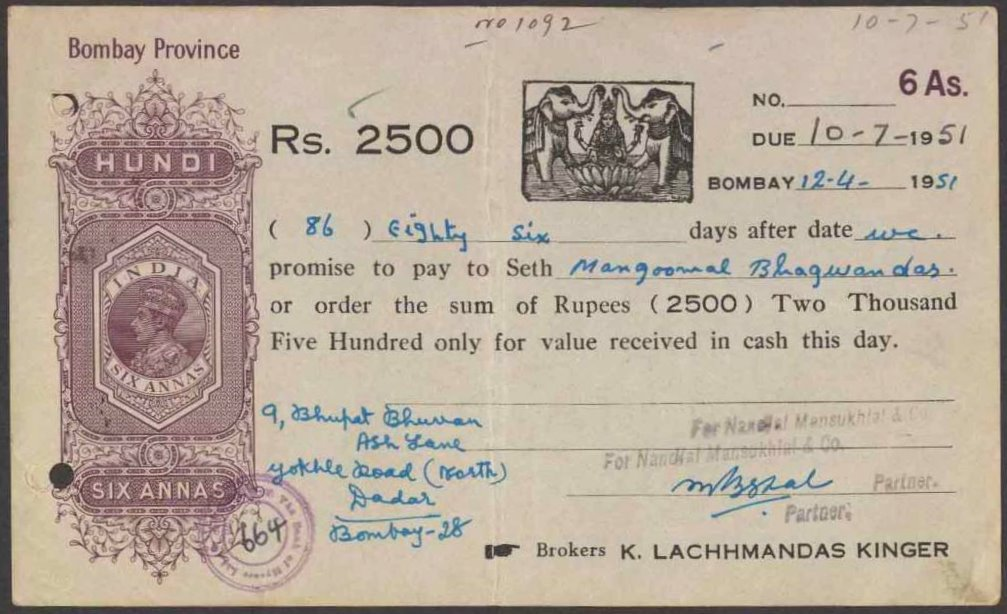
Medieval Hundi is Indian-origin remittance system. A hundi for Rs 2500 of 1951 stamped in the Bombay Province with a pre-printed revenue stamp.

India is the world's top receiver of remittances, claiming more than 12% of the world's remittances in 2015. Indians living overseas are the world's largest diaspora. As per the Ministry of Overseas Indian Affairs (MOIA), remittance is received from the approximately 35 million members of the Indian diaspora. Remittances to India stood at US$68.968 billion in 2017 and outward remittances from India to other countries totalled US$5.710 billion, for a net inflow of US$63.258 billion in 2017.

==== Jordan ====
The flow of remittances to Jordan experienced rapid growth during the 1970s and 1980s when Jordan started exporting skilled labor to the Persian Gulf. These remittances represent an important source of funding for many developing countries, including Jordan. According to the World Bank data on remittances, with about US$3 billion in 2010 Jordan ranked at 10th place among all developing countries. Jordan ranked among the top 20 recipients of remittances for the preceding decade. In addition, the Arab Monetary Fund (AMF) statistics in 2010 indicate that Jordan was the third biggest recipient of remittances among Arab countries after Egypt and Lebanon. The host countries that have absorbed most of the Jordanian expatriates are Saudi Arabia and the United Arab Emirates, where the available data indicate that about 90% of Jordanian migrants are working in the Persian Gulf.

==== Philippines ====
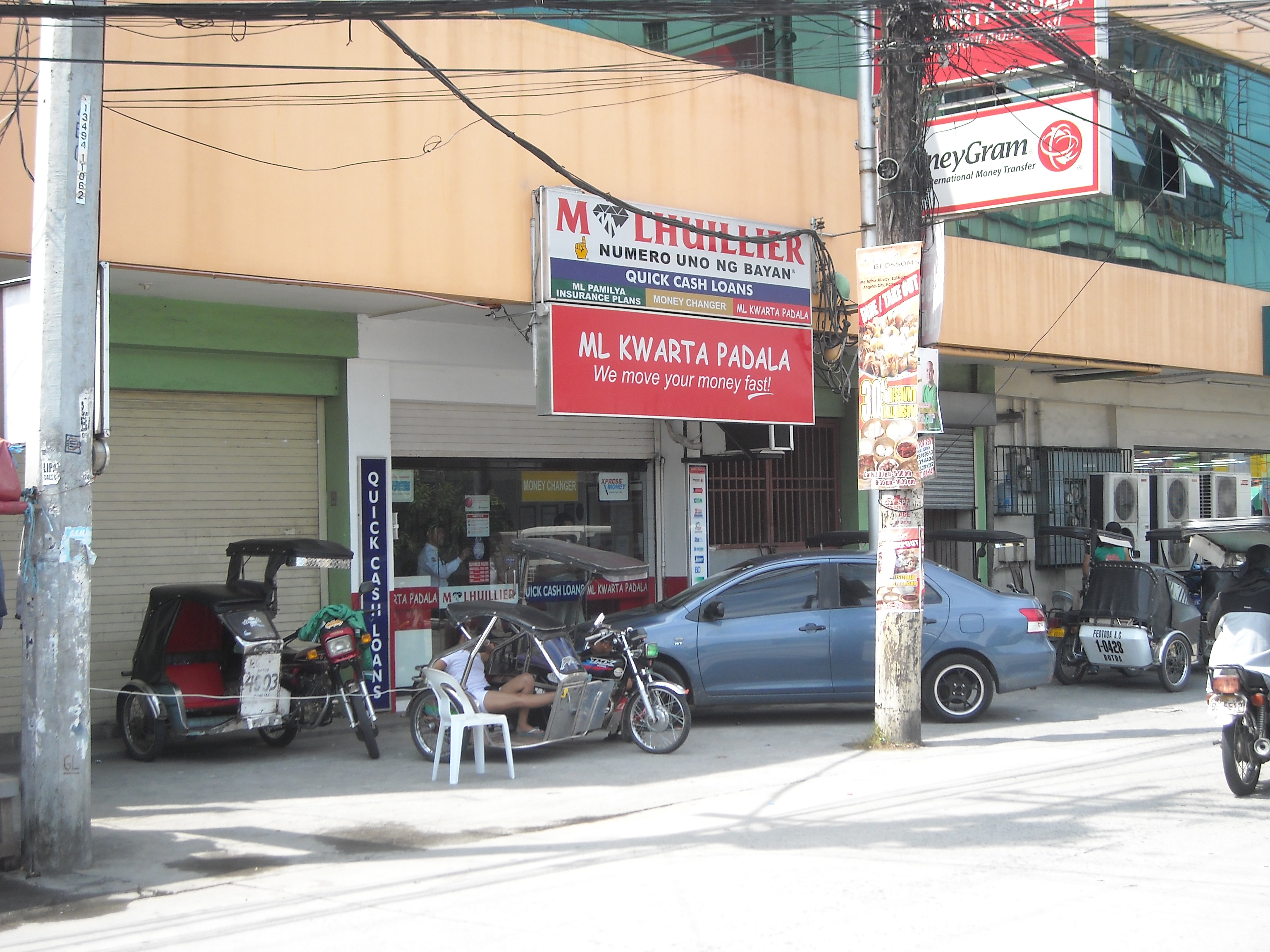
Pawnshops are a common place to send and receive remittance in the Philippines.

According to a World Bank study, the Philippines is the second largest recipient for remittances in Asia. It was estimated in 1994 that Overseas Filipino Workers (OFWs) sent over US$2.6 billion back to the Philippines through formal banking systems. With the addition of money sent through private finance companies and return migrants, the 1994 total was closer to US$6 billion annually.

The total is estimated to have grown by 7.8 percent annually to reach US$21.3 billion in 2010. Remittances are a reliable source of revenue for the Philippines, accounting for 8.9 per cent of the country's GDP.

The Estrada administration in 2000 declared it "The Year of Overseas Filipino Worker in the Recognition of the Determination and Supreme Self-Sacrifice of Overseas Filipino Workers." This declaration connects monetary remittances of overseas workers as the top foreign-exchange earnings in the Philippines.

==== Tajikistan ====
In 2024, remittance made up 48% of Tajikistan's GDP. Most of the remittance comes from Tajik labor migrants in Russia.

==== Turkey ====
Since the 2000s remittances from Turkey has been increasing, reaching US$1.49 billion in 2021 according to the World Bank. Although remittances to Turkey had been a significant part of the economy in the past, since the 2000s they only represent a fraction of the Turkish economy with 0.1% of the total GDP.

Since the Syrian civil war the foreign-born population of Turkey has been growing. It was reported that Syrians in Turkey were using the "hawala system" to send money to their country of origin. According to economist Gözde Güran remittances sent through hawala has become an integral part of the Syrian economy.

=== Latin America and the Caribbean ===
In Latin America and the Caribbean, remittances play an important role in the economy of the region, totaling over US$66.5 billion in 2007, with about 75% originating in the United States. This total represents more than the sum of Foreign direct investment and official development aid combined. In seven Latin American and Caribbean countries, remittances even account for more than 10% of GDP and exceed the dollar flows of the largest export product in almost every country in the region.

Percentages ranged from 2% in Mexico, to 18% in El Salvador, 21% in Honduras, and up to 30% in Haiti. The Inter-American Development Bank's Multilateral Investment Fund (IDB-MIF) has been the leading agency on regional remittance research.

Mexico received remittance inflows of almost US$24 billion in 2007, 95% of which originated in the US.

=== North America ===
==== United States ====
A 2004 study found that over 60% of the 16.5 million Latin American-born adults who resided in the United States at the time of the survey regularly sent money home. The remittances sent by these 10 million immigrants were transmitted via more than 100 million individual transactions per year and amounted to an estimated $30 billion during 2004. Each transaction averaged about $150–$250, and, because these migrants tended to send smaller amounts more frequently than others, their remittances had a higher percentage of costs due to transfer fees.

Migrants sent approximately 10% of their household incomes; these remittances made up a corresponding 50–80% of the household incomes for the recipients. Significant amounts of remittances were sent from 37 U.S. states, but six states were identified as the "traditional sending" states: New York (which led the group with 81% of its immigrants making regular remittances), California, Texas, Florida, Illinois, and New Jersey. According to Mexico's central bank, remittances grew just 0.6 during the first six months of 2007, as compared to 23% during the same period in 2006. Experts attribute the slowdown to a contraction in the U.S. construction industry, tighter border controls, and a crackdown in the U.S. on illegal immigration.

Remittance culture in the United States has contributed to the formation of "micro-geographies", tightly knit networks that integrate U.S. communities with communities throughout Latin America, such as migrants from Oaxaca, Mexico, who have settled in Venice Beach, California. Oaxacans not only send money back to their communities, but they also travel back and forth extensively.

After the Great Recession, remittances from the United States to Latin America have been on the decline. While there were US$69.2 billion worth of remittances sent in 2008, that figure has fallen to $58.9 billion for 2011. This trend is a result of many factors including the recession itself, more economic opportunity in Latin American countries, and rising fees charged by coyotes to smuggle immigrants across the border.

The pattern of migration has changed from a circular flow, in which immigrants work in the United States for a few years before returning to their families in their home countries, to a one-way stream whereby migrants find themselves stuck in the United States. As a result, the new wave of migrants is both less likely to leave and more likely to stay in the United States for longer periods of time. Overall, this trend has contributed to falling levels of remittances sent to Latin American countries from the United States.

=== Africa ===
Remittances to countries in Africa play an important role in many African nations' economies. However, little data exists as many rely on informal channels to send money home. The number of immigrants from Africa today is approximately 20 to 30 million adults, who send around US$40 billion annually to their families and local communities back home. For the region as a whole, this represents 50 percent more than net official development assistance (ODA) from all sources, and, for most countries, the amount also exceeds foreign direct investment (FDI). In several fragile states, remittances are estimated to exceed 50 percent of GDP.

Most African countries restrict the payment of remittances to banks, which in turn, typically enter into exclusive arrangements with large money transfer companies, like Western Union or Money Gram, to operate on their behalf. This results in limited competition and limited access for consumers, which allows these Money Transfer Operators (MTOs) to charge the highest fees for remittances in the world. However, there are a number of new players aiming to disrupt this established MTO model, such as Xoom and Willstream, which leverage increasing mobile phone penetration in the region and provide different rate structures to diaspora customers. Additionally, global initiative like the United Nations Sustainable Development Goal 10 has a target of reducing the transaction costs of migrant remittances to less than 3 percent by 2030.

According to a World Bank study, Nigeria is by far the top remittance recipient in Africa, accounting for $10 billion in 2010, a slight increase over the previous year ($9.6 billion). Other top recipients include Sudan ($3.2 billion), Kenya ($1.8 billion), Senegal ($1.2 billion), South Africa ($1.0 billion), Uganda ($0.8 billion), Lesotho ($0.5 billion), Ethiopia ($387 million), Mali ($385 million), and Togo ($302 million). As a share of Gross Domestic Product, the top recipients in 2009 were: Lesotho (25%), Togo (10%), Cape Verde (9%), Guinea-Bissau (9%), Senegal (9%), Gambia (8%), Liberia (6%), Sudan (6%), Nigeria (6%), and Kenya (5%).

==== Nigeria ====
A major source of foreign-exchange earnings for Nigeria are remittances sent home by Nigerians living abroad. In 2014, 17.5 million Nigerians lived in foreign countries, with the UK and the US having more than 2 million Nigerians each.

According to the International Organization for Migration, Nigeria witnessed a dramatic increase in remittances sent home from overseas Nigerians, going from US$2.3 billion in 2004 to 17.9 billion in 2007, representing 6.7% of GDP. In 2016, remittances reached a new record of $35 billion. The United States accounts for the largest portion of official remittances, followed by the United Kingdom, Italy, Canada, Spain and France. On the African continent, Egypt, Equatorial Guinea, Chad, Libya, and South Africa are important source countries of remittance flows to Nigeria, while China is the biggest remittance-sending country in Asia.

An August 2016 Nigerian Central Bank (NCB) decision to suspend the operations of all MTOs in the country, except those of Western Union, MoneyGram and Rio, was met with a strong backlash. It was argued that the decision was not appropriately justified, while also standing in contrast to the NCB's previous move to ban all exclusivity agreements with Western Union. The decision was considered to disproportionately strengthen the dominant position of Western Union, MoneyGram and Rio. Under pressure, however, the NCB reversed the decision and granted new licenses to a number of competing MTOs.

==== Somalia ====
Somali expatriates often send remittances to their relatives in Greater Somalia through Dahabshiil and other Somali-owned money transfer companies. In order to ensure that these funds go to their intended recipients rather than the terrorist organization Al-Shabaab and other militant groups, the governments of the United States, Australia, and a number of other Western countries tightened their banking requirements or stopped processing altogether the remittances. To address the concerns, the United States Congress passed the Money Remittances Improvement Act of 2014.

In April 2015, the Federal Cabinet of Somalia also officially launched the Special Task Force on Remittances (STFR). The multi-agency initiative is mandated with facilitating the Federal Government of Somalia's new national policy pertaining to the money transfer industry. Its main priority is centered on establishing a comprehensive strategy and a consultative implementation plan for the formalization of the local financial sector. Additionally, the STFR is tasked with helping to foster a business environment and financial infrastructure conducive to growth. It is also empowered to coordinate and speed up the endorsement of financial governance instruments and transparency associated legislation, such as the laws on Anti-Money Laundering (AML) and Counter Financing of Terrorism (CFT). In accordance with the Financial Action Task Force (FATF)'s recommendations, the STFR is in turn slated to oversee the Somali federal government's campaign to ratify various international treaties. The Task Forces' membership is scheduled to be announced shortly, and will be drawn from government institutions, the remittance industry, banks, and other key private sector stakeholders.

==== France ====
In 2021, total transfers from France to African countries, according to the World Bank, reached nearly $9 billion.

== See also ==
- Hawala
- Money services business
- Money transmitter
- Black tax
