= Foreign aid to Afghanistan =

Foreign aid to Afghanistan has been significant even since the Taliban took charge of the country in August 2021.

== History ==
Following the 2001 US invasion of Afghanistan, large amounts aid came in to Afghanistan to facilitate state-building of the nascent Islamic Republic of Afghanistan. A side effect of this aid was increased corruption among government officials. The peak of American aid to Afghanistan of $15.3 billion occurred in 2011.

After the Taliban's takeover of Afghanistan in 2021 many countries refused to recognise the new government, affecting the operation of aid agencies due to aid typically being subject to intergovernmental agreements. In light of this aid agencies tended to avoid collaborating with the Taliban. In 2022 the Taliban banned women from working for NGOs, and for UN agencies in 2023, resulting in around 150 NGOs and aid organisations partly or wholly suspending services. On the other hand, better security in the country following the Taliban's takeover helped movement of aid workers.

In February 2025, the US suspended all aid to Afghanistan, cutting off an estimated $1.7 billion for 2025. According to Euronews this caused around 50 aid organisations to partly or wholly suspend services.

== United Nations agencies ==
World Food Program gave the largest UN aid to Afghanistan which amounted to $280,000,000 in fiscal year 2024. Other UN agencies gave lesser amounts.

According to a March 2024 publication by ProPublica based on a SIGAR report, the U.N. handed over $2.9 billion in cash to Afghanistan since the Taliban arrived at the helm in August 2021. The Central Bank of Afghanistan took in the funds albeit the UNAMA has claimed such reports to be misleading after photos of boxes of cash delivered to Afghanistan became public.

== See also ==
- United Nations Assistance Mission in Afghanistan, UNAMA
