= Hawala and crime =

Uses of hawala for money laundering and terrorism

Hawala has been used for criminal activities such as money laundering and terrorism financing.

== Organizational use ==
Hezbollah has depended heavily on hawala as a means of financing. Funds have been moved from Iran to the United Arab Emirates, Turkey and Iraq. After the U.S. Treasury sanctioned Lebanese money transfers in November 2025, it was discovered that Iran had already transferred around $1billion to Hezbollah using this system.

=== United States ===
==== Post-9/11 money laundering crackdowns ====
Since hawala can be used to facilitate money laundering, avoid taxation and move wealth anonymously, the system is illegal in some U.S. states, India and Pakistan.

After the September 11 terrorist attacks, the American government suspected that some hawala brokers may have helped terrorist organizations transfer money to fund their activities, and the 9/11 Commission Report stated that "Al Qaeda frequently moved the money it raised by hawala". As a result of intense pressure from the U.S. authorities to introduce systematic anti-money laundering initiatives on a global scale, a number of hawala networks were closed down and a number of hawaladars were successfully prosecuted for money laundering. However, there is little evidence that these actions brought the authorities any closer to identifying and arresting a significant number of terrorists or drug smugglers. Experts emphasized that the overwhelming majority of those who used these informal networks were doing so for legitimate purposes, and simply chose to use a transaction medium other than state-supported banking systems. Today, the hawala system in Afghanistan is instrumental in providing financial services for the delivery of emergency relief and humanitarian and developmental aid for the majority of international and domestic NGOs, donor organizations, and development aid agencies.

In November 2001, the US administration froze the assets of Al-Barakat, a Somali remittance hawala company used primarily by a large number of Somali immigrants. Many of its agents in several countries were initially arrested, though later freed after no concrete evidence against them was found. In August 2006 the last Al-Barakat representatives were taken off the U.S. terror list, though some assets remain frozen. The mass media has speculated that pirates from Somalia use the hawala system to move funds internationally, for example into neighboring Kenya, where these transactions are neither taxed nor recorded.

In January 2010, the Kabul office of New Ansari Exchange, Afghanistan's largest hawala money transfer business, was closed following a raid by the Sensitive Investigative Unit, the country's national anti-political corruption unit, allegedly because this company was involved in laundering profits from the illicit opium trade and the moving of cash earned by government allied warlords through extortion and drug trafficking. Thousands of records were seized, from which links were found between money transfers by this company and political and business figures and NGOs in the country, including relatives of President Hamid Karzai. In August 2010, Karzai took control of the task force that staged the raid, and the US-advised anti-corruption group, the Major Crimes Task Force. He ordered a commission to review scores of past and current anti-corruption inquests.

Between October 2010 and June 2012, the U.S. government charged four Somali defendants with laundering $10,900 for al-Shabaab using hawalas. The defendants were Basaaly Saeed Moalin, Mohamed Mohamed Mohamud, Issa Doreh and Ahmed Nasir Taalil Mohamud. The indictment relied upon illegally collected metadata under the Foreign Intelligence Surveillance Act. The convictions were upheld by the U.S. 9th Circuit Court of Appeals.

=== Germany ===
In 2021, 75 tons of gold worth 1.6 billion euros was smuggled by a gang from Germany to Turkey using hawala.

=== Sweden ===
In February 2022, an exchange office on Södermalm in Stockholm has laundered money for numerous criminal networks. In total, the exchange office has laundered more than 200 million Swedish krona.

=== Pakistan ===
According to a 2023 report, 722 currency dealers in Pakistan were found to be involved in hawala and hundi operations, with the highest number based in Punjab at 205, followed by Khyber Pakhtunkhwa with 183, Sindh with 176, Balochistan with 104, and Islamabad with 17.

According to India's National Investigation Agency (NIA), The Resistance Front was funded via Hawala networks from Pakistan and Malaysia prior to the 2025 Pahalgam attack. Sajjad Ahmed Mir and Yasir Hayat allegedly raised funds through overseas networks, particularly in Malaysia. Investigators stated that Hayat, with Mir’s assistance, collected funds during multiple visits abroad and transferred about INR 9 lakh to another operative, based on evidence including suspicious communications recovered from a suspect’s mobile phone in Srinagar.
