= Hawala =

Informal currency transfer system

Hawala or hewala (Arabic: حِوالة, romanized: Ḥawāla, lit. 'transfer, trust'), originating in India as havālā (Hindi: हवाला) or huṇḍī (Hindi: हुण्डी, romanized: Huṇḍī, Sanskrit: हुण्डिका, romanized: Huṇḍikā, lit. 'bill of exchange, draft, or promissory note'), also known as ḥavâleh in Persian, and xawala or xawilaad in Somali, is a popular and informal value transfer system based on the performance and honour of a huge network of money brokers (known as hawaladars).

They operate outside of, or parallel to, traditional banking, financial channels and remittance systems. The system requires a minimum of two hawaladars that take care of the "transaction" without the movement of cash or telegraphic transfer. While hawaladars are spread throughout the world, they are primarily located in West Asia, North Africa, the Horn of Africa and the Indian subcontinent. Hawala usually follows Islamic traditions, but its use is not limited to Muslims.

== Origins ==
The hawala system originated in India. In 2003, hawala as a legal concept was documented, finding evidence of hawala reaching back to 1327, in a publication by Matthias Schramm and Markus Taube, with the title "Evolution and institutional foundation of the hawala financial system".

It has been speculated that hawala itself influenced the development of the agency in common law and in civil laws, such as the aval in French law, the aval in Portuguese law, and the avallo in Italian law. Some legal historians have suggested possible parallels between medieval European practices such as the aval and Islamic legal institutions like ḥawāla. Badr notes, however, that similarities and historical trade contacts do not in themselves demonstrate legal borrowing, and that such claims remain unproven. The transfer of debt was "not permissible under Roman law but became widely practiced in medieval Europe, especially in commercial transactions", potentially borrowing from hawala. Agency was also "an institution unknown to Roman law" as no "individual could conclude a binding contract on behalf of another as his agent". On the other hand, Islamic law and the later common law "had no difficulty in accepting agency as one of its institutions in the field of contracts and of obligations in general". The claims about the Islamic origins of hawala have later been challenged by Cinar.

== Regulation ==
Following the September 11 attacks in 2001, international organizations responsible for counterterrorism and enforcing laws against money laundering have directed their efforts on identifying problems within the hawala, as well as other remittance systems. The First International Conference on Hawala in May 2002 published the Regulatory Frameworks for Hawala and Other Remittance Systems. The International Monetary Fund (IMF) contributed a chapter, in which informal value transfer systems were considered. According to the IMF, countries with limited financial services experience macroeconomic consequences because residents rely heavily on informal fund transfer systems. Informal value transfer systems share common characteristics, including anonymity and lack of regulation or official scrutiny. Therefore informal value transfer systems may be susceptible to use by criminal organizations for money laundering and terrorist financing.

== Procedure ==
In the most basic variant of the hawala system, money is transferred via a network of hawala brokers, or hawaladars, without actually moving money. According to the author Sam Vaknin, there are large hawaladar operators with networks of middlemen in cities across many countries, but most hawaladars are small businesses who work at hawala as a sideline or moonlighting operation.

Hawala generally works as follows:

1. A customer approaches a hawala broker in one city and gives a sum of money that is to be transferred to a recipient in another, usually foreign, city. Along with the money, he usually specifies something like a password that will lead to the money being paid out.
2. The hawala broker calls another hawala broker in the recipient's city, and informs that broker about the agreed password, or gives other disposition of the funds.
3. The intended recipient, who also has been informed by the sender about the password, now approaches the broker in their city and tells him the agreed password. If the password is correct, then the broker releases the transferred sum to the receiving customer, usually minus a small commission.
4. The first broker now owes the second broker the money that has been paid out to the receiving customer; thus the second broker has to trust the first broker's promise to settle the debt at a later date.

The unique feature of the system is that no promissory instruments are exchanged between the hawala brokers: the transaction takes place entirely on the honour system. As the system does not depend on the legal enforceability of claims, it can operate even in the absence of a legal and juridical environment. Trust and extensive use of connections are the components that distinguish it from other remittance systems. Hawaladar networks are often based on membership in the same family, village, clan or ethnic group, and cheating is punished by effective excommunication and the loss of honour, which lead to severe economic hardship.

Informal records are produced of individual transactions, and a running tally of the amount owed by one broker to another is kept. Settlements of debts between hawala brokers can take a variety of forms (e.g., goods, services, properties, transfers of employees, etc.), and need not take the form of direct cash transactions.

In addition to commissions, hawala brokers often earn their profits through bypassing official exchange rates. Generally, the funds enter the system in the source country's currency and leave the system in the recipient country's currency. As settlements often take place without any foreign exchange transactions, they can be made at other than official exchange rates.

Hawala is attractive to customers because it provides a fast and convenient transfer of funds, usually with a far lower commission than that charged by banks. Its advantages are most pronounced when the receiving country applies unprofitable exchange rate regulations or when the banking system in the receiving country is less complex (e.g., due to differences in the legal environment in places such as Afghanistan, Yemen, and Somalia). Moreover, in some parts of the world, it is the only option for legitimate fund transfers. It has been used even by aid organizations in areas in which it is the best-functioning institution.

== Regional variants ==
Dubai has been a major hub for hawala transactions worldwide for decades.

=== Indian subcontinent ===
==== Hundis ====
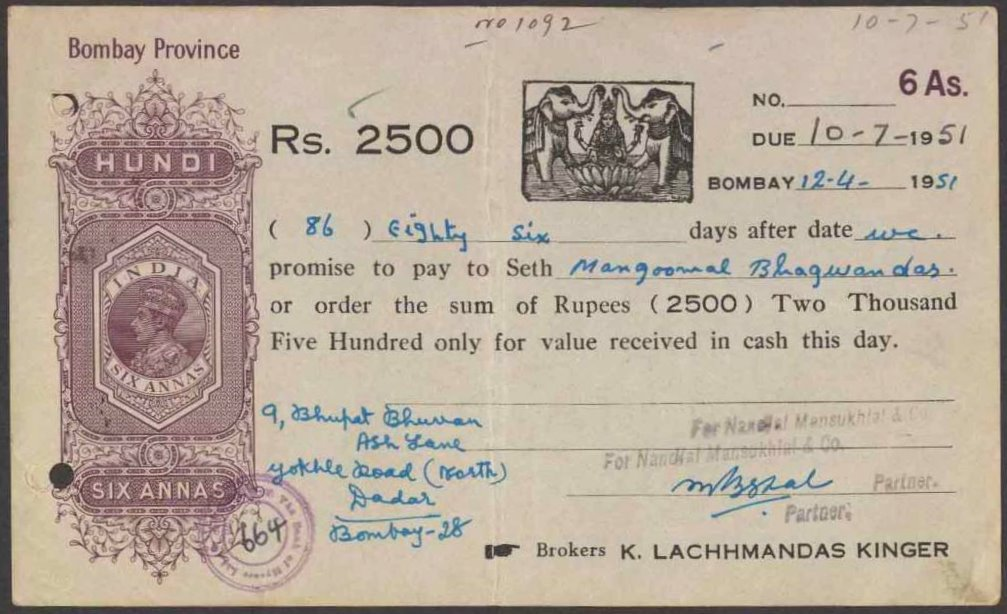
A 1951 hundi of Bombay State for ₹2500 with a pre-printed revenue stamp

The hundi is a financial instrument that developed on the Indian subcontinent for use in trade and credit transactions. Hundis are used as a form of remittance instrument to transfer money from place to place, as a form of credit instrument or IOU to borrow money and as a bill of exchange in trade transactions. The Reserve Bank of India describes the Hundi as "an unconditional order in writing made by a person directing another to pay a certain sum of money to a person named in the order".

=== Horn of Africa ===
According to the CIA, with the dissolution of Somalia's formal banking system, many informal money transfer operators arose to fill the void. It estimates that such hawaladars, xawilaad or xawala brokers are now responsible for the transfer of up to $1.6 billion per year in remittances to the country, most coming from working Somalis outside Somalia. Such funds have in turn had a stimulating effect on local business activity.

=== West Africa ===
The 2012 Tuareg rebellion left Azawad without an official money transfer service for months. The coping mechanisms that appeared were patterned on the hawala system.

== See also ==
- FATF blacklist
- Financial Action Task Force on Money Laundering (FATF)
- Hawala and crime
- Hawala scandal
- Informal value transfer system
- Global ranking of remittance by nations
- Remittances to India
- Terrorism financing
