= Physicians for Global Survival =

Physicians for Global Survival (PGS) is a physician peace-activist group that was formed in 1980 under the name Physicians for Social Responsibility. The group changed its name to the PGS in 1994. The current name of PGS is the International Physicians for the Prevention of Nuclear War Canada (IPPNWC). The organization is the Canadian affiliate of the International Physicians for the Prevention of Nuclear War (IPPNW), a non-partisan federation of national medical organizations from multiple countries, as well as a partner organization with the International Campaign to Abolish Nuclear Weapons (ICAN).

== Overview ==
The IPPNWC focuses its activities on the abolition of nuclear weapons, the prevention of war, and the promotion of nonviolent means to resolve conflict.It is also dedicated to the advancement of social justice and the development of a more sustainable world. As an example of the group's focus, its Canadian affiliate has in recent years opposed Canada's involvement in the war in Iraq, addressed the country's role in the 2001 war in Afghanistan, and spoken out on Canada's role in the US Ballistic Missile Defense (BMD) system.

While International Physicians for the Prevention of Nuclear War is mostly focused on educational issues, Peace Through Health is a related academic discipline.

Peace Through Health is an emerging academic discipline to study how health interventions in actual and potential war zones may contribute to peace. Often low-key and unadvertised, peace through health initiatives have taken many forms such as a humanitarian ceasefire, the use of health expertise to restrict weapons and war strategies, and the combining of individual and social healing in war zones.

== Focus Group on Small Arms and Light Weapons ==
The Focus Group on Small Arms and Light Weapons is part of Physicians for Global Survival. It is composed of a small group of activists based in Toronto who hope to reduce gun violence through advocacy and research.
