= List of association football statues =

The following is a list of football-related statues.^{a}

== List ==
Image	Title / individual(s) commemorated	Location	Date	Sculptor	Source
	Bobby Moore Sculpture - Bobby Moore	Wembley Stadium, Wembley, London, England	2003	Philip Jackson	
	(The Champions) World Cup Sculpture Bobby Moore, Geoff Hurst, Martin Peters and Ray Wilson	Barking Road and Central Park Road, Newham, London, England	2003	Philip Jackson	
	Bobby Moore, Geoff Hurst and Martin Peters	London Stadium, Queen Elizabeth Olympic Park, London, England	2021		
	Geoff Hurst, Jimmy Armfield, Simone Perrotta	Curzon Ashton, Manchester, England	2010	Andrew Walker	
	Matt Busby	Old Trafford, Manchester, England	1996	Philip Jackson	
	(United Trinity); George Best, Denis Law, Bobby Charlton	Old Trafford, Manchester, England	2008	Philip Jackson	
	Alex Ferguson	Old Trafford, Manchester, England	2012	Philip Jackson	
	Peter Osgood	Stamford Bridge, London, England	2010	Philip Jackson	
	Brian Clough and Peter Taylor	Pride Park, Derby, England	2010	Andy Edwards	
	Brian Clough	Old Market Square, Nottingham, England	2008	Les Johnson	
	Brian Clough	Albert Park, Middlesbrough, England	2007	Vivien Mallock	
	Billy Wright	Molineux stadium, Wolverhampton, England	1996	James Butler	
	Stan Cullis	Molineux stadium, Wolverhampton, England	2003	James Butler	
	Jack Walker	Ewood Park, Blackburn, England	2004	James Butler	
	Bobby Robson	Portman Road, Ipswich, England	2002	Sean Hedges-Quinn	
	Bobby Robson	St James' Park, Newcastle upon Tyne, England	2012	Tom Maley	
	Alf Ramsey	Portman Road, Ipswich, England	2007	Sean Hedges-Quinn	
	Ted Bates	St Mary's Stadium, Southampton, England	2007	Ian Brennan	
	Ted Bates	St Mary's Stadium, Southampton	2008	Sean Hedges-Quinn	
	Stanley Matthews	Britannia Stadium, Stoke-on-Trent, England	2001	Carl Payne and others	
	Stanley Matthews	Hanley, Stoke-on-Trent, England	1987	Colin Melbourne	
	(Everton Trinity); Colin Harvey, Howard Kendall, Alan Ball	Goodison Road, Liverpool, England	2019	Tom Murphy	
	Gordon Banks	Britannia Stadium, Stoke-on-Trent, England	2008	Andy Edwards	
	Johnny Haynes	Craven Cottage, London, England	2008	Douglas Jennings	
	Thierry Henry	Emirates Stadium, London, England	2011	Margot Roulleau-Gallais, Ian Lander, MDM	
	Dennis Bergkamp	Emirates Stadium, London, England	2014	MDM	
	Herbert Chapman	Emirates Stadium, London, England	2011	MDM	
	Tony Adams	Emirates Stadium, London, England	2011	MDM	
	Billy Bremner	Elland Road, Leeds, England	1999	Frances Segelman	
	Don Revie	Elland Road, Leeds, England	2012	Graham Ibbeson	
	Dixie Dean	Goodison Park, Liverpool, England	2001	Tom Murphy	
	Jimmy Hill	Ricoh Arena, Coventry, England	2011	Nicolas Dimbleby	
	Bill Shankly	Anfield, Liverpool, England	1997	Tom Murphy	
	William McGregor	Villa Park, Birmingham, England	2009	Sam Holland	
	Billy McNeill	Celtic Park, Glasgow, Scotland	2022	John McKenna	
	Jock Stein	Celtic Park, Glasgow, Scotland	2011	John McKenna	
	Jimmy "Jinky" Johnstone	Jimmy Johnstone Memorial Garden, Old Edinburgh Road, View Park, Lanarkshire, England	2011	John McKenna	
	Jimmy Johnstone	Celtic Park, Glasgow, Scotland	2008	Kate Robinson	
	Brother Walfrid	Celtic Park, Glasgow, Scotland	2005	Kate Robinson	
	(The Splash) - Tom Finney	Deepdale, Preston, England	2004	Peter Hodgkinson	
	Duncan Edwards	Dudley, West Midlands, England	1999	James Butler	
	Hughie McIlmoyle	Brunton Park, Carlisle, England	2005		
	George Hardwick	Riverside Stadium, Middlesbrough, England	2000	Keith Maddison	
	Wilf Mannion	Riverside Stadium, Middlesbrough, England	2004	Tom Maley	
	Tofig Bahramov	Baku, Azerbaijan	2004		
	Bob Stokoe	Stadium of Light, Sunderland, England	2006	Sean Hedges-Quinn	
	(The Lads) Sunderland fans	Stadium of Light, Sunderland, England	2003	Andy Edwards	
	Jimmy Armfield	Bloomfield Road, Blackpool, England	2011	Les Johnson	
	Stan Mortensen	Bloomfield Road, Blackpool, England	2005	Peter Hodgkinson	
	Jackie Milburn	Station Road, Ashington, England	1995	John W Mills	
	Jackie Milburn	St James' Park, Newcastle upon Tyne, England	1996	Tom Maley	
	Alan Shearer	St James' Park, Newcastle upon Tyne, England	2016	Tom Maley	
	John Greig	Ibrox Stadium, Glasgow, Scotland	2001	Andy Scott	
	Jim Baxter	Hill of Beath, Fife, Scotland	2003	Andy Scott	
	Derek Dooley	Bramall Lane, Sheffield, England	2010	Paul Vanstone	
	Joe Shaw	Bramall Lane, Sheffield, England	2010	Paul Vanstone	
	Emlyn Hughes	Abbey Road, Barrow-in-Furness, England	2008	Chris Kelly	
	Sam Bartram	The Valley, Charlton, London, England	2006	Anthony Hawken	
	Fred Keenor	Cardiff City Stadium, Cardiff, Wales	2012	Roger Andrews	
	Headbutt - Zinedine Zidane and Marco Materazzi	Pompidou Centre, Paris, France (2012-2013); Arab Museum of Modern Art, Doha, Qatar (2013-)	2012	Adel Abdessemed	
	Nat Lofthouse	Reebok Stadium, Bolton, England	2013	Sean Hedges-Quinn	
	Roy Sproson	Vale Park, Stoke-on-Trent, England	2012	Mike Talbot	
	Arthur Wharton	St George's Park National Football Centre, Burton-on-Trent, England	2014	Vivien Mallock	
	West Auckland F.C.	West Auckland, England	2013	Nigel Boonham	
	John King	Prenton Park, Tranmere, England	2014	Tom Murphy	
	Cristiano Ronaldo	Funchal, Madeira, Portugal	2014	Ricardo Valosa	
	Dylan Tombides	Nib stadium, Perth, Australia	2015	Robert Hitchcock	
	Hilderaldo Bellini	Estádio do Maracanã, Rio de Janeiro, Brazil	1960	Matheus Fernandes	
	Pelé	Três Corações, Brazil; Arena Fonte Nova, Salvador, Brazil	1971	Lucy Viana	
	René Higuita	Medellín, Colombia	1989	Tulio Enrique Garzón	
	Eusébio	Estádio da Luz, Lisbon, Portugal	1992	Daker Bower	
	Lev Yashin	Dynamo Central Stadium, Moscow, Russia	1999	Aleksandr Rukavishnikov	
	Carlos Valderrama	Santa Marta, Colombia	2002	Amilcar Ariza	
	Andrés Escobar	Medellín, Colombia	2002	Alejandro Hernandez	
	Romário	Estádio São Januário, Rio de Janeiro, Brazil	2007	Osório Corrêa	
	Zico	Ninho do Urubu, Rio de Janeiro, Brazil (Note: Originally at the Estádio do Maracanã, the statue was moved in 2021 to the training center of CR Flamengo.)	2009	Abel Gomes	
	Nílton Santos	Estádio Nilton Santos, Rio de Janeiro, Brazil	2009	Edgar Duvivier	
	Garrincha	Estádio Nilton Santos, Rio de Janeiro, Brazil	2010	Edgar Duvivier	
	Jairzinho	Estádio Nilton Santos, Rio de Janeiro, Brazil	2010	Edgar Duvivier	
	Heleno de Freitas	São João Nepomuceno, Brazil	2012	Edgar Duvivier	
	Dani Jarque	Estadi Cornellà-El Prat, Barcelona, Spain	2012	Marta Solsona	
	Zico	CR Flamengo headquarters, Rio de Janeiro, Brazil	2013	Edu Santos	
	Zagallo	Estádio Nilton Santos, Rio de Janeiro, Brazil	2013	Edgar Duvivier	
	Fernandão	Estádio Beira-Rio, Porto Alegre, Brazil	2014	Itamor Rodrigues and Nina Eick	
	Quarentinha	Estádio da Curuzu, Belém, Brazil	2014	Alacy Rodrigues	
	Viktor Ponedelnik	Monument to Viktor Ponedelnik, Olimp-2, Rostov-on-Don, Russia	2015	Dmitry Lyndin	
	Dirceu Krüger	Estádio Couto Pereira, Curitiba, Brazil	2016	Edgar Duvivier	
	Pedro Rocha	Porto Alegre, Brazil	2017	Vinícius Vieira and Mario Caldeira	
	Zito	Vila Belmiro, Santos, Brazil	2017	Luis Garcia Jorge	
	Pelé	Resende, Rio de Janeiro, Brazil	2018		
	Renato Gaúcho	Arena do Grêmio, Porto Alegre, Brazil	2019	Theo Felizzola, Iouri Petrov, and Jamil Fraga	
	Túlio Maravilha	Estádio Nilton Santos, Rio de Janeiro, Brazil	2021	Edgar Duvivier	
	Roberto Dinamite	Estádio São Januário, Rio de Janeiro, Brazil	2022	Mário Pitanguy	
	Rui Patrício	Leiria, Portugal	2017		
	David Beckham	Dignity Health Sports Park, Los Angeles, California, United States	2019	Omri Amrany	
	Brandi Chastain	Rose Bowl, Pasadena, California, United States	2019	Brian Hanlon	
	Lily Parr	National Football Museum, Manchester, England	2019	Hannah Stewart	
	Michael Essien	Kumasi, Ghana	2010	Dominic Ebo Bismarck	
	Ángel Labruna	Monumental de Nuñez, Buenos Aires, Argentina	2015	Mercedes Savall	
	Marcelo Gallardo	Monumental de Nuñez, Buenos Aires, Argentina	2023	Mercedes Savall	
	Statue of Kazimierz Deyna – Kazimierz Deyna	Polish Army Stadium, Warsaw, Poland	2012	Tomasz Radziewicz	
	Henrik Larsson	Helsingborg, Sweden	2011	Bjorn Elmart	
	Alex De Souza	Istanbul, Turkey	2012	Aşan Akın	
	Nuri Asan, Muzaffer Badalıoğlu, Mete Adanır, Zoran Tomić	Samsun Stadium, Turkey	2021		
Jimmy_and_Jack_statue	'Legends of the Lane' Jimmy Sirrel and Jack Wheeler	Meadow Lane Stadium, Nottingham	2016	Andy Edwards	
	Kevin Beattie	Portman Road, Ipswich	2021	Sean Hedges-Quinn	
	Chris Turner	London Road, Peterborough	2017	Sean Hedges-Quinn	
	Bob Paisley, Emlyn Hughes	Anfield, Liverpool	2020	Andy Edwards	
	Diego Maradona	Villa General Mitre, Buenos Aires, Argentina	2018	Jorge Martinez	
	Diego Maradona	Stadio Diego Armando Maradona, Naples, Italy	2021	Domenico Sepe	
	Diego Maradona	Estadio Único Madre de Ciudades, Santiago del Estero, Argentina	2021	Carlos Benavídez	
	Lionel Messi	Paseo de la Gloria, Buenos Aires, Argentina	2017	Carlos Benavídez	
	Jack Charlton	Ashington, Northumberland	2022	Douglas Jennings	
	Vincent Kompany	City of Manchester Stadium, Manchester	2021	Andy Scott	
	David Silva	City of Manchester Stadium, Manchester	2021	Andy Scott	
	Sergio Agüero	City of Manchester Stadium, Manchester	2022	Andy Scott	
	Colin Bell, Francis Lee, Mike Summerbee	City of Manchester Stadium, Manchester	2023	David Williams-Ellis	
	Jack Leslie	Home Park, Plymouth	2022	Andy Edwards	
	Arsène Wenger	Emirates Stadium, London	2023	Jim Guy	
	Jimmy Dickinson	Fratton Park	2023	Douglas Jennings	
	Harry Kane	Yet to be located	2020		
	Vichai Srivaddhanaprabha	King Power Stadium, Leicester	2022		
	Ion Oblemenco	Stadionul Ion Oblemenco, Craiova	1991	Anton Barbu-Panaghia	
	Florian Krygier Bench – Florian Krygier	Florian Krygier Municipal Stadium, Szczecin	2023	Maciej Jagodziński	

== See also ==
- List of Australian rules football statues

== Notes ==
- ^ Note a: It does not include any busts, friezes, figurines, medallions, cameos or deathmasks.
