= Thomas Donohoe =

Dyer and football pioneer in Brazil

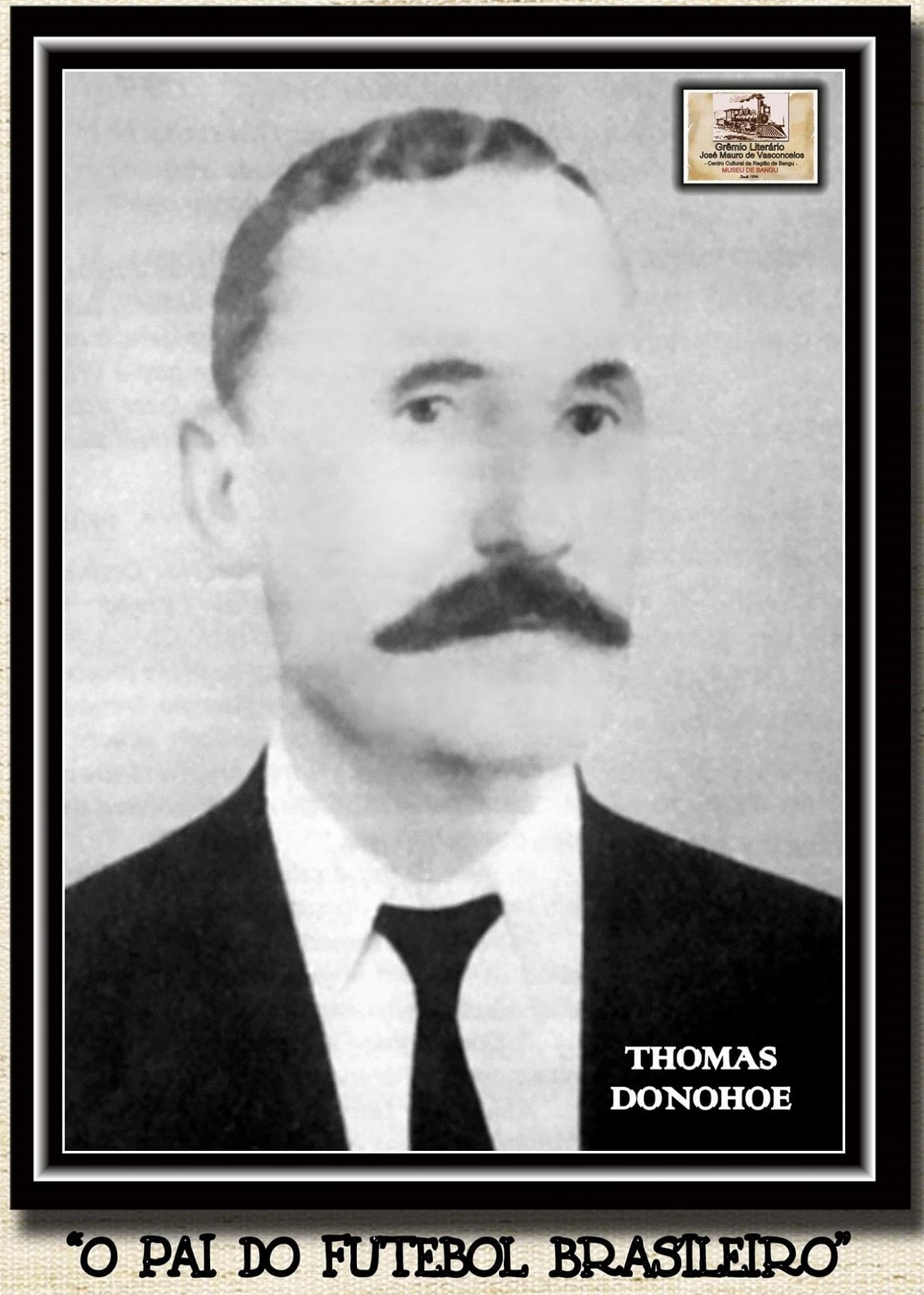
- Source: Bangu Museum
- Born: 25 January 1863; Busby, Renfrewshire, Scotland
- Died: 2 April 1925 (aged 62); Bangu, Rio de Janeiro, Brazil
- Occupation: Dyeworks Foreman
- Known for: The Father Of Brazilian Football
- Children: 2
- Parent(s): Patrick Donohoe, Mary Ann Sloan

Thomas Donohoe, the "Father Of Brazilian Football", was a master dyer in the calico printing industry. Thomas emigrated to Brazil in 1894. He organized football matches in Bangu (now a suburb of Rio de Janeiro) that year with fellow employees of the textile company Progresso Industrial Do Brazil.

Charles Miller, who some others claim to have brought football to Brazil, arranged his first match in April of the following year in São Paulo.

== Early life ==
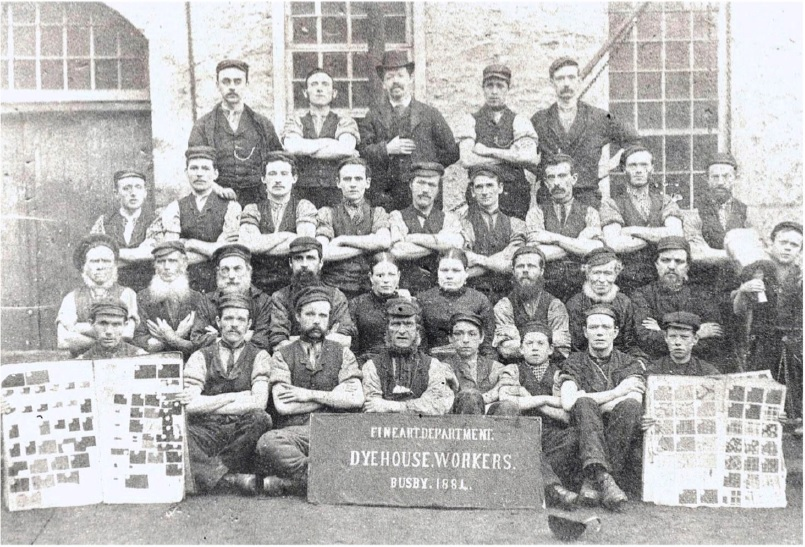
Dyehouse workers. Busby Printworks. 1884. Thomas, extreme right, back row. His brother, James, wearing the bowler hat, back row.

Thomas Donohoe was born, in Busby, on 25 January 1863.

Thomas' parents, Patrick Donohoe and Mary Ann Sloan, were Irish immigrants. Patrick was born in County Wicklow and is known to have links to Stratford-on-Slaney. That town had extensive calico printing works. Patrick and his parents worked in this industry.

Patrick, and his parents, moved to Scotland before the 1841 U.K. census. They settled, firstly, in Milton, West Dunbartonshire and moved to Busby before the U.K. census of 1851. Patrick married Mary Ann Sloan in 1851 in Pollokshaws, Glasgow. They had four sons, including Thomas, and three daughters.

Patrick was a block printer but eventually became the dyehouse foreman at the Busby printworks which was owned by Inglis And Wakefield. The printworks occupied what is now, mostly, an industrial estate at the bottom of Field Road.

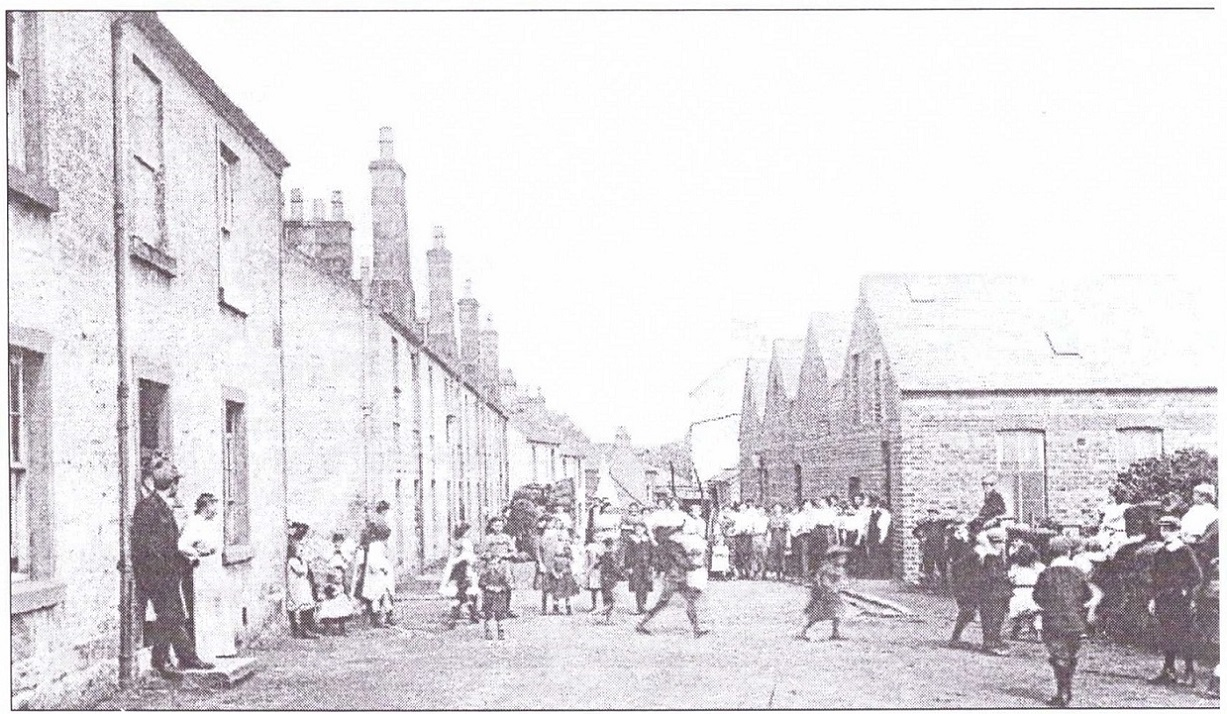
Burnside Terrace. 1910. Originally called Spinners Land. Now known as Riverside Terrace.

When Patrick retired, his eldest son, James, became the dyehouse foreman.

Thomas was educated at the well regarded, fee-paying school in Church Lane (now Church Road), Busby. He left school around 1876 to become an apprentice dyer at the printworks. Both Thomas and his brother, James, appear in an 1884 photo of the dyehouse employees. They are in the back row. Thomas is on the extreme right and James is in the centre, wearing a bowler hat.

Thomas lived in Burnside Terrace (now Riverside Terrace), Busby in 1871 and 1891, according to the U.K. census. Burnside Terrace was less than 300 metres north of the Busby printworks. In the 1881 census, he is recorded as living in Burtons Land, Busby.

== Family ==
Donohoe married Elizabeth Montague (aka McTague), eight years his junior, in Busby in 1890. They had two children, John, born in 1891, and Patrick, born in 1894.

John is recorded living with his maternal grandparents in Busby in the 1901 and 1911 census. He was enlisted in the Royal Navy during World War One and died in Glasgow in 1962. John probably lived in Scotland all his life.

Patrick went to live, at some time in or after 1894, with his parents to Brazil and lived there most of his life. He may have been in Scotland during his childhood/early adulthood years because he is reported as living with his maternal grandparents in the 1911 census.

Both John and Patrick had children, although Patrick has no living descendants.

Elizabeth died, date unknown, in Brazil. Thomas married Abigail DaSilva Torres, a Brazilian of Portuguese ancestry, in Rio de Janeiro in 1918. She was twenty-four years younger than him. Abigail's date and place of death are unknown. Thomas and Abigail had no children.

== Life In Brazil ==
Platt Brothers of Oldham, Greater Manchester supplied machinery to Inglis & Wakefield, the Busby printworks owners, over many years. In 1892 or 1893, Platt Brothers delivered equipment and key personnel to a new calico print factory in Bangu. Donohoe was recruited by Platt Brothers to work as the Bangu dyeworks foreman.

Thomas travelled on the SS Clyde, from Southampton to Rio de Janeiro on 4 May 1894, arriving on 21 May. He left his wife and two young children in Busby.

Thomas and Abigail Donohoe. Circa 1918. In the garden of their home at No.7 Rua Fonseca, Bangu. Source: Bangu Museum.

Donohoe asked his family to join him in Brazil once he was satisfied that they could build a new life there. Eliza and her sister, Margaret Montague, left Liverpool bound for Rio on 16 August 1894. The Donohoe children, John and Patrick, do not appear on the passenger list. Hence it is not clear when the boys arrived in Brazil.

There were roughly a dozen British men working at the factory around the time of Donohoe's arrival. They began playing football, organised by Donohoe, in 1894 (see next section).

In 1897, the British workers asked the factory owners for help in forming a football club. A book celebrating the textile company's centenary, written by Gracilda Alves, says that the company secretary, Eduardo Gomes Ferreira, rejected the proposal. He said that the workers could spend their leisure time at the two company supported clubs - Progresso de Bangu Musical Society and the Fábrica Operários Music Band. It was also believed that athletic activities were associated with gambling which the company didn't wish to encourage. Perhaps the company also considered that football would distract the employees from their company work. Leisure time was limited as the factory working hours were 6am to 5pm Monday to Saturday with Sundays off. If a club had been inaugurated in 1897 it would have been the first Brazilian club dedicated to football.

== Bangu Athletic Club ==
Bangu Athletic Club was formed on Sunday, 17 April 1904. For some unknown reason, Donohoe did not attend the inaugural meeting. In his absence, he was elected vice-president. The meeting decided that the club's colours were to be red and white. Teams would be formed for football, cricket, tennis and other sports. The factory owners were asked, and agreed, to provide all the necessary kits. The first football match took place the following Sunday.

Brazilian football, in its early years, was played exclusively by middle/upper class European expatriates. This was not the case at Bangu A.C. They made the game more inclusive, everyone was welcome to play for the club. The club's players all worked at the factory. The factory foremen were European but Brazilians formed the bulk of the workforce.

Francisco Carregal, the first black Brazilian footballer, played for Bangu between 1905 and 1912. As a consequence, Bangu A.C. was awarded, in 2001 by the Rio de Janeiro state government, the Tiradentes Medal "For fearlessness and pioneering spirit in the fight to overcome discriminatory prejudices against athletes".

== "Father Of Brazilian Football" ==
Thomas died on 2 April 1925, of tuberculosis, in Bangu. Bangu A.C. recorded in the minutes of a meeting held the same day that Thomas brought football to Bangu.

In 1940, Guilherme Pastor gave a newspaper interview discussing the origins of the Bangu A.C. He says that football was first played in Bangu in 1894 by the British workers at the Bangu textile factory (note that Donohoe arrived in Bangu in the first half of 1894). Pastor also says that the British played football ‘although without obeying a regular organisation’. This could mean, for example, that there were not eleven players per side or the pitch wasn't a regulation size etc. Pastor played for the club between 1911 and 1914 and, post his playing days, held various management positions within the club.

The 1948 obituary of Thomas’ son, Patrick, who was a striker for Bangu A.C., also says that Thomas introduced football to Bangu.

There are internet articles which describe the first football match soon after Thomas’ wife, Elizabeth, arrived in Brazil in late 1894. These articles say that Elizabeth, at Thomas’ request, brought the first ball from Scotland to Brazil. The original source of these stories is the first chapter of "Nós é Que Somos Banguenses" (We are the People Of Bangu) written by Carlos Molinari. These descriptions should not to be taken literally. Their purpose is to make Thomas Donohoe's story more appealing, to put more life into it.

== Bangu Statue ==
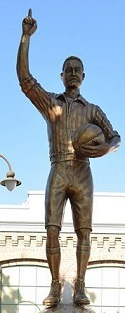
Thomas Donohoe statue. Bangu Shopping Centre.

A statue, over four metres high, of Thomas Donohoe has been constructed by Clécio Regis, sculptor, set designer and businessman. He also financed the project. The sculpture was designed by Benevenuto Rovere Neto, the president of the Literary Guild José Mauro de Vasconelos, a museum in Bangu. The raised finger shows that Donohoe is the first to bring football to Brazil.

The statue is in the car park of a Bangu shopping centre. The buildings of the textile factory where Donohoe worked are part of the centre. The complex is bordered by Rua Fonseca (the Donohoes lived in this street) to the east and Rua Dos Acudes to the west.

The statue was unveiled on 5/Jun/2014. The first game of that year's World Cup, held in Brazil, took place one week later.

== Busby Monument ==
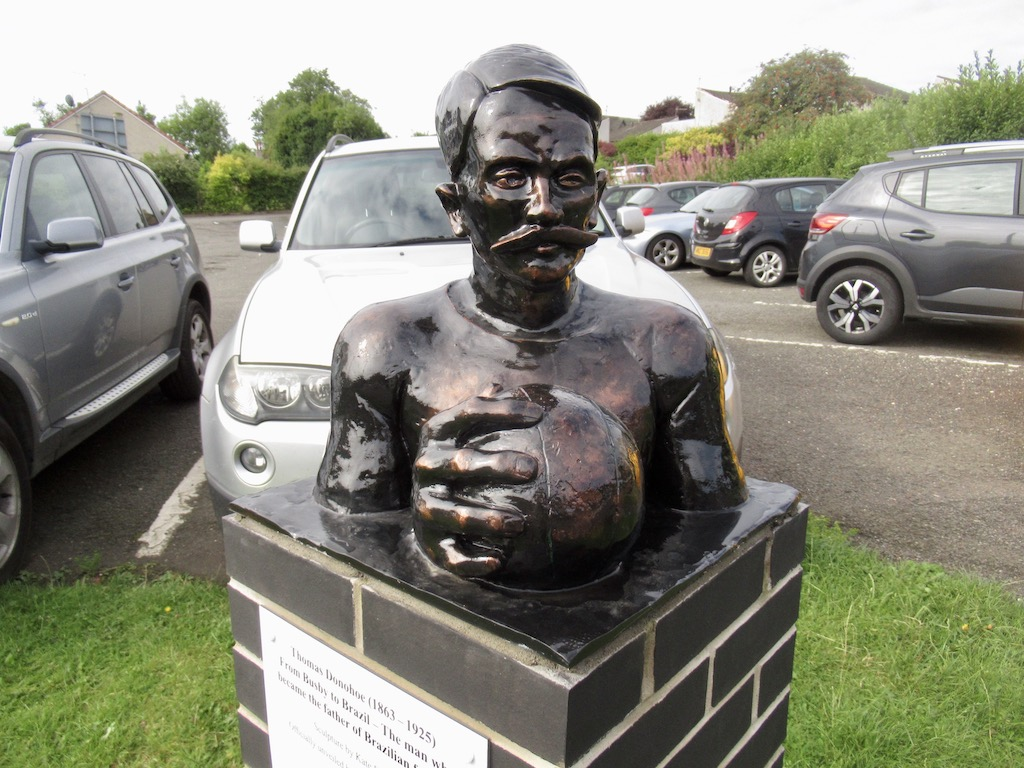
Bust of Donohoe in Busby, Scotland

A sculpture in Donohoe's hometown of Busby, East Renfrewshire, was commissioned by the local council and officially unveiled in June 2022. The monument was designed and created by Kate Robinson whose previous works include the Brother Walfrid sculpture at Celtic Park. The bust is located in the car park at Mary Young Place and is made of carbon fibre on a blick plinth with dimensions 1600 x 700 x 700 mm. The reverse of the bust features the Brazilian flag together with a representation of the mountains of Ben Lomond (Scotland) and Sugarloaf (Brazil).

== Patrick Donohoe ==
Patrick Donohoe (1894–1948), Thomas’ son, was the first star player of Bangu football club. It was said that fans used to turn up to watch him train.

He played for the club between 1913 and 1922.

In a 1955 newspaper article, Jose Trocolli, the secretary of the F.M.F., says that Patrick was an early proponent of the bicycle kick, employing it before Leonidas Da Silva.

He was born in Busby, East Renfrewshire and died in Rio de Janeiro.

== 2026 FIFA World Cup ==
When Scotland qualified for the 2026 FIFA World Cup and were drawn in the same group as Brazil, the interest in the historic football connections between the two countries was renewed.

"Colonel Mustard and the Dijon 5” released a song (on 29th May) called “The Fathers Of Brazilian Football". The song, which celebrates the Scottish pioneers of Brazilian football, features Donohoe. The music video for the song was shot at the West of Scotland Cricket Club, the site of the first international between Scotland And England in 1872.

“In Search Of The Beautiful Game”, fronted by Kevin Bridges, explores whether modern football still has a “soul” or if its essence has been totally lost to corporate greed and over-commercialisation.

The Brazilian Consulate in Edinburgh launched a competition for the pupils of Largs primary school to design the Brazilian national tartan. Largs was chosen primarily because it is close to Kelburn Castle, renowned for the Brazilian street art adoring the castle walls. The winning design is called the “Spirit Of Brazil” tartan and celebrates the sporting and cultural links between Scotland and Brazil.

Magazine article, “The Brazilian Connection”.

Video, how Scotland taught Brazil to play football.

Scotlandspeople, the official Scottish government’s genealogy website, lists some of the country’s football pioneers.

== Miscellaneous ==
Thomas Donohoe's story was told by Storm Huntley on the Riverside Show, the first program broadcast on the launch night of STV Glasgow.

Donohoe has been mentioned in Early Day Motions in the U.K. and the Scottish Parliaments.

A short clip, featuring a relation of Donohoe's second wife, assessing the competing claims of Donohoe and Charles Miller.

In 2015, in the Rio de Janeiro International Short Film Festival, a Portuguese movie about Bangu and Thomas Donohoe called "Bola Para Seu Danau" ("Ball For Your Danau") won the Curta Rio Award together with 9 other short films about the city. "Seu Danau" was Donohoe's Brazilian nickname.

Alex Salmond, former First Minister of Scotland, gave an interview to a Brazilian newspaper around the time of the 2014 Scottish independence referendum. In the article, Salmond mentions Donohoe's place in Brazilian football.

The navy blue colour of Bangu's third football shirt, for the 2023/24 season, is in honour of Donohoe's Scottish roots.

Donohoe is related, via his grandfather, to the Irish Republican, Michael Dwyer (1772–1825), the Wicklow Chieftain.

Rogerio Melo's collection of videos and news articles. They are mostly from around the time of the unveiling of Donohoe's statue in Bangu.

Pelé, the Brazilian football legend, credits Donohoe with introducing football to Brazil. Pelé, as a teenager, turned down a trial with Bangu Athletic Club because his mother didn’t want him to leave home.

Donohoe only played four matches for Bangu A.C. because he was forty-one years old when the club was founded. He, most likely, played for football teams in/around Busby before he went to Brazil. However, only two local match reports have been found which mention a Donohoe in the 1880s/early 1890s. It is possible, since forenames are not recorded, that the reports are for another person altogether.

Thomas Donohoe made a contribution, via his church, towards the building of the Christ The Redeemer Statue in Rio de Janeiro. His wife also made a donation.

The Scottish Diaspora Tapestry, conceived by the Prestoungrange Arts Festival, was part of the 2014 Scottish Year Of Homecoming tourism campaign. It celebrates the impact Scottish emigrants have had on the places where they settled. One of the tapestry’s panels honours the Fathers Of Brazilian Football.

Couple of AI generated videos.

“Bringing Football Home”, a documentary hosted by Dougray Scott. The 60 minute film explores Scotland’s pivotal role in creating the modern game of football.

Other assorted items of interest, in date order, oldest first.
