= Shearer's Bar =

Coordinates: 54°58′29.2″N 1°37′15.4″W

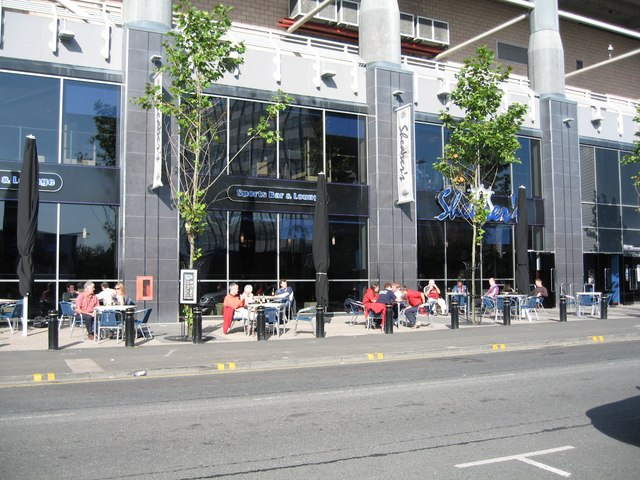
Shearer's Bar in 2006

Shearer's Bar is the name of a sports bar owned by Newcastle United and forming part of St James' Park, the team's stadium in Newcastle upon Tyne, England. It was named in honour of the club's all-time top scorer, Alan Shearer. The bar was renamed Nine in July 2013 by the club, who said that popularity of the venue had "dwindled". In March 2022 it was renamed back to Shearers by the new ownership.

The bar was opened in December 2004 and became an important part of the features at St James' Park. It is designed for the supporters and usually hosts up to 1000 people on a match-day. Since it opened it has become a city attraction and has won awards, including "Best Bar None" Award in 2007. The bar was refurbished in response to competition from The Terrace bar next door.
