= Headbutt (sculpture) =

Bronze sculpture

- Artist: Adel Abdessemed
- Year: 2012
- Type: Bronze
- Dimensions: 500 cm (200 in)

Headbutt (French: Coup de tête) is a sculpture by French-Algerian artist Adel Abdessemed. It is 5 m (16.4 ft) tall and made from bronze. It was unveiled on 26 September 2012 at the Centre Pompidou in Paris, France.

== Background ==
The sculpture depicts an incident that took place in the 110th minute of the 2006 FIFA World Cup Final between France and Italy, when Zinedine Zidane headbutted Italian defender Marco Materazzi in the chest after Materazzi had verbally provoked him. Zidane consequently received a red card and was sent off. France lost the match, which was Zidane's final match as a professional footballer.

== Exhibition ==
=== Pompidou Centre ===
As France subsequently lost the match, exhibition organiser Alain Michaud has described it as "...against the tradition of making statues in honour of certain victories. It is an ode to defeat".

=== Qatar Museums Authority ===
As part of Qatar Museums Authority public art program the sculpture was brought to Doha for an undisclosed amount on 4 October 2013, intended to be permanently installed on the Corniche near Al Mourjan restaurant.

The sculpture was removed on 30 October, owing to criticism from Islamic conservatives who complained that glorifying the infamous act of violence set a bad example for local youth and bordered on idolatry. It was then moved into the Arab Museum of Modern Art in Doha.

The statue has also been exhibited in Tuscany and Avignon.

== See also ==
- List of association football statues
