= Alan Shearer =

English former footballer and pundit (born 1970)

Alan Shearer CBE DL
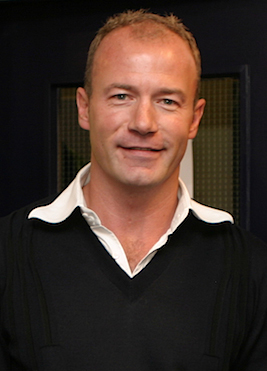
- Shearer in 2008
- Born: 13 August 1970 (age 56); Newcastle upon Tyne, England
- Occupations: Football pundit, footballer
- Height: 6 ft 0 in (1.83 m)
- Spouse: Lainya Shearer (m. 1991)
- Children: 3
Association football career
- Position: Striker
Youth career
- Wallsend Boys Club
- 1986–1988: Southampton
Senior career*
Years	Team	Apps	(Gls)
1988–1992	Southampton	118	(23)
1992–1996	Blackburn Rovers	138	(112)
1996–2006	Newcastle United	303	(148)
Total		559	(283)
International career
1990–1992	England U21	11	(13)
1992	England B	1	(0)
1992–2000	England	63	(30)
Managerial career
- 2009: Newcastle United (interim)
- * Club domestic league appearances and goals

Alan Shearer (born 13 August 1970) is an English football pundit and former professional player who played as a striker. With 260 goals, Shearer is the Premier League's all-time record goalscorer. He was named Football Writers' Association Player of the Year in 1994 and won the PFA Player of the Year award in 1995. In 1996, he came third in both Ballon d'Or and FIFA World Player of the Year awards. In 2004, he was named by Pelé in the FIFA 100 list of the world's greatest living players. Shearer was one of the first two players inducted into the Premier League Hall of Fame in 2021.

Shearer played his entire career in the top level of English football. He started his career at Southampton in 1988 before moving in 1992 to Blackburn Rovers, where he established himself as among the most prolific goalscorers in Europe and won the 1994–95 Premier League. In the summer of 1996, he joined his hometown club Newcastle United for a then world record £15 million, and in his first season won his third consecutive Premier League Golden Boot. He played in the 1998 FA Cup and 1999 FA Cup finals, captaining the team in the latter, and eventually became the club's all-time top scorer. (Note: Whilst Shearer holds the record for goals scored in the Premier League, formed in 1992, the record for goals scored in the top flight in English football is 357, held by Jimmy Greaves. Shearer has scored 283 top flight goals, including 23 in the Football League First Division. - "England - All-Time Topscorers". Rec.Sport.Soccer Statistics Foundation. Archived from the original on 20 July 2022.) He retired at the end of the 2005–06 season.

For the England national team, Shearer appeared 63 times and scored 30 goals. UEFA Euro 1996 was his biggest success at international football; England reached the semi-finals and Shearer was awarded the UEFA Euro Golden Boot and was named in the UEFA Euro Team of the Tournament. He went on to captain England at 1998 FIFA World Cup and UEFA Euro 2000, then retired from international football.

Since retiring as a player in 2006, Shearer has worked as a television pundit for the BBC. He is one of the hosts of the podcast The Rest Is Football. In 2009, he briefly left his BBC role to become Newcastle United's manager in the last eight games of their 2008–09 season, in an unsuccessful attempt to save them from relegation. Shearer is a Commander of the Order of the British Empire (CBE), a Deputy Lieutenant of Northumberland, a Freeman of Newcastle upon Tyne and an honorary Doctor of Civil Law of Northumbria and Newcastle Universities.

== Early life ==
Alan Shearer was born on 13 August 1970 in Gosforth, Newcastle upon Tyne (then a part of Northumberland), the son of working class parents Anne and sheet-metal worker Alan Shearer. His father encouraged him to play football in his youth, and Shearer continued with the sport as he progressed through school. He was educated at Gosforth Central Middle School and Gosforth High School. Growing up, he played on the streets of his hometown and was originally a midfielder because "it meant [he] could get more involved in the games". Shearer captained his school team and helped a Newcastle City Schools team win a seven-a-side tournament at St James' Park, before joining the amateur Wallsend Boys Club as a teenager. It was while playing for the Wallsend club that he was spotted by Southampton's scout Jack Hixon, which resulted in him spending his summers training with the club's youth team, a time he would later refer to as "the making of me". Shearer had successful trials for First Division clubs West Bromwich Albion, Manchester City and Newcastle United, before being offered a youth contract with Southampton in April 1986.

== Club career ==
=== 1986–1992: Southampton ===
Shearer was promoted to the first team after spending two years with the youth squad. He made his professional debut for Southampton on 26 March 1988, coming on as a substitute in a First Division fixture at Chelsea, before prompting national headlines in his full debut at The Dell two weeks later. He scored a hat-trick, helping the team to a 4–2 victory against Arsenal, thus becoming the youngest player – at 17 years, 240 days – to score a hat-trick in the top division, breaking Jimmy Greaves' 30-year–old record. Shearer ended the 1987–88 season with three goals in five games, and was rewarded with his first professional contract.

Despite this auspicious start to his career, Shearer was only eased into the first team gradually and made just ten goalless appearances for the club the following season. Throughout his career Shearer was recognised for his strength, which, during his time at Southampton, enabled him to retain the ball and provide opportunities for teammates. Playing as a lone striker between wide men, Rod Wallace and Matt Le Tissier, Shearer scored three goals in 26 appearances in the 1989–90 season, and in the next, four goals in 36 games. His performances in the centre of the Saints attack were soon recognised by the fans, who voted him their Player of the Year for 1991.

In the middle of 1991, Shearer was a member of the England national under-21 football squad in the Toulon Tournament in Toulon, France. Shearer was the star of the tournament where he scored seven goals in four games. It was during the 1991–92 season that Shearer rose to national prominence. 13 goals in 41 appearances for the Saints led to an England call-up; he scored on his debut, and was strongly linked in the press with a summer move to Manchester United. A possible move for Shearer was being mentioned in the media during late autumn of 1991, but he rejected talk of a transfer and vowed to see out the season with Southampton, resisting the temptation of a possible transfer to the two clubs who headed the title race for most of the season. Speculation of a transfer to Liverpool, who finished the season as FA Cup winners, also came to nothing.

During the middle of 1992, Southampton's manager, Ian Branfoot, became "the most popular manager in English football", as he took telephone calls from clubs "trying to bargain with players they don't want plus cash". Although Branfoot accepted that a sale was inevitable, he claimed that "whatever happens, we are in the driving seat". In July 1992, Shearer was sold to Blackburn Rovers for a fee of £3.6 million, with David Speedie reluctantly moving to The Dell as part of the deal. Despite Branfoot's claim to be "in the driving seat", Saints failed to include a "sell-on clause" in the contract. Shearer, less than a month off his 22nd birthday, was the most expensive player in British football. In his four years in the Southampton first team, Shearer made a total of 158 appearances in all competitions, scoring 43 goals.

=== 1992–1996: Blackburn Rovers ===
Despite making just one goalless appearance as England failed to progress past the Euro 1992 group stages, Shearer was soon subject to an English transfer record-breaking £3.6 million bid from Blackburn Rovers. Although there was also interest from Manchester United manager Alex Ferguson, Blackburn benefactor Jack Walker's millions were enough to prise the striker from Southampton, and Shearer moved north to Ewood Park in the middle of 1992.

On 15 August 1992, the opening weekend of the first Premier League season, Shearer scored twice against Crystal Palace with two strikes from the edge of the 18-yard box. He missed half of his first season with Blackburn through injury after snapping his right anterior cruciate ligament in a match against Leeds United in December 1992, but scored 16 goals in the 21 games in which he did feature. Shearer also became a regular in the England team this season and scored his second international goal; it came in a 4–0 1994 FIFA World Cup qualifier win over Turkey in November. Shearer was forced to miss January through to May due to injury and England's World Cup qualification chances were hit by a run of poor form.

Returning to fitness for the 1993–94 season, he scored 31 goals from 40 games as Blackburn finished runners-up in the Premier League. His performances for the club led to him being named the Football Writers' Association Footballer of the Year for that season. On the international scene, England had failed to qualify for the 1994 World Cup finals, but Shearer added three more goals to his international tally before embarking on his most successful domestic season as a player to date.

"Shearer is the classic working class sporting hero ... everything legend demands an English centre-forward should be ... As a striker he comes closer to fitting the Roy of the Rovers fantasy than anyone else lately admired by English crowds".

— Shearer as described in The Guardian on 10 April 1995.

The arrival of Chris Sutton for the 1994–95 season established a strong attacking partnership at Blackburn. Shearer's 34 goals, coupled with Sutton's 15, helped the Lancashire club take the Premier League title from archrivals Manchester United on the final day of the season, and the duo gained the nickname "the SAS" (Shearer And Sutton). Shearer finished the Premier League season with 47 goal-involvements (34 goals, 13 assists); a joint record Shearer shared with Andy Cole of Newcastle United. After being asked by the press how he planned to celebrate winning the title, Shearer replied with "creosoting the fence". Shearer also had his first taste of European football in the UEFA Cup that season, and scored in the second leg as Blackburn went out in the first round, losing to Trelleborgs FF of Sweden. His efforts for the club led to Shearer being awarded the PFA Players' Player of the Year for 1995.

Although the club could not retain the title the following year, Shearer again ended the (now 38-game) season as Premier League top scorer, with 31 goals in 35 games, as Blackburn finished seventh in the league. The previous season's first-place finish also saw the club enter the Champions League. Shearer's only goal in six full Champions League games was a penalty in a 4–1 victory against Rosenborg BK in the final fixture and Blackburn finished fourth in their group, failing to progress to the next stage.

He passed the 100-goal milestone for Blackburn in all competitions on 23 September 1995, scoring a hat-trick in their 5–1 home win over Coventry City in the Premier League. On 30 December, he scored his 100th Premier League goal, making him the first player to hit the landmark, in a 2–1 home win over Tottenham Hotspur. His final tally for the club was 112 goals in the Premier League and 130 in all competitions. His final goals for the club came on 17 April 1996, when he scored twice in a 3–2 home league win over Wimbledon.

Shearer's international strike rate had also dried up, with no goals in the twelve matches leading up to Euro 96. He missed the final three games of the season for his club due to injury, but recovered in time to play in England's UEFA European Championship campaign.

=== 1996–2006: Newcastle United ===
After Euro 96, Manchester United and Real Madrid again sought to sign Shearer, and attempted to enter the battle for his signature. Manchester United chairman Martin Edwards and Real Madrid president Lorenzo Sanz stated that Blackburn Rovers refused to let Shearer go to Old Trafford or Estadio Santiago Bernabéu. Ultimately Shearer joined his boyhood club: Newcastle United, Manchester United's title rivals.

On 30 July 1996, for a world transfer record-breaking £15 million (equivalent to £30 million today), (Note: The football industry has exploded beyond the inflation rate of the Bank of England. Financial experts argue, the Bank of England's inflation calculator is an unreliable method to judge transfers. Using another method that factors in income; experts validate that in 2019, Shearer's equivalent value was £222 million, in comparison to his Bank of England value of £29.96 million.) Shearer joined his hometown club and league runners-up Newcastle United, managed by his hero Keegan.

Shearer's 2019 validated equivalent (£222m) in comparison to top transfer records in 2023
Rank	Player	From	To	Fee	Year	Ref.
1	Alan Shearer	(England) Blackburn	(England) Newcastle	£222m	1996	
2	Neymar	(Spain) Barcelona	(France) Paris Saint-Germain	£198m	2017	
3	Kylian Mbappé	(France) Monaco	(France) Paris Saint-Germain	£163m	2018	
4	João Félix	(Portugal) Benfica	(Spain) Atlético Madrid	£112.9	2019	

Shearer made his league debut away at Everton, on 17 August 1996, and maintained his form during the rest of the season, finishing as Premier League top-scorer for the third consecutive season with 25 goals in 31 Premier League games, as well as winning another PFA Player of the Year accolade, despite a groin injury forcing him to miss seven matches. Among his best performances of the season came on 2 February 1997, when Newcastle went into the final 15 minutes of the game 3–1 down at home to Leicester City in the league, only for Shearer to win them the game 4–3 by scoring a late hat-trick. The league title still eluded the club, who finished second in the league for a second consecutive year, with Keegan resigning midway through the season.

Another injury problem, this time an ankle ligament injury sustained in a pre-season match at Goodison Park, restricted Shearer to just two goals in 17 games in the 1997–98 season. His injury was reflected in the club's form, and Newcastle finished just 13th in the Premier League. To help Shearer get over the injury, club physiotherapist Paul Ferris devised unorthodox methods. At the club's training ground at Durham University, Ferris stacked six school benches and placed Shearer on top with high-jump mats either side – the striker trying to improve his balance by standing on one leg and bending over to pick up coins while having objects thrown at him, while a crowd of student onlookers watched on. United (now managed by Shearer's former Blackburn manager, Kenny Dalglish) had a good run in the FA Cup; Shearer scored the winning goal in a semi-final victory over Sheffield United as the team reached the final. The team were unable to get on the scoresheet at Wembley, and lost the game 2–0 to Arsenal.

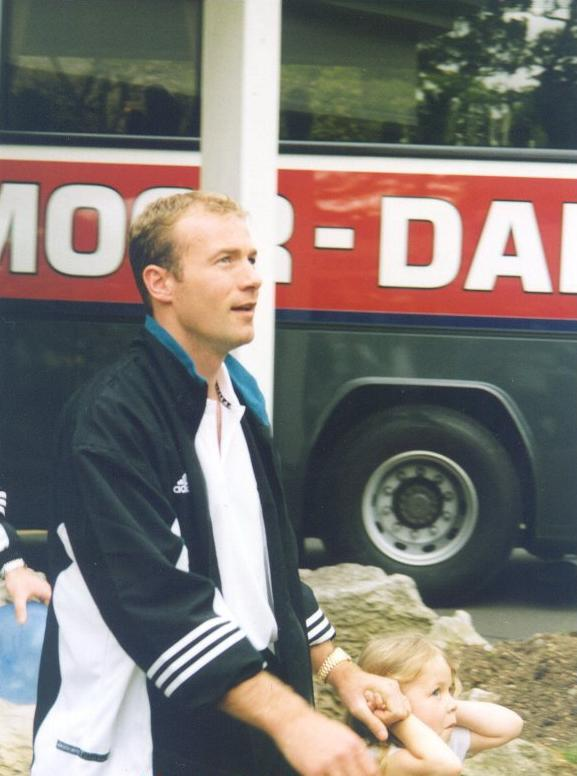
Shearer after the FA Cup final defeat in 1998

An incident during a game against Leicester City in the league saw Shearer charged with misconduct by the FA, with media sources claiming that video footage showed him intentionally kicking Neil Lennon in the head following a challenge. The referee of the game took no action against Shearer, and he was then cleared of all charges by the FA, with Lennon giving evidence in the player's defence. Former Football Association chief Graham Kelly, who brought the charges against the player, later wrote in his autobiography that Shearer had threatened to withdraw himself from the 1998 World Cup squad if the charges were upheld, which was strenuously denied by Shearer.

An almost injury-free season helped Shearer improve on his previous year's tally in the 1998–99 season, the striker converting 14 goals in 30 league games and replacing Rob Lee as Newcastle captain, but Newcastle finished 13th again, with Ruud Gullit having replaced Kenny Dalglish just after the season got underway. He also helped Newcastle to a second consecutive FA Cup final and qualification for the following season's UEFA Cup, scoring twice in the semi-final against Tottenham Hotspur, but they once again lost 2–0, this time to treble-chasing Manchester United.

On the opening day of the 1999–2000 season, Shearer received the first red card of his career in his 100th appearance for Newcastle. After dropping Shearer to the bench in a Tyne-Wear derby loss against Sunderland, the unpopular Gullit resigned to be replaced by the 66-year-old Bobby Robson. Despite Gullit giving Shearer the captain's armband, reports of a rift between club captain and manager were rife, Gullit's decision to drop Shearer proved deeply unpopular with fans and his departure capped a dismal start to the season. The animosity between Shearer and Gullit was later confirmed by the latter, who reportedly told the striker that he was "...the most overrated player I have ever seen." Robson had tried to sign Shearer for Barcelona in 1997, making a bid of £20 million which would have seen Shearer break the world's transfer fee record for the second time in 12 months. Newcastle's manager at the time, Kenny Dalglish, rejected the offer.

In Robson's first match in charge, Shearer scored five goals in an 8–0 defeat of Sheffield Wednesday. With Robson in charge, the team moved away from the relegation zone, finishing in mid-table and reached the FA Cup semi-finals, but a third consecutive final was beyond them as they were beaten by Chelsea. Shearer missed only one league game and notched up 23 goals.

Shearer suffered an injury-hit and frustrating season in the 2000–01 season, having retired from international football after the UEFA Euro 2000 tournament to focus on club football. He managed only five goals in 19 games in the league. The 2001–02 season was much better though: Shearer bagged 23 goals in 37 league games as Newcastle finished fourth – their highest standing since 1997 – meaning they would qualify for the following season's Champions League competition. One of the most memorable incidents of the season saw Roy Keane sent off after a confrontation with Shearer during Newcastle's 4–3 win over the Red Devils in September 2001. Shearer also saw red for the second time in his career this season, after allegedly elbowing an opposition player in a match against Charlton Athletic, but this decision was later rescinded.

The 2002–03 season saw Shearer and Newcastle make their return to the UEFA Champions League. Newcastle lost their first three matches in the opening group stage, but Shearer's goal against Dynamo Kyiv, coupled with further wins against Juventus and Feyenoord saw the club progress to the second group stage.

I know at first hand how fierce the gladiatorial battles are between a striker and defenders. So, to maintain your performance as a top class goalscorer over a long period of time takes phenomenal dedication, self belief and enormous willpower. If you then throw in a number of serious injuries...how many? Three? And for the man to still be producing at the highest level is really an amazing feat. After a match against Juventus I met Alex Del Piero who like myself could only speak in the most glowing of terms about Shearer. He'd terrorised the Juve defenders when the clubs met in Newcastle. They found him one of the most difficult opponents they had ever faced. The coach Marcello Lippi had been purring about Shearer's performance. So much so that his strikers Alex, David (Trezeguet) and Marcelo (Salas) were ordered to take home videos and study Shearer's display.

— Gabriel Batistuta on his admiration of Shearer, February 2003.

Shearer's Champions League hat-trick against Bayer Leverkusen and a brace against Inter Milan in the second group stage helped him reach a total of seven Champions League goals, along with his 17 in 35 games in the league, and a total of 25 for the season as the team again improved to finish in third place in the Premier League.

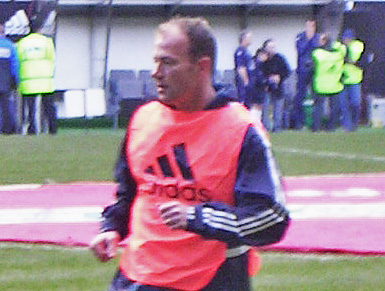
Shearer training in 2005

After this, Newcastle would have one more chance to progress in the Champions League in early 2003, but Shearer was one of those who failed to score as the team were eliminated in a penalty shootout by Partizan Belgrade in the third qualifying round. United progressed well in that season's UEFA Cup and Shearer's six goals helped the club reach the semi-finals, where they were beaten by eventual runners up Olympique de Marseille. Domestically he also had a good season, with 22 goals in 37 appearances, but this did not prevent the club dropping out of the Champions League places to finish in fifth, qualifying once again for the UEFA Cup.

Announcing that this would be his final season before retirement, Shearer's form in the 2004–05 season was patchy; alongside new signing Patrick Kluivert, he scored only seven goals in his 28 games as the club finished the season in 14th place. The club fared better in the cup competitions, eventually losing out to Sporting CP in the UEFA Cup quarter-finals and Manchester United in the FA Cup semi-finals. Shearer scored a hat-trick in the first round win against Hapoel Bnei Sakhnin, and ended the season with a haul of 11 European goals, in addition to his one goal in domestic cups.

The middle of 2005 saw Shearer reverse his decision to retire, after persuasion from manager Graeme Souness. He decided to continue playing in a player-coach capacity until the end of the following season. and he returned for one more season in the 2005–06 season. This last season saw him break Jackie Milburn's 49-year-old record of 200 goals for Newcastle United (not including his 38 World War II Wartime League goals) when he netted his 201st strike in a home Premier League fixture against Portsmouth on 4 February 2006, becoming the club's highest-ever league and cup competition goalscorer with 201 goals altogether. On 17 April 2006, with three games remaining in his final season as a player, Shearer suffered a tear to the medial collateral ligament in his left knee after a collision during a 4–1 win at Sunderland in which he scored his 206th and final goal in what was his 395th appearance for the club. The injury caused him to miss those final three games, effectively bringing forward his retirement. Shearer finished his final season with 10 goals in 32 league games.

=== Tribute and testimonial ===
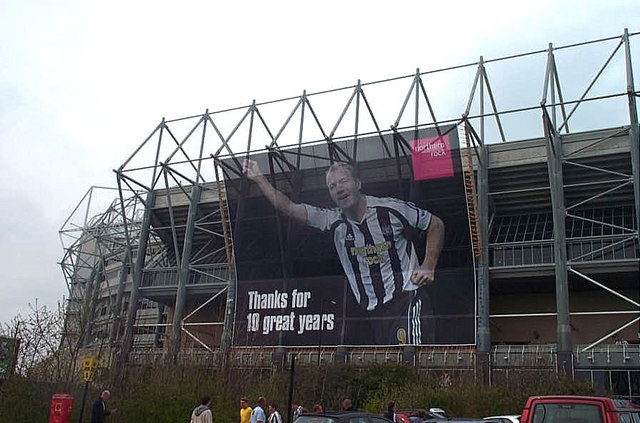
Banner in tribute to Shearer outside St James' Park. Marking his 10 years at the club, it was displayed for three weeks during April and May 2006.

In tribute to Shearer's contribution to Newcastle United over more than ten years, the club erected a large banner of Shearer on the outside of the cantilever superstructure of the Gallowgate End of St James' Park. The banner measured 25 metres (82 ft) high by 32 metres (105 ft) wide, covering almost half of the Gallowgate End, aptly placed above the club bar, Shearer's Bar, opened in his honour in 2005. The banner depicted Shearer as the "Gallowgate Giant", with one arm aloft in his signature goal celebration, with the message "Thanks for 10 great years", and was featured in the media coverage reflecting on his career at the club, with the banner being displayed from 19 April 2006 until 11 May 2006, the day of his testimonial match.

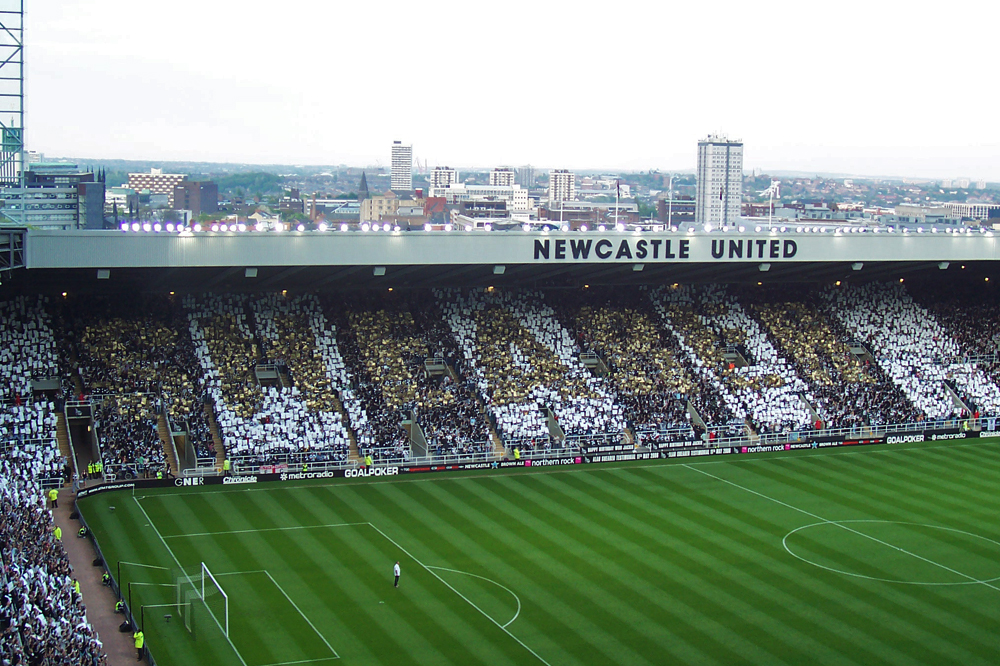
Shearer mosaic created by the fans during his testimonial match in 2006

Shearer was awarded a testimonial match by the club, against Scottish side Celtic. All proceeds of the match went to charitable causes. Because of the injury he sustained three games earlier at Sunderland, Shearer was unable to play in the whole match, but he kicked off the game and came off the bench to score a penalty, helping Newcastle win the game 3–2. The match was a sell-out, and saw Shearer perform a lap of honour at the end with his family, with his young son covering his ears due to the volume of noise produced by the crowd in tribute.

== International career ==
Shearer's international career began in 1990 when he was handed a callup to the England under-21 squad under Dave Sexton. During his time with the squad, he scored 13 times in 11 games, a record return which is still unbeaten. The striker's goals at this level, coupled with his club form, meant he was soon promoted to the senior squad by coach Graham Taylor. Marking his debut in the 2–0 win against France in February 1992 with a goal, he made his only appearance for the England B team a month later. Due to replace Gary Lineker, who retired from international action after UEFA Euro 1992, in the England attack, Shearer played only intermittently in the qualifying campaign for the 1994 FIFA World Cup due to injury and the team failed to reach the competition finals.

UEFA Euro 1996 was a more positive experience for both Shearer and England. With England not required to qualify as hosts, Shearer had not scored in 12 games in the 21 months prior, and even his overall goalscoring record for England did not look too impressive so far, with five goals in 23 games. Shearer scored in the 22nd minute of the first game, against Switzerland. Scoring once in the following game against Scotland and twice in a 4–1 win over the Netherlands, Shearer helped England to progress to the next stage in front of their own fans in Wembley. In the quarter-finals, England were outplayed by Spain but got through to a penalty shootout after a goalless draw. Shearer scored the first England penalty, while the Spaniards failed to score from two of theirs, sending England into the semi-final against Germany. Shearer headed England into the lead after three minutes, but the Germans quickly equalised and the match went to penalties again. This time, Germany won from the spot; although Shearer scored, his teammate Gareth Southgate missed his kick and England were eliminated. Shearer's five goals made him the competition's top scorer, and he was included with teammate Paul Gascoigne in the official UEFA team of the tournament.

The new England manager Glenn Hoddle appointed Shearer captain for the 1998 FIFA World Cup qualifier against Moldova on 1 September 1996, and the player held onto the captaincy after scoring once in that match and twice in the following game against Poland. He scored a total of five goals in England's successful qualification campaign for the World Cup, adding strikes against Georgia and away to Poland to his tally. Shearer was sidelined for much of the 1997–98 season, but recovered to play in the World Cup finals. He scored England's first goal of the tournament, in a 2–0 win over Tunisia, his only goal in the three group matches. England faced long-time rivals Argentina in the second round. Shearer scored a first-half equaliser from the penalty-spot before David Beckham was sent off early in the second half. In the final minutes of the game Sol Campbell headed in what could have been the winning goal only for the referee to disallow it due to Shearer having elbowed goalkeeper Carlos Roa. The scores tied 2–2, the game went to penalties. Shearer scored again, but England were eliminated after David Batty's shot was saved by the Argentina goalkeeper. This defeat ended England's participation in what was to be Shearer's only World Cup tournament.

In September 1999, Shearer scored his only England hat-trick in a UEFA Euro 2000 qualifier against Luxembourg. This helped England reach a play-off against Scotland; England won the game over two legs and in doing so qualified for the European Championship. By now, Shearer was approaching his 30th birthday, and he announced that he intended to retire from international football after the Euro 2000 tournament.

Shearer did not score in England's opening 3–2 defeat against Portugal, but did so as England defeated Germany 1–0 in Charleroi, ensuring that England beat Germany for the first time in a competitive match since the 1966 World Cup final. To remain in the tournament, England only required a draw against Romania in the final group match, and Shearer scored a penalty as England went in at half-time 2–1 up, but Romania ultimately won 3–2. England's tournament was over, and so was Shearer's international career. From his 63 caps, he captained the team 34 times and scored 30 goals; he is ranked 7th in the England all-time goalscorers list, level with Nat Lofthouse and Tom Finney. Shearer remained in international retirement despite speculation of a return during the 2002 World Cup and 2004 European Championship campaigns, and further declined an offer to be assistant manager to Steve McClaren after the 2006 World Cup – a position ultimately filled by Terry Venables.

== Style of play ==
Shearer was often styled as a classic English centre-forward, owing to his strength, physical stature, heading ability and strong shot, which enabled him to be a highly prolific goalscorer. Of his 206 Newcastle goals, 49 were scored with his head. Earlier in his career, especially at Southampton, Shearer played a more creative role: providing chances for fellow strikers, and making runs into space, owing to his link-up play, work-rate, and early development as a midfielder. Later on in his career, Shearer played a more forward role, after his age robbed him of some of his pace. Able to hold the ball up well, he often functioned as a target man, providing balls for other players. Although his strength allowed him to hold on to the ball, his playing style sometimes brought him criticism – most commonly that his play was too physical, and that he used his elbows too aggressively. It was this that contributed to both of his dismissals, although one was later rescinded on appeal. In addition to his playing ability, he also stood out for his leadership qualities throughout his career.

Shearer was noted as a proficient penalty taker for both club and country, and he scored 45 times from the spot for Newcastle, where he was the first-choice taker; with 56 goals from 67 attempts, he is also the most prolific penalty-taker in Premier League history. He also scored five goals from free-kicks for the north-east club. He was known for his accuracy and shooting power from outside the penalty area either when taking set-pieces or from open play.

== Managerial career ==
=== Early career ===
On his retirement as a player, Shearer responded to speculation of an immediate move into coaching, saying that he would take some personal time off to "enjoy life" for the next couple of years. He was also quoted as saying that he would eventually like to move into management "when the time was right". As of March 2009 he was yet to start the UEFA Pro Licence course, which is required to be permitted to manage a team in the Premier League and European competition.

Reflecting his desire for personal time off to "enjoy life", in July 2006 he turned down a coaching role with England, citing his BBC commitments and desire to be away from the pressure of a job within football. Despite this, Shearer was often linked in the media with managerial or coaching positions at his three former clubs.

Shearer took a brief role in the dugout for his final three games under Glenn Roeder. Shearer had rejected offers of coaching or assistant roles at Newcastle under both the returning Kevin Keegan in February 2008 and Joe Kinnear in November 2008. Shearer had previously had talks about, but never been offered, a full-time manager's role at Newcastle until his appointment on 1 April 2009.

=== Newcastle United ===
In a surprise move, late on 1 April 2009, it was announced that Shearer would become the manager of his former club Newcastle United for the remaining eight games of the season, taking over from head coach Chris Hughton who was in temporary charge while the permanent manager Joe Kinnear recovered from heart surgery, having taken ill on 7 February. Shearer stated "It's a club I love and I don't want them to go down. I'll do everything I can to stop that."

Shearer was unveiled at a press conference the following day by club managing director Derek Llambias. In explaining his acceptance of a managerial role at Newcastle at this time, Shearer stated that he would not have done this for any other club in this position, including his two other previous Premier League clubs. Amid persistent questioning regarding the permanency of the appointment, Llambias announced that Shearer was to be manager for the remaining eight games, and after his recovery, Joe Kinnear would return as manager after the end of the season. Shearer confirmed that the BBC had agreed to giving him an 8-week sabbatical from his Match of the Day role. Llambias also confirmed Dennis Wise had left his executive role at the club and the club had no plans to appoint a replacement, with Shearer stating that "the people that have moved, were moving on anyways, that had nothing to do with me". Wise's presence had previously been speculated as being a blockage to any possible appointment of a manager. Shearer accepted the surprise offer on the Monday on the condition that he could bring in Iain Dowie as his assistant. Shearer also brought in Paul Ferris to oversee club medical, physio and dietary matters. Ferris had previously worked with Shearer in his playing days, and had been at the club for 13 years prior to an earlier departure under then manager Glenn Roeder.

Shearer's first match in charge ended in a 2–0 defeat against Chelsea at St James' Park. On 11 April, Newcastle earned their first point under Shearer with a 1–1 draw with Stoke City at the Britannia Stadium with Andy Carroll scoring a late equalising goal. After a defeat to Tottenham Hotspur and a draw against Portsmouth, his first win for Newcastle came in a 3–1 victory over Middlesbrough that lifted Newcastle from the relegation zone.

On the eve of the final day of the season on 24 May, where all fixtures are played simultaneously, Newcastle faced the prospect of being relegated to the Championship, along with Hull City, Middlesbrough and Sunderland, which would end their 16-year unbroken spell in the Premier League. After losing 1–0 at Aston Villa with Damien Duff scoring an own goal, Newcastle were relegated with local rivals Middlesbrough, joining West Bromwich Albion whose relegation had been confirmed in previous weeks, while Sunderland and Hull City survived. Shearer's eight games yielded only five points out of a possible twenty-four.

Shearer did not get the manager's job on a permanent basis. Chris Hughton stepped up from the coaching staff to take charge of the quest to get Newcastle back into the Premier League, which was achieved at the first attempt as Newcastle finished top of the Championship in the 2009–10 season.

== Outside football ==
=== Personal life ===
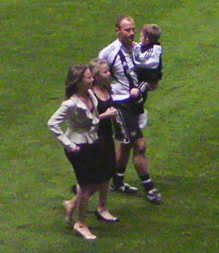
Shearer with his wife and children at his testimonial match in May 2006

Shearer met his future wife, Lainya, whilst playing for Southampton. They lived locally with her parents in the city during his second year at the club, and were married on 8 June 1991 at St James' Church, West End, near Southampton. They have three children together. Shearer has described his wife as a quiet and reserved person who is uncomfortable with the public attention his fame sometimes brings. He cited not wanting to uproot his family as a key reason for remaining in England during his career, having had the chance to move to Juventus or Barcelona when leaving Blackburn. In May 2006, his family accompanied him onto the pitch at St James' Park as he performed a lap of honour following his testimonial match.

Shearer has previously been part of a consortium run by ex-Newcastle player Terry McDermott that owned several racehorses, including Intersky Falcon.

In August 2026, his daughter married Joe Marchant.

=== Personal honours ===
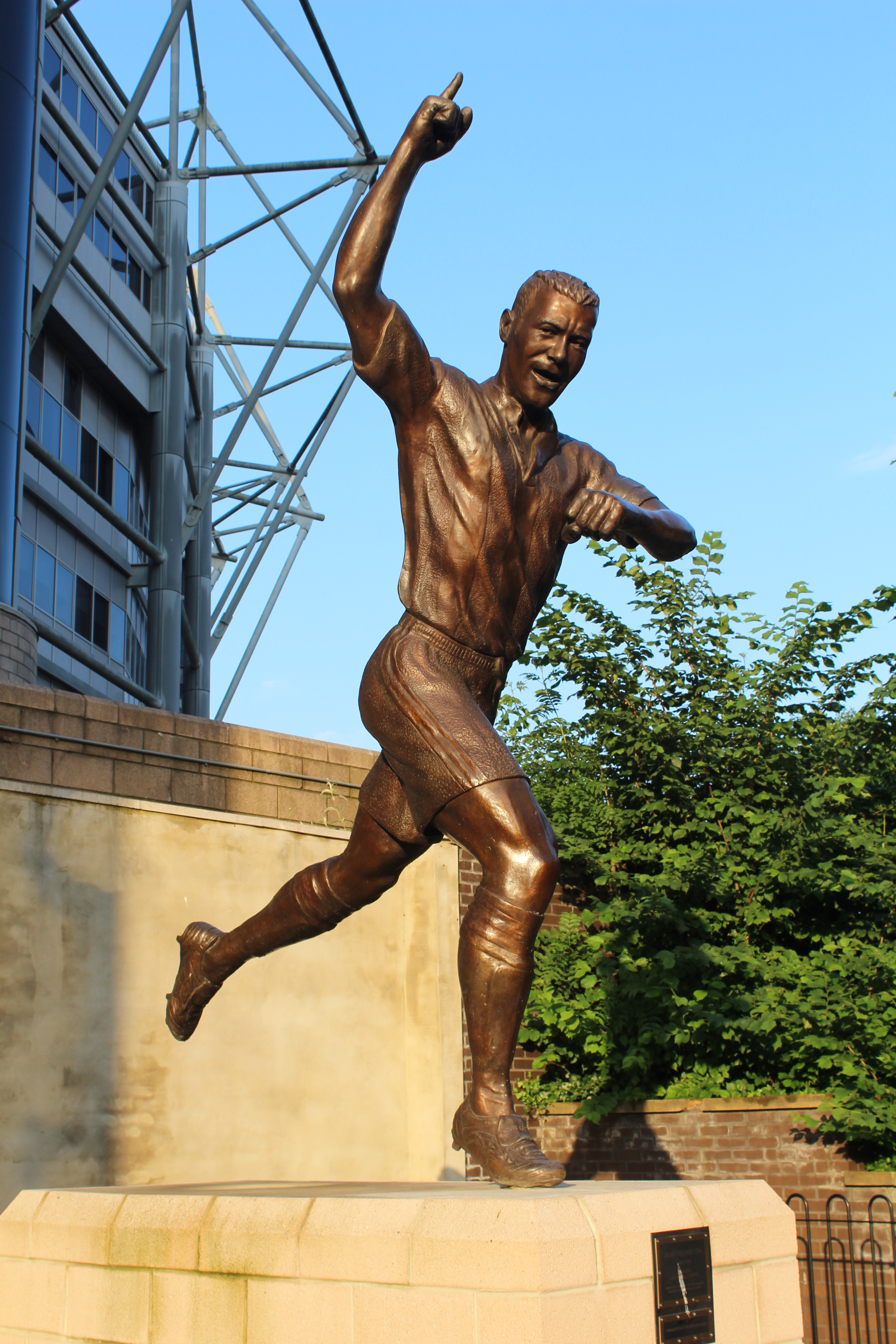
Shearer's statue outside St James' Park, featuring him performing his signature goal celebration

On 6 December 2000, Shearer was given Honorary Freedom of the City of Newcastle upon Tyne, with the citation "in recognition of his role as captain of Newcastle United Football Club and as former captain of England which have enhanced the reputation of the City". Shearer was appointed Officer of the Order of the British Empire (OBE) in the 2001 Queen's Birthday Honours and Commander of the Order of the British Empire (CBE) in the 2016 Birthday Honours for charitable services to the community in North East England.

On 4 December 2006, Shearer was created a Doctor of Civil Law by Northumbria University, at a ceremony at Newcastle City Hall, where the university vice-chancellor declared that "Throughout his career Alan Shearer has been hard-working, committed, disciplined and focused in his endeavours, fighting back from career-threatening injuries with great determination and courage".

On 1 October 2009, Shearer was commissioned as Deputy Lieutenant of Northumberland, having been nominated by the Duchess of Northumberland in her capacity as Lord Lieutenant of Northumberland, and approved for the position by the Queen. In this role, Shearer, along with 21 other deputies, is the stand-in for the Duchess when she cannot fulfill her role as the Queen's official representative in the region at official engagements. Deputies must live within seven miles of the county boundaries, and retain their appointment until age 75. The Duchess said of the appointment that "You could not find a more iconic person than Alan, not just for what he has done in football but for all the extra work he tirelessly does for charity and communities. I am delighted he has accepted the role of Deputy Lieutenant because he is a real role model. I have promised him he is not going to have to do too much, but even if it is just one occasion a year he is the perfect choice"

On 7 December 2009, Shearer was made a Doctor of Civil Law by Newcastle University. Chancellor Liam Donaldson stated "Newcastle United are my team. Alan Shearer is more than just a local legend, he's probably one of the greatest footballers of all time". On 12 September 2016, a statue of Shearer's likeness was unveiled outside St James' Park. It was sculpted by Tom Maley, and paid for by the Shepherd family.

On 26 April 2021, Shearer was announced as the first inductee in the Premier League Hall of Fame.

=== Media ===
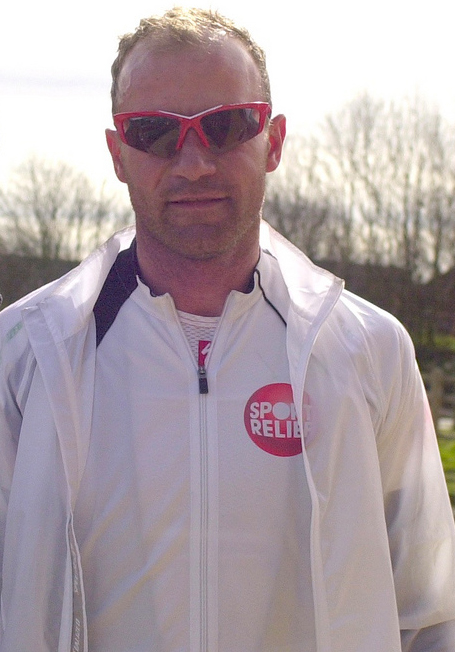
Shearer in Banbury during a cycling marathon

After his retirement and following guest appearances, Shearer became a regular pundit for the BBC's Match of the Day. He also formed part of the team which covered the World Cups and European Championships from 2006 onwards for the BBC. Since August 2023 Shearer has been a co-host of The Rest Is Football alongside Gary Lineker and Micah Richards. During the 2026 FIFA World Cup the show was broadcast on Netflix.

Former Newcastle chairman Freddy Shepherd announced that, after Shearer finished the 2005–06 season as Newcastle's caretaker assistant manager, he would become the club's "Sporting Ambassador" for the 2006–07 season. However, in September 2008, tabloids reported that Shearer was removed from this largely honorary position by the club's owner Mike Ashley – though these reports were denied by the club.

During his playing career Shearer appeared in commercials for the sports drink Lucozade. He is among a group of high-profile athletic figures in British pop culture to promote the brand, which includes Olympic champions Daley Thompson and Linford Christie, footballer John Barnes, rugby player Jonny Wilkinson, and Tomb Raider heroine Lara Croft.

Shearer features in EA Sports' FIFA video game series; he was included in the FIFA 15 Ultimate Team Legends.

On 10 March 2023, following the suspension of Gary Lineker as the host of Match of the Day for allegedly breaching BBC impartiality rules by criticising the government's asylum policy on Twitter, Shearer alongside other pundits announced that they would not present the following episode of the show in solidarity with Lineker.

In October 2024, Shearer's famous quote from UEFA Euro 2024, pressure is for tyres was used by the HarrisWalz campaign.

In November 2024, it was announced that Shearer is set to manage one of the 12 teams in the upcoming Baller League, a six-a-side football league.

=== Philanthropy ===
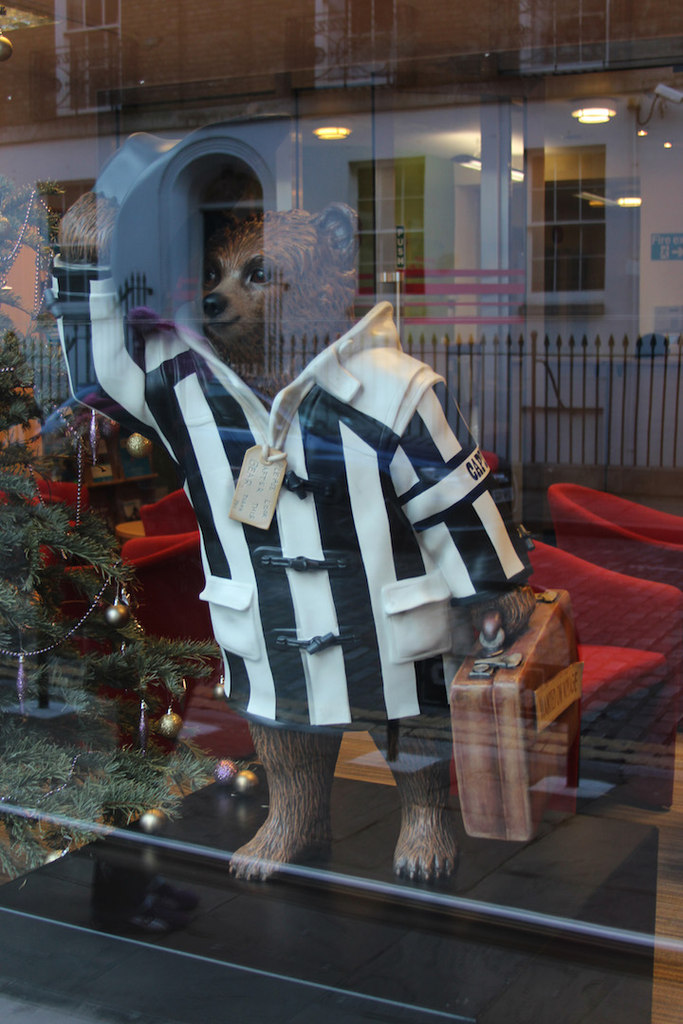
Shearer's Newcastle United-themed Paddington Bear statue on display at the Childline offices in London. It was auctioned for the National Society for the Prevention of Cruelty to Children (NSPCC)

During his playing days, Shearer had been involved with the National Society for the Prevention of Cruelty to Children (NSPCC), taking part in the organisation's Full Stop campaign in 1999. Since retiring from football Shearer has also done work for several charities both nationally and in the Newcastle area.

In his testimonial match, he raised £1.64m benefiting fourteen good causes including £400,000 for the NSPCC and £320,000 for completion of the "Alan Shearer Centre", a respite care facility based in West Denton, Newcastle. In October 2006, he became an ambassador for the NSPCC, describing it as "the kick-off to my most important role yet". He has also worked with The Dream Foundation. In 2006, Shearer founded the Alan Shearer Academy Scholarship to aid the development of promising young players in the region.

In 2008, he raised over £300,000 for Sport Relief in a bike ride with fellow Match of the Day presenter Adrian Chiles, the idea for which emerged in an off the cuff question from cycling fan Chiles to Shearer as to how he kept fit since retirement. Shearer also played and scored twice in Soccer Aid, a game involving celebrities and former players at Wembley Stadium in September 2008, to raise money for UNICEF.

On 26 July 2009, Shearer played and scored in the Sir Bobby Robson Trophy match, a charity match held at St James' Park in tribute of Bobby Robson and in aid of his cancer charity the Sir Bobby Robson Foundation. It proved to be Robson's last public appearance, as he died five days later. On 15 October 2009, Shearer became the new patron of the Sir Bobby Robson Foundation.

== Career statistics ==
=== Club ===
Appearances and goals by club, season and competition
Club	Season	League			FA Cup		League Cup		Europe		Other		Total	
Club	Season	Division	Apps	Goals	Apps	Goals	Apps	Goals	Apps	Goals	Apps	Goals	Apps	Goals
Southampton	1987–88	First Division	5	3	0	0	0	0	–		–		5	3
Southampton	1988–89	First Division	10	0	0	0	0	0	–		–		10	0
Southampton	1989–90	First Division	26	3	3	0	6	2	–		–		35	5
Southampton	1990–91	First Division	36	4	4	2	6	6	–		2 (Note: Appearances in Full Members' Cup)	2	48	14
Southampton	1991–92	First Division	41	13	7	2	6	3	–		6	3	60	21
Southampton	Total		118	23	14	4	18	11	–		8	5	158	43
Blackburn Rovers	1992–93	Premier League	21	16	0	0	5	6	–		–		26	22
Blackburn Rovers	1993–94	Premier League	40	31	4	2	4	1	–		–		48	34
Blackburn Rovers	1994–95	Premier League	42	34	2	0	3	2	2 (Note: Appearances in UEFA Cup)	1	–		49	37
Blackburn Rovers	1995–96	Premier League	35	31	2	0	4	5	6 (Note: Appearances in UEFA Champions League)	1	1 (Note: Appearance in FA Charity Shield)	0	48	37
Blackburn Rovers	Total		138	112	8	2	16	14	8	2	1	0	171	130
Newcastle United	1996–97	Premier League	31	25	3	1	1	1	4	1	1	0	40	28
Newcastle United	1997–98	Premier League	17	2	6	5	0	0	0	0	–		23	7
Newcastle United	1998–99	Premier League	30	14	6	5	2	1	2 (Note: Appearance in UEFA Cup Winners' Cup)	1	–		40	21
Newcastle United	1999–2000	Premier League	37	23	6	5	1	0	6	2	–		50	30
Newcastle United	2000–01	Premier League	19	5	0	0	4	2	–		–		23	7
Newcastle United	2001–02	Premier League	37	23	5	2	4	2	0	0	–		46	27
Newcastle United	2002–03	Premier League	35	17	1	1	0	0	12	7	–		48	25
Newcastle United	2003–04	Premier League	37	22	2	0	1	0	12 (Note: Two appearances in UEFA Champions League, ten appearances and six goals in UEFA Cup)	6	–		52	28
Newcastle United	2004–05	Premier League	28	7	4	1	1	0	9	11	–		42	19
Newcastle United	2005–06	Premier League	32	10	3	1	2	1	4 (Note: Appearances in UEFA Intertoto Cup)	2	–		41	14
Newcastle United	Total		303	148	36	21	16	7	49	30	1	0	405	206
Career total			559	283	58	27	50	32	57	32	10	5	734	379

=== International ===
Appearances and goals by national team and year
National team	Year	Apps	Goals
England	1992	6	2
England	1993	1	0
England	1994	6	3
England	1995	8	0
England	1996	9	8
England	1997	5	3
England	1998	11	6
England	1999	10	6
England	2000	7	2
Total		63	30

Scores and results list England's goal tally first, score column indicates score after each Shearer goal.

List of international goals scored by Alan Shearer
No.	Date	Venue	Cap	Opponent	Score	Result	Competition
1	19 February 1992	Wembley Stadium, London	1	France	1–0	2–0	Friendly
2	18 November 1992	Wembley Stadium, London	6	Turkey	2–0	4–0	1994 FIFA World Cup qualification
3	17 May 1994	Wembley Stadium, London	9	Greece	1–0	5–0	Friendly
4	7 September 1994	Wembley Stadium, London	11	United States	1–0	2–0	Friendly
5	7 September 1994	Wembley Stadium, London	11	United States	2–0	2–0	Friendly
6	8 June 1996	Wembley Stadium, London	24	Switzerland	1–0	1–1	UEFA Euro 1996
7	15 June 1996	Wembley Stadium, London	25	Scotland	1–0	2–0	UEFA Euro 1996
8	18 June 1996	Wembley Stadium, London	26	Netherlands	1–0	4–1	UEFA Euro 1996
9	18 June 1996	Wembley Stadium, London	26	Netherlands	3–0	4–1	UEFA Euro 1996
10	26 June 1996	Wembley Stadium, London	28	Germany	1–0	1–1	UEFA Euro 1996
11	1 September 1996	Republican Stadium, Chişinău	29	Moldova	3–0	3–0	1998 FIFA World Cup qualification
12	9 October 1996	Wembley Stadium, London	30	Poland	1–1	2–1	1998 FIFA World Cup qualification
13	9 October 1996	Wembley Stadium, London	30	Poland	2–1	2–1	1998 FIFA World Cup qualification
14	30 April 1997	Wembley Stadium, London	32	Georgia	2–0	2–0	1998 FIFA World Cup qualification
15	31 May 1997	Silesian Stadium, Chorzów	33	Poland	1–0	2–0	1998 FIFA World Cup qualification
16	7 June 1997	Stade de la Mosson, Montpellier	34	France	1–0	1–0	1997 Tournoi de France
17	22 April 1998	Wembley Stadium, London	38	Portugal	1–0	3–0	Friendly
18	22 April 1998	Wembley Stadium, London	38	Portugal	3–0	3–0	Friendly
19	15 June 1998	Stade Vélodrome, Marseille	40	Tunisia	1–0	2–0	1998 FIFA World Cup
20	30 June 1998	Stade Geoffroy-Guichard, Saint-Étienne	43	Argentina	1–1	2–2	1998 FIFA World Cup
21	5 September 1998	Råsunda Stadium, Stockholm	44	Sweden	1–0	1–2	UEFA Euro 2000 qualifying
22	14 October 1998	Stade Josy Barthel, Luxembourg City	46	Luxembourg	2–0	3–0	UEFA Euro 2000 qualifying
23	28 April 1999	Népstadion, Budapest	49	Hungary	1–0	1–1	Friendly
24	9 June 1999	Stadion Balgarska Armia, Sofia	51	Bulgaria	1–0	1–1	UEFA Euro 2000 qualifying
25	4 September 1999	Wembley Stadium, London	52	Luxembourg	1–0	6–0	UEFA Euro 2000 qualifying
26	4 September 1999	Wembley Stadium, London	52	Luxembourg	2–0	6–0	UEFA Euro 2000 qualifying
27	4 September 1999	Wembley Stadium, London	52	Luxembourg	4–0	6–0	UEFA Euro 2000 qualifying
28	10 October 1999	Stadium of Light, Sunderland	54	Belgium	1–0	2–1	Friendly
29	17 June 2000	Stade du Pays de Charleroi, Charleroi	62	Germany	1–0	1–0	UEFA Euro 2000
30	20 June 2000	Stade du Pays de Charleroi, Charleroi	63	Romania	1–1	2–3	UEFA Euro 2000

=== Manager ===
As of 24 May 2009

Team	From	To	Matches	Won	Drawn	Lost	Win %
Newcastle United	1 April 2009	24 May 2009	8	1	2	5	12.50

== Honours ==
Southampton

- Full Members' Cup runner-up: 1991–92

Blackburn Rovers

- Premier League: 1994–95

Newcastle United

- FA Cup runner-up: 1997–98, 1998–99

England U21

- Toulon Tournament: 1991

England

- Tournoi de France: 1997

Individual

- UEFA European Championship Golden Boot: 1996
- UEFA European Championship Team of the Tournament: 1996
- Football League Cup top scorer: 1990–91, 1992–93
- ESM Team of the Year: 1994–95
- FIFA World Player of the Year – Bronze award: 1996
- Ballon d'Or – Third place: 1996
- PFA Team of the Year: 1991–92 First Division, 1992–93 Premier League, 1993–94 Premier League, 1994–95 Premier League, 1995–96 Premier League, 1996–97 Premier League, 2002–03 Premier League
- PFA Players' Player of the Year: 1994–95, 1996–97
- FWA Footballer of the Year: 1993–94
- Newcastle United Player of the Year: 1998–99, 1999–2000, 2002–03
- Premier League Player of the Year: 1994–95
- Premier League Golden Boot: 1994–95, 1995–96, 1996–97
- FWA Tribute Award: 2001
- North-East FWA Player of the Year: 2003
- English Football Hall of Fame: 2004
- FIFA 100
- Premier League 10 Seasons Awards (1992–93 to 2001–02)
  - Domestic and Overall Player of the Decade
  - Domestic and Overall Team of the Decade
  - Outstanding Contribution to the FA Premier League
  - Top Goalscorer (204)
- Premier League 20 Seasons Awards (1992–93 to 2011–12)
  - Public choice Fantasy Teams of the 20 Seasons
  - Panel choice Fantasy Teams of the 20 Seasons
  - Top Goalscorer (260)
- Premier League Hall of Fame: 2021
- Toulon Tournament 1991
  - Top Goal Scorer
  - Best Player

Records

- Most goals in Premier League history: 260 goals
- Most Premier League penalties scored: 56
- Most Premier League goals scored from inside the box: 227
- Most Premier League goals in a single match: 5
- Fewest matches to score 100 Premier League goals: 124 matches (record lasted: 29 years, 11 months and 2 days)
- First player to score 100 Premier League goals
  - First player to score 100 Premier League goals with two different football clubs
- Fewest matches to score 100 Premier League home goals: 91 matches
- Most Premier League goal-involvements: 324 (260 goals, 64 assists)
  - Most Premier League goal-involvements in a season: 47 (34 goals, 13 assists)
- Top goalscorer in Newcastle United history: 206
- Most European goals scored for Newcastle United: 30

=== Orders ===
- Order of the British Empire
