= Anthony Hawken =

English sculptor

Anthony Hawken (born 1948, died 2025) was an English sculptor. Hawken was a figurative sculptor who worked with bronze, marble, and stone. He was also a medal-maker, printmaker and designer of jewellery.

Hawken was born in London. He studied at the Medway College of Art and at the Royal Academy Schools. Hawken has completed sculptures of Melvyn Bragg, Nicholas Parsons and Norman Lamont and was also responsible for the oversize sculpture of footballer, Sam Bartram which stands outside the ground of Charlton Athletic, The Valley, London. In 2006 he was reported to be working on a statue of former footballer and manager, Alan Curbishley.
