= Florian Krygier Bench =

Monument in Szczecin, Poland

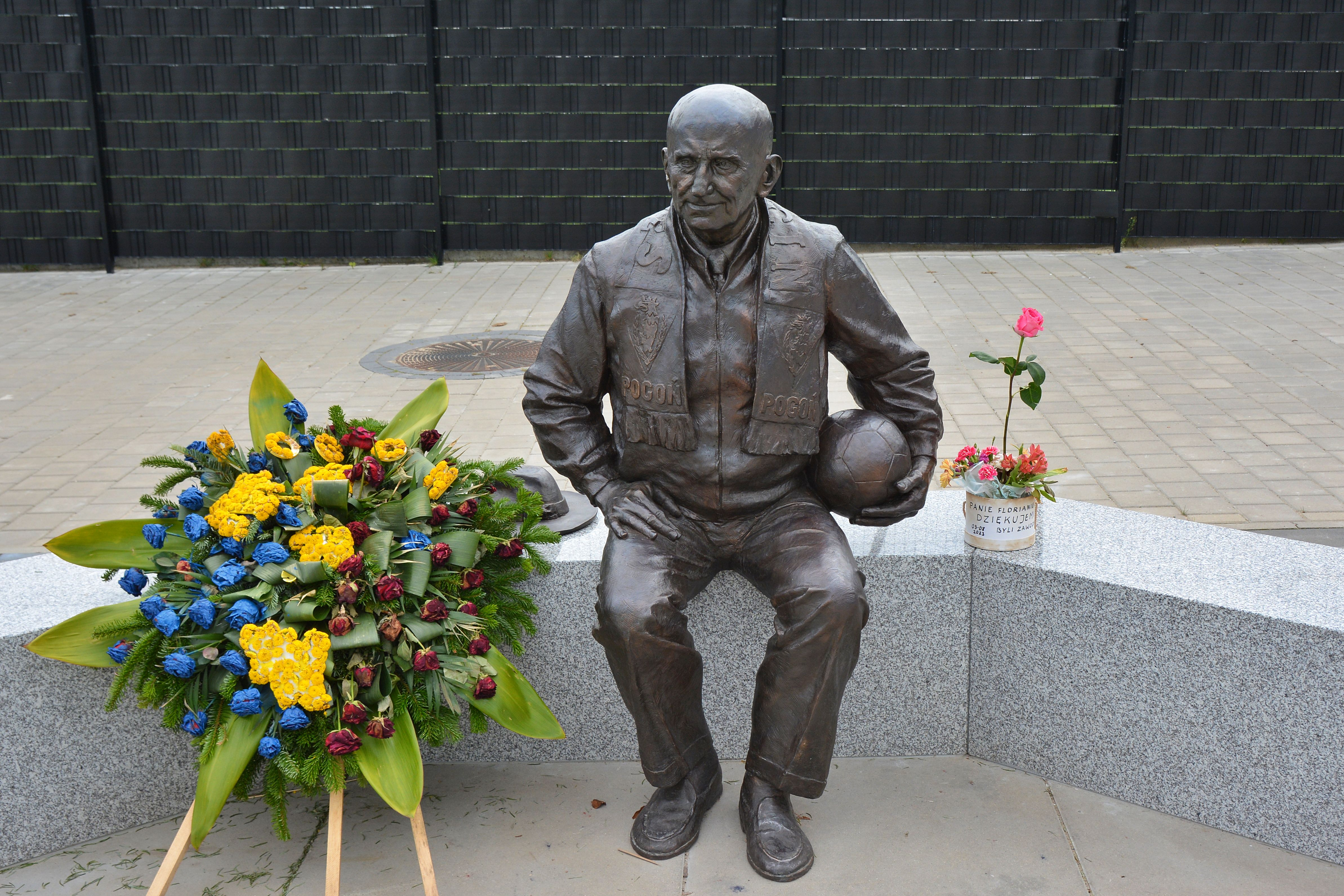
- The monument in 2023.
- Interactive map of Florian Krygier Bench
- Location: 28 Karłowicza Street, Pogodno, Szczecin, Poland
- Coordinates: 53°26′12.30″N 14°31′15.06″E
- Designer: Maciej Jagodziński
- Type: Statue, bench monument
- Material: Bronze (statue); granite (bench)
- Height: 1.55 m (5 ft 1 in)
- Opening date: 3 August 2023
- Dedicated to: Florian Krygier

The Florian Krygier Bench (Polish pronunciation: [ˈflɔ.rjan ˈkrɘ̟.ɡjɛr]; Polish: Ławeczka Floriana Krygiera) is a monument in Szczecin, Poland, located within the neighbourhood of Pogodno within the West district. It is placed in front of the Florian Krygier Municipal Stadium at 28 Karłowicza Street. The monument is dedicated to Florian Krygier (1907–2006), a 20th-century association football coach, who was one of the founders of the club Pogoń Szczecin, which he coached from 1956 to 1958, and in 1960. It has a form of his life-sized bronze statue, depicted in a sitting position on a granite bench. The monument was designed by Maciej Jagodziński, and unveiled on 3 August 2023.

== History ==
The monument is dedicated to Florian Krygier (1907–2006), a 20th-century association football coach, who was one of the founders of the club Pogoń Szczecin, which he coached from 1956 to 1958, and in 1960. In 2021, a proposition to commemorate him with a memorial received the most votes from the municipal participatory budgeting projects. On 27 April 2021, the city council in Szczecin issued a by-law, allowing for its construction at the Florian Krygier Municipal Stadium. It was designed by Maciej Jagodziński, and the city issued the construction permission on 30 June 2023. It was unveiled on 3 August 2023. The ceremony was attended by Piotr Krzystek, the mayor of Szczecin, and Jarosław Mroczek, the chairperson of Pogoń Szczecin.

== Characteristics ==
The monument consists of a life-sized bronze statue of Florian Krygier, placed on a granite bench, in front of the Florian Krygier Municipal Stadium. He is depicted in a sitting position, with his right hand resting on his thigh, and holding a football in his left hand. He is wearing his typical coach outfit, which consists of a suit with a sports jacked worn over it, as well as football scarf draped over his shoulders, featuring the symbols of Pogoń Szczecin. To his right is placed a sculpture of a hat. On the sides of the inscribed two texts in Polish. The one of the right reads "Florian Krygier 1907–2006", while the one on the left reads "W sporcie nigdy się nie przegrywa, bo albo się wygrywa, albo się uczy". The lalter is Krygier's quote, being his coaching motto, and translates to "In the sports, you never lose, because you either win or learn". The monument has the height of 1.55 m.

== Gallery ==
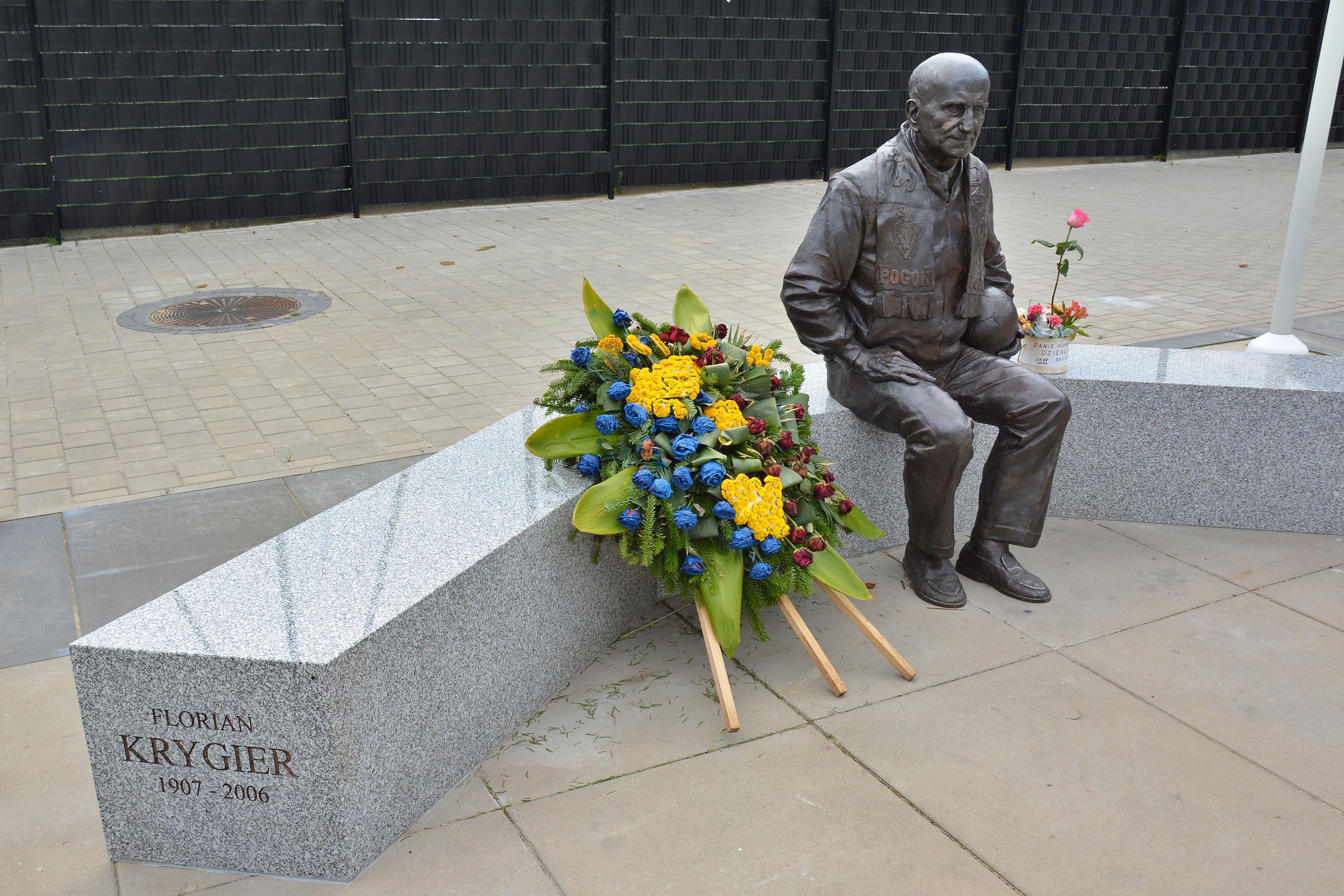
The statue on the bench.
