= Adel Abdessemed =

Algerian artist (born 1971)

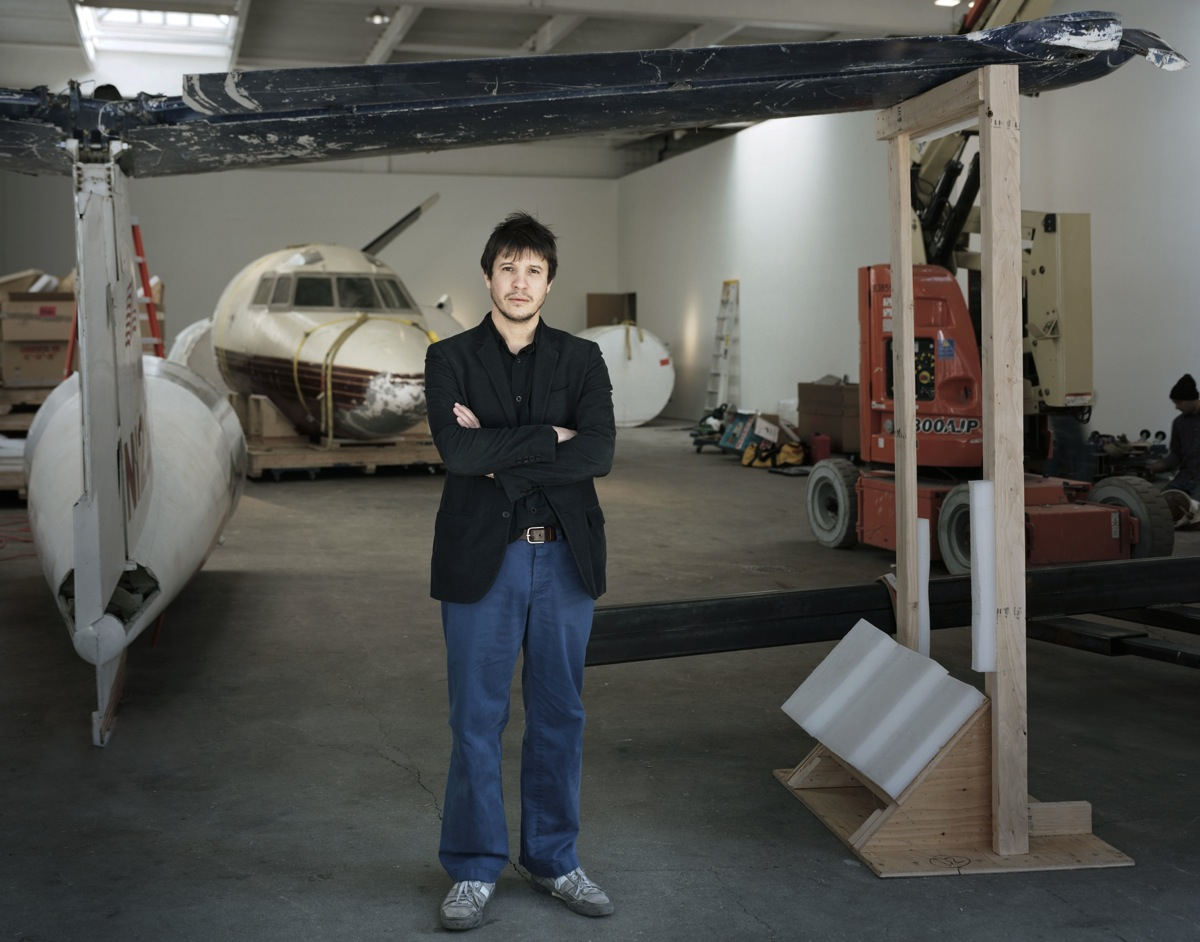
- Abdessemed in New York in 2009
- Born: 1971 (age 54–55); Constantine, Algeria
- Known for: Contemporary art
- Notable work: Coup de tête (2012); Décor (2012)

Adel Abdessemed (born 1971) is an Algerian-French contemporary artist. He has worked in a variety of media, including animation, installation, performance, sculpture and video. Some of his work relates to the topic of violence in the world.

== Biography ==
Abdessemed was born in 1971 in Constantine, in eastern Algeria, to a Chaoui Berber family. He grew up in the area of the Aurès Mountains, and attended the École régionale des beaux-arts in Batna. He then studied at the École supérieure des beaux-arts in Algiers. He left in 1994.

Between 1994 and 1999, Abdessemed attended the École nationale supérieure des beaux-arts in Lyon, in eastern central France. He then lived and worked in the Cité internationale des arts in Paris. In 2000–2001 he was a resident artist at P.S.1 in New York. After spending some time in Berlin, he returned in 2004 to Paris. He is also a French citizen.

He met his wife in a bar in Lyon called L'Antidote in the mid-1990s, an episode represented in the small replica of the venue in a vitrine in the exhibition at MAC in Lyon.

== Work ==
If the collapse of the machine and the first Big War at the beginning of the 20th Century contributed in no small part to the establishment of an art that was suddenly provoking and difficult to look at, the availability of images from the war front in the 1990s made the same process impossible. There is little point in trying to tackle brutality by denouncing it via a series of trite statements or graphic imagery. Adel Abdessemed stated about his work «I think my work is actually positive. The world is violent – not me».

Abdessemed's life-size sculptural variations of iconic images, such as the nine-year-old Phan Thị Kim Phúc (nicknamed 'the Napalm Girl') running away naked from an explosion throughout the Vietnam War in 1972 or the French football player Zinedine Zidane headbutting Marco Materazzi during the 2006 FIFA World Cup Final (Headbutt) are only two examples of how the immediacy of such moments take on fresh meaning when solidified in a form designed to make them still and everlasting. And even in those moments when the relationship between subject and rendition is a bit more fluid, as for example with the combination of the Antonio Canova-inspired sculpture group Is Beautiful with the terracotta-made, hard working men depicted in Sham, the outcome does not seem to change. This is not a literal representation of reality, but rather a sublimation of iconic images to art that takes place.

Adel Abdessemed is known to have a special way to laugh. While studying art in Algeria, one of his professors defined it as 'The Devil's Laugh'.

== Exhibitions ==
=== Solo shows ===
- 2018:
  - Otchi Tchiornie, Mac's Grand-Hornu, Belgium
  - L'antidote, MAC Lyon, Lyon, France
  - Le chagrin des Belges, Dvir Gallery, Brussels, Belgium
- 2017: Conflit, Musée des Beaux-Arts, Montréal, Canada
- 2016
  - Politics of Drawing, Cahiers d'Art, Paris, France
  - Surfaces, église des Célestins, Festival d'Avignon, France
  - Bristow, commissioned by Bold Tendencies CIC, London, United Kingdom
- 2015 :
  - From Here to Eternity, Venus Over Los Angeles, Los Angeles, US
  - Jalousies: Complicités avec Jean Nouvel, Musée de Vence, Vence, France
  - Palace, CAC, Malaga, Spain
  - Soldaten, Christine König Galleria, Viena, Austria
  - Opening of Archives, Video Bureau, Beijing, China
- 2014:
  - Merci, Blondeau & Cie, Geneva, Switzerland
  - Oiseau, Spatiu Intact, Cluj-Napoca, Romania
  - Mon Enfant, Dvir Gallery, Tel Aviv, Israel
  - Solo, Galerie Yvon Lambert, Paris, France
- 2013:
  - Le Vase abominable, David Zwirner, London, United Kingdom
  - L'âge d'or, Mathaf: Arab Museum of Modern Art, Doha, Qatar.
- 2012:
  - Je suis innocent, Centre Georges-Pompidou, Paris, France
  - Who's Afraid of the Big Bad Wolf?, David Zwirner, New York, US
  - Décor: Adel Abdessemed, Musée Unterlinden, Colmar, France.
- 2011: NU, Dvir Gallery, Tel-Aviv, Israel
- 2010: Silent Warriors, Parasol Unit foundation for contemporary art, London, United Kingdom.
- 2009:
  - Le ali di dio, Fondazione Sandretto Re Rebaudengo, Turin, Italy.
  - RIO, David Zwirner, New York, US
- 2008:
  - Situation and Practice, MIT List Visual Arts Center, Cambridge, US.
  - Trust Me, The Common Guild, Glasgow, Scotland.
  - Don't Trust Me, Walter and McBean Galleries, San Francisco Art Institute, San Francisco, US.
  - Drawing for Human Park, Le Magasin - Centre national d'art contemporain de Grenoble, France.
- 2007: Dead or Alive, PS 1 Contemporary Art Center, Long Island City, New York, US.
- 2006 : Practice Zero Tolerance, La Criée, centre d'art contemporain, Rennes et Fonds régional d'art contemporain d'Île-de-France-Le Plateau, Paris, France.
- 2004: Le Citron et le lait, Musée d'art moderne et contemporain de Genève, Geneva, Switzerland.
  - Habibi, Fonds régional d'art contemporain Champagne-Ardenne, Reims, France.
- 2003:
  - Nuit, Galleria Laura Pecci, Milan, Italy
  - Quarta Estacio Benifallet-Vassivière, Centre international d'art et du paysage de l'île de Vassivière, France
- 2002: Adel Abdessemed, Institute of Visual Arts, University of Wisconsin-Milwaukee, Milwaukee, WI, US
- 2001:
  - Adel Abdessemed, Galleria Laura Pecci, Milan, Italy
  - Adel Abdessemed, Project Room, Kunsthalle Bern, Bern, Switzerland

=== Special collaboration ===
- 2015 : Retour à Berratham, Ballet Preljocaj, choreography and staging: Angelin Preljocaj, text: Laurent Mauvignier, scenography: Adel Abdessemed, Cour d'honneur du Palais des papes, Festival d'Avignon, France.

=== Group shows ===
- 2018: Echigo Tsumari Triennale, Japan.
- 2017:
  - Urban Glass Brooklyn, New York, US.
  - 15th Istanbul Biennial, Turkey.
  - Oku-Noto Triennale, Suzu, Japan.
  - Le Mois de la Photo, Montréal, Canada.
  - Pallaksh Pallaksh (I don't know just where I'm going), Dvir Gallery, Tel Aviv, Israel.
  - The Restless Earth: Triennale de Milan, Nicola Trussardi Foundation, Milan, Italy.
- 2016:
  - 30th Anniversary, Alfonso Artiaco Gallery, Naples, Italy.
  - The End of the World, Centro Pecci, Prato, Italy.
  - Miracle Marathon, Serpentine Galleries, Second Home, London, United Kingdom.
  - : Dancing with Myself. Selbstporträt und Selbsterfindung. Werke aus der Sammlung Pinault. Museum Folkwang, Essen, Germany.
  - The New Human, Moderna Museet, Stockholm, Sweden.
  - Cher(e)s ami(e)s. Nouvelle présentation des collections contemporaines. Hommage aux donateurs, Musée national d'art moderne – Centre Pompidou, Paris, France.
  - Souviens-toi du temps présent, Centre d'art Le Lait, Albi, France.
  - Money, Good and Evil: A Visual History of the Economy, Staatliche Kunsthalle Baden-Baden in collaboration with the Casino, Baden-Baden, Germany.
  - Magie und Macht. Von fliegenden Teppichen und Drohnen, MARTa Herford, Germany.
  - De Warhol à Basquiat. Les chefs d'oeuvre de la collection Lambert, Musée de Vence –Fondation Émile Hugues, Vence, France.
  - Je Tu Il Elle, Dvir Gallery, Brussels, Belgium.
  - Do It in Arabic, Sharjah Art Foundation's Bait Al Shamsi, United Arab Emirates.
- 2015:
  - Retour sur l'abîme – L'art à l'épreuve du génocide, Musées de Belfort, France.
  - Drawing: The Bottom Line, S.M.A.K. Museum of Contemporary Art, Gent, Belgium.
  - PICASSO.MANIA, Grand Palais, Paris, France.
  - Le Cambrioleur, Riga Art Space, Riga, Latvia.
  - Patrice Chéreau / Un musée imaginaire, Collection Lambert, Avignon, France.
  - 56th Venice Biennial.
- 2014:
  - About Town, Ikon in partnership with Hippodrome Plus, Birmingham Hippodrome, Birmingham, United Kingdom.
  - The Desire for Freedom, Art in Europe since 1945, MOCAK Museum of Contemporary Art in Kraków, Kraków, Poland.
- Narcisse, l'image dans l'onde, Fondation François Schneider, Wattwiller, France.
  - Milch / Lait / Latte, Musée d'art du Valais, Sion, Switzerland.
  - Made by... Feito por Brasileiros, Cidade Matarazzo, São Paulo, Brazil.
  - Grandeur, Museum Beelden Aan Zee, The Hague, Holland.
  - Utopian Days-Freedom, Total Museum of Contemporary Art, Seoul, South Korea
  - La disparition des lucioles, Collection Lambert, Prison Sainte-Anne, Avignon, France.
  - Entre-Temps, l'artiste narrateur, Chengdu MOCA Museum of Contemporary Art, Chengdu, China.
  - Myth / History: Yuz Collection of Contemporary Art, Yuz Museum, Shanghai, China.
  - Ravaged, Art and Culture in Times of Con ict, Museum Leuven, Leuven, Belgium.
  - Lampedusa : Dessins d'Adel Abdessemed & Dessins anciens, Saint Honoré Art Consulting, Paris, France.
  - Futbol: The Beautiful Game, Los Angeles County Museum of Art, Los Angeles, US.
- 2013: Prima Materia, François Pinault Foundation, Venice, Italy.
- 2012:
  - La Triennale, Intense Proximité, Paris, France.
  - Explosion! Painting as Action, Moderna Museet, Stockholm, Sweden.
- 2011: Seeing is Believing, KW Institute for Contemporary Art, Berlin, Germany.
- 2010: Triennale Aichi, Nagoya, Japan.
- 2009:
  - 10th Havana Biennial, Cuba.
  - Mapping the Studio; Artists from the François Pinault Foundation, Palazzo Grassi and Punta della Dogana, Venice, Italy.
  - Transmission Interrupted, Modern Art Oxford, United Kingdom.
- 2008:
  - Traces du sacré, Centre Pompidou, Paris, France.
  - 7th Gwangju Biennale.
  - Airs de Paris, Centre Pompidou, Paris, France.
  - 52nd Venice Biennale, Italy.
- 2006: 27th São Paulo Biennial, Brazil.
- 2003: 49th Venice Biennale, Italy.
- 2001: Yokohama Triennale, Japan.
- 2000: Manifesta 3, Ljubljana, Slovenia.

== Collections ==
- Musée d'art moderne de la Ville de Paris, France
- Musée national d'art moderne Georges-Pompidou, Paris, France
- Fonds régional d'art contemporain, Champagne-Ardennes, Reims, France
- Collection Budi Tek, Shanghai, China
- Fondation François Pinault, Venice, Italy
- Musée d'art moderne et contemporain, Geneva, Switzerland
- Bold Tendencies, London, United Kingdom

== Bibliography ==
=== Catalogues ===
- Adel Abdessemed: Otchi Tchiornie / L'Antidote. Lyon, Musée d'Art Contemporain, 2018. Texts by Eric de Chassey, Denis Gielen, Donatien Grau, Mark Nash, Paul Ardenne, Kamel Daoud, Thierry Raspail, Michele Robecchi and Octavio Zaya.
- Adel Abdessemed: Conflit. Montréal, Musée des Beaux-Arts, 2017. Texts by Nathalie Bondil and Vincent Lavoie.
- Adel Abdessemed: Bristow, published by Hannah Barry, Donatien Grau, Hans Ulrich Obrist, London, 2016
- Adel Abdessemed : Works 1988-2015, Foreword by Pier Luigi Tazzi. Introduction by Schwed. Texts by Hans Belting, Giovanni Careri, Julia Kristeva, Tom McDonough, Hans Ulrich Obrist, Jacques Rancière, et al. Koenig Books, London, 2016
- Adel Abdessemed Par, Paris, Manuella éditions, 2015. Texts by Hans Belting, Emanuele Coccia, Élisabeth de Fontenay, Julia Kristeva, Tom McDonough, Philippe-Alain Michaud, Hans Ulrich Obrist, Jacques Rancière, Shva Salhoov
- Adel Abdessemed. Jalousies – complicités avec Jean Nouvel, Paris, Éditions de l'Amateur / Collection Lambert, 2015. Correspondence between Jean Nouvel and Adel Abdessemed.
- Adel Abdessemed. From Here to Eternity. New York, Venus Over Los Angeles, 2015. Text by Francesco Bonami.
- Adel Abdessemed. Dessins. Paris, Éditions Dilecta, 2015. Text by Jean-Jacques Aillagon.
- Adel Abdessemed. Palace. Malaga, CAC, 2015. Texts by Fernando Francés and Alberto Ruiz Samaniego.
- Adel Abdessemed. Solo.Paris, Yvon Lambert, 2014. Letters from Hélène Cixous to Adel Abdessemed.
- Adel Abdessemed. Mon Enfant. Tel-Aviv, Dvir Gallery, 2014. Text by Shva Saloon.
- Adel Abdessemed. L'âge d'or. Doha, Mathaf: Arab Museum of Modern Art / Silvana Editoriale, 2013. Texts by Abdellah Taïa, Pier Luigi Tazzi, Angela Mengoni and interview with Hans Ulrich Obrist.
- Adel Abdessemed Je suis innocent. Paris, Centre Pompidou / Steidl, 2012. Foreword by Alfred Pacquement. Texts by Emmanuel Alloa, Patricia Falguières, Pamela M. Lee, Tom McDonough and Philippe-Alain Michaud.
- Adel Abdessemed, Dead or Alive. New York, 2008. Contributions by Alanna Heiss and Neville Wakefield.
- Adel Abdessemed, Les ai PS1 MoMA, les de dieu / Le ali di dio. Turin, Fondazione Sandretto Re Rebaudengo, 2009. Contributions by Francesco Bonami, Edi Muka and Massimiliano Gioni.
- Adel Abdessemed, Situation and Practice. Cambridge, MA, MIT Press, 2009. Contributions by Jane Farver, Tom McDonough, and Noam Chomsky.
- Adel Abdessemed. Zürich, JRP Ringier, 2010, text by Larys Frogier.(ISBN 978-3-03764-109-5)
- Silent Warriors, London/Cologne, Parasol Unit/König, 2010. Contributions by Ziba Ardalan, Gilanne Tawadros and Guy Tortosa.
- Décor. Paris, Éditions Xavier Barral, 2012. Contributions by François Pinault, Jean-Jacques Aillagon, Frédérique Goerig-Hergott, Eric de Chassey and Giovanni Careri
- Adel Abdessemed Je suis innocent. Cologne/Paris, Steidl/Centre Pompidou, 2012. Contributions by Philippe-Alain Michaud, Emmanuel Alloa, Hou Hanru, Pamela M. Lee, Tom McDonough and Patricia Falguières
- L'âge d'or. Mathaf/Silvana, Doha/Milan, 2013 : book designed by M/M (Paris). Contributions by Abdellah Karroum, Pier Luigi Tazzi, Angela Mengoni, Abdellah Taïa, and an interview with Hans Ulrich Obrist.

=== Collaborations ===
- Hélène Cixous, Les Sans Arche d'Adel Abdessemed, Art et Artistes Galimard, Paris, 2018
- Adel Abdessemed and Véronique Yersin, Charbon, édition Macula, Paris, 2017
- Hélène Cixous, Correspondance avec le mur, Galilée, Paris, 2017
- Adel Abdessemed and Adonis, La Peau du chaos. Correspondance, Actes Sud, Paris, 2015
- Hélène Cixous, Corollaires d'un vœu, Abstracts et Brèves Chroniques du temps, Galilée, Paris, 2015
- Adel Abdessemed and Hélène Cixous, Insurrection de la poussière, Galilée, Paris, 2013
- Hélène Cixous, Ayaï. Le cri de la littérature. Accompagné d'Adel Abdessemed, Galilée, Paris, 2013
- Adel Abdessemed and Adonis, Le Livre des AA, Yvon Lambert, Paris, 2014

== See also ==
- Headbutt
- List of Algerian artists
