= Monument to Viktor Ponedelnik =

The monument to Viktor Ponedelnik (Rostov-on-Don)
- Памятник Виктору Понедельнику (Ростов-на-Дону)
- Interactive map of The monument to Viktor Ponedelnik (Rostov-on-Don)

The monument to Viktor Ponedelnik (or sculpture "The Footballer"), a bronze sculptural composition, was installed near the stadium Olimp-2 in Rostov-on-Don in honor to the footballer Viktor Ponedelnik, who scored the "golden goal" in the final of the 1960 European Nations' Cup.

== History ==
In Rostov-on-Don, on the initiative of the Ministry of Sports of the region, a contest was organized to create a sculpture of the footballer Viktor Ponedelnik.

The creation of the bronze sculpture took two months, from September to November 2013. The cost of materials was estimated at 750 thousand rubles, though the sculptor and casters worked for free. The sculpture is 2 meters high.

The Don sports minister declared that the installation and the opening of the monument would coincide with the day when the first match of FC Rostov in the UEFA Europa League would take place. It was decided to install the monument near the stadium Olympus-2. The opening of the monument to footballer Victor Ponedelnik, which is also often called the sculpture "The Footballer", was held on August 28, 2015.
