= Tom Maley (sculptor) =

English sculptor

Glo-Bed-Rail by Tom Maley

Tom Maley is an English sculptor from North East England whose site specific and publicly commissioned sculptures are found in and around the region.

Born in Stakeford, Northumberland, among his notable works are statues of people related to association football; 1996– Jackie Milburn, 2004 Wilf Mannion, and 2012 Bobby Robson. He has also produced a bronze statue of the Unknown Soldier, on display in Ashington town centre, a contemporary statue of Theseus and a glass fibre composite and steel work, "Two Crows on a Crankshaft", at Woodhorn Colliery Museum.
