= Brother Walfrid =

Irish Marist Brother and founder of Celtic F.C. (1840–1915)

Brother Walfrid F.M.S.
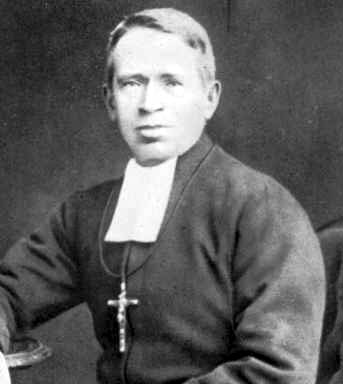
- Brother Walfrid, c. 1870
- Native name: Aindreas Ó Céirín
- Church: Catholic Church

Personal details
- Born: Andrew Kerins; 18 May 1840 Ballymote, Sligo, Ireland
- Died: 17 April 1915 (aged 74) Dumfries, Scotland
- Buried: Mount St. Michael Cemetery

Andrew Kerins (Irish: Aindreas Ó Céirín; 18 May 1840 – 17 April 1915), known by his religious name Brother Walfrid, was an Irish Marist Brother who is best remembered for being the founder of the Scottish football club Celtic.

== Life ==
Kerins was born of John Kerins and Elizabeth Flynn in Ballymote, a village in south County Sligo in Connacht in the northwest of Ireland. His ancestors, the Ó Céirín (later anglicised as "Kerins"), were anciently Gaelic lords of Ciarraige Locha na nÁirne, with a long history in County Mayo.

At the age of 15, he immigrated to Glasgow on a coal boat, where he found a job in the railway industry.

He studied teaching and in 1864 joined the Marist Brothers teaching order, where he would spend four years at the order's house in Beaucamps, and would take on the name Brother Walfrid.

He returned to Glasgow and taught at St. Mary's School and the Sacred Heart School, where he was appointed headmaster of the latter in 1874. He also helped found St. Joseph's College, Dumfries.

In 1887, he founded Celtic Football Club as a means of raising funds for the poor and deprived in the East End of Glasgow.

In 1892, Walfrid was sent by his religious order to Spitalfields in London's East End. Here he continued his work, organising football matches for and showing great kindness to the barefoot Catholic children in the districts of Bethnal Green and Bow. The charity established by Walfrid was named The Poor Children's Dinner Table.

He passed away on 17 April 1915. Walfrid is buried in the Mount St. Michael Cemetery in Dumfries.

== Commemoration ==
A commemorative sculpture of Walfrid was erected outside Celtic Park on 5 November 2005.

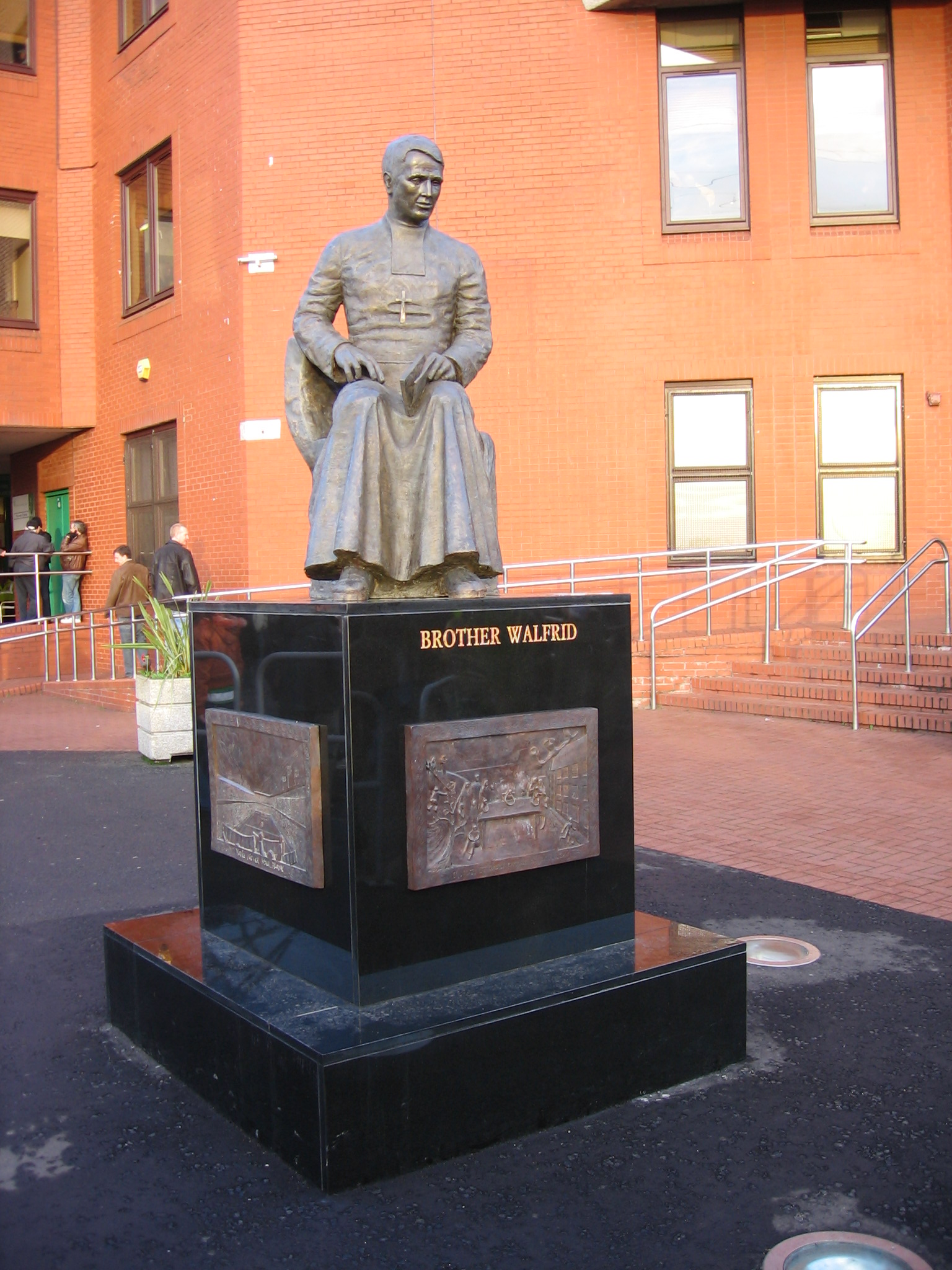
Brother Walfrid sculpture at Celtic Park

The 3.2-metre-high (10 ft) sculpture by Kate Robinson was cast in bronze and its pedestal carved from granite. The statue cost £30,000 which was funded entirely by donations organised by the Brother Walfrid Committee, including £5,000 from then chairman of the club, Brian Quinn. The veil for the unveiling ceremony was made by workshops in fourteen schools and community centres throughout Glasgow. Funded by Sense Over Sectarianism, artists worked with young people to create images of footballers and football strips which were digitally printed onto the veil itself. The unveiling was performed by former assistant manager and player Sean Fallon, himself a native of Sligo. The ceremony was attended by the Archbishop of Glasgow, the Most Reverend Mario Conti who blessed the statue, several thousand fans and former Celtic and Rangers captains and managers Billy McNeil and John Greig.

New music for the ceremony, called Walfrid at the Gates of Paradise, was composed by relative James MacMillan. Archbishop Conti presented club officials with a Celtic cross from the church where Celtic were established, Saint Mary's, Calton, the second oldest church in the Archdiocese of Glasgow. After the ceremony, the Celtic Charity Fund presented a cheque of £5,000 for St Mary's, to help the restoration fund for the church and to recognise the important link between club and community.

A further sculpture, a bust of Brother Walfrid, commemorating his links with his home town of Ballymote, was unveiled in the public park there in 2005.

== See also ==
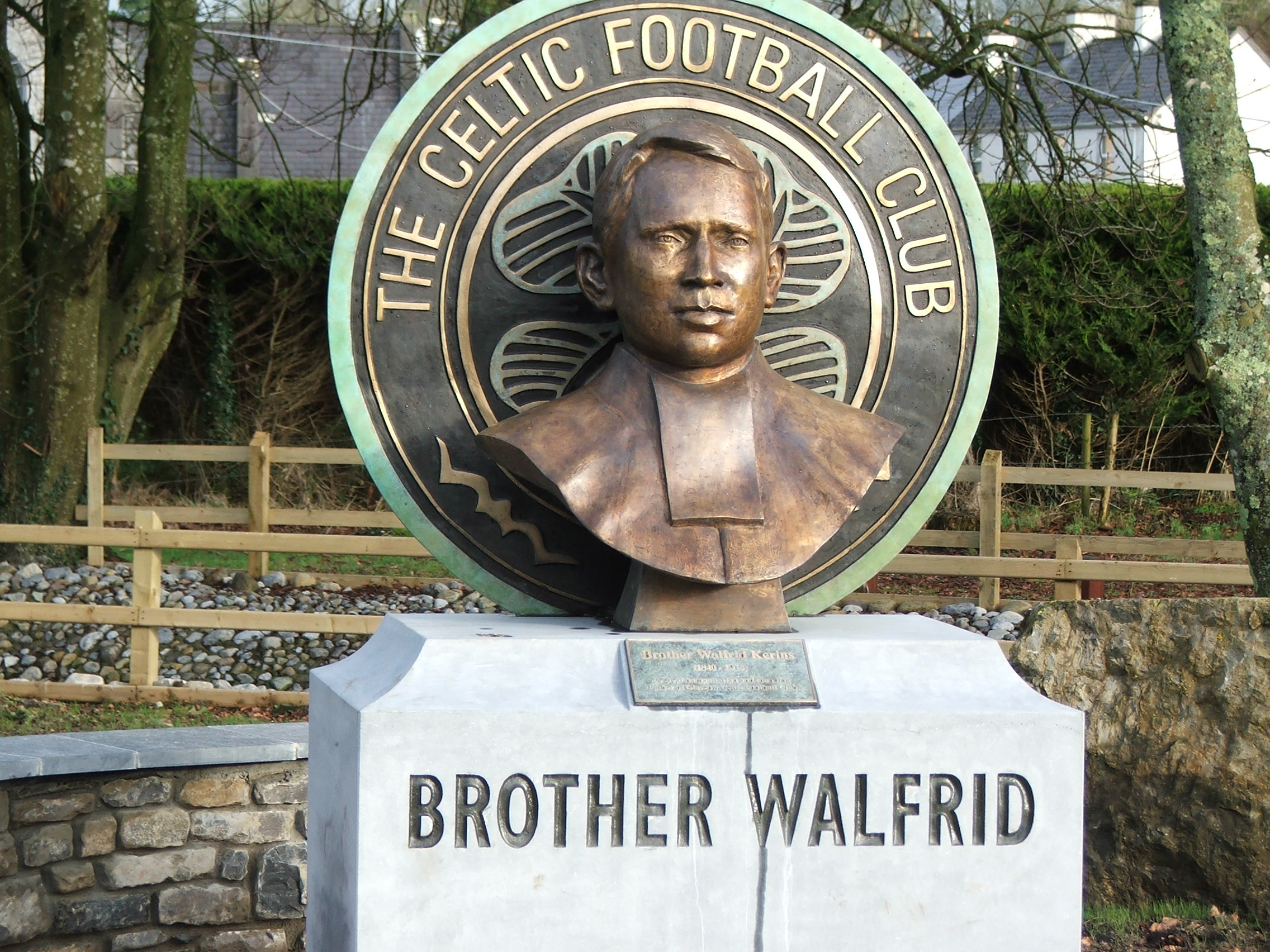
Commemorative sculpture in Ballymote

- Marist Brothers
- History of Celtic F.C.
