= Kate Robinson (sculptor) =

- Known for: Sculpture
- Notable work: Public art
- Movement: Public art

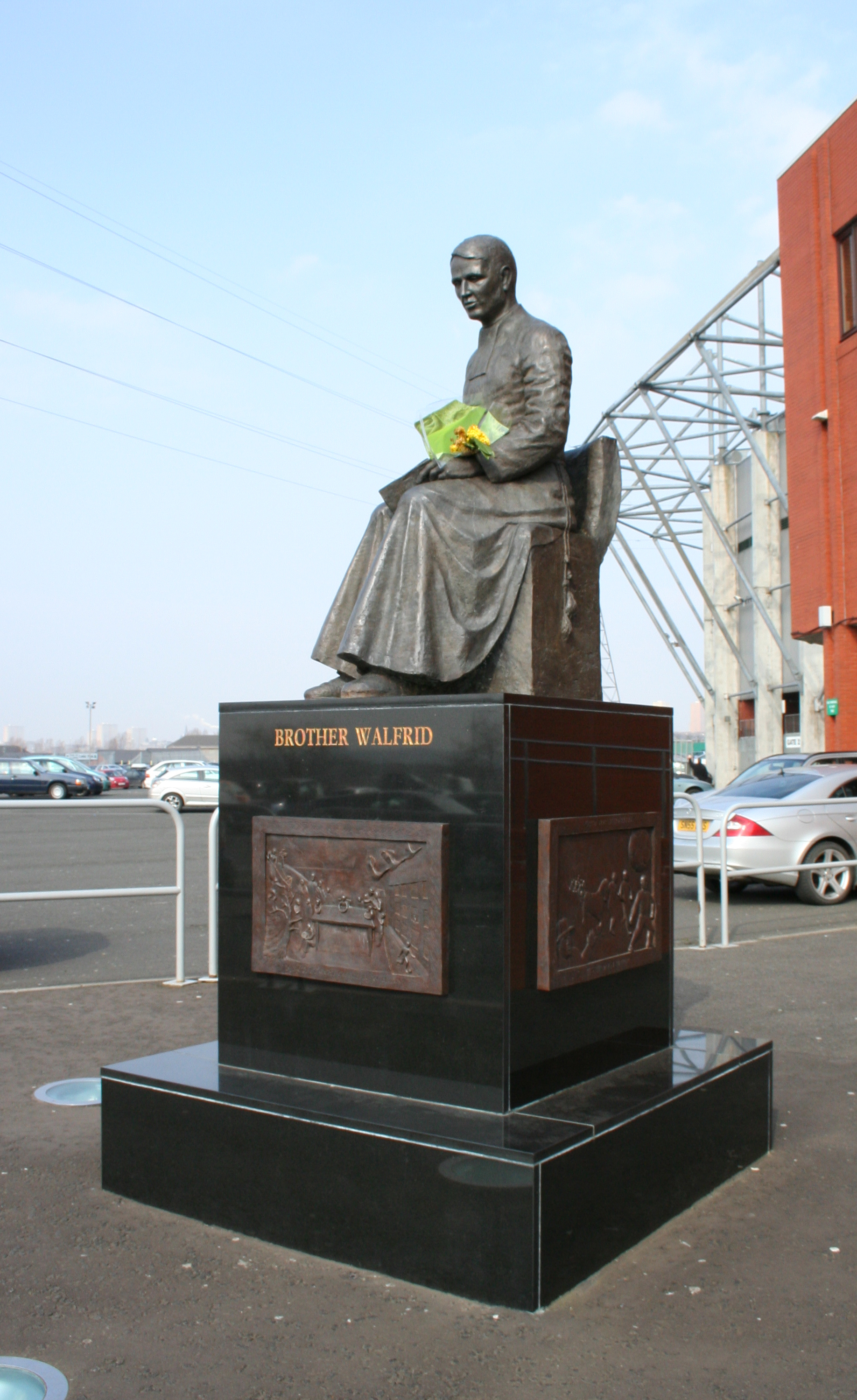
Robinson's statue of Brother Walfrid at Celtic Park

Kate Robinson is a sculptor and writer.

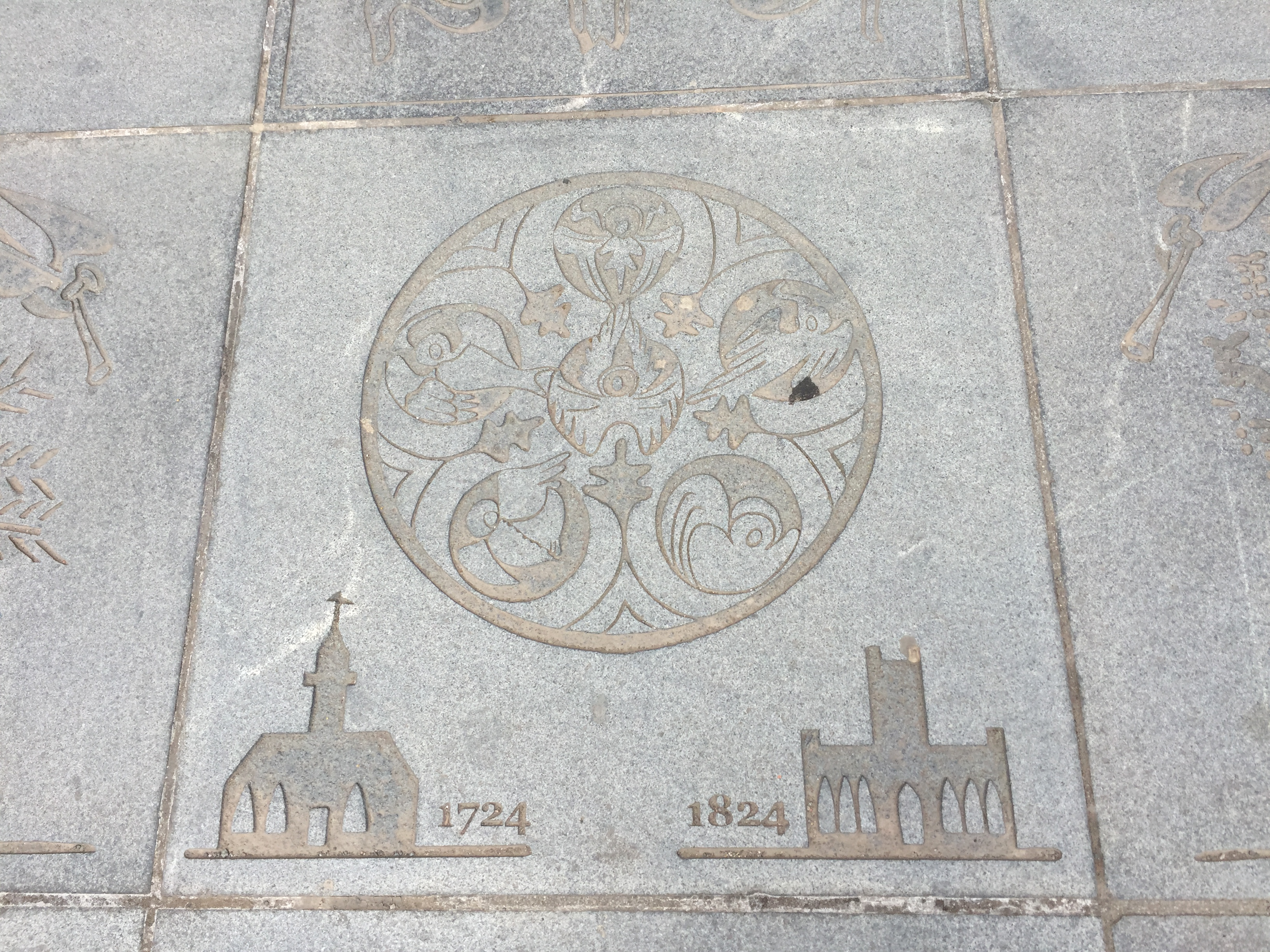
One of several floor etchings outside the Ramshorn Theatre in Glasgow

She obtained a 1st class BA (Hons) in Fine Art at Glasgow School of Art, completing her Phd at University of Glasgow, published by Dunedin Academic Press in 2006 as The Whirlpool of Artifice. Amongst her awards are a Sense Over Sectarianism Award for the Brother Walfrid Veil; Guardian/Modern Painters prize for Writing on Art; Robert Graves Poetry Prize shortlist; Words & Women Award; Hope Scott Award.

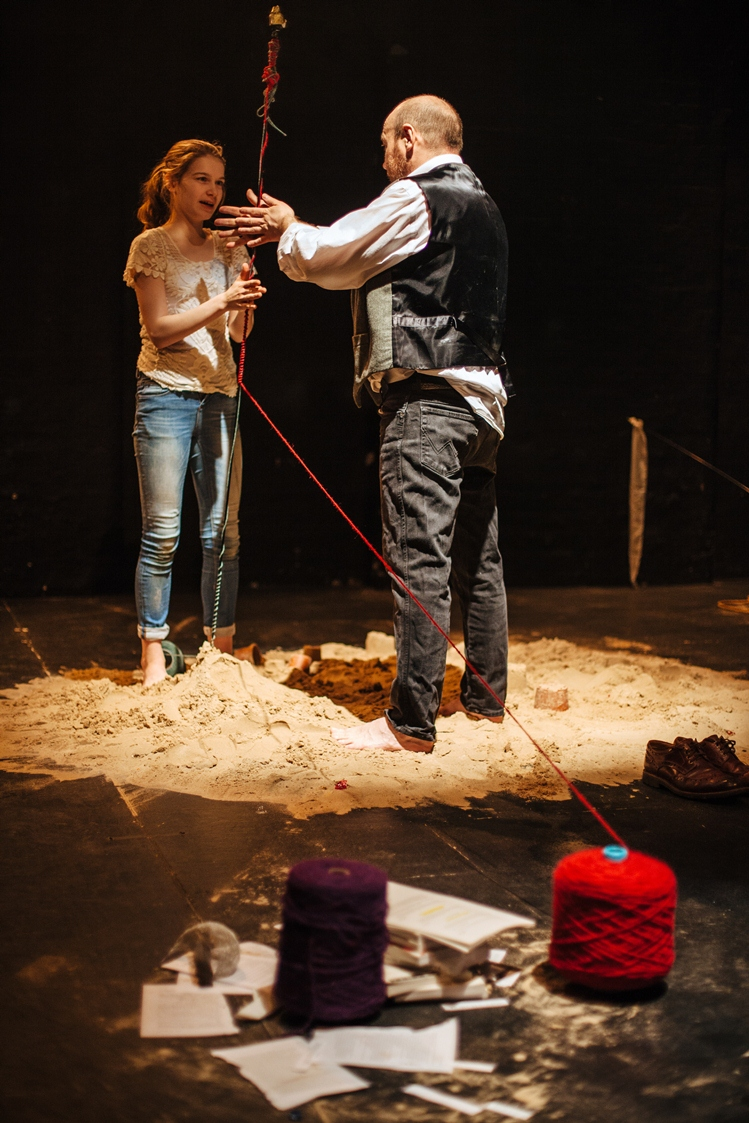
Annabel MacDonald and David Walker perform the dual language play Uainead / Degree of Greeness at Tramway IV

Woman Man Sun Moon was unveiled next to the M8 motorway in North Lanarkshire, commissioned by The Co-op group and Prologis. Gie Me Ae Spark O' Nature's Fire is a series of artworks integrated into the award-winning new Johnstone Town Hall inspired by the poetry of Robert Burns. The Very Atom is Light Energy and The Govan Timeline are etchings engraved into paving illustrating the history of Govan. Granite etchings in the pavement outside the Ramshorn Theatre in the Merchant City area of Glasgow describe the history of the church.

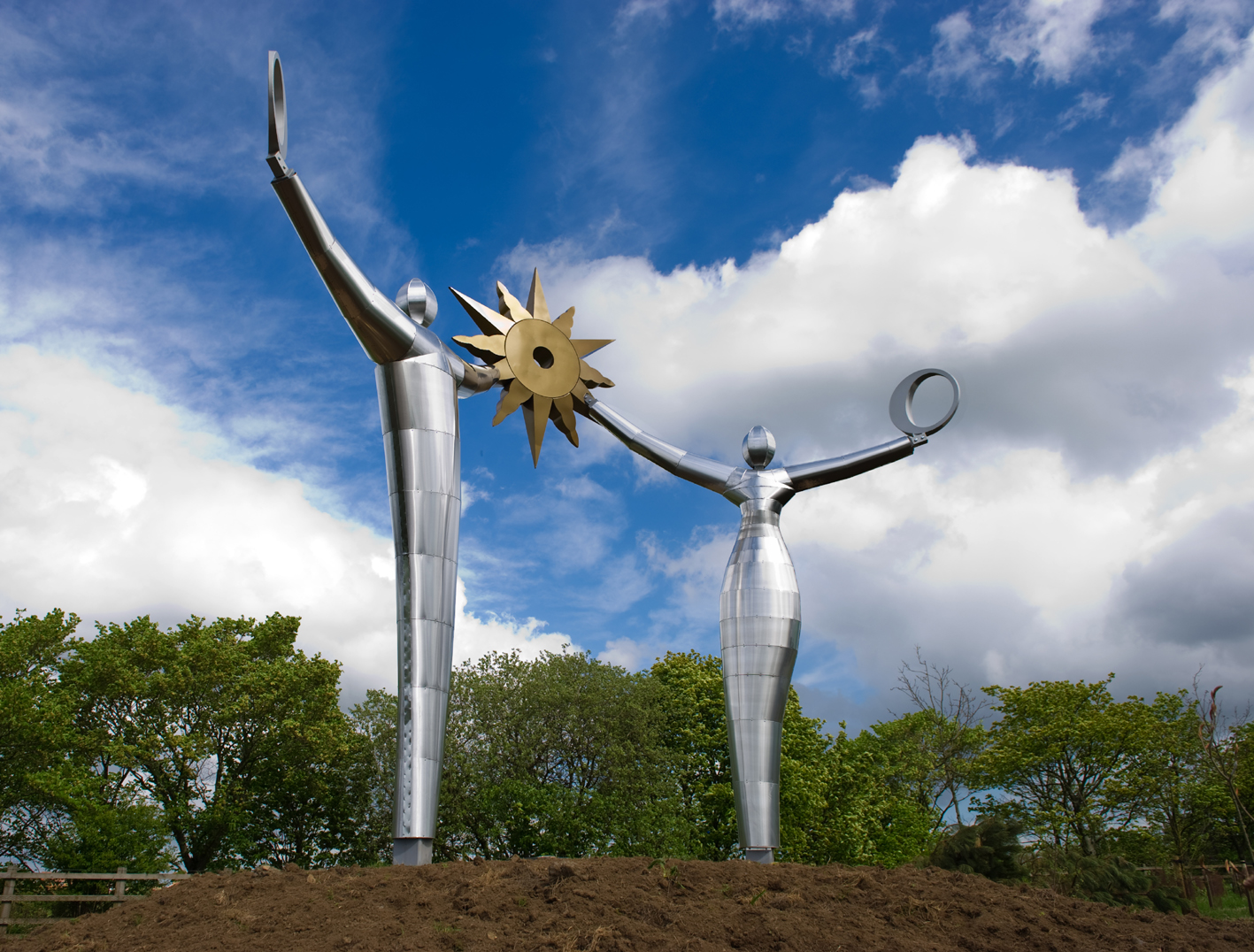
Sculpture fabricated in aluminium

Land art includes transient drawings in coloured sand at sites of Scottish archaeological significance for the University of Glasgow and the co-direction of a sand sculpture festival in the centre of Glasgow attracting an audience in excess of 80,000. Directing for theatre and film includes Listen If... for the Yermilov Centre, Ukraine, Uainead / Degree of Greeness commissioned by the National Theatre of Scotland and Gaelic Arts and Moot commissioned by BBC and LUX.

Public art commissions include statues of Jimmy Johnstone and the founder of Celtic football club, Brother Walfrid at Celtic Park, Glasgow. The Brother Walfrid Veil covered the sculpture at the unveiling ceremony printed with hundreds of drawings of footballers by children from different faith communities.
