= Kunduz airlift =

2001 Pakistani evacuation of Taliban militants in Afghanistan

- Part of the War in Afghanistan (2001–2021)
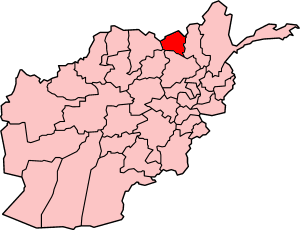
- Kunduz District shown within Afghanistan
| Date | November 2001 |
| Location | Kunduz, Afghanistan |
| Result | Airlift did not take place (American and Pakistani claim); Unknown number of Taliban, al-Qaeda, Pakistani ISI, and Pakistani military personnel evacuated to Pakistan (other claims) |

The Kunduz airlift, also called the Airlift of Evil, refers to the evacuation by Pakistan of hundreds of top commanders and members of the Taliban and al-Qaeda as well as their Pakistani advisors (which included agents of the Inter-Services Intelligence and personnel of the Pakistani military) from the city of Kunduz, Afghanistan, in November 2001. The incident reportedly occurred just before the Siege of Kunduz, which saw the city fall into the hands of the Northern Alliance and the United States during the opening phase of the War in Afghanistan. From Kunduz, the militants were taken to Chitral in Khyber Pakhtunkhwa and Gilgit in the Northern Areas. However, both the United States and Pakistan have denied that the airlift ever took place; Richard Myers, the then-chairman of the Joint Chiefs of Staff, said that the Kunduz Airport had been disabled by American bombing raids; Donald Rumsfeld, the then-Secretary of Defense, stated on 2 December 2001 that "neither Pakistan nor any other country flew any planes into Afghanistan to evacuate anybody".

== Background ==
According to the Los Angeles Times, during the siege of Kunduz, U.S. and Northern Alliance forces (led by Mohammad Daud Daud and Abdul Rashid Dostum) had declared that they would treat foreign fighters of the Taliban (including Pakistani military advisers as well as Pakistani and Arab volunteers) more severely than their Afghan counterparts. The Northern Alliance had earlier witnessed Pakistani and Arab involvement in several massacres perpetrated by the Taliban in Afghanistan. Pakistani leaders feared that revenge killings of Pakistanis in Kunduz could lead to unrest and instability in their country and therefore decided to evacuate their forces before the U.S. and Northern Alliance ground forces moved into Kunduz.

== Event ==
According to former American diplomat Peter Tomsen, Pakistani President Pervez Musharraf called U.S. President George W. Bush on or about 18 November and requested permission for an airlift. Bush and Vice President Dick Cheney approved, but most cabinet members were not informed. A CIA official interviewed by Seymour Hersh claimed that United States Central Command set up a special air corridor within Afghanistan, "to help insure the safety of the Pakistani rescue flights." The justification for the operation was that Pakistan had many military and intelligence officers fighting with the Taliban, and feared for their safety after Kunduz fell. Pakistan also hoped that evacuated Taliban leadership figures could play a role in the postwar Afghan government. However, once the airlift began, additional Taliban and al-Qaeda members were included.

Estimates of the number evacuated vary. Carlotta Gall, citing Afghan intelligence officials who monitored Taliban radio traffic during the siege, put the number at 2,000. An American intelligence analyst interviewed by Ahmed Rashid estimated the number at "certainly hundreds and perhaps as many as one thousand people," while Brajesh Mishra, India's National Security Advisor, believed that 5,000 Pakistanis and Taliban were evacuated. Afghan President Hamid Karzai said only that "even the Americans did not know who got away".

== Revelation ==
The revelation that the U.S. had allegedly acquiesced to the escape of individuals including the top leadership of the Taliban and Al Qaeda was a controversial and politically contentious topic within the United States and her aligned partners, that sparked off a debate in the western media and elicited denials of knowledge of this event from top Bush administration officials including Secretary of Defense Donald Rumsfeld. Although numerous articles mentioning such an ongoing airlift of Pakistani and other combatants from Kunduz appeared around that time in several international newspapers (such as The New York Times, The Independent and The Guardian), the first reference to the specific term Airlift of Evil appeared in a column on the website of the MSNBC news network. The airlift was later detailed in the BBC documentary Secret Pakistan: Double Cross and Backlash.

General Richard Myers, Chairman of the Chiefs of Staff, stated that the Kunduz airfield had been disabled by United States attacks. Although part of the field could be used, the runway was not long enough for transport aircraft to takeoff or land.
