= Afghan Massacre: The Convoy of Death =

2002 documentary directed by Jamie Doran

- Directed by: Jamie Doran

Production
- Producers: Jamie Doran, David McDougall
- Cinematography: Najibullah Quraishi, Mark Oulson Jenkins, Steen Erikson
- Editor: Franco Pistillo
- Running time: 50 minutes

Original release
- Release: 11 November 2002

Afghan Massacre: The Convoy of Death (earlier title: Massacre at Mazar) is a 2002 documentary by Irish filmmaker Jamie Doran and Afghan journalist Najibullah Quraishi. It documents alleged war crimes committed by National Islamic Movement of Afghanistan, a faction of the Northern Alliance under the command of General Abdul Rashid Dostum, against captured Taliban fighters. The Taliban fighters, who had surrendered to Dostum's troops after the November 2001 siege of Kunduz, were transported to Sheberghan prison in sealed containers. Human rights groups estimate that several hundred of them died during and after this transit. The documentary presents testimony from interviewees stating that American military personnel were present at and complicit in some of the alleged war crimes, which became known as the Dasht-i-Leili massacre.

A short early version of the documentary was shown to the European and German parliaments in June 2002, causing widespread concern in Europe. Against protests from the United States government, the completed documentary was shown later that year on many countries' national television channels, including German, British, Italian and Australian television. The programme was not screened in the US and received no US media coverage. A Newsweek report in August 2002, based on a leaked UN memo, did confirm some of the details in Doran's documentary, as well as the presence of mass graves in the Dasht-i-Leili desert, but made no mention of the documentary.

In July 2009, Barack Obama, the president of the United States, ordered a probe into allegations that the Bush administration had resisted efforts to have the massacre investigated.

== Synopsis ==
The documentary is largely based on the work of award-winning Afghan journalist Najibullah Quraishi. In late 2001, around 8,000 Taliban fighters, including Chechens, Pakistanis and Uzbeks as well as suspected members of al-Qaeda, surrendered to the forces of Northern Alliance General Abdul Rashid Dostum, a US ally in the war in Afghanistan, after the siege of Kunduz. The program recounts that several hundred of the prisoners, among them American John Walker Lindh, were taken to Qala-i-Jangi, a fort near Mazar-i-Sharif, where they staged a bloody uprising which took several days to quell. It shows footage of Walker Lindh being interrogated by CIA man Johnny Micheal Spann, taken just hours before the latter was killed. The programme describes how the remaining 7,500 prisoners were loaded into sealed shipping containers for transport to Sheberghan prison. The journey was to last several days in some cases; many of the prisoners did not survive it.

The film shows an interview with a commander who was one of the chief negotiators of the surrender, saying that several thousand of the soldiers who surrendered are now unaccounted for. He says the prisoners had given themselves up on the understanding that they would be allowed to go home if they gave up their weapons or – in the case of al-Qaeda and foreign fighters – that they would be treated in accordance with UN conventions. Afghan witnesses presented in Afghan Massacre: The Convoy of Death, their faces and voices digitally disguised, recount in sometimes harrowing and graphic detail how most of the prisoners died.

The witnesses state the sealed containers held 200 to 300 men each. They say that when the men in the containers began crying out for air and water, air holes were shot into the sides of the containers, killing several of those inside. A soldier is asked in the documentary: "You specifically shot holes into containers? Who gave you those orders?" He replies: "The commanders ordered me to hit the containers to make holes for ventilation and because of that some of the prisoners were killed."

A truck driver says that half of the people he transported in a container were dead upon arrival. An Afghan taxi driver tells Doran of a visit to a petrol station: "At the time they were taking prisoners from Qaala Zeini to Scheberghan. I went to fill my car with petrol. I smelled something strange and asked the petrol attendant where the smell was coming from. He said 'look behind you', and there were trucks with containers fixed on them. I was surprised. I saw something very strange. Blood was leaking from the containers – they were full of dead bodies."

Reports from survivors of the transports speak of bound men, locked up in the containers for several days without food or drink, having resorted to licking the sweat of each other's bodies, even biting into other prisoners' bodies in their desperation to obtain fluids from any source. The documentary quotes the account an Afghan ex-soldier gave to a Pakistani newspaper, describing what he experienced when the containers were opened: "I shall never forget the sensation as long as I live. It was the most revolting and powerful stench you can imagine: a mixture of faeces, urine, blood, vomit and rotting flesh. It was a smell to make you forget all other smells you have experienced in your life."

Another driver states that he was asked to drive his truck, carrying a container with about 300 men, into the desert; he says those who had not died of asphyxiation were shot, in the presence of 30 or 40 US soldiers watching. The driver put the number of containers he saw in the desert at 25 to 30. Several of the interviewed people claim that US personnel were aware of what was happening to the prisoners after their arrival at Sheberghan, and that some played an active role in the torture and murder of prisoners.

Najibullah Quraishi states in the film that he saw a video showing American Special Forces personnel observing the dumping of bodies into mass graves in the desert; he says that as he was copying the tape, he was attacked and nearly beaten to death. The film shows Quraishi after his recovery from the beating receiving the Rory Peck Award in London for his camera work in Mazar-i-Sharif. The documentary concludes by saying that several witnesses to the events, including some of those who participated in the programme, had since been killed.

== Reception ==
In June 2002, having learnt that the grave site was being disturbed, Doran showed a 20-minute version of the film, under the title Massacre at Mazar, to the European Parliament, the German Parliament and various media representatives. The screenings resulted in widespread calls for investigations in German, French and British newspapers, including The Guardian, Le Monde, Süddeutsche Zeitung, Die Welt and The Scotsman, which in June 2002 ran a story entitled "U.S. Had Role in Taliban Prisoner Deaths". Human rights lawyer Andrew McEntee, a former Amnesty International chairman, called for forensic pathologists to be dispatched as a matter of urgency.

In response, the Pentagon released a statement, saying that US Central Command had made an "informal inquiry" and that "U.S. Central Command looked into it a few months ago, when allegations first surfaced when there were graves discovered in the area of Sherberghan prison. They looked into it and did not substantiate any knowledge, presence or participation of US service members." No US papers or networks reported on the documentary and the allegations made in it. According to spokespersons for Physicians for Human Rights, their enquiries were met with "blanket denials" from the Pentagon, who said "Nothing happened".

In August 2002, a Newsweek report based on a leaked UN memo stated that a 1 acre (0.40 ha) mass grave had been discovered. A six-yard trial trench, dug at the edge of the site, unearthed 15 bodies. The Newsweek report made no mention of Doran's film, even though Doran was interviewed for the story, but confirmed details present in Doran's account, such as truck drivers being forbidden to help those perishing in the containers, and the accounts of bound prisoners dying of thirst trying to survive by licking the sweat off each other's bodies. Unlike Doran, however, Newsweek stated that "nothing Newsweek learned suggests that American forces had advance knowledge of the killings, witnessed the prisoners being stuffed into unventilated trucks, or were in a position to prevent that." Commenting on the close involvement of US soldiers with General Dostum, and the sensitivity of any related investigation, Newsweek quoted Jennifer Leaning, a professor at the Harvard School of Public Health, who had gone to Afghanistan as an investigator for Physicians for Human Rights: "The issue nobody wants to discuss is the involvement of U.S. forces. U.S. forces were in the area at the time. What did the U.S. know, and when and where – and what did they do about it?"

General Dostum commented that there were only 200 deaths, and that the prisoners had died prior to the transfer. Director Jamie Doran said, "They're hiding behind a wall of secrecy." In a Reuters interview, Doran said that the Pentagon did not respond to his repeated requests for a comment on his film. Doran added that he "would like to see the American authorities agree to a proper investigation. They have nothing to fear from the truth. I have the feeling they hope the story will go away."

"It is a mystery to us why a respected television channel is showing a documentary in which the facts are completely wrong and which unfairly depicts the U.S. mission in Afghanistan."

— Larry Schwartz, U.S. Department of State

The completed film Afghan Massacre: The Convoy of Death was shown on national German television in December 2002. US Department of State spokesmen protested the screening of the film in Germany, stating, "The claims are completely false that American soldiers were involved in the torture, execution and disappearance of Taliban prisoners. In no way did U.S. troops participate or witness any human rights violations." The day before the programme's scheduled broadcast date, the German NDR network issued a press release, stating they had decided to ignore protests from the US Department of State and were going ahead with the broadcast. The NDR press release said, "All eyewitnesses shown in the documentary on events in the Sheberghan prison and at the Dasht-i-Leili mass grave site agree in reporting that American soldiers were present at both of these sites. U.S. Department of State spokesman Larry Schwartz was reported by dpa to have explained that the statements in the NDR documentary were 'completely wrong and already disproved'. This is in direct contradiction with the Pentagon's statement that so far there has been no investigation of events by the U.S. military. Full resolution of the matter would require an internal investigation by the American Ministry of Defense and an exhumation of the mass graves, autopsies of the corpses and the identification of the dead by the UNHCR." Commenting on the German broadcast of the documentary, Schwartz stated, "It is a mystery to us why a respected television channel is showing a documentary in which the facts are completely wrong and which unfairly depicts the U.S. mission in Afghanistan."

The documentary was broadcast in 50 countries, among others by the Italian network RAI, the British Channel 5 and on Australian national television. At a time when the documentary had been broadcast throughout Europe, had outraged human rights groups and led to widespread calls for war crime investigations, it had yet to be seen in the United States, because corporate media outlets in the US would not touch it. The film's audio portion was eventually broadcast in the US by the Democracy Now! radio programme, on 23/26 May 2003. The documentary was not broadcast by any television channel in the United States and came to be included in Project Censored's list of top 25 censored news stories. Speaking on the Democracy Now! radio program, Doran quoted US Department of State official Larry Schwartz as saying, "You have to understand, we're involved, we're in touch with the national [newspapers] on a daily basis – this story won't run, even if it's true.'" Doran says the response from television people in the US was, "Not now, Jamie."

=== July 2009: Obama orders investigation ===
Six years later, on 10 July 2009, an article on the massacre by Pulitzer Prize-winning journalist James Risen appeared in The New York Times. Risen stated that human rights groups' estimates of the total number of victims "ranged from several hundred to several thousand" and that US officials had "repeatedly discouraged efforts to investigate the episode". Questioned about the article by Anderson Cooper of CNN during a trip to Africa, United States President Barack Obama said he had asked national security officials to investigate allegations that the Bush administration had resisted efforts to have the matter investigated.

Excerpts from Afghan Massacre: The Convoy of Death were broadcast again and discussed on the Democracy Now! radio programme on 13 July 2009, with images from the documentary shown on the programme's website. The programme, which featured James Risen and Susannah Sirkin, deputy director of Physicians for Human Rights, claimed that "at least 2,000" prisoners of war had perished in the massacre. Sirkin confirmed the claims made in Afghan Massacre: The Convoy of Death that eyewitnesses who had given information on the incident had been tortured and killed, and stated that a FOIA document showed that the "U.S. government and, apparently, intelligence agency – it's a three-letter word that's redacted of an intelligence branch of the U.S. government in the FOIA – they knew and reported that eyewitnesses to this massacre had been killed and tortured."

Risen commented in the programme that in writing his article he "tried not to get caught up in something that I think in the past has slowed down some of the efforts by journalists to look into this. I think in the past one of the mistakes some journalists made was to try and prove a direct involvement by the U.S. personnel in the massacre itself. I frankly don't believe that any U.S. military personnel were involved in the massacre. And, you know, U.S. Special Forces troops who were traveling with Dostum have long maintained that they knew nothing about this. And, you know, so I tried not to go down that road." He added that "the investigation should focus rather on what happened afterwards in the Bush administration."

On 17 July 2009, in an article published by Radio Free Europe/Radio Liberty, Dostum again described Doran's film as a "fake story", saying that the whole number of prisoners of war captured by his troops was less than the number Doran's film claimed had been killed, and denying there could have been any abuse of prisoners. Dostum's column was sharply criticised by human rights groups. In a rebuttal published by Radio Free Europe/Radio Liberty in parallel to Dostum's piece, Sam Zarifi, the Asia-Pacific director for Amnesty International and a human rights investigator in Afghanistan in 2002, stated that "investigations carried out shortly after the alleged killings by highly experienced and respected forensic analysts from Physicians for Human Rights established the presence of recently deceased human remains at Dasht-e Leili and suggested that they were the victims of homicide."

=== Awards ===
Afghan Massacre: the Convoy of Death won a Gold Special Jury Award at the Worldfest Houston Film Festival 2004. The footage of Mazar-i-Sharif featured in the documentary is by Najibullah Quraishi, who won two prizes at the 2002 Rory Peck Awards for this work, the Sony International Impact Award and the Rory Peck Award for Hard News.
