= Awhad al-Din Kermani =

Persian poet and Ṣūfī mystic

Awḥad al-Dīn Ḥāmid ibn Abi ʾl-Fakhr Kirmānī (Note: Also Awḥad-al-Dīn Kermānī or Shaikh Abu Hamid Auhadeddin Kermani.) (Persian: اوحدالدین حامد بن ابی الفخر; died 21 March 1238) was a Persian poet and Ṣūfī mystic.

Kirmānī studied under Rukn al-Dīn al-Sijāsī and joined the ṭarāʾiq (orders) of Quṭb al-Dīn al-Abharī and Abū Najīb al-Suhrawardī. He traveled from Kirmān through Azerbaijan, Iraq and Syria and met many leading mystics and philosophers of the day, including Shams al-Dīn Tabrīzī, Jalāl al-Dīn Rūmī, ʿUthmān Rūmī, Saḍr al-Dīn al-Qūnawī and Fakhr al-Dīn al-ʿIrāqī. In Damascus, he met Ibn ʿArabī, who exercised a great influence on his ideas. He ended his life a teacher in Baghdad, where he was rewarded by the caliph al-Mustanṣir in 1234/1235. He probably died on 21 March 1238.

Kirmānī's writings belong to the tradition of Shāhidbāzī, seeing divine beauty in earthly things. He was criticized for the homoerotic nature of some of his writings.
