= The Dancing Boys of Afghanistan =

2010 documentary film directed by Najibullah Quraishi

- Directed by: Najibullah Quraishi
- Written by: Jamie Doran
- Produced by: Jamie Doran
- Cinematography: Mike Healy
- Release date: March 29, 2010
- Running time: 52 minutes
- Language: English

The Dancing Boys of Afghanistan is a 2010 documentary film produced by Clover Films and directed by Afghan journalist Najibullah Quraishi about the practice of bacha bazi in Afghanistan. The 52-minute documentary premiered in the UK at the Royal Society of Arts on March 29, 2010, and aired on PBS Frontline in the United States on April 20.

Bacha bazi (from the Persian bacheh بچه‌, literally "Child Play") is a form of sexual slavery and child prostitution in which prepubescent and adolescent boys are sold to wealthy or powerful men for entertainment and sexual activities. This business thrives in Afghanistan, where many men keep dancing boys as status symbols.

The practice is illegal under Afghan law. It was banned under the Taliban's 1996-2001 rule, but has seen a resurgence after the American invasion of Afghanistan.
