= Bacha bazi =

Form of child sexual abuse in Central Asia

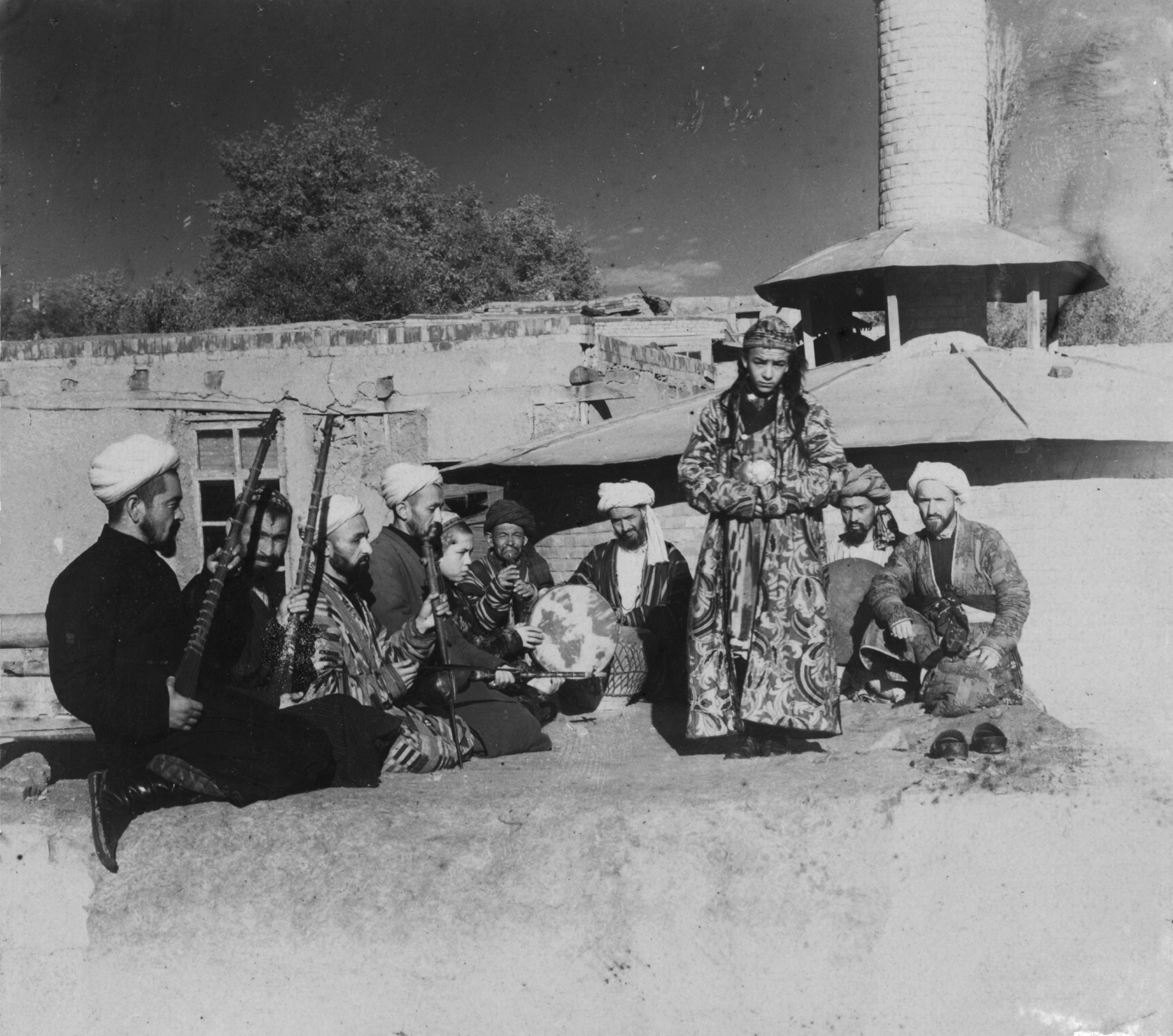
Bacha dance performance in the city of Samarkand (in modern-day Uzbekistan), c. 1910

Bacha bazi (Persian (Note: Persian pronunciation: [ba.t͡ʃʰæ bäː.zíː]): بچه بازی, lit. 'boy play') is a pederastic practice in Afghanistan and in historical Turkestan, in which men exploit and enslave adolescent boys, sometimes for sexual abuse, and/or coerce them to cross-dress in attire traditionally only worn by women and girls and dance for entertainment. The man exploiting the young boy is called a bacha baz (literally "boy player") and the young boy is called a bacha.

Often, the boys come from an impoverished and vulnerable situation such as street children, mainly without relatives or abducted from their families. In some cases, families facing extreme poverty or starvation may feel compelled to sell their young sons to a bacha baz or allow them to be "adopted" in exchange for food or money. The bachas are obliged to serve their patrons and their wishes, through cross-dressing and sexual entertainment. Bachas are primarily exploited for entertainment, but they have also been used for daily tasks in war, and for becoming bodyguards. (Note: According to a 2014 report on bachah-bāzi by Afghanistan Independent Human Rights Commission (AIHRC), the leading Afghan human rights organization, the practice remains "normal and customary" in some areas of Afghanistan, and bachahs play (or are forced to play) the roles of "bodyguards, apprentices, and servants at home, shop, bakery, workshop, hotels, restaurants and other paid jobs" (Saramad et al., "Bachabazi," 3; the report’s introduction by Sima Samar, the then-head of the AIHRC).) Facing social stigma and sexual abuse, the young boys, who often despise their captors, struggle with psychological effects from the abuse and suffer from emotional trauma for life, including turning to drugs and alcohol.

Bacha bazi was outlawed during the Islamic Republic of Afghanistan period. Nevertheless, it was widely practiced. Force and coercion were common, and security officials of the Islamic Republic of Afghanistan stated they were unable to end such practices and that many of the men involved in bacha bazi were powerful and well-armed warlords. The laws were seldom enforced against powerful offenders, and police had reportedly been complicit in related crimes. While bacha bazi carried the death penalty, the boys were sometimes charged rather than the perpetrators.

The practice carries the death penalty under Taliban law. Despite the official ban, the practice continues, although some scholars argue that since the mid-2010s, the practice has gradually begun to recede from the view of the public and is increasingly subject to condemnation in places like Kabul.

== Etymology ==
Bacha bazi comes from the Persian words bache (بچه), meaning 'child' or 'young boy', and bāzi (بازی), meaning 'game' or 'play', which later evolved into an Uzbekified form of the word into Bacha bozi (Бача бози), which was known by the same term by the Russians.

== History ==
=== Origins of Bacha bazi ===
Scholar and Turkologist Ingeborg Baldauf (1988) hypothesises that bacha bazi originated from Hellenistic Greco-Bactrian influences developed in the regions of Bactria and Sogdia, noting the similarities in classical Greek pederastic customs and the distinction between erastes (lover) and eromenos (beloved). Another potential origin being from Ancient China, due to the parallels of Chinese and Central Asian 'boy love', and its existence in East Turkestan. The Journal of Trafficking and Human Exploitation (2019) said that bacha bazi is considered by some anthropologists to have been introduced by Alexander the Great's ancient Macedonian army in Central Asia. Further stating "[o]ld poems, tales, and songs about Bacha Bazi in Afghanistan predate the pre-Islamic era (Eighth Century)." The Journal of Contemporary Asian Studies (2018) said, "[i]t is generally believed that bachabazi existed in antiquity", but added it was unclear if it was connected with ancient Occidental pederasty due to insufficient study to "offer a conclusive picture" in the context of antiquity.

=== Bacha bazi in Turkestan ===
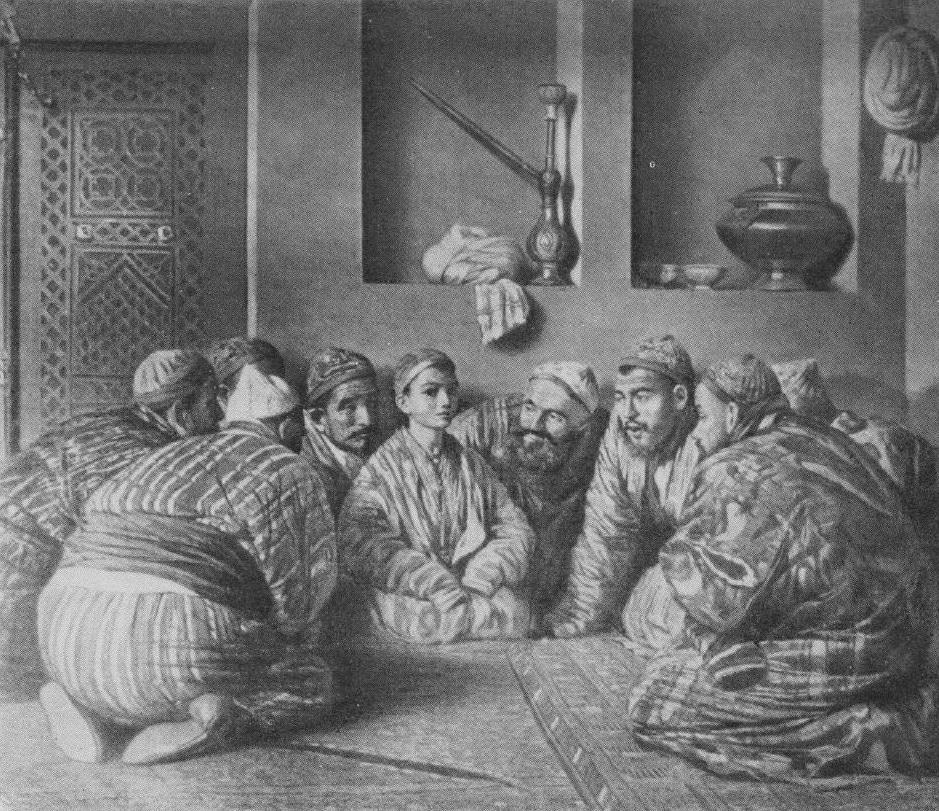
Depiction of a bacha and adult admirers in Russian Turkestan, c. 1868

According to Baldauf, the practice of bacha bazi in Medieval Central Asia was recognized by the 13th century, having spread from Khorasan. After the Russians conquered most of Central Asia, they encountered the practice of 'bacha bozi' (Note: The term was known to be 'bacha bozi' by the Russians, derived from an Uzbekified pronunciation of the Persian word 'bacha bāzi'), a practice of boys dancing dressed as girls during the 19th century in the Emirate of Bukhara, and surrounding regions in the north, most common among ethnic Uzbeks, and ethnic Turkmens. The Russians left many detailed accounts of this practice, as they found these cross-dressing and sexual habits to be bizarre, as well as its social and sexual effect on society.

This practice was not only about young boys cross-dressing in female attire, but they would often perform sexual services for their admirers. Abdulla Qodiriy, the first modern Uzbek novelist, was not the only one among Uzbek intellectuals in describing same-sex relations among madrasa students. Qodiriy has also witnessed many incidents taking places in madrasas, and had left a semi-biographical account of a tragic story about two madrasa students in amorous relations, which would later be adapted as a play by Mark Weil and staged at Ilkhom Theatre, the first independent theatre in the Soviet Union, and the only self-supporting cultural institution in the Uzbek SSR.

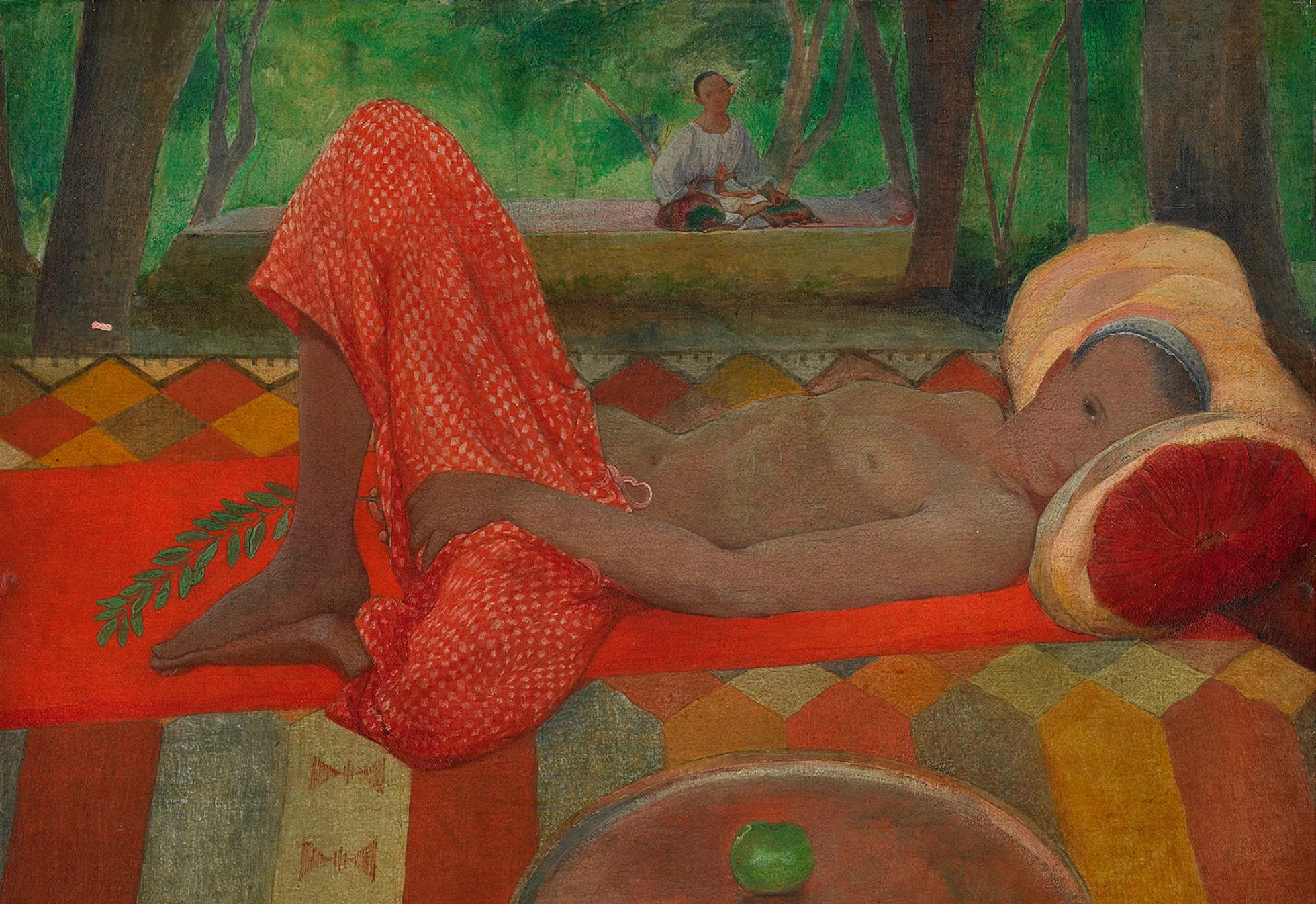
1923 painting of a bacha in the city of Samarkand (in modern-day Uzbekistan)

Besides the Russians, a number of Western travellers through Central Asia, have reported on the phenomenon of bacha bazi, while visiting the region of Turkestan. In 1872 to 1873, Eugene Schuyler observed that the boys of the Emirate of Bukhara were trained to replace the dancing girls of other countries. His opinion was that the dances "were by no means indecent, though they were often very lascivious". Schuyler also reported that these bachas continued to flourish until 1872 in Tashkent, when a severe epidemic of cholera influenced the Mullahs to declare that dancing was against the words of Allah, and at the request of the leaders of the native population, the Russian authorities forbade public dances during that summer.

However, Schuyler had also remarked that the ban had barely lasted a year, and how enthusiastic the Sarts were for a bazem "dance". Schuyler also reported that a rich patron would often help establish a favourite dancer in business after he had grown too old to carry on his profession.

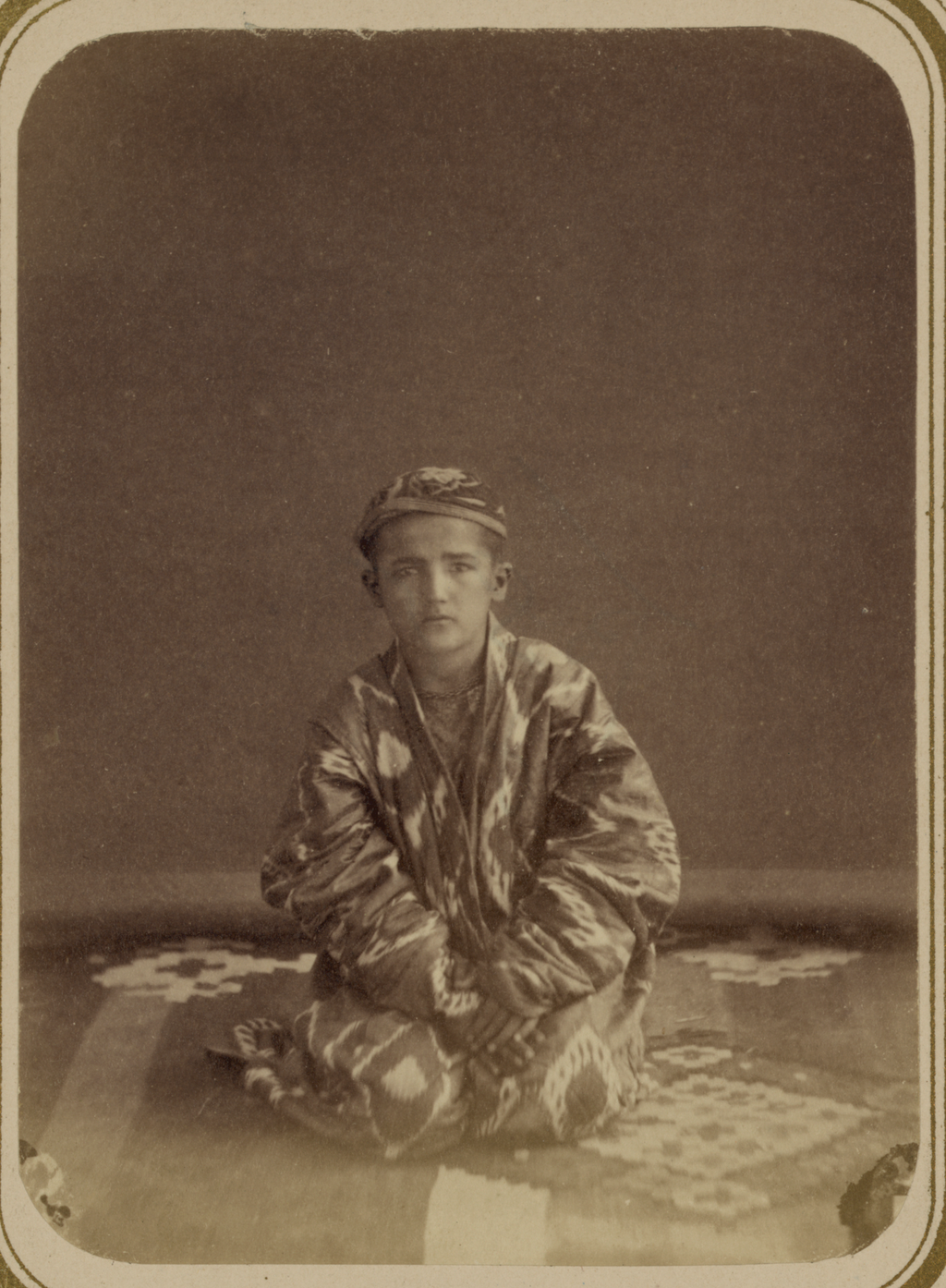
Bacha in Turkestan, c. 1870

Count Konstantin Konstantinovich Pahlen, during his travels through the area in 1908 and 1909, described such dances, and commissioned photographs of the dancers:

Cushions and rugs were fetched, on which we gratefully reclined, great carpets were spread over the court, the natives puffed at their narghiles, politely offering them to us, and the famous Khivan bachehs made their entrance. Backstage, an orchestra mainly composed of twin flutes, kettle drums, and half a dozen man-sized silver trumpets took up its stand. Opposite us a door left slightly ajar led to the harem quarters. We caught a glimpse of flashing eyes as the inmates thronged to the door to have a good look at us and watch the performance. The orchestra started up with a curious, plaintive melody, the rhythm being taken up and stressed by the kettle drums, and four bachehs took up their positions on the carpet. The bachehs are young men specially trained to perform a particular set of dances. Barefoot, and dressed like women in long, brightly coloured silk smocks reaching below their knees and narrow trousers fastened tightly round their ankles, their arms and hands sparkle with rings and bracelets. They wear their hair long, reaching below the shoulders, though the front part of the head is clean shaven. The nails of the hands and feet are painted red, the eyebrows are jet black and meet over the bridge of the nose. The dances consist of sensuous contortions of the body and a rhythmical pacing to and fro, with the hands and arms raised in a trembling movement. As the ballet proceeded the number of dancers increased, the circle grew in size, the music waxed shriller and shriller and the eyes of the native onlookers shone with admiration, while the bachehs intoned a piercing melody in time with the ever-growing tempo of the music. The Heir explained that they were chanting of love and the beauty of women. Swifter and swifter moved the dancers till they finally sank to the floor, seemingly exhausted and enchanted by love. They were followed by others, but the general theme was usually the same.

In 1909, two bachas performed among the entertainers at the Central Asian Agricultural, Industrial and Scientific Exposition in Tashkent. Noting the public's constant interest in, and laughter at the performance, several locally based researchers recorded the lyrics of the songs performed by the two boys (16-year-old Hadji-bacha and 10-year-old Sayid-bacha, both from the then-Margilan Uezd). The songs were then published in the original "Sart language", with a Russian translation. It waned in many major cities after World War I, for reasons that dance historian Anthony Shay describes as "Victorian era prudery and [the] severe disapproval of colonial powers such as the Russians, British, and French, and the post-colonial elites who had absorbed those Western colonial values". Bacha bazi never disappeared completely within the Central Asian republics, and had shifted to become an underground activity, being practiced in secret.

=== Spread into Afghanistan ===
Lord Curzon, who visited the court of Abdur Rahman Khan in the late 19th century, refers to "dancing-boys" as "an amusement much favored in Afghanistan", and John Alfred Gray, a British physician who served as the Amir's surgeon in the early 1890s, describes a scene of a dozen boys, "aged about thirteen to fourteen," with long hair and in girls' dress, dancing at the court. Mahmud Tarzi, a leading intellectual of the time, also makes reference to the presence of both bāzengar (dancing-boys) and kanchini (dancing-girls) in public gatherings of late 19th century Kabul in his memoir.

During the time of Abdur Rahman Khan, the signification of bacha bazi was mainly about having bachas dance, and to be bodyguards, rather than having sexual liaisons. These were mainly called gholām-bacha (meaning 'servant child'), and would grow up to be commanders-in-chief, treasury lords, and the Amir's personal bodyguards.

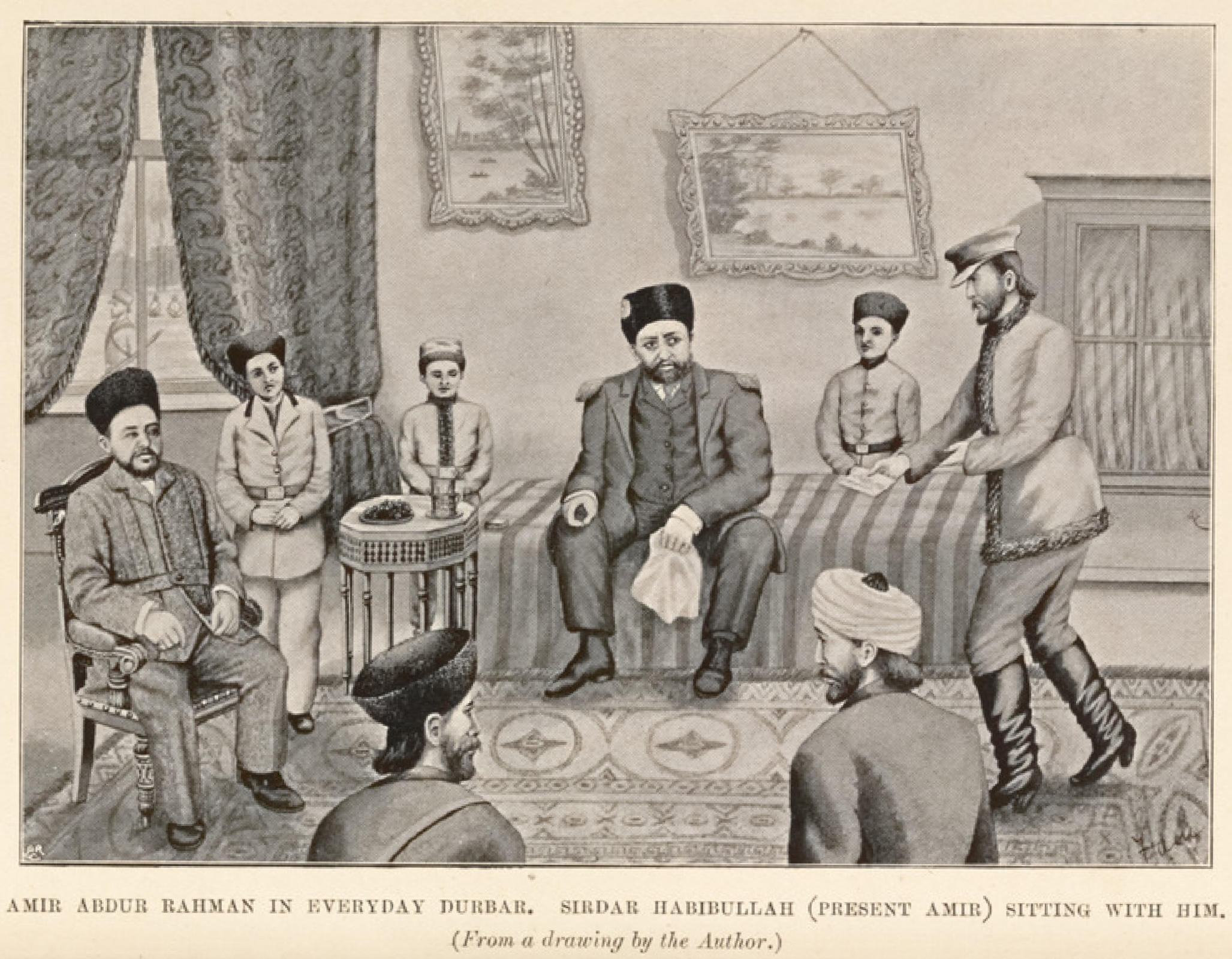
Abdur Rahman Khan, the Emir of Afghanistan, surrounded by three of his gholam-bachās in the Royal Court c. 1900

=== Afghan penalization of Bacha bazi ===
His grandson, King Amanullah Khan had abolished the short-lived practice that was brought to the Afghan royal court in the 1880s and which later spread to neighboring societies, of recruiting or raising gholām-bachas, for moral reasons. Amanullah also wished to further boast his modernization and anti-slavery campaigns through such efforts, and had criminalized this custom by law.

Article 170 of the first General Penal Code of Afghanistan, which was adopted in 1921, called for a fine of 1,000–5,000 rupees, and jail time for keeping bachas. This was the first law on bacha bazi in the history of modern Afghanistan, and according to Article 167 of the same Penal Code, perpetrators of the 'despicable act' (feʿl-e shaniʿ) on bachas, such as sodomy, were punishable by death. (Note: Article 135 of the Ministry of Justice's Nezāmnāmah (1924))

Furthermore, in the General Penal Code of 1924, which returned the power of deciding punishment to the clerics, the following clause was added: "The amrād would be sentenced to the same punishment [that the judge decides for the older man] should he have participated [in the sexual encounter] willingly."

Ethnomusicologist John Baily commented that organizing gatherings with dancing bachas was not allowed in Herat in the late 1970s, mainly because violent fights often erupted at such events. German ethnographic research, conducted in the 1970s, observed the widespread practice of dancing boys or bachabozlik among Uzbek populations in northern Afghanistan. The research found such stances were prevalent among Afghan intellectuals, who either "denied the existence of the phenomenon in Afghanistan or among their own ethnic group" or associated it with illiteracy, gender segregation, and the limited sexual possibilities of rural areas. While the exchange of a few kisses and caresses was permissible between the bacha and bacha bāz, no sexual intercourse was allowed, or the relationship would end abruptly.

According to international relations scholar Lasha Tchantouridze, there is no reliable data about bacha bazi during the socialist era or the way the Soviets handled it during their military operation. Tchantouridze suggests that—since the Soviets executed perpetrators of similar practices in Central Asia during the 1920s and 1930s—they probably did not tolerate the practice in Afghanistan either. However, bacha bazi was practiced by the Mujahideen due to lawlessness and power, and later by field commanders in the Northern Alliance. Among the Mujahideen, the keeping of underage male conscripts (so-called "chai boys") for sexual servitude was seen as a status symbol.

== Formation of the Taliban ==
According to some accounts, the practice of bacha bazi by warlords was one of the key factors in Mullah Omar mobilizing the Taliban, as he became sickened by the abusive raping of children by warlords and turned against their authority from 1994 onwards.

After President Mohammad Najibullah stepped down, the country fell into chaos as various Mujahideen factions fought for total control of Afghanistan. Omar, while initially remaining quiet and focused on continuing his studies during the Afghan Civil War, became increasingly discontent with what he perceived as fasād in the country, including the practice of bacha bazi, ultimately prompting him to return to fighting in the Civil War.

Omar had a dream in 1994, in which a woman told him: "We need your help; you must rise. You must end the chaos. God will help you." Omar started his movement with less than 50 armed madrasa students who were simply known as the Tālibān (Pashto for 'students'). His recruits came from madrasas located in Afghanistan (mainly from Kandahar), and the Afghan refugee camps which were located across the border in Pakistan. They fought against the rampant corruption which had emerged during the civil war period, and were initially welcomed by Afghans who were weary of warlord rule.

In 1994, Omar, along with religious students in Kandahar, formed the Taliban, which emerged victorious against other Afghan factions by 1996. Omar led the Taliban to form a Sunni Islamic theocracy headed by the Supreme Council, known as the Islamic Emirate of Afghanistan, which strictly enforced sharia.

Reportedly, in early 1994, Omar led 30 men armed with 16 rifles to free two young girls who had been kidnapped and raped by a warlord, hanging him from a tank gun barrel. Another instance arose when in 1994, a few months before the Taliban took control of Kandahar, two militia commanders confronted each other over a young boy whom they both wanted to sodomize. In the ensuing fight, Omar's group freed the boy; appeals soon flooded in for Omar to intercede in other disputes. His movement gained momentum through the year, and he quickly gathered recruits from Islamic schools totaling 12,000 by the year's end with some Pakistani volunteers, who were mainly Pashtun madrasa students from tribal areas.

Bacha bazi was officially outlawed by the Taliban after their ascent to power and imposition of Sharia law in 1996. The Taliban virtually eradicated the practice by harsh repression against those who engaged in it, as it carried the death penalty.

== Revival following 2001 U.S. invasion ==
This practice saw an increase after the Taliban's ouster in 2001, due both to the former Mujahideen commanders regaining power and the widespread lawlessness. Today, Afghanistan is one of the few places in the world where the aesthetic-erotic category of bacha (beardless young male) has been preserved in the public consciousness.

In 2011, in an agreement between the United Nations and Afghanistan, Radhika Coomaraswamy and Afghan officials signed an action plan promising to end the practice, along with enforcing other protections for children. In 2014, Suraya Subhrang, child rights commissioner at the national Afghanistan Independent Human Rights Commission, stated that the areas practicing bacha bazi had increased. Up to 2017, Afghan law lacked clear definitions or provisions to address the practice. A new penal code entered in force in February 2018, containing specific provisions to punish offenders involved in bacha bazi.

In December 2012, a teenage victim of sexual exploitation and abuse by a commander of the Afghan Border Police killed eight guards. He made a drugged meal for the guards and then, with the help of two friends, attacked them, after which they fled to neighbouring Pakistan.

A study published in 2014 by the Afghanistan Independent Human Rights Commission (AIHRC) found that 78% of the men who practice bacha bazi are married to a woman. Some Afghans assert that bacha bazi violates Islamic law on grounds that it is homosexual in nature; others claim that Islam only forbids a man to sexually engage with another man, but not with a boy.

On 23 September 2016, Taliban militants in northern Baghlan province executed a man and a young boy on charges of "bacha bazi" (pederasty). The man was caught with the boy at his house by the militants and both were shot dead by the militants in front of family members.

=== U.S. military encounters with the practice ===
In December 2010, a leaked diplomatic cable revealed that foreign contractors hired by the American military contractor DynCorp had spent money on bacha bazi in northern Afghanistan through hiring 'dancing boys' from the ages of 8 to 15, where a scandal happened involving foreign contractors employed to train Afghan policemen who took drugs and paid for young "dancing boys" to entertain them in northern Afghanistan. Afghan Interior Minister Mohammad Hanif Atmar requested that the U.S. military assume control over DynCorp training centres in response, but the U.S. embassy claimed that this was not "legally possible under the DynCorp contract".

The Washington Post reported it to be an incident of "questionable management oversight" in which foreign DynCorp workers "hired a teenage boy to perform a tribal dance at a company farewell party". Both incidents helped fuel Afghan government demands "to hold a tighter rein over private security companies", a demand that also led Atmar to offer that the overstretched police should take over protection for military convoys in the south of Afghanistan, to which Karzai issued a decree calling for the dissolution of all private security companies by the end of the year, an edict that has since been slightly watered down.

Some U.S. troops were told that "nothing could be done", effectively discouraging intervention, even on U.S.-run bases, while also illustrating how this practice was deeply embedded in local security structures overseen or supported by U.S.-backed training programs, due to the lack of prosecutorial follow-through, even when local officials were arrested. The rationalization and hierarchy of power often discouraged U.S. response to such incidents during 2010–2016.

In 2015, the New York Times, had reported that U.S. soldiers were instructed to ignore the sexual abuse of boys by Afghan allies, to maintain good relations with them, and how for a decade, the U.S. army were not properly trained in how to report allegations of child sexual abuse by American allies.

The practice of bacha bazi prompted the United States Department of Defense to hire social scientist AnnaMaria Cardinalli to investigate the problem, as ISAF soldiers on patrol often passed older men walking hand-in-hand with young boys. Coalition soldiers often found that young Afghan men were trying to "touch and fondle them", which the soldiers did not understand.

In 2011, an Afghan mother in Kunduz Province reported that her 12-year-old son had been chained to a bed and raped for two weeks by an Afghan Local Police (ALP) commander named Abdul Rahman. When confronted, Rahman laughed and confessed. He was subsequently severely beaten by two U.S. Special Forces soldiers and thrown off the base. The soldiers were involuntarily separated from the military, but later reinstated after a lengthy legal case. As a direct result of this incident, legislation was created called the "Mandating America's Responsibility to Limit Abuse, Negligence and Depravity", or "Martland Act" named after Special Forces Sgt. 1st Class Charles Martland.

In 2015, The New York Times reported that U.S. soldiers serving in Afghanistan were instructed by their commanders to ignore child sexual abuse being carried out by Afghan security forces, except "when rape is being used as a weapon of war". American soldiers have been instructed not to intervene—in some cases, not even when their Afghan allies have abused boys on military bases, according to interviews and court records. But the U.S. soldiers have been increasingly troubled that instead of weeding out pedophiles, the U.S. military was arming them against the Taliban and placing them as the police commanders of villages—and doing little when they began abusing children. Military lawyer Annie Barry Bruton commented that "both the Pentagon and the White House declined to take responsibility for inaction on the part of the U.S. government and instead shifted the blame to the Afghan government".

According to a report published in June 2017 by the Special Inspector General for Afghanistan Reconstruction, the DOD had received 5,753 vetting requests of Afghan security forces, some of which related to sexual abuse. The DOD was investigating 75 reports of gross human rights violations, including 7 involving child sexual assault. According to The New York Times, discussing that report, American law required military aid to be cut off to the offending unit, but that never happened. US Special Forces officer, Capt. Dan Quinn, was relieved of his command in Afghanistan after fighting an Afghan militia commander who had been responsible for keeping a boy as a sex slave.

=== Post-war ===
In 2022, after the Taliban's return to power following the United States' military disengagement from Afghanistan, it was reported that the abuse persisted in the reinstated Islamic Emirate, with Taliban officials accused of engaging in bacha bazi and criminalization of victims. According to a 2022 Global Initiative Against Transnational Organized Crime report, the practice is expected to continue and potentially be amplified. In addition to some Taliban commanders allegedly holding bachas, the Taliban's ban on music and dancing appears to have driven the practice further underground, making it even harder to identify or protect victims.

== In popular culture ==
Bacha bazi within 21st century Afghanistan is a prominent theme of the 2003 The New York Times best selling novel The Kite Runner by Khaled Hosseini. In the novel, the main character Amir witnesses his best friend, a Hazara boy named Hassan, be sexually assaulted by a fellow teenager named Assef. 15 years later, long after Amir fled Afghanistan due to the Soviet–Afghan War, he learns that Hassan was killed by the Taliban and that Hassan's son, Sohrab, was left an orphan. Amir journeys to Afghanistan to adopt him, but discovers that Sohrab was sold as a bacha by the corrupt manager of the orphanage to Assef, the same man who had sexually assaulted Sohrab's father Hassan decades earlier. One scholar wrote that the novel "offers commentary on the role that racism and ethnic rivalry play in upholding the existence of bacha bazi", as well as the long-lasting, generational psychological trauma associated with being a bacha.

In 2007, an American drama film of the same name based on Hosseini's novel, directed by Marc Forster from a screenplay by David Benioff, was released. Shortly afterward, the film was banned in Afghanistan due to fears of intertribal reprisals against Pashtuns, given the film's depiction of Pashtun man enslaving a Hazara youth as his bacha.

Clover Films and Afghan journalist Najibullah Quraishi made a documentary film titled The Dancing Boys of Afghanistan about the practice, which was shown in the UK in March 2010 and aired in the US the following month. Journalist Nicholas Graham of The Huffington Post lauded the documentary as "both fascinating and horrifying". The film won the 2011 Documentary award in the Amnesty International UK Media Awards.

The musical The Boy Who Danced on Air by Rosser & Sohne premiered off-off-Broadway in 2017. Inspired by the documentary The Dancing Boys of Afghanistan, the story centers on Paiman, a bacha who is nearing the end of his servitude. As he prepares for his release, he meets Feda, another bacha, and the two begin to fall in love. Together, they contemplate escaping their circumstances. Meanwhile, their masters, Jahander and Zemar, grapple with the growing influence of American culture on Afghan society.

The production received positive to mixed reviews. Jesse Green, writing for The New York Times, said the work "[took] the challenge of difficult source material too far... The ick factor here is dangerously high, a problem that the production... labors hard to mitigate through aesthetics," and appreciated the romance but wished it had not attempted "a stab at political relevance." Jonathan Mandell, writing for New York Theater, said that the Jahander subplot was "one of the ways [Rosser and Sohne] are trying to compensate for their Western perspective and the show's focus on the fictional romance. But their efforts at filling in the background don't strike me as sufficient." TheaterMania's review called it "both emotionally and intellectually stirring. Anyone who cares about the future of the American musical should run out and see it now—as should anyone who cares about the country in which the United States is presently fighting the longest war in our history."

After an online stream of the original production was released in July 2020, the work received significant backlash from Afghans, particularly LGBT Afghans, many of whom perceived it as romanticizing child sexual abuse and criticized the American writers for misrepresenting bacha bazi as a widely accepted tradition in Afghanistan. The backlash led many to apologize for their involvement with the production and stream; the stream was removed ahead of schedule. After consulting with members of the Afghan community, creators Tim Rosser and Charlie Sohne acknowledged in a statement that "no Afghan voices were empowered in the creation of the show," and chose to end all distribution of the music and donate previous proceeds to Afghan charities.

== See also ==
- Child sexual abuse
- Emirate of Bukhara
- Russian conquest of Central Asia
- Human rights in Afghanistan
- Bacha posh, cross-dressing a daughter as a boy for increased social freedom in Afghanistan
- The Dancing Boys of Afghanistan (2010 documentary)
- Khawal, cross-dressed male dancers in pre-20th century Egypt
- Köçek, cross-dressed male dancers in Ottoman Turkey
- Ubayd Zakani, a 14th-century Persian poet
- Nazar ila'l-murd
