= Jimmy Johnstone =

Scottish footballer (1944–2006)

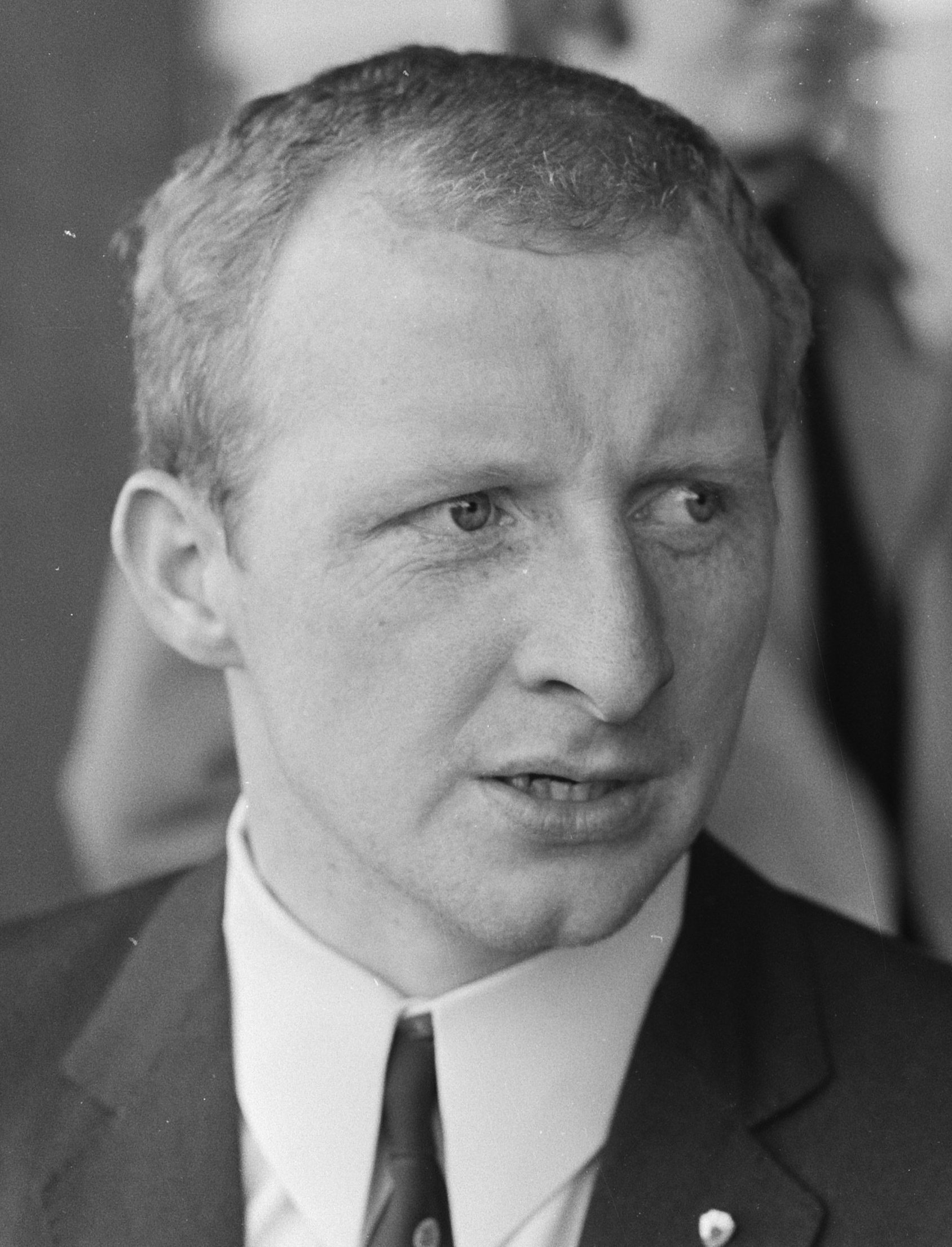
- Johnstone in Amsterdam (1971)

Personal information
- Full name: James Connolly Johnstone
- Date of birth: 30 September 1944
- Place of birth: Viewpark, Scotland
- Date of death: 13 March 2006 (aged 61)
- Place of death: Uddingston, Scotland
- Height: 5 ft 4 in (1.62 m)
- Position: Outside right

Youth career
- 1958–1959: Celtic
- 1959–1961: Viewpark Boys Guild
- 1961–1962: Celtic
- 1961–1962: → Blantyre Celtic (loan)

Senior career*
Years	Team	Apps	(Gls)
1962–1975	Celtic	306	(82)
1975	San Jose Earthquakes	10	(0)
1975–1977	Sheffield United	11	(2)
1977	Dundee	3	(0)
1977–1978	Shelbourne	9	(0)
1978–1979	Elgin City	18	(2)
Total		357	(86)

International career
1964	Scotland U23	2	(0)
1964–1974	Scotland	23	(4)
1964–1970	Scottish League XI	4	(0)
- * Club domestic league appearances and goals

James Connolly Johnstone (30 September 1944 – 13 March 2006) was a Scottish footballer who played as an outside right. Known as "Jinky" for his elusive dribbling style, Johnstone played for Celtic for 13 years and was one of the Lisbon Lions, the team that won the 1967 European Cup Final. Johnstone also won nine consecutive Scottish championships. He scored 129 goals for Celtic in 515 appearances and was voted the club's greatest-ever player by fans in 2002.

Johnstone also won 23 caps for Scotland. He finished third in voting for the 1967 Ballon d'Or and was inducted into the Scottish Football Hall of Fame when it was inaugurated in 2004.

Rodger Baillie of The Sunday Times called Johnstone a "genius who lived by magic and mischief", while Hugh McIlvanney wrote that no other player "besieged opponents with such a complex, concentrated swirl of deceptive manoeuvres or ever conveyed a more exhilarating sense of joy in working wonders with the ball."

== Early life and youth career ==
Johnstone was the youngest of five children born to Matthew and Sarah Johnstone. He grew up in the family home on Old Edinburgh Road in Viewpark, North Lanarkshire, and he was educated at St Columba's primary school in Viewpark and then at St John's secondary school in Uddingston.

His footballing ability first came to note at primary school, playing for the St Columba's team that won three trophies in 1953–54. The team at his secondary school, St John's, were less able, but their physical education teacher, Tommy Cassidy, was a friend of Sammy Wilson, who played for Celtic at the time and had scored in Celtic's 7–1 win over Rangers in the 1957 Scottish League Cup Final. Cassidy used his connections to get Johnstone a role as ball boy at Celtic.

At home, he used to dribble around milk bottles every day in the hallway for hours to perfect his skills. On reading that Stanley Matthews used to walk to Blackpool's ground wearing heavy boots to strengthen his leg muscles, Johnstone began wearing pit boots and would sprint and play football in them. He later said that this "probably added about three yards on to my pace."

Despite the thrill of being involved with Celtic as a ballboy, Johnstone wanted to play football. As a result, he left Celtic to play for his local Boys Guild team. As well as playing locally, the team travelled down to play Manchester United's boys' team. Johnstone's ability caught the eye of the English giants but, upon his return to Scotland, Celtic scout John Higgins persuaded him to sign for Celtic; He signed youth terms on the same day as left-back Tommy Gemmell, who lived a few miles away and would also have a long association with the club. In order to gain experience, Johnstone was farmed out to junior club Blantyre Celtic.

== Club career ==
=== Celtic ===
Johnstone made his first team debut for Celtic on 27 March 1963 in a 6–0 defeat away against Kilmarnock in the league. His next appearance came a month later, away against Hearts. He was again on the losing side (4–3), but scored his first senior goal. Despite the defeats, Johnstone's performances won him a place in the team for the Scottish Cup Final on 4 May 1963 against Rangers. The young winger turned in a fine performance, helping Celtic to a creditable 1–1 draw with his confident dribbling. He also scored a goal but it was disallowed due to a foul moments earlier by teammate John Hughes. Johnstone was dropped for the replay and Celtic were outclassed by Rangers, who ran out comfortable 3–0 winners.

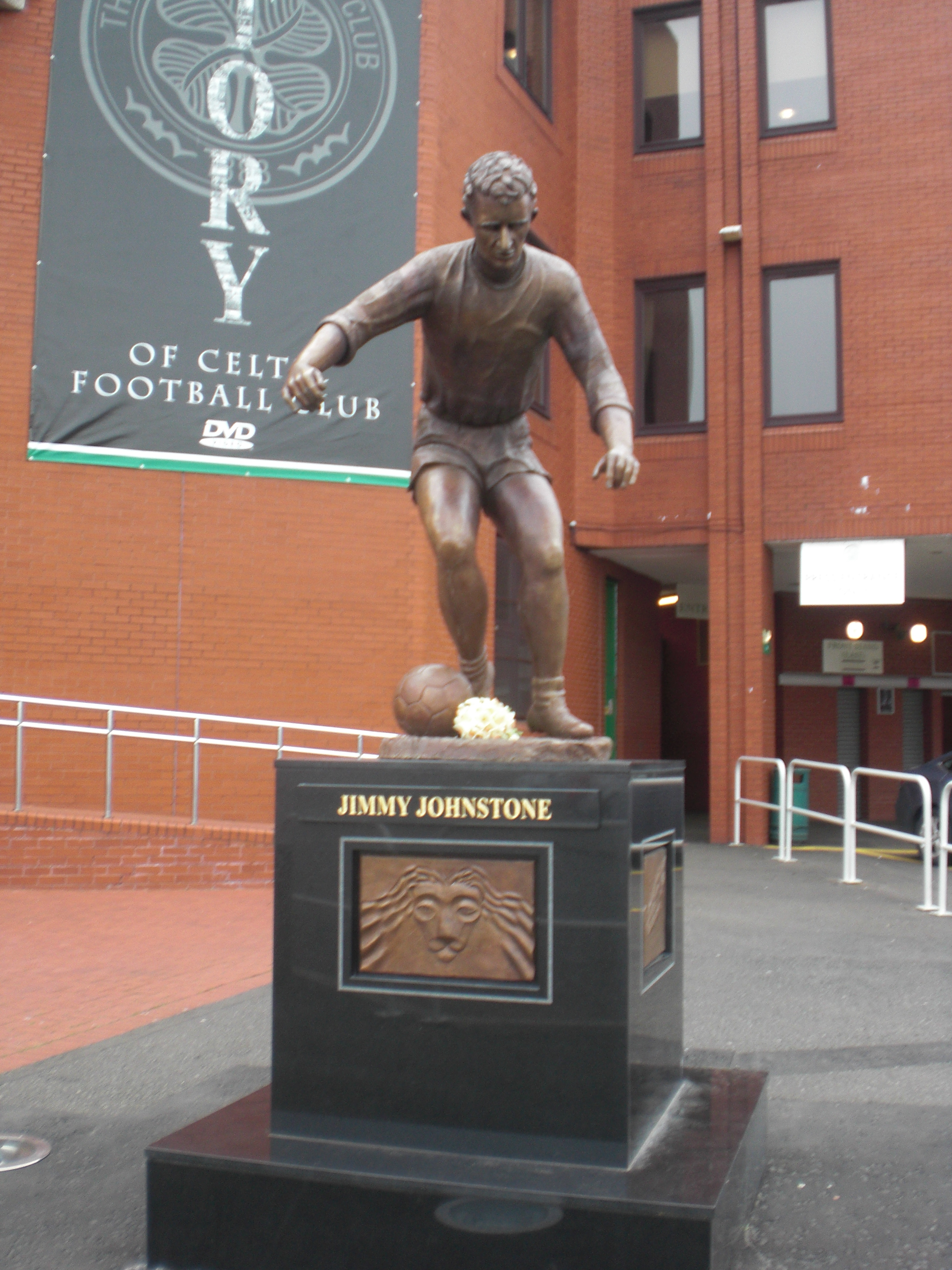
Statue of Johnstone at Celtic Park by Kate Robinson

The following season saw Johnstone establish himself as a regular in the side. He played in 25 league games, scoring six goals. He also helped Celtic reach the semi-finals of the European Cup Winners' Cup, scoring against FC Basel in a 5–0 win at Parkhead in the first round, and then against MTK Budapest in a 3–0 win in the first leg of the semi-final. Celtic, however, lost 4–0 in the return match in Hungary and were knocked out on aggregate.

Celtic were struggling throughout the 1960s until Jock Stein arrived at the club in 1965. By this time Johnstone was struggling to hold down a regular spot in the first team. On arrival at Celtic, Stein had doubts about Johnstone, considering him too much of an individual player, to the overall detriment of the team, and he left him out of the team for the 1965 Scottish Cup Final. Johnstone soon won Stein round with his skill, and won his first winner's medal on 23 October 1965 when he played in Celtic's 2–1 win over Rangers in the Scottish League Cup Final. His 32 league appearances and nine goals that season helped Celtic win their first league title in 12 years. Johnstone also helped Celtic reach their second European semi-final, scoring twice against Go Ahead Eagles en route, before losing 2–1 on aggregate to Liverpool in the Cup Winners' Cup.

Johnstone was one of the "Lisbon Lions", the team that won the then European Cup for Celtic in 1967. In an early round tie against Nantes, Johnstone's trickery on the wing saw him dubbed "the Flying Flea" by the French press, while his performances over that season saw him finish third in the European Footballer of the Year award.

Two weeks after their European Cup win, Celtic played Real Madrid on 7 June 1967 in a testimonial match for the now retired Alfredo Di Stefano. In front of over 100,000 fans at the Bernabéu Stadium, the sides engaged in a keenly fought contest that saw Bertie Auld and Real Madrid's Amancio sent off. Di Stefano played for the first 15 minutes, but it was Jimmy Johnstone who stole the show with an exhilarating performance that had even the Spanish supporters chanting "Olé!" throughout the game. Johnstone capped an outstanding performance by playing the pass to Bobby Lennox for the only goal in a 1–0 win for Celtic.

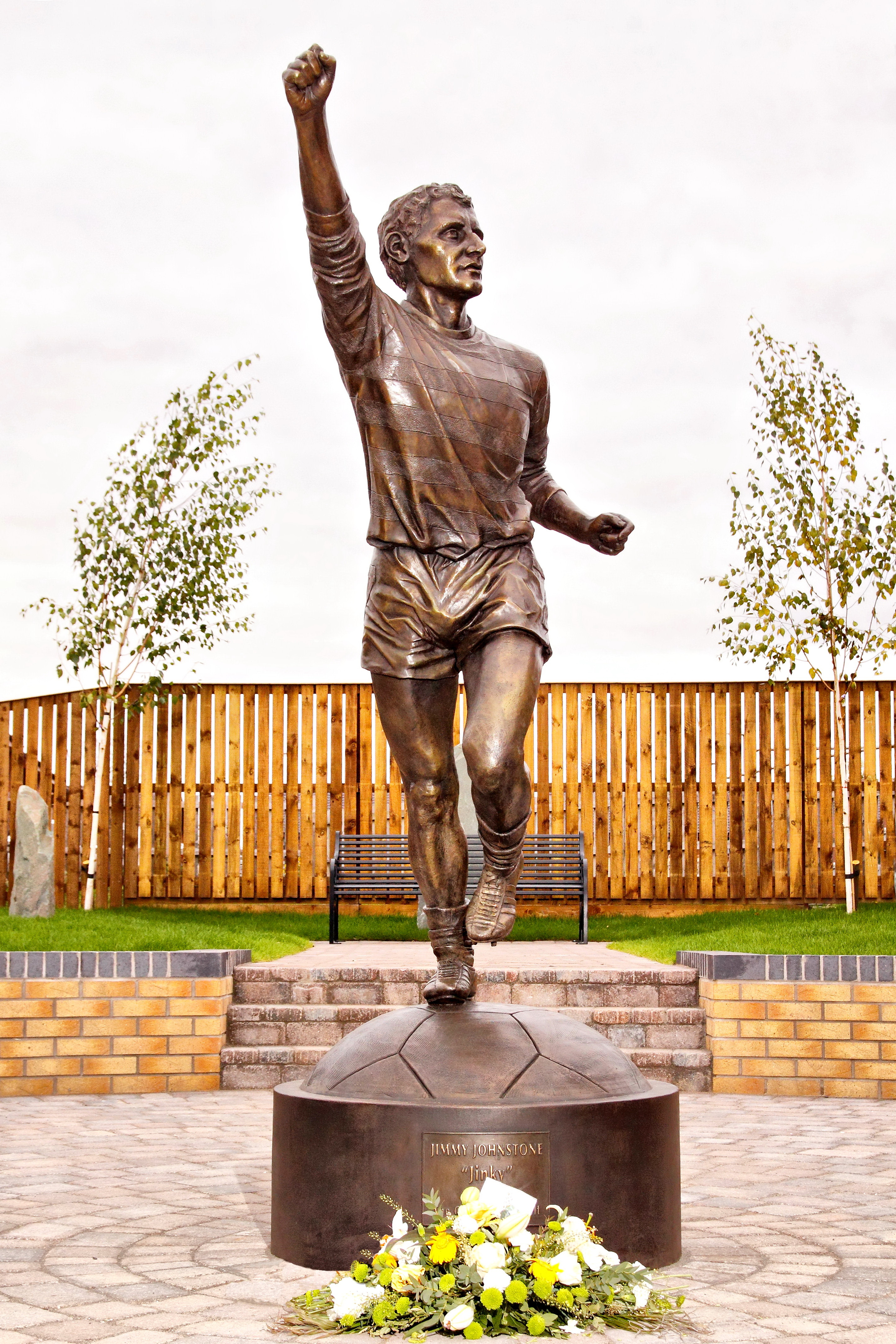
Johnstone's statue at Viewpark Memorial garden by John McKenna

Johnstone had a morbid fear of flying, which Jock Stein used to great effect on one occasion. Ahead of the first leg of a European tie against Red Star Belgrade at Parkhead in November 1968, Stein told Johnstone that, if Celtic won by four goals, he wouldn't have to travel to Yugoslavia for the second leg. Johnstone went on to produce an outstanding performance, scoring twice and providing assists for the other three goals in a 5–1 win. He helped Celtic reach a further European Cup Final in season 1969–70. His performance in the second leg of the semi-final against Leeds United at Hampden Park was particularly outstanding, and his mazy run in the second half set up Bobby Murdoch to score with a powerful shot for Celtic's winning goal in a 2–1 victory on the night. Leeds' defender Terry Cooper later quipped "I would love to have kicked Jinky, but I couldn't get near him!" Billy Bremner described Johnstone's performance as "one of the greatest exhibitions I have ever seen", adding that "Jimmy had one of these games where he was unstoppable." Celtic played Feyenoord in the final but, with Johnstone double-marked at all times, Celtic were unable to perform as they had in the 1967 final. Feyenoord dominated the match and defeated Celtic 2–1 after extra-time.

In all, he made 308 League appearances for Celtic, scoring 82 goals. He also played another 207 times for them in the Scottish Cup, League Cup and in Europe, for an overall total of 515 matches. He received further Ballon d'Or nominations in 1968 and 1969 placing 24th and 23rd, respectively.

=== Later career ===
In June 1975, Johnstone entered into negotiations with NASL club Rochester Lancers but ended up signing for the San Jose Earthquakes. He returned to the UK to play for Sheffield United, Dundee, Shelbourne and Elgin City. His manager at Dundee was former teammate Tommy Gemmell, but Johnstone later stated that his 'heart was not in it' and he did not apply himself properly during his short spell at Dens Park, having lost the motivation to play for other clubs after being released by Celtic.

== International career ==
Johnstone began his international career on 5 February 1964, playing for the Scottish Under 23 side in a friendly against England U23s, losing 2–0. He made one further appearance for the Scotland U23 side in May that year, a 3–0 win away against France U23.

He made his international debut for the full Scottish international side on 3 October 1964 in a British Home Championship match against Wales, in place of Rangers winger Willie Henderson. He was involved in the move that led to Scotland's second goal, though the match ended in a 3–2 win for the Welsh. Johnstone's next cap came that same month in a World Cup qualifier at Hampden Park against Finland. Scotland won 3–1, but Johnstone's performance was unimpressive, with his passing described as "lacking accuracy." Johnstone did not play for Scotland again until 2 April 1966, when he scored his first two international goals in a 4–3 defeat against England at Hampden Park. The first goal came with Scotland trailing 4–1, when he latched on to a pass from Denis Law and used his pace and power to run past the English defence and beat goalkeeper Gordon Banks from close range. He pulled back another goal for Scotland when he chased a floated ball towards goal from a Jim Baxter free kick and, from close range, scored with a powerful shot off the underside of the bar. Johnstone, along with Denis Law, was reported as one of Scotland's best performers, and his play resulted in England's Nobby Stiles being booked for a crushing tackle on him. Johnstone continued to play sporadically for Scotland, and he didn't score his next international goal until 22 October 1969 in a World Cup qualifier away against West Germany, Scotland losing 3–2.

In May 1974, during the build-up to the 1974 FIFA World Cup, and days before a British Home Championship match against England at Hampden, Johnstone and his other Scotland teammates took part in a drinking session at their hotel in Largs, Ayrshire. In the early hours, the group headed for shore, with Johnstone deciding to go out in a rowing boat. However, the boat had no rowlocks to take the oars and Johnstone found himself being taken out to sea by the tide. Stranded at sea, Johnstone had to be rescued by the Coastguard and the incident dominated headlines for days. Despite the embarrassing headlines, Johnstone went on to turn in an outstanding performance for Scotland against England, helping them to a 2–0 win. Johnstone was part of the Scotland squad that travelled to West Germany for the World Cup in the summer of 1974, but he didn't play in their three games.

Johnstone won 23 caps for Scotland.

== Style of play ==
Regarded as one of Scotland's greatest players, Johnstone was a diminutive winger known for his technique and dribbling skills, being able to go past players with ease, cut inside, score or contribute to goals.

== Later life ==
After his playing career ended, Johnstone's problems with alcohol worsened, despite the efforts of his family. When he approached Glasgow businessman and Celtic fan Willie Haughey in 1992 offering his medals for sale, Johnstone instead received support and guidance from Haughey in combatting his addictions, and the two men remained close friends thereafter.

A documentary film about Johnstone's life, created by Jamie Doran and narrated by Billy Connolly titled Lord of the Wing first aired on the BBC on 25 April 2004.

In June 2005, Carl Fabergé's great-granddaughter Sarah produced 19 jewelled eggs related to Johnstone.

== Death and legacy ==
Having been diagnosed with incurable motor neuron disease (MND) five years earlier, Johnstone died in March 2006, aged 61. The last person to call him was old Rangers rival Willie Henderson, who had become a firm friend of Johnstone. Thousands of Celtic fans and fans of many other clubs, including those of arch-rivals Rangers, paid tribute to his memory outside Celtic Park on Saint Patrick's Day, the day of his funeral service. Tributes were paid to Johnstone before the 2006 Scottish League Cup Final, played between Celtic and Dunfermline. There was a minute of applause before the game and the entire Celtic squad wore the number 7 on their shorts in his honour.

In 2008, a bronze statue by Kate Robinson of Johnstone in action was unveiled at the main entrance to Celtic Park.

In 2011, a statue of Johnstone and a memorial garden were created on the site at his former school, close to his home, on the Old Edinburgh Road, in Viewpark. The garden was opened by Johnstone's wife, family and some of the surviving members of the 'Lisbon Lions' team. The bronze, lifesize statue was made by sculptor John McKenna.

FIFA 100 All-time Dutch great Rob Rensenbrink recalled Johnstone first among world-class Scottish footballers.

== Career statistics ==
=== Club ===
Appearances and goals by club, season and competition
Club	Season	League			National cup		League cup		Continental		Other		Total	
Club	Season	Division	Apps	Goals	Apps	Goals	Apps	Goals	Apps	Goals	Apps	Goals	Apps	Goals
Celtic	1962–63	Scottish Division One	4	1	1	0	0	0	0	0	0	0	5	1
Celtic	1963–64	Scottish Division One	25	6	4	2	2	0	7 (Note: Appearance(s) in European Cup Winners' Cup)	2	4 (Note: Appearance(s) in Glasgow Cup)	0	42	10
Celtic	1964–65	Scottish Division One	24	1	1	0	10	3	4 (Note: Appearance(s) in Inter-Cities Fairs Cup)	0	1	0	40	4
Celtic	1965–66	Scottish Division One	32	9	7	1	8	1	7	3	—		54	14
Celtic	1966–67	Scottish Division One	25	13	5	0	10	1	9 (Note: Appearance(s) in European Cup)	2	2	0	51	16
Celtic	1967–68	Scottish Division One	29	5	1	0	8	5	2	0	5 (Note: Three appearances in Intercontinental Cup; two appearances one goal in Glasgow Cup)	1	45	11
Celtic	1968–69	Scottish Division One	31	5	6	2	8	0	5	2	0	0	50	9
Celtic	1969–70	Scottish Division One	27	10	4	1	6	0	9	0	0	0	46	11
Celtic	1970–71	Scottish Division One	30	8	8	2	9	5	4	4	1	0	52	19
Celtic	1971–72	Scottish Division One	23	9	2	0	8	1	6	0	1 (Note: Appearance(s) in Drybrough Cup)	0	40	10
Celtic	1972–73	Scottish Division One	22	7	7	2	7	1	3	0	2	3	41	13
Celtic	1973–74	Scottish Division One	15	3	2	1	9	1	6	3	0	0	32	8
Celtic	1974–75	Scottish Division One	19	5	0	0	7	3	2	0	3	1	31	9
Celtic	Total		306	82	48	11	92	21	64	16	19	5	529	135
San Jose Earthquakes	1975	North American Soccer League	9	0	—		—		—		—		9	0
Sheffield United	1975–76	English Division One	6	1	1	0	0	0	—		1 (Note: Appearance(s) in Sheffield & Hallamshire County Cup)	0	8	1
Sheffield United	1976–77	English Division Two	5	1	0	0	0	0	—		0	0	5	1
Sheffield United	Total		11	2	1	0	0	0	—		1	0	13	2
Dundee	1977–78	Scottish First Division	3	0	0	0	0	0	—		0	0	3	0
Total			329	84	49	11	92	21	64	16	20	5	554	137

=== International appearances ===
Scotland national team
Year	Apps	Goals
1964	2	0
1965	—	
1966	2	2
1967	2	0
1968	1	0
1969	2	1
1970	2	0
1971	4	0
1972	2	0
1973	—	
1974	6	1
Total	23	4

=== International goals ===
Scores and results list Scotland's goal tally first.

#	Date	Venue	Opponent	Score	Result	Competition
1	2 April 1966	Hampden Park, Glasgow	England	2–3	3–4	1965–66 British Home Championship
2	2 April 1966	Hampden Park, Glasgow	England	3–4	3–4	1965–66 British Home Championship
3	22 October 1969	Volksparkstadion, Hamburg	West Germany	1–0	2–3	1970 World Cup Qualifiers
4	1 June 1974	Klokke Stadion, Bruges	Belgium	1–1	1–2	Friendly match

== Honours ==
Celtic

- Scottish First Division (9): 1965–66, 1966–67, 1967–68, 1968–69, 1969–70, 1970–71, 1971–72, 1972–73, 1973–74
- Scottish Cup (4): 1966–67, 1970–71, 1971–72, 1973–74
- Scottish League Cup (5): 1965–66, 1966–67, 1968–69, 1969–70, 1974–75
- European Cup : 1967
  - Runner-up 1970

Scotland

- Home Championship (4): 1966–67, 1969–70, 1971–72, 1973–74

Individual

- Ballon d'Or (3rd place): 1967
- Rothman's Golden Boot Awards: 1970, 1972
