= Jimmy Johnstone: Lord of the Wing =

- Directed by: Jamie Doran
- Written by: Jamie Doran
- Narrated by: Billy Connolly
- Release date: 2004
- Country: United Kingdom

Jimmy Johnstone: Lord of the Wing is a 2004 documentary on the career of Jimmy 'Jinky' Johnstone, a Celtic FC and Scotland footballer in the 1960s and 1970s who was voted the club's greatest ever player. Johnstone is so well loved by Celtic fans that two memorial statues have been erected in his honour, outside Celtic's Parkhead stadium and in his hometown of Viewpark.

The biographical film, directed by Jamie Doran, and narrated by Scottish comedian Billy Connolly, includes footage from many of Johnstone's footballing highlights, as well as many tributes from the worlds of football and entertainment. The film culminates with Jimmy joining Jim Kerr and Charlie Burchill (from Simple Minds) to record a cover of the Ewan MacColl classic, "Dirty Old Town", which was later released as a charity single, to raise money for the Motor Neurone Disease Association.
