= Najibullah Quraishi =

Afghan journalist and filmmaker

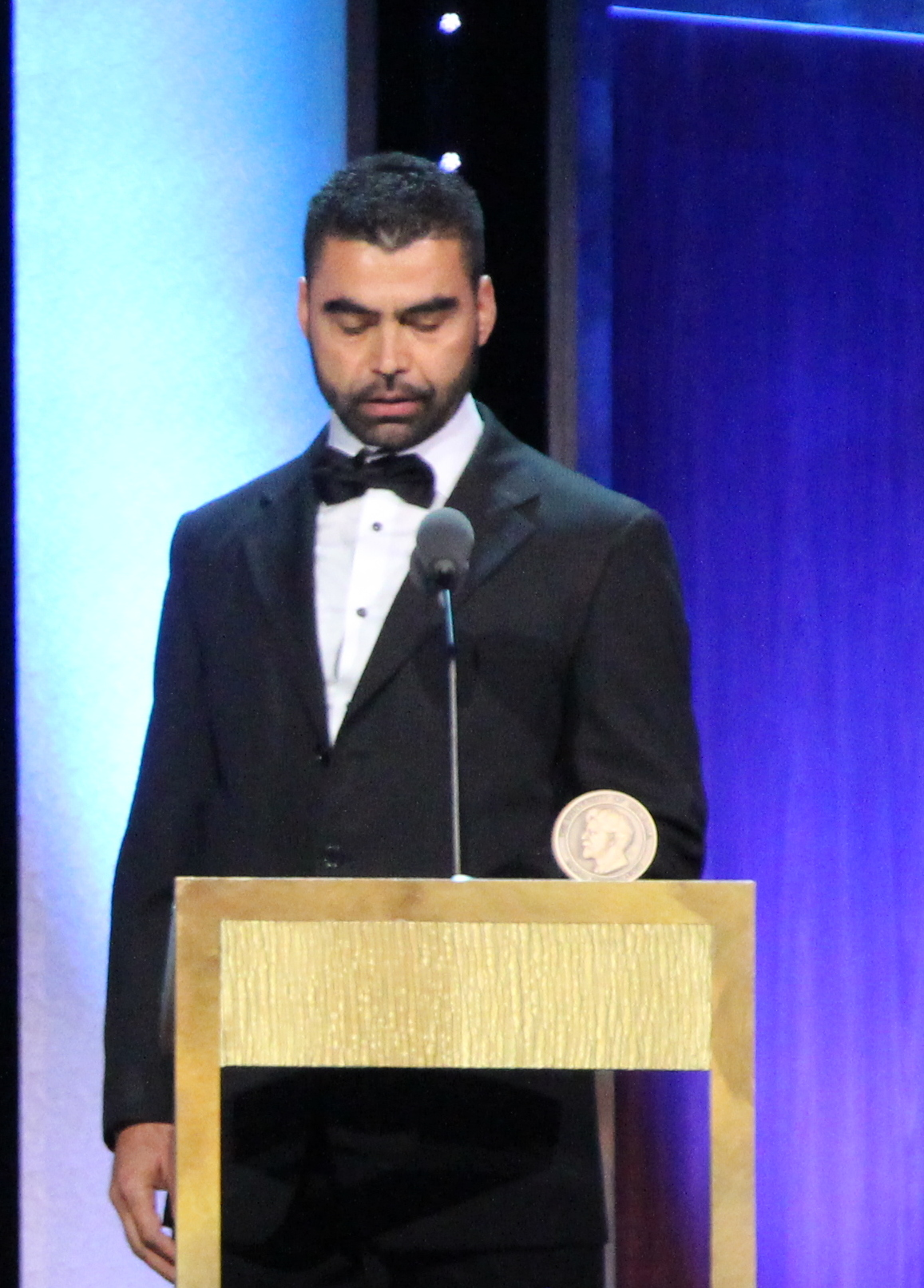
Najibullah Quraishi in 2016

Najibullah Quraishi is an Afghan journalist and filmmaker.

Quraishi worked as a journalist and presenter on radio and television in Afghanistan for ten years and has a degree in journalism. Quraishi is Clover Films chief investigator for projects in Asia and the Arab states. He has worked with Jamie Doran in making Afghan Massacre: The Convoy of Death, Afghanistan: Behind Enemy Lines, and The Dancing Boys of Afghanistan. Since 2002 he has lived in the United Kingdom and he is a winner of the Rory Peck Award, the Sony International Impact award and Amnesty International Media Award for his work.

His professional career began in Afghanistan, where he worked as a producer, reporter and presenter for a weekly television social program Shahr-e ma, Khana-e ma (Our City, Our Home) for ten years before moving to the United Kingdom and joining Clover Films in 2002. After successfully collaborating on the film Afghan Massacre: Convoy of Death, in the same year he won The Rory Peck Impact and Sony International Award for a film about the SAS in Afghanistan.

Since joining the Clover Films, where he works as director, reporter and cameraman as well as chief investigator for documentary films in Asia and Arab countries, he produced a total of six films and won several awards including the Alfred I DuPont Award 2011 (the ‘broadcast Pulitzer’, presented by the Graduate School of Journalism, Columbia University); the History Makers Award 2011 for ‘Best Current Affairs Documentary’; One World Media Award ‘Best Documentary’ 2010; BAFTA nomination ‘Best Documentary’ 2010; AIB (Association of International Broadcasters) Award ‘Best Current Affairs Documentary’ 2010; AIB Award ‘Best Investigative Documentary’ 2010; UNAFF (United Nations Association Film Festival); Winner of the Rory Peck and Sony International Impact awards(twice, 2002 and 2010) ‘Best Documentary Award’ 2010; Grierson Award: Shortlisted for ‘Best Documentary on a Contemporary Issue’ 2010.

His most recent works include The Dancing Boys of Afghanistan, a series of films for WNET/Wide Angle (women in war and peace); Behind Taliban Lines, Fighting for Osama, Opium Brides (aired January 3, 2012 from PBS Frontline), and Taliban Country (aired January 21, 2020 on PBS Frontline).

== See also ==
- Afghan Massacre: The Convoy of Death
- Bacha bazi
