= Dasht-e Leili =

Desert in the Jowzjan Province of Afghanistan

Location of the Dasht-i-Leili pits (36°39′24.17″N 65°42′20.71″E) near Sheberghan, Afghanistan

Dasht-e Leili (English: Leili Desert; Persian: دشت لیلی) is a desert in the Jowzjan Province of Afghanistan.

== Mass graves of the Afghan Civil War ==
In May–July 1997, following the first battle of Mazar-i-Sharif during the Afghan Civil War, forces loyal to Abdul Malik Pahlawan dumped more than 2,000 summarily executed Taliban prisoners of war into at least 20 mass graves in the Leili Desert. A year later, when the Taliban retook the city in August 1998, they massacred thousands Kochi civilians and soldiers in the city (as well as numerous indiscriminate killings of others such as Uzbeks and Tajiks), dumping hundreds to thousands of them in the Leili Desert as well. In December 2001, an unknown number of hundreds to thousands of Taliban prisoners of war were killed, likely by Junbish-i Milli, and also dumped in the Leili Desert near the city of Sheberghan. This event, which became known as the "Dasht-i-Leili massacre", occurred during the 2001 U.S. invasion of Afghanistan.
