= Siege of Kunduz =

2001 military operation

Coordinates: 36.7333°N 68.8667°E

- Part of the 2001–2021 War in Afghanistan
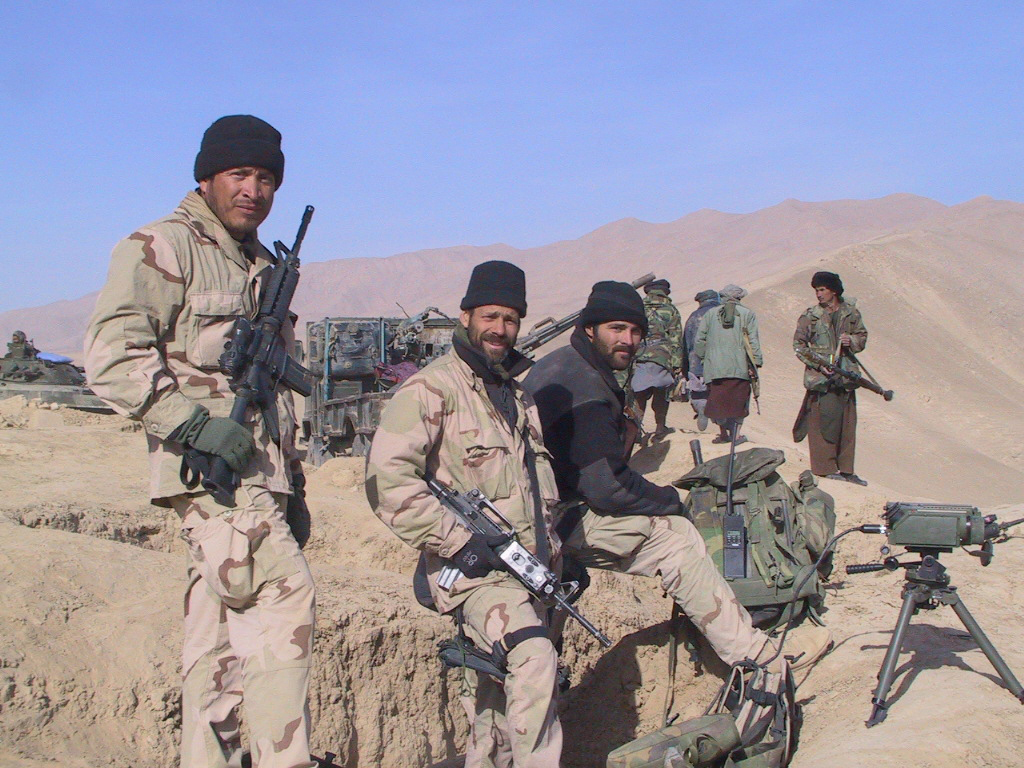
- US Army Special Forces soldiers with Northern Alliance fighters outside Kunduz in November 2001
Date	11 November 2001 – 25 November 2001 (2 weeks)
Location	Kunduz, Afghanistan
Result	Northern Alliance and US victory

Belligerents
Northern Alliance; United States	Islamic Emirate of Afghanistan; Taliban al-Qaeda; IMU

Commanders and leaders
(Afghanistan) Mohammed Daud Daud (Afghanistan) Abdul Rashid Dostum (United States) Tommy Franks	Mullah Fazl (surrendered); Mullah Noori (surrendered)

Strength
(Afghanistan) 10,000 (United States) 12 advisers	5,000 Taliban; 3,000 foreign fighters

Casualties and losses
(Afghanistan) Unknown (United States) None	2,000 killed or wounded, 3,000 to 3,500 surrendered 2,000–5,000 allegedly escaped by airlit (denied by the US and Pakistan)

The siege of Kunduz occurred during the 2001 United States invasion of Afghanistan. After the fall of Mazar-i-Sharif on 9 November, the focus of the Northern Alliance advance shifted towards the city of Kunduz, which was the last remaining Taliban stronghold in northern Afghanistan.

== The siege ==
Forces under the command of General Mohammed Daud Daud rendezvoused with American Special Forces advisers and advanced on Taloqan, arriving outside the city on 11 November. There, General Daud persuaded the local Taliban leader to switch sides, thus capturing the city without firing a single shot.

After seizing control of Taloqan, Daud's forces advanced on the city of Kunduz. In an attempt to achieve a victory without relying on US assistance, Daud launched a frontal assault on the city without informing the Americans. The attack ended in a disastrous failure, resulting in the deaths of several hundred Northern Alliance fighters. Following this setback, Daud regrouped his forces and laid siege to the city, this time relying on American air support to weaken the Taliban defenses. For the next eleven days, US warplanes bombarded Taliban positions, destroying 44 bunker complexes, 12 tanks, 51 trucks as well as numerous supply dumps, while inflicting losses of 2,000 killed or wounded. The defenders of Kunduz included a disproportionately large number of foreign fighters, including Arab, Chechen and Uzbek jihadists as well as Pakistani trainers and ISI operatives.

On 22 November, Daud's forces captured the nearby town of Khan Abad, tightening the siege. With their defensive position deteriorating, the Taliban forces inside Kunduz entered into negotiations to surrender on 23 November. Many of the city's defenders were able to escape with Pakistani assistance. At least 2,000 of the defenders inside Kunduz, including senior al-Qaeda members, were airlifted out of the city by Pakistani forces with tacit US approval, although both countries denied that this airlift occurred. Some Northern Alliance leaders blamed the US for allowing the airlift to occur and expressed a desire for revenge against the foreign fighters who had been inside the city. After the final Taliban surrender on 25 November, reports began to emerge of Northern Alliance fighters looting the city and conducting executions of captured Taliban fighters. The foreign fighters were treated much more harshly than the Afghan Taliban members. The two Taliban commanders that had led the defense of Kunduz, Fazl and Noori, would later be shipped off to the Guantanamo Bay prison on the island of Cuba.

== Dasht-i-Leili massacre ==
Human rights groups estimate that between 200 to over 1,500 captured prisoners died in or after transit to Sherberghan prison. The deaths became known as the Dasht-i-Leili massacre. Allegations have been made, notably by columnist Ted Rall and Jamie Doran's 2002 documentary Afghan Massacre: The Convoy of Death, that US troops were involved. A July 2009 New York Times report caused US president Barack Obama to order a probe into how the Bush administration handled calls for investigation of the massacre.
