= Mohammed Daud Daud =

Afghan police chief (1969–2011)

General Mohammad Daud Daud
- ستر جنرال محمد داود داود
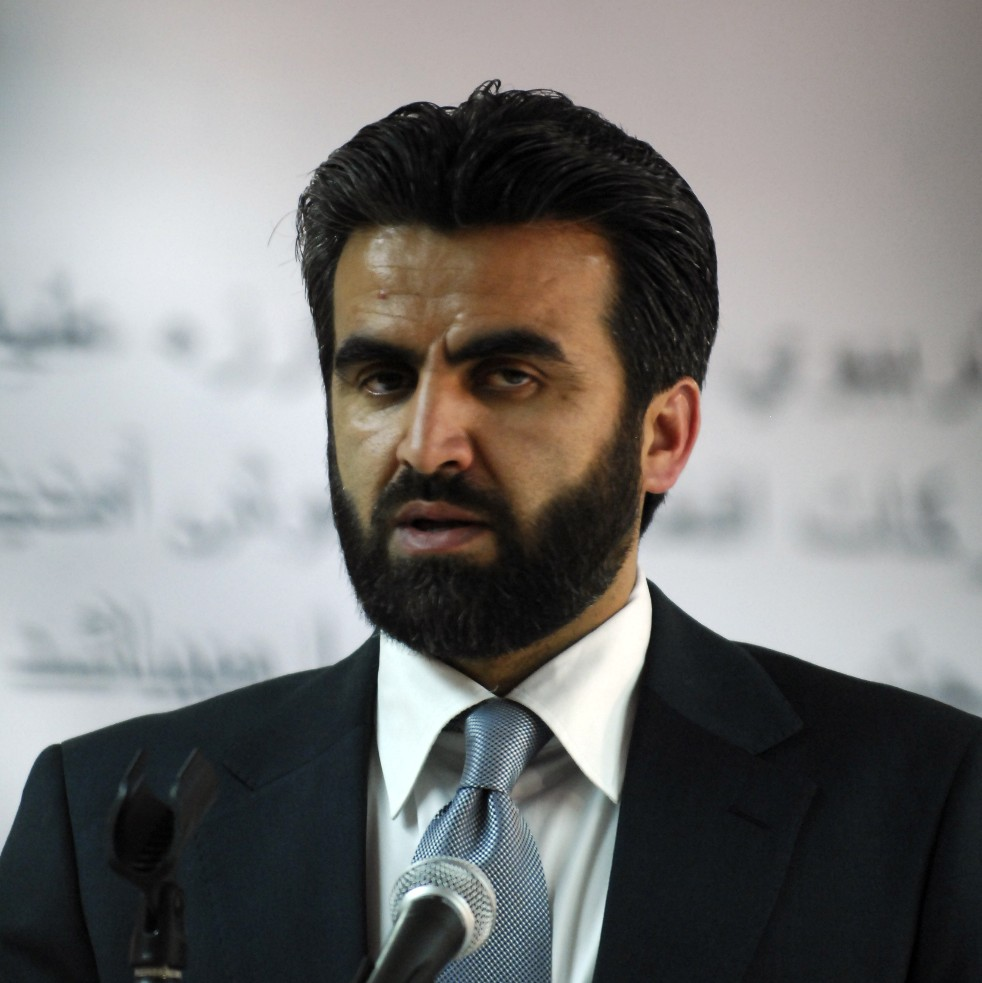
- Daud in January 2008
- Born: 1 January 1969; Takhar Province, Afghanistan
- Died: 28 May 2011 (aged 42); Takhar Province, Afghanistan
- Military career
- Branch: Mujahid, Police and Military of Afghanistan
- Service years: 1980s–2011
- Rank: Lieutenant general, Deputy Minister of Interior for Narcotics, 4th Star General(awarded poshumously),
- Commands: Commander And Massoud Assistant during the Soviet–Afghan War; Commander of the Central forces anti-Taliban United Islamic Front under Ahmad Shah Massoud; Governor of Takhar In Islamic GOV.; Commander of the 06 Military Corp (October 2001); Deputy Interior Minister (2004 Feb); Police Chief of Northern Afghanistan and Commander of the 303 Pamir Corps (2010–2011)
- Conflicts: Soviet–Afghan War; War in Afghanistan (1996–2001); War in Afghanistan (2001–present)

Mohammad Daud Daud (محمد داوود داوود, Mohammad Daud Daud; January 1969 – 28 May 2011) was a Tajik Afghan general. He was the general commander of the police in North/North-Eastern Afghanistan, and Deputy Minister for Counter-Narcotics of the Ministry of Interior until 2010.

He died on 28 May 2011 from gunshot wounds after he was injured by a Taliban mine planted in the Takhar governor's office.

== Personal History ==
In the 1980s, he joined the forces of Com. Seyyed Hossein (known as Doctor Hossein), one of the prominent commanders of the Islamic Jamiat of Afghanistan. After the assassination of Commander Seyyed Hossein by Golbuddin Hekmatyar, Daud joined Ahmad Shah Massoud and was appointed first as a finance department member of the Jamyat e islami, before acting as the special assistant to Massoud.

After the withdrawal of the Soviet Union and the fall of the Democratic Republic of Afghanistan, internal conflicts led to the formation of a new movement called the Taliban in Kandahar. The Taliban advanced and took over the government of Burhanuddin Rabbani, leading to the fall of Afghanistan. Ahmad Shah Massoud decided to negotiate and meet with them when they arrived in the Maidan Shahr, the center of Wardak province, located south of Kabul. Massoud met the Taliban with some of his companions (Daud Daud, Asadullah Khalid, Abdul Rahim Maali), listening to their demands. However, Massoud, in his capacity as the Minister of Defence of the Islamic government, soon realised that it was not possible to negotiate with this group and returned. The leadership of the Islamic government, led by Burhanuddin Rabbani, was determined to take the war out of Kabul so that the citizens of Kabul, who were severely damaged during the civil war, would no longer suffer.

Commander Massoud then ordered Daud to keep their forces away from the capital and take command of the central forces in the northeast.

When the Taliban took over the government in Afghanistan, he led his forces against the Taliban until December 2001, when the Taliban were completely defeated. After which, he continued to remain in his position (commander of the central forces and governor of Takhar province) and fought against their periodic insurgencies. His efforts led to the successful clearing of Takhar and Kundoz provinces from Taliban and Al-Qayeda.

He was more in the battlefield and fighting terrorism than sitting in the office, because of this, the insecurity in the north was reduced by 80%.

Hamid Karzai, whose first deputy was Marshal Fahim, accused him of genocide against the Pashtuns (from ethnic groups).

== Daud and the Battle of Kunduz ==
Daud was responsible for overseeing the November 2001 siege of Kunduz, the last major battle in the assault to topple the Taliban. During the siege of Kunduz all sides of the city were surrounded by Northern Alliance forces. Inside the city there were estimated to be 20,000-30,000 Taliban fighters, many of whom had vowed to fight to the death, rather than surrender. In Kunduz during the November 2001 siege were the so-called "Afghan Arabs", foreign volunteers believed to be led by Osama bin Laden. According to General Mohammed Daud, a pro-Taliban leader named "Omar al-Khatab" was leading a force of 1,000 foreign fighters belonging to Osama bin Laden's al-Qaida network. Little was known about the foreign Taliban. According to Afghan Taliban soldiers taken prisoner by the Northern Alliance, the foreigners did not fight side by side with the Taliban, but in separate units, under their own commanders. During the siege the mayor of Kunduz travelled through the surrounding mountains to meet General Mohammed Daud of the Northern Alliance, supposedly in a garden near Taloqan. Following the meeting, the mayor was ready to surrender, but needed time to negotiate with the foreign volunteers, who opposed surrender. In an effort to end the siege, Daud promised the low-ranking Taliban fighters fair treatment if they surrendered: "We will allow the low-ranking foreigners to appear before a court." On 27 November 2001 street-to-street fighting began at 7 am in Kunduz, when Northern Alliance troops led by General Mohammed Daud advanced into town. The remaining Taliban were defeated and Kunduz fell under Northern Alliance control. After victory at the siege of Kunduz and the subsequent establishment of the Interim Government in Afghanistan, Daud was appointed as Military commander of Corps No 6 in Kunduz /Kunduz province.

== Daud's political career ==
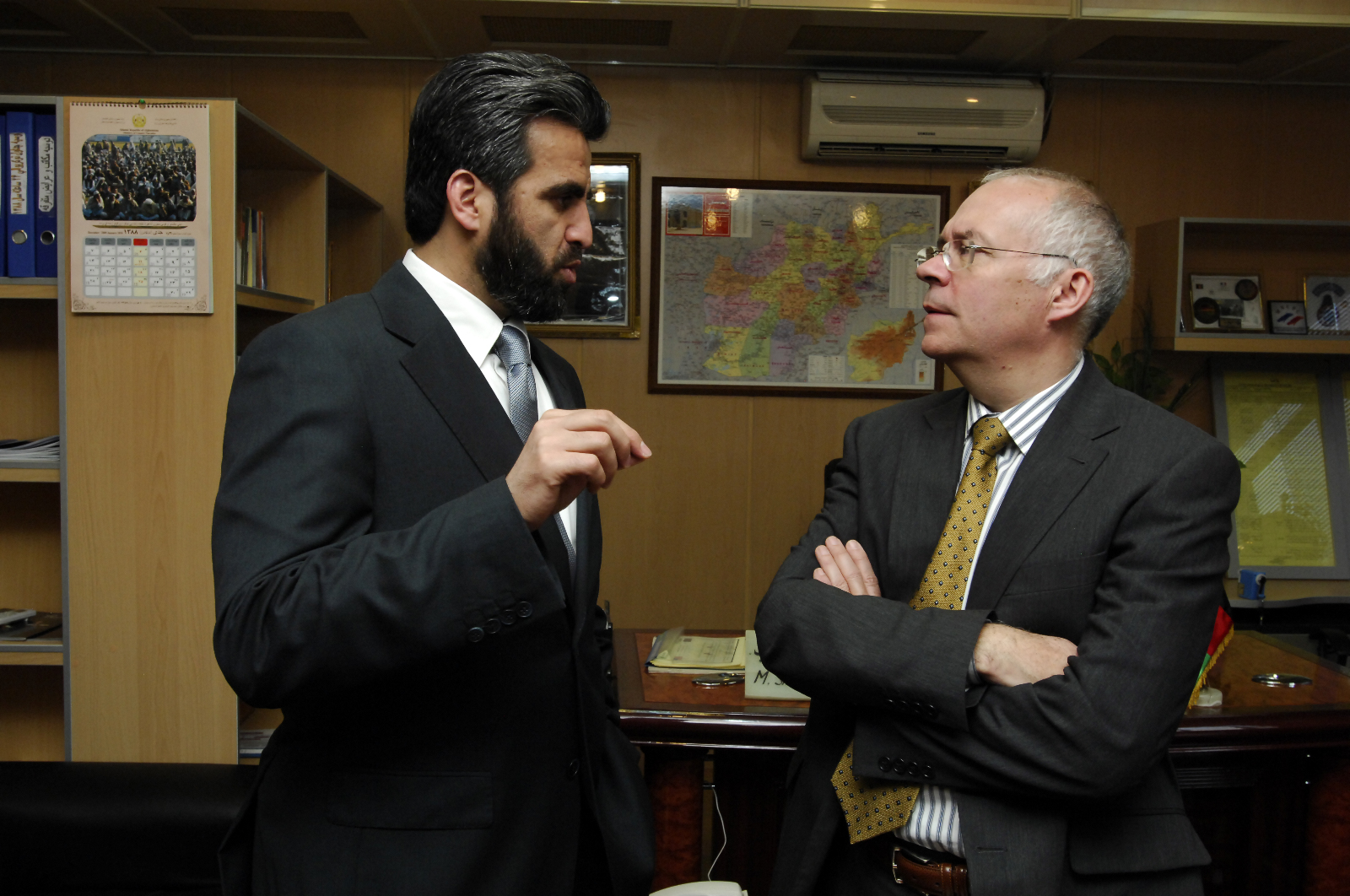
Daud speaking with Canadian Ambassador to Afghanistan William Crosbie in January 2010.

Daud was the former governor of the Takhar province in Afghanistan.

General Mohammed Daud was named Deputy Ministry of Interior for Counternarcotics by Afghan President Hamid Karzai in October 2004. Counternarcotics enforcement activities have been directed from within the Ministry of Interior since 2002. He was also the head of the Counter Narcotics Police of Afghanistan (CNPA). Daud and his staff worked with U.S. and British officials in implementing the Afghan government's expanded counternarcotics enforcement plan. Soon following his appointment, Daud led an Afghan delegation that participated in a thirty night session of the sub-commission on illicit Drug Traffic and related matters in the Near and Middle East (HONLEA) in Beirut, Lebanon. Delegates from twenty-one countries participated in the meeting. General Mohammad Daud delivered a presentation on the counter narcotics activities of the government of Afghanistan, achievements and problems still being faced. During his tenure, drugs were controlled in many parts of Afghanistan. His campaign against opium poppy cultivation was successful in several provinces, including Logar, Ghazni, Wardak, Paktia, Helmand, Urozgan Paktika and Badakhshan. Daud expressed optimism about Afghanistan's efforts to halt the opium trade, saying "We witnessed a remarkable reduction in the level of poppy cultivation all over Afghanistan last year. We worked very hard in the provinces where poppy cultivation was higher last year. The poppy eradication campaign is extensively under way in 11 provinces. Some 45,000 jeribs [9,000 hectares] of poppy cultivated land have so far been cleared. The campaign will start in 11 other provinces soon."

However, his financial and public support to Dr. Abdullah Abdullah in the presidential election led to the elected president, Hamid Karzai, threatening to expel him.

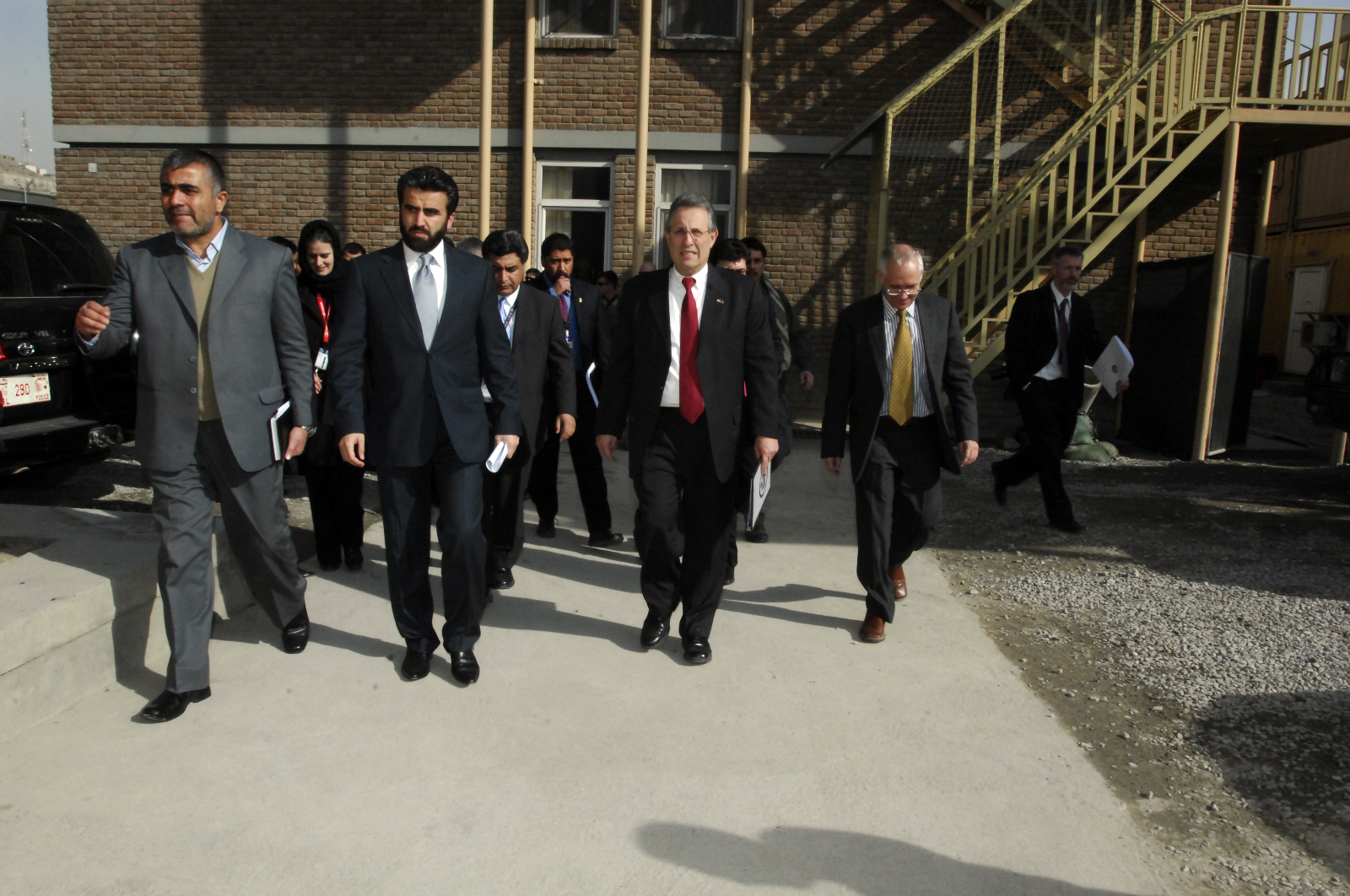
Daud with E. Anthony Wayne, William Crosbie and others.

President Hamid Karzai took steps to establish landlocked Afghanistan as a trade hub connecting the Middle East, Central Asia and Europe. Daud was involved in Karzai's plan to rehabilitate the war-torn Afghan economy. In late December 2002, Daud led an economic trade delegation to neighboring Tajikistan. Kabul has been particularly interested in swiftly opening trading routes in Central Asia, where there is a vast market for Afghan goods.

Daud was also involved in Afghanistan's Disbandment of Illegal Armed (DIAG). DIAG is a program within the Afghan Ministry of Interior. DAIG supports the Afghan government's objectives to bring stability to Afghanistan through the continuing process of demilitarization. The program also focuses on removing from office those government officials with proven links to illegal armed groups. Daud said that DIAG is not a program to take only weapons from individuals but that it is a program to disband the armed groups in order to ensure a sustainable safe and secure country.

== Fight against Taliban terrorism ==
=== Acid attack on Afghan schoolgirls ===
On 12 November 2008 attackers in Afghanistan sprayed acid in the faces of at least 15 girls near a school in Kandahar. One of the girls who was attacked was quoted as saying, "We were going to school on foot when two unknown people on a motorcycle came close to us and threw acid in our faces", 16-year-old Atifa told the BBC." At least two of the girls were blinded by the attack. General Mohammad Daud was tasked to deal with the incident. The attack on the girls, who had been wearing all-covering burqas, drew wide condemnation including from President Hamid Karzai and U.S. First Lady Laura Bush.

Daud said authorities had arrested ten men for the crime a few days after the attack. He said at a press conference that "The attack was the work of the Taliban and we have not finalised our investigation", and told the BBC that "the attack was the work of the Taliban" and that the attackers "were taking orders from the other side of the border [with Pakistan] from those who are leading terrorist attacks in Kandahar." Daud told reporters that the ten Afghans arrested had been promised 100,000 Pakistani rupees (US$1,300) each by Taliban in Pakistan. Many of them confessed to the attacks. Daud said his ministry had opened a bank account to collect money for the girls' medical treatment and education.

=== Military operations ===
In March 2011 a BBC crew was embedded with Daud's forces during a battle against the Taliban in Baghlan. The journalist described:

The man in charge of the offensive was a soft-spoken and charismatic general named Mohammed Daoud Daoud. ... Everywhere he went, Daoud stressed the need to respect the local population. He was saying all the right things from the international community's point of view. It made me wonder whether he had political ambitions. But this was also the right way to fight an insurgency. It made military sense. In one meeting of his commanders, he said: "If the arbakis [local militias] do anything wrong, disarm them, handcuff them, and bring them to me. No exceptions." He went on: "Some of these guys are mad; some of them are on drugs. They are an embarrassment. But this time, they are part of the operation." So why let them join the assault at all? He explained that they knew the terrain and the people. He needed them "only as guides." A few days before the offensive was due to start, he called about 20 arbaki commanders into his office. They sat on rows of folding chairs as he delivered a speech about the need to respect human rights. As they stood up to leave, he added, "If any of your men rape the local women, I will hang them."

— Paul Wood (BBC), 2011

== Counter-narcotics campaign ==
=== Opium in Afghanistan ===
Opium from Afghanistan provides more than 90 per cent of the world's total supply, funding international drug syndicates with billions of US dollars in profits every year. Daud said that more than 110,000 people were actively involved in drug business across the country. This number had been estimated by the United Nations Office on Drugs and Crimes (UNODC). In June 2007 Daud estimated there were over 1,000 smugglers, including some government officials arrested over the previous three years. Daud stated in an interview: "Our job as a law enforcement agency is to make sure eradication is done and farmers are not cultivating opium poppy.We want to put some 4–5 traffickers in jail from each poppy producing province to make an example ... The other side is the poverty of the farmers. We, the Afghan state, will do our part; there will be no more poppy cultivation. But it is the responsibility of the big donors to provide alternative livelihoods, alternative crops and development to the farmers, both short term and long term." The head of the UN's drugs agency said in 2010 that the Taliban had made $US100 million the previous year by levying a 10% tax on opium-growing farmers. In response to the illicit opium trade, Daud reported that counter-narcotics activities had been "boosted considerably" since 2007. During the first eight months of 2007, over 300 tonnes of cannabis, over 25 tonnes of opium and over 10 tonnes of heroin, as well as several tonnes of heroin-producing chemicals, were impounded. Twenty-five heroin-producing laboratories were also destroyed, according to the Interior Ministry.

In December 2008 Daud spoke at a U.N. conference in Kabul, Afghanistan, and said that Afghan law enforcement agencies needed international assistance in training and equipment. He talked about lack of security and linkage between drug-trafficking and terrorism as well as profound corruption in the police and the army. His presentation highlighted the Ministry of the Interior's strategy in the field of counternarcotics. These included dismantling drug-trafficking networks/organizations, poppy eradication and crop substitution. Daud informed the participants that the "poppy eradication force" would complete its training soon and would be deployed to the southern provinces of Afghanistan. He noted that the force would be responsible for manually eradicating poppy plantations. He called for international support to continue with the poppy eradication programme and to expand the crop substitution programme to other provinces. The General suggested posting liaison officers to Pakistan, Iran and Tajikistan in order to foster international cooperation. Afghanistan had signed agreements with a number of countries and was in the process of signing memorandums of understanding with neighboring countries aimed at improving cooperation, information-sharing, and controlled delivery operations, according to the General. His ministry's activities in strengthening security at the borders and airports and establishing border control liaison officers were also emphasized.

In February 2009 Daud said that he was hopeful that the poppy crop production in Afghanistan would probably drop by 50 per cent that year. He said that Taliban and smugglers had joined, and posed a bigger threat to the Afghan government. Counter-narcotics police came under enemy attack during the counter-narcotics drive in several occasions, inflicting casualties on the law-enforcers, he said. The campaign against poppy was successful in Logar, Ghazni, Wardag, Paktia, Paktika and Panjshir provinces.

=== Taliban and opium ===
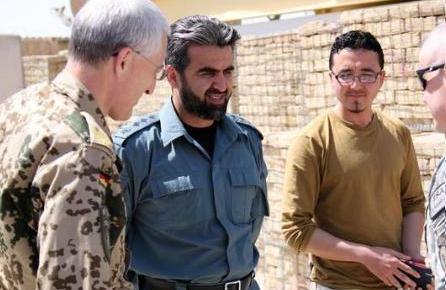
General Daud (center) speaking with members of ISAF in May 2011.

The opium trade has been a continuing source of financing for the Taliban. Taliban insurgents force farmers to grow opium poppies to fund their operations. Daud was recently quoted as saying, "The Taliban have forged an alliance with drug smugglers, providing protection for drug convoys and mounting attacks to keep the government away and the poppy flourishing." General Mohammad Daud was further quoted in The New Yorker about this alliance, saying, "There has been a coalition between the Taliban and the opium smugglers. This year, they have set up a commission to tax the harvest." In return, he said, the Taliban had offered opium farmers protection from the government's eradication efforts. The switch in strategy has an obvious logic: it provides opium money for the Taliban to sustain itself and helps it to win over the farming communities. In a continued effort to curb the opium trade in Afghanistan Mohammed Duad reported in June 2008 that police in Kabul set fire to 7.5 tonnes of narcotics. In April 2009, the Afghan anti-drug officers burned more than six-and-a-half tons of seized heroin, opium, hashish and drug-manufacturing chemicals worth up to £70 million on the UK market. "If we do not burn the drugs, thousands of others will become drug addicts", said Daud, deputy minister for counter narcotics at the Interior Ministry. By burning this amount of opium and narcotics we show the people we are committed to the fight against drugs."

=== Mobile opium processing labs ===
Reports seem to suggest Afghan drug traffickers are turning to new concealment methods. Mobile processing labs started to be seen at the end of 2003 and beginning of 2004. These processing labs can be difficult to locate. According to Daud "reports and tip-offs" have to be relied on in order to find them. Daud added: "Previously, they were using wood in their big laboratories. They could not move [them] and we started to find their laboratories, so they decided to make all their laboratories into mobile labs so they can carry them to different places. They started using gas and diesel [as fuel]." Afghan counter-narcotics police point to key smugglers having strong links with processing laboratories and say that laboratories are sometimes heavily guarded.

After Mawlana Saidkhaili [Abdul Rahman Saidkhaili], I accepted to be killed while serving my people. I say this every morning when I leave my home and I am ready to be killed.

"They have a lot of weapons, and in some areas they are supported by government officials," said Daud, although he would not reveal in which areas guarded laboratories had been a particular problem. A Kandahar resident who has had close contact with the drugs trade said that laboratories, often just comprising metal drums and a large press, are mainly located in the border areas. The location of laboratories in these areas points to the involvement of Pakistani chemists.

== Death ==
Daud was assassinated in a Taliban bomb attack in Taloqan, after a meeting held in the headquarters of the provincial governor of Takhar Province. Six people, including two German soldiers, were killed. The commander of ISAF troops in North Afghanistan, General Markus Kneip, was wounded. The Taliban claimed responsibility for the attack, with the Islamic Movement of Uzbekistan also believed to have played a role. Takhar's influentials and officials hold Lt. General Zalmai Weesa, the commander of the national army in the north, and Abdul Jaber Taqwa, the governor of Takhar, responsible for his death.

Burhanuddin Rabbani, the former president, and Abdullah Abdullah, head of the National Coalition, called on the government to conduct an immediate investigation into the killing.

Before General Daud Daud, Khan Mohammad Mujahid, the police commander of Kandahar (in the south of Afghanistan) and Abdul Rahman Seyedkheli, the police commander of Kunduz (in the northeast) were also killed by suicide attacks.

== Narcotics trade allegations ==
Daud was accused of being involved in the narcotics trade and using his post as head of the counter-narcotics police to provide safe passage to smugglers.
