= Nazar ila'l-murd =

Sufi practice

The meditation known in Arabic as naẓar ila'l-murd (Arabic: النظر إلى المرد), "contemplation of the beardless" or Shahidbaazi (Persian: شهید بازی / شاهدبزى) is a Sufi practice of spiritual realization.

Peter Lamborn Wilson claims this as the use of "imaginal yoga" to transmute erotic desire into spiritual consciousness.

Richard Francis Burton's translation of The Book of the Thousand Nights and a Night (commonly called The Arabian Nights in English) included collections of stories that were often sexual in content and were considered pornography at the time of publication. In particular, the Terminal Essay in volume 10 of The Arabian Nights contained a 14,000 word essay entitled "Pederasty" (Volume 10, section IV, D) in which Burton speculated and opined that male homosexuality was prevalent in an area of the southern latitudes named by him the "Sotadic zone". Rumors about Burton's own sexuality were already circulating and were further incited by this work.

== Criticism ==
Islamic theologians condemned the custom of contemplating the beauty of boys. Nazar was denounced and deemed a heretic by Ibn Taymiyya (1263–1328). Those who engaged in it were duly punished.

== See also ==
- Bacha bazi
- Ghilman
- Köçek
