= Jamie Doran =

Irish-Scottish independent documentary filmmaker

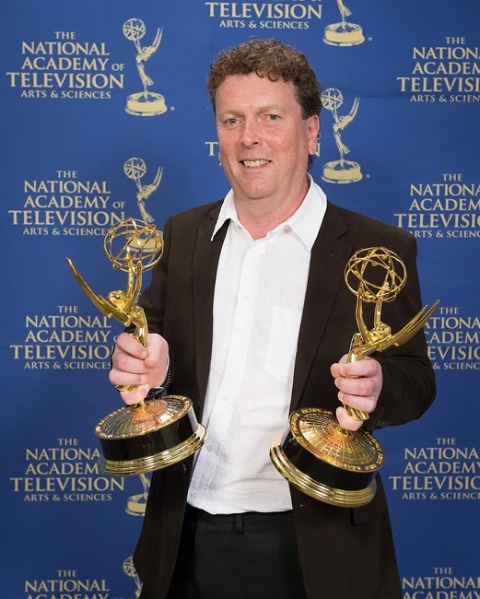
- Doran at the 34th Annual News and Documentary Emmy Awards
- Born: Glasgow, Scotland
- Occupations: Documentary maker, writer
- Spouse: Tracey Doran-Carter
- Writing career
- Genres: Current affairs, conflict, human rights
- Subjects: Warfare, human rights, sport, science fiction culture, Afghanistan, Pakistan, Russia, Chile, Romania
- Notable awards: 2017 New York Film Festival awards EMMY Awards; Peabody Award duPont Colombia Awards Amnesty International UK Media Award
- Website: www.clover-films.com

Jamie Doran is an Irish-Scottish independent documentary filmmaker and former BBC producer. He founded the award-winning company Clover Films, based in Windsor, in 2008. He is also president of Datchet Village Football Club, which he founded in 1986. Doran's films have been shown worldwide, and on series such as BBC's Panorama, Channel 4's Dispatches, Channel 4's True Stories, PBS's Frontline, Al Jazeera, ABC's Four Corners, Japan's NHK, Germany's ZDF NDR/ARD and Denmark's DR.

Many of Doran's documentaries cover the lives of people caught up war zones around the world. His 2017 film The Boy Who Started the Syrian War, which has received over 100 million views globally, centers on the story of how anti-Assad graffiti created by schoolboys had reportedly started the Syrian civil war. In 2016, his film ISIS in Afghanistan won two Emmy awards in the outstanding continuing coverage of a news story in a news magazine, and the best report in a news magazine categories, as well as a Peabody award and three awards at the New York Film Festival.

In 2014, his film Pakistan's Hidden Shame exposed the sexual abuse of street boys in Peshawar. The film won the grand jury award for best documentary at the United Nations Association Film Festival and received high commendation from the Association for International Broadcasting. His 2012 film Opium Brides focused on the collateral damage of the counter-narcotic effort in Afghanistan. It won an Emmy for outstanding investigative journalism, and the duPont–Columbia award. In 2010, his film The Dancing Boys of Afghanistan revealed the widespread and systematic child sex abuse by former Northern Alliance commanders.

== Filmography ==
Doran has directed and produced numerous documentaries, including:

Year	Title	Plot
2021	The Fans Who Make Football: Celtic FC	This documentary explores what it means to be a fan of Celtic football club.
2019	KGB - The Sward and the Shield	
2018	Crimea: Russia's Dark Secret	The documentary reveals the occupation of Crimea by Russia, and Russia's systematic and blatant violations of human rights on the territory of the peninsula.
2017	ISIL Target Russia	This film journeys deep into the impregnable mountains of northern Afghanistan, where thousands of ISIL fighters are training and plotting an attack on Russia.
2017	The Boy Who Started the Syrian War	An intimate look at the war in Syria through the eyes of Mouawiyah Syasneh, the boy whose anti-Assad graffiti lit the spark that engulfed Syria.
2016	ISIS and the Taliban: The Journey	Doran journeys to Afghanistan to join Zubair Massoud, adviser to the national security council. They travel through some of the most dangerous territory in the world, to discover just how bad the situation really is after the withdrawal of most NATO forces two years previously.
2015	The Taliban Hunters	This film follows the 'Taliban Hunters,' Karachi's elite police unit who are fighting back against Taliban militants in an attempt to regain control of the dangerous city.
2015	Kenya's Enemy Within	An investigation into whether the wall promised by Kenya on the border of Somalia, in response to al-Shabab attacks, is already too late.
2015	ISIS in Afghanistan	A special report that reveals how ISIS is on the rise in Afghanistan, and how they are targeting and training children to join Jihad in the war-torn country.
2015	Living Beneath the Drones	A film that investigates the devastating impact that war and living under the constant threat of drones has on the mental health of the people of Afghanistan.
2014	Syria's Second Front	A film which looks at the complexities of Syria's civil war. It is no longer the regime fighting president al-Assad, but they are also facing ISIS, who are quickly gaining ground and imposing their own barbaric rule.
2014	On the Front Lines with the Taliban	With unprecedented access, this film follows Taliban fighters, as they launch an attack against the Afghan National Army from the Taliban stronghold in Charkh district, just an hour outside the Afghan capital, Kabul.
2014	Arming the Rebels	This film offers a rare glimpse into a covert programme by US intelligence forces who have been training and arming select groups of Syrian rebels out of a previously reported location, in Qatar.
2014	The Girls of the Taliban	A film which explores the new wave of privately run madrasahs that are opening across Afghanistan. As well as meeting the girls who study there, their families and the men behind the schools, the feeling among women's rights groupsis also captured - they fear their already limited freedoms are again under threat.
2014	Pakistan's Hidden Shame	A film directed by Mohammed Naqvi focusing on a culture in Peshawar of sexual abuse of street children. It was screened at Sheffield Doc/Fest in June 2014.
2012	The Battle for Syria	Doran and Guardian correspondent Ghaith Abdul-Ahad travel to the frontline where rebel fighters face the forces of Bashar al-Assad's regime, witnessing the deadliest period of the fighting so far.
2012	Opium Brides	Najibullah Quraishi journeys deep into the Afghan countryside to reveal how ISAF poppy eradication programmes are forcing Afghan peasant farmers into debt with drug mafias. When they cannot pay, the traffickers take their daughters.
2012	In the Hands of Al Qaeda	Ghaith Abdul Ahad investigates how Al Qaeda was able to capture Yemeni towns and cities from right under the noses of the United Statesand the Sana'a administration.
2011	Pakistan's Open Secret	An observational documentary following a flamboyant 'family' of transgender people as they hustle and scrape together a living on the streets of Karachi.
2011	The Promoters	An investigation into extra judicial killings in Kenya, where human rights workers accuse police of killing more than 8,500 young men in the last ten years alone.
2011	Sudan: The Break Up	Made for Al-Jazeera, this three part series charts the troubled history of Sudan from pre-colonial times to the present day.
2010	The Dancing Boys of Afghanistan	This controversial and widely acclaimed film shows how former Northern Alliance warlords and powerful businessmen are preying on impoverished young boys in Afghanistan. The ancient tradition of Bachi Bazi (translation: boy-play) was banned under the Taliban, but has resurfaced since they were routed by ISAF in late 2001. Boys as young as 11 are bought and sold like slaves, dressed up like women and made to dance before audiences of men. The Dancing Boys of Afghanistan exposes how these boys are systematically sexually abused, and frequently murdered by jealous rival owners. Despite these practices being illegal under Afghan law, the film shows that the men committing the abuse do so with impunity. This film premiered at the Royal Society of Arts on 29 March 2010. It was aired on PBS Frontline in the United States, and True Stories in the UK on 20 April 2010.
2010	Afghanistan: Behind Enemy Lines	Broadcast in February, 2010, as an episode of Dispatches on the British television network, Channel 4, this film shows how fighters from the proscribed extremist Islamic group, Hezb-e-Islami, are opening a new battlefront in Northern Afghanistan. Filmed by the Rory Peck Award winning British-Afghan journalist, Najibullah Quraishi, who spent 2 weeks with these fighters, Afghanistan: Behind Enemy Lines includes footage of the fighters constructing planting and detonating roadside bombs (or IEDs). Peter Beaumont, foreign affairs editor of the Guardian newspaper, described the film as "An extraordinary and intimate documentary depicting the lives of fighters within the Taliban's insurgency in Afghanistan". This film was broadcast on PBS Frontline as Behind Taliban Lines in February 2010. This film was nominated for a British Film and Television Academy Award in the Best Current Affairs programme category. In June 2010 it won the One World Media Award for best TV documentary.
2009	Africa Rising	This film documents the failure of Western development policy in Africa, and shows how a community of impoverished Ethiopian farmers are working themselves out of poverty through collectivization and micro-finance initiatives. It won the 2010 One World Media MDGs Award, being described by judges as "superbly shot and uplifting ... a compelling piece of work that drew the viewer into the heart of a community as it struggled to shake off a dependency culture".
2007	Whiskey in the Jar	Documenting life on the remote Irish island of Tory, the only place in Ireland with an appointed sovereign.
2004	Jimmy Johnstone: Lord of the Wing	A film on Jimmy 'Jinky' Johnstone, a Celtic and Scotland football hero of the 1960s and 70s who struggled with motor neurone disease.
2004	Guinea Pig Kids	Shown on BBC2, this programme exposed how anti-HIV drugs were tested on "vulnerable and poor children at a New York care home ... who had no choice in whether or not to take part in trials and no proper advocates to speak on their behalf". Describing HIV medicines given to the children as "futile" and "dangerous", the programme also demonstrated how children had been taken from their families to enable the "experimental" drug treatment to continue. Despite critics' charges that the programme was "lurid, untrue" and contained "dangerous lies" a BBC investigation did not uphold these complaints.
2003	The Need for Speed	Follows the investigation of two U.S. pilots in relation to a friendly-fire incident in the war in Afghanistan in which four Canadian soldiers died. The pilots' defence stated that they were flying under the influence of amphetamines given to them by the U.S. Air Force. Interviewees include former Chief of Staff of the United States Air Force, General Merrill McPeak. The pilots' amphetamine usage was also covered by the BBC and the New York Times.
2002	Afghan Massacre: The Convoy of Death	Interviewees presented as eyewitnesses state that several thousand Taliban prisoners of war were transported to Sheberghan prison in sealed containers and that hundreds or thousands of prisoners died. Afghans interviewed in the film claim that U.S. personnel were present and involved in mass killings. A preliminary version of the documentary was shown to the European Parliament and the German Parliament in June 2002, under the title Massacre at Mazar, prompting calls for investigations from human rights bodies. The Pentagon denied allegations of U.S. involvement and released a statement, saying "U.S. Central Command looked into it a few months ago, when allegations first surfaced when there were graves discovered in the area of Sherberghan prison. They looked into it and did not substantiate any knowledge, presence or participation of US service members." An August 2002 report in Newsweek, based on a UN memo, described a mass grave site in the Dasht-i-Leili desert, but said there was no evidence that U.S. personnel had been involved. The story resurfaced in July 2009, when U.S. President Barack Obama asked his national security team to look into allegations that the Bush administration had resisted calls to have the matter investigated.
2001	The Android Prophecy	Documentary history of robots in the cinema that draws dark conclusions about the future of mankind, featuring contributions from Arthur C. Clarke, Steven Spielberg and Ridley Scott.
2001	City of Murder and Mayhem	Life in post-Soviet era Moscow: the film documents a month in the life of one of Russia's new breed of oligarch bankers, and shadows an elite police unit tasked with tackling organised crime.
1998	Starman	A sixty-minute biographical film for BBC Television of Yuri Gagarin, the first human in space. Doran also co-wrote a book on Gagarin with the popular-science writer, Piers Bizony.
1997	Sexpionage	The story of the young women who were forced by the KGB to seduce foreign military personnel, businessmen and diplomats in order to elicit secrets from them. Includes first-hand testimony from former KGB agents, some of the women involved, as well as American intelligence analysts.
1994	The Red Bomb	A three-part series on the Soviet Union's first nuclear bomb, built in 1949, years before the West thought the Soviet Union had the capability to build such a bomb. Features interviews with former Soviet spies and scientists.

== Articles and interviews ==
- Amy Goodman (2014-09-30). Interview with 'Afghan Massacre' director Jamie Doran about Afghanistan's new vice president, notorious warlord Abdul Rashid Dostum, Democracy Now!
- Christiane Amanpour (2014-09-01). Interview with Jamie Doran about the sexual abuse of boys in Pakistan, CNN International
- Shihab-Eldin, Ahmed (2014-05-28). 'Syria: Arming The Rebels' producer Jamie Doran tells #WorldBrief about the covert U.S. training and arming program of Syrian rebels, HuffPost Live
- Steinberg, Stefan (2002-06-17). Interview with Jamie Doran, director of Massacre at Mazar, World Socialist Web Site
- "Did U.S. Forces Allow a Massacre of 3,000 Taliban Prisoners to Occur?" BuzzFlash asks Jamie Doran, Producer-Director of "Afghan Massacre: The Convoy of Death", BuzzFlash Interview, 2003-09-23
- Doran, Jamie (2002-09-02). AFGHANISTAN'S SECRET GRAVES: A drive to death in the desert, Le Monde Diplomatique
