= Sheberghan Prison =

Prison in Afghanistan

Coordinates: 36.667°N 65.7336°E

The Sheberghan Prison is a prison in northern Afghanistan. Following the 2001 battle of Qali-Jangi, in Mazari Sharif, Afghan warlord General Dostum sent many of the surviving captives to Sheberghan Prison.

They were reported to be transported to the prison in industrial shipping containers, in conditions that were said to be extremely crowded, with many of the captives dying in transit. When the prisoners complained that they were suffocating, General Dostum's troops allegedly fired directly into the containers, killing some men, but the bullet holes providing limited ventilation for the others.

In 2009 the BBC News reported that new United States President Barack Obama had committed his administration to look into the claims about atrocities at Sherberghan.

== See also ==
- List of prisons in Afghanistan
