= Battle of Qala-i-Jangi =

2001 prisoner uprising in northern Afghanistan

- Part of the War in Afghanistan and the Afghan Civil War
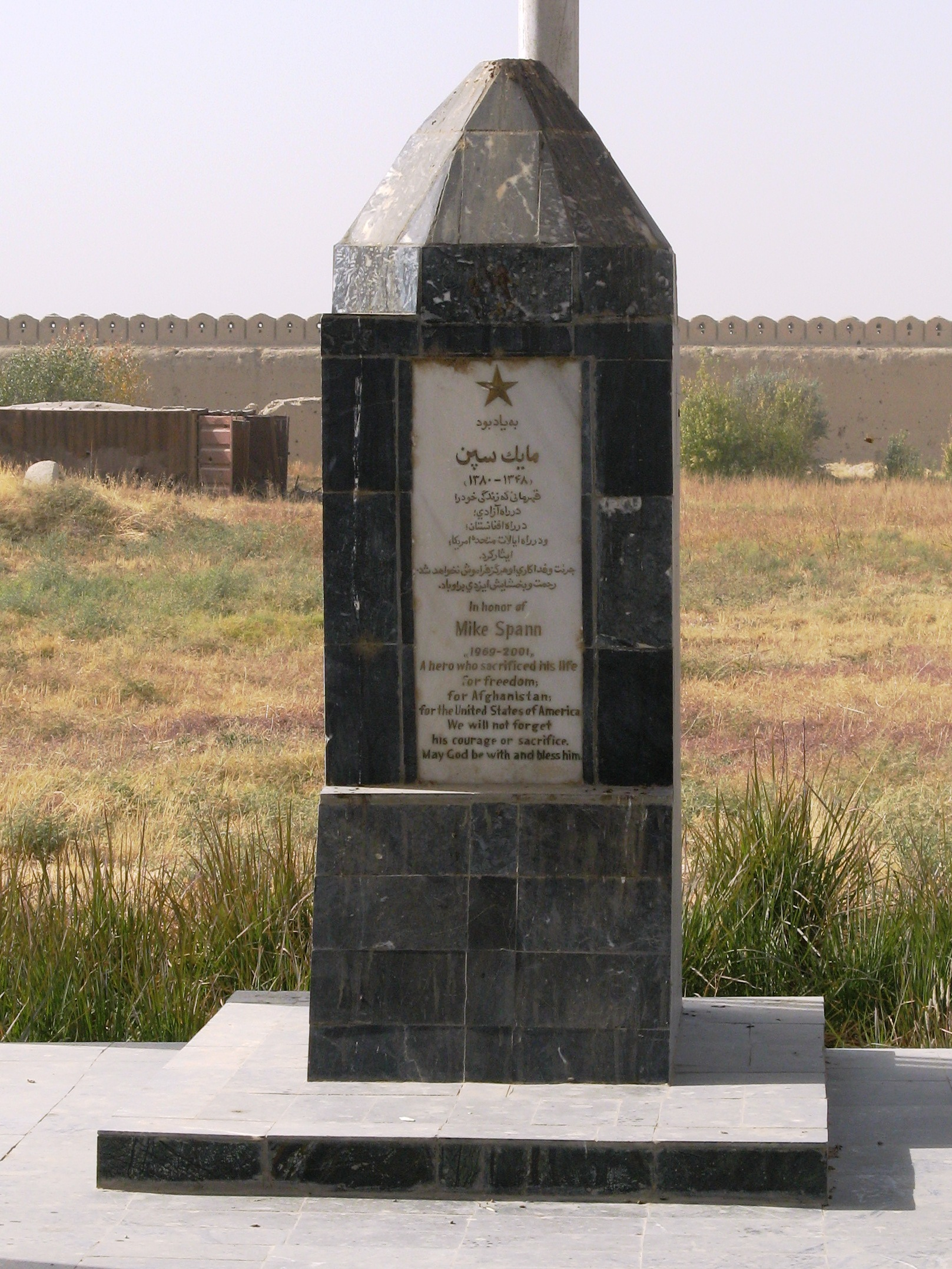
- Johnny Micheal Spann's memorial at Qala-i-Jangi in 2007.
Date	25 November 2001 – 1 December 2001 (6 days)
Location	Qala-i-Jangi, Balkh Province, Afghanistan 36°40′N 66°59′E
Result	Coalition victory

Belligerents
Coalition: Northern Alliance; United States; United Kingdom	Prisoners: Taliban al-Qaeda; Islamic Movement of Uzbekistan; East Turkistan Islamic Party

Commanders and leaders
General Abdul Rashid Dostum; Major Mark E. Mitchell	Unknown

Strength
Unknown	586+

Casualties and losses
73 Afghans killed 250 Afghans wounded 1 American killed 9 Special Operations soldiers (5 Americans and 4 British) wounded	500+ killed 86 re-captured

The Battle of Qala-i-Jangi in Afghanistan (sometimes also referred to as the "Battle of Mazar-i-Sharif") was a six-day military engagement following an uprising of prisoners of war who had been taken into custody by U.S.-led coalition forces on 25 November 2001. The battle took place from 25 November to 1 December, in northern Afghanistan. It followed the intervention by United States-led coalition forces to overthrow the Taliban's Islamic Emirate of Afghanistan, which had been harboring al-Qaeda operatives.

More than 400 foreign fighters surrendered outside Mazar-i-Sharif and were held at Qala-i-Jangi fortress by the Afghan Northern Alliance forces, where they were interrogated by the anti-Taliban warlord Abdul Rashid Dostum's fighters and Central Intelligence Agency (CIA) personnel hunting al-Qaeda suspects. The prisoners, who had not been searched properly when they surrendered, violently revolted and the ensuing fighting escalated into one of the bloodiest engagements of the conflict. It took Northern Alliance fighters, assisted by British and American special forces and air support, six days to quell the revolt.

All but 86 of the prisoners were killed as well as a number of Northern Alliance fighters. The only U.S. fatality was the CIA officer Johnny Micheal Spann, the first American to be killed in combat during the 2001 U.S. invasion of Afghanistan. Among the surviving prisoners were two American citizens suspected of fighting with the Taliban: Yaser Esam Hamdi and John Walker Lindh. Five American troops were wounded at Qala-i-Jangi on November 26, 2001, and were awarded the first Purple Hearts of the Afghanistan war. Navy SEALs Master Chief Petty Officer Stephen R. Bass was awarded a Navy Cross and Green Beret Major Mark Mitchell was awarded a Distinguished Service Cross for actions during the battle. The CIA agent, David N. Tyson, was awarded the Distinguished Intelligence Cross and Spann was awarded a posthumous Intelligence Star. Special Boat Service (SBS) members, Captain Jess and Corporal Tony, were awarded the Conspicuous Gallantry Cross.

== Background ==
The former "Pink House" holding the Taliban and Al Qaeda prisoners in the Fortress of Qala-e Jangi. Photographed 2025

In late November 2001, Taliban commanders, facing defeat in northern Afghanistan, agreed to surrender to the Northern Alliance warlord General Abdul Rashid Dostum, leader of the ethnic-Uzbek dominated National Islamic Movement of Afghanistan, outside the besieged city of Kunduz. The surrender was negotiated at Qala-i-Jangi on November 21 between Dostum and Taliban commanders Mullah Mohammed Fazl and Mullah Norullah Noori. At 03:00 on November 24, more than 400 Al Ansar "guest" foreign fighters (mostly from Arabic-speaking countries of the Middle East) also surrendered their weapons, including a large group that had arrived in a convoy one day earlier to a place 100 kilometres (62 mi) away from the agreed capitulation site, close to Mazar-i-Sharif. Dostum described the Taliban surrender as a "great victory" for the Alliance, a bloodless success that would allow the future reconciliation of citizens of Afghanistan. Thousands of prisoners were transported to the Sheberghan Prison where it was alleged that many of them died due to mistreatment during and after the transport.

The CIA wanted to question the foreign fighters about the activities of al-Qaeda. On the evening of November 24, it was decided to transfer the prisoners to Qala-i-Jangi ("the war fortress" in Dari), a 19th-century fortress near Mazar-i-Sharif that Dostum had previously used as his headquarters and ammunition depot. None of the prisoners being moved to the Qala-i-Jangi fort were Afghans. Many of them were Arabs, from Egypt, Saudi Arabia, Yemen, and the Gulf states. There were also Azerbaijanis, Dagastanis, Filipinos, Indonesians, Kazakhs, Kyrgyz, Pakistanis, Tajiks, Tatars, Turks, Uighurs, and Uzbeks. The group also included Africans from Algeria, Morocco, Nigeria, and Sudan. A few fighters appeared to be white Westerners. Foreign suspects were transported on flatbed trucks to the fortress, now turned into a prison. The prisoners had not been searched, and some had concealed weapons during the surrender. On the day of the surrender, two prisoners committed suicide with grenades and killed one of Dostum's commanders and some others in two separate incidents at the makeshift prison. Despite the deaths, the National Islamic Movement militia did not reinforce security at the prison. John Kerry's report for the United States Senate Committee on Foreign Relations later alleged it was a preplanned "Trojan Horse"-style operation, a gambit that would allow a diehard force of foreign fighters to take over a strategically important fortified position at Qala-i-Jangi and capture a massive munitions stockpile.

== Uprising ==
On 25 November, two CIA officers, Johnny Micheal Spann from the paramilitary Special Activities Division, and David Tyson, a case officer, Uzbek speaker and regional expert, arrived at Qala-e-Jangi to carry out prisoner interrogations in the fort's courtyard. The CIA officers questioned selected prisoners, especially Sulayman al-Faris who was an American citizen born as John Walker Lindh(at the time, they noticed only that Lindh was a European-looking prisoner and different from the others, so he was singled out for an interrogation). Approximately two hours after the interviews began, a number of prisoners, some of them with concealed grenades, suddenly stood up and attacked their captors, who were outnumbered about four to one. Attacking in a suicidal manner, revolting prisoners overran and killed Spann and several Afghan guards; they also appeared to be often much better trained than their Northern Alliance captors, many of whom were shocked and frightened by their enemies' display of skill and fanaticism. The prisoners managed to take over the southern half of the fortress, including the armory and ammunition depot, seizing a large store of small arms, grenades, rocket-propelled grenade launchers, mortars and ammunition.

With Spann missing in the chaos, Tyson escaped to the northern and more secure part of the fortress, where he was trapped with a television crew from the German ARD network. He borrowed their satellite phone, and called his wife Rosann at their home in Tashkent, before then calling the U.S. embassy in Uzbekistan. He spoke to Major Mike Davison, a United States Air Force (USAF) officer, telling him not to send any air support due to the proximity of allied Afghan forces. A 15-man rescue force was sent from the Turkish school, a base in Mazar-e-Sharif, made up of 9 Green Berets, and eight men from Z Squadron Special Boat Service. Northern Alliance reinforcements also arrived, sending fighters and a T-55 tank into the compound, where they started firing into the prisoner-controlled area. Several other television crews reached the battle, resulting in much of the fighting being filmed. At 14:00, the rescue force arrived, joining the Afghans in firing at the prisoners from the northern part of the fort. From 16:00 until nightfall, despite Tyson's requests, the force directed two U.S. Navy F/A-18 Hornets to drop nine 500-pound GBU-12 Paveway II laser-guided bombs on the armory, which was serving as a base of fire for the entrenched prisoners. Tyson, German journalist Arnim Stauth and others fled just before dusk. Navy SEAL Stephen Bass then advanced to the western tower of the fort, locating the body of Spann, with his actions during the battle earning him the Navy Cross.

The next day, Dostum's forces set up a command post near the northern gate to direct their tank and mortar fire. By midmorning, they were joined by U.S./British forces divided into three teams: a close air support team that went inside the fortress along the bottom of the northeast tower to direct bombing strikes into the southern courtyard, a second close air support team that positioned itself near the main gate of the fortress, and a quick reaction force consisting of four more Special Forces troops, a U.S. Navy surgeon, and soldiers from the 10th Mountain Division. At 11:00, a GBU-31 JDAM guided bomb, weighing 2,000 pounds (957 kg), was dropped from a U.S. Marine Corps F-18C Hornet, mistakenly hitting a friendly position after the pilot entered the wrong coordinates. The bomb's explosion killed several Afghans and wounded many others on the northeast tower, flipped over a T-55 tank, and wounded five U.S. and four British operators. That night, two AC-130H Spectre gunships circled over the fortress, firing at the prisoners. The main ammunition store was hit, creating a massive explosion that continued to burn throughout the night. Some prisoners managed to escape from the fort, only to be captured and lynched by the local population.

On the 27 November, the third day of the fighting, the allied forces mounted a systematic assault supported by tanks and other armored vehicles, defeating a counterattack by the prisoners. By the end of the day, they had recaptured most of the fort, at that point facing sporadic gunfire and some suicide grenade attacks. Afghans recovered Spann's body early on 28 November. It was assumed by this point that nearly all of the prisoners were dead, but over 100 surviving prisoners had retreated to the basement dungeon of a central building. They were discovered only when body collectors attempted to enter, with the prisoners killing them and injuring two others. Northern Alliance fighters fired and threw in grenades and explosives into the basement, and even poured oil in and tried to set it alight, but the resistance continued. Later on 28 November, General Dostum arrived and personally tried to persuade the last prisoners to surrender, to no effect. The next day, Dostum ordered the dungeon flooded with frigid irrigation water. This tactic worked and the last holdouts finally surrendered on 1 December. Of the more than 400 prisoners brought to the fortress, just 86 emerged alive from the flooded basement. Some survivors later claimed they did not participate in the battle. One also told The Observer reporter Luke Harding that some wanted to surrender earlier, but a group of seven Arabs took control and did not let them.

== Aftermath ==
Of the 86 prisoners who survived the battle, one was found to be John Walker Lindh, an American convert to Islam who had moved to Afghanistan prior to the September 11 attacks in order to help the Taliban battle the Northern Alliance. Shortly after the battle, an embedded journalist working for CNN, Robert Young Pelton, managed to identify the badly injured and hypothermic Lindh as an American. Lindh was then separated from other prisoners and his life was saved by an American Special Forces medic. Lindh was later repatriated to the United States to face charges of treason. In 2002, he was found guilty of aiding and supporting the enemy and sentenced to 20 years in prison without parole.

In early 2002, at least 50 other surviving prisoners were transferred to Camp X-Ray at the newly constructed Guantanamo Bay detention camp at the U.S. Naval Base at Guantanamo Bay, Cuba. They were mostly Arabs, including 21 Saudis and nine Yemenis, but there were also some nationals from other countries such as Russian national Rasul Kudayev (from Kabardino-Balkaria), who had allegedly joined the Afghanistan-based Islamic Movement of Uzbekistan (IMU), and Abdul Jabar, an Uzbek member of the IMU. In 2004, after three years of detention without trial (at first at Camp X-Ray, until his identity was discovered), the U.S. citizen Yaser Esam Hamdi won a landmark U.S. Supreme Court case, Hamdi v. Rumsfeld, which affirmed the right of U.S. citizens to habeas corpus and trial; he was released from United States custody without charges and was deported to his native Saudi Arabia.

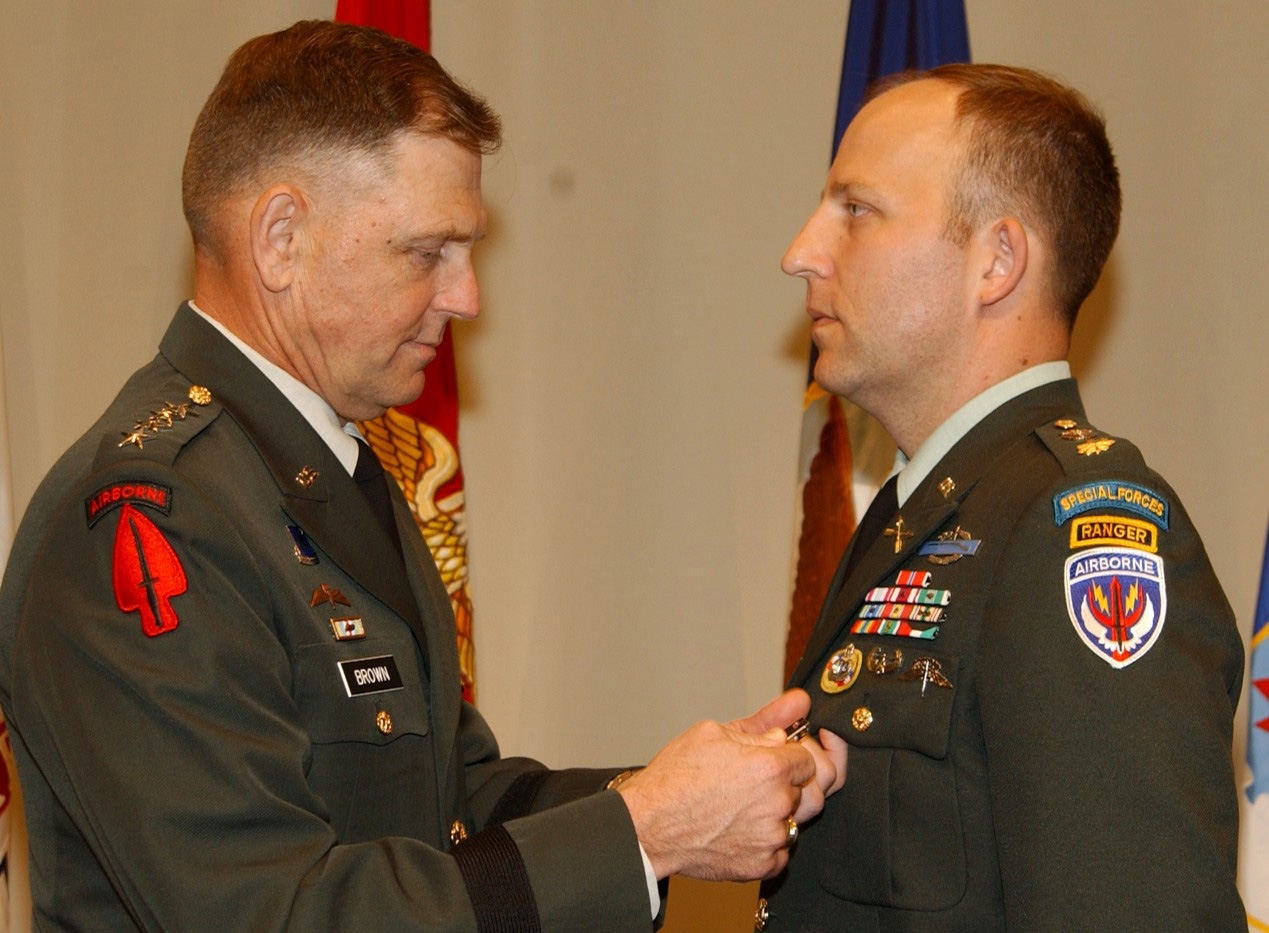
Major Mark E. Mitchell being decorated for his combat actions during the battle by General Bryan D. Brown, chief of the U.S. Special Operations Command

For his actions during the battle, Major Mark E. Mitchell, a U.S. Army Special Forces officer, was awarded the Distinguished Service Cross, the first such decoration to be awarded since the Vietnam War. Additionally, a U.S. Navy corpsman, Chief Petty Officer Stephen Bass, was awarded the Navy Cross for his actions while attached to the British Special Boat Service. Bass' Navy Cross was the first Navy Cross awarded since Operation Just Cause. A biography of Bass can be found within the book The Navy Cross: Extraordinary Heroism in Iraq, Afghanistan, and Other Conflicts.

Spann, the only U.S. fatality, was recognized as the first American killed in combat during the U.S. 2001 invasion of Afghanistan. For his "extraordinary heroism" in fighting off the prisoners long enough to allow his colleagues to escape, Spann was posthumously awarded the CIA's Intelligence Star. He was buried in Arlington National Cemetery with full military honors due to his prior service in the Marine Corps, as well as his time in the CIA. Spann's family visited the fortress after his death, and were told by Afghan doctors who were present on site at the time of the riot that they "thought Mike might run and retreat, but he held his position and fought using his AK rifle until out of ammo, and then drew and began firing his pistol", and that the only reason that they and several others were able to live was "because Mike stood his position and fought off the prisoners while enabling them the time to run to safety."

== Controversies ==
Due to the high number of prisoner casualties, and the use of massive firepower against them, the Northern Alliance and the foreign coalition forces were accused of breaking the Geneva Conventions by using disproportionate means. American soldiers found a number of the dead with their arms tied behind their back. Abdulaziz al-Oshan, one of the detainees, later summarized the incident and told American authorities at Guantanamo Bay: "They called it an uprising and it's not; it's some kind of massacre." Amnesty International called for an independent inquiry, but the U.S. and British governments rejected this, arguing that the fierce and well-armed resistance of the uprising fully justified the use of airstrikes and heavy weapons against the revolting prisoners.

The Afghan forces were criticized for mismanagement of the prisoners, which is believed to have enabled the uprising. The captives were not properly searched and some carried grenades into the prison. Dostum later admitted this had been a mistake. Also, as Qala-i-Jangi had been previously a Taliban base, many of the prisoners had been there before and knew its layout. Dostum had planned to hold the men at a nearby airfield, but the U.S. was using it to ferry in supplies. By questioning the prisoners in a group, rather than separately, protected by few guards, the interrogators put themselves at risk with men known to be dangerous. George Tenet, director of the CIA, dismissed the accusations of mismanagement and praised his agents as "heroes"; in Bush at War, the journalist Bob Woodward described Spann as a hero whose actions saved the lives of many.

== Representation in other media ==
- In the documentary The House of War, Robert Young Pelton and filmmaker Paul Yule provided a detailed account of these events. Interviews and footage from CNN, ARD, and elsewhere (Dodge Billingsley and recovered interrogation footage) show Mike Spann and David Tyson moments before the uprising. Pelton's The World's Most Dangerous Places one-hour special "Inside Afghanistan" details his time with the U.S. Special Forces team (ODA 595) that fought with Dostum's troops.
- The incident was documented in the National Geographic documentary series Critical Situation "Taliban Situation" and by French reporter Damien Degueldre in Good Morning Afghanistan.
- Doug Stanton's nonfiction book Horse Soldiers: The Extraordinary Story of a Band of U.S. Soldiers Who Rode to Victory in Afghanistan opens with an account of the battle.
- Frederick Forsyth's novel The Afghan includes a partly fictional but detailed account of the battle and its context. Forsyth calls the captives the "six hundred most dangerous men in Asia." Out of 600, he counts 60 non-Arabs. The rest were "ultrafanatical" al-Qaeda Arabs who wanted to die and take an enemy with them to become a rewarded martyr.
- Damien Lewis's nonfiction book Bloody Heroes is a detailed account for the event with references and interviews from members of the SBS team.
- On the 19th anniversary of the battle, Tyson recounted the story of Spann's death, the battle that lead to it, and how he honored Spann's legacy in a podcast interview: Intelligence Matters.
- Toby Harnden's 2021 nonfiction book "First Casualty: The Untold Story of the CIA Mission to Avenge 9/11" contains eight out of 22 chapters on the Battle of Qala-i-Jangi

== See also ==
- Badaber Uprising, a similar uprising of the Soviet and Afghan communist captives in a fortress prison in Pakistan in 1985
- Fall of Mazar-i-Sharif, which involved a killing of hundreds of Taliban who were cornered by the Northern Alliance and U.S. forces in a school building in 2001
- Dasht-i-Leili massacre
