= John Walker Lindh =

American former extremist (born 1981)

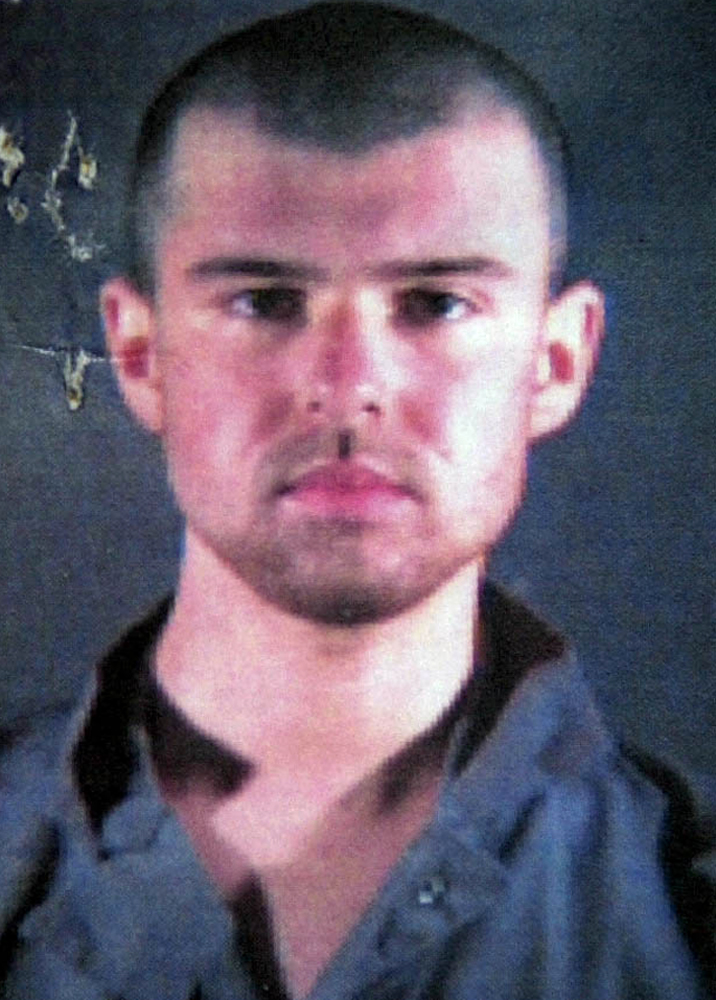
- Lindh in January 2002
- Born: John Philip Walker Lindh; February 9, 1981 (age 45); Washington, D.C., U.S.
- Other names: Sulayman al-Faris, Abu Sulayman al-Irlandi, Yahya
- Citizenship: United States; Ireland
- Occupation: Taliban member (formerly)
- Parent(s): Marilyn Walker and Frank Lindh
- Status: Released May 23, 2019; Supervision ended May 23, 2022
- Convictions: Supplying services to the Taliban (50 U.S.C. § 1705); Carrying an explosive during the commission of a felony (18 U.S.C. § 844)
- Penalty: 20 years imprisonment

John Philip Walker Lindh (born February 9, 1981) is an American former Taliban member who was captured by United States forces as an enemy combatant during the United States' invasion of Afghanistan in November 2001. He was detained at Qala-i-Jangi fortress, which was used as a prison. He denied participating in the Battle of Qala-i-Jangi, a violent uprising of the Taliban prisoners, stating that he was wounded in the leg and hid in the cellar of the Pink House, in the southern half of the fort. He was one of the 86 prisoners who survived the uprising, from an estimated 400 prisoners in total. CIA officer Johnny Micheal Spann was killed during that uprising. Brought to trial in United States federal court in February 2002, Lindh accepted a plea bargain; he pleaded guilty to two charges and was sentenced to 20 years in prison. He was released on parole on May 23, 2019, for a three-year period of supervised release.

A convert to Sunni Islam in California at age 16, Lindh traveled to Yemen in 1998 to study Arabic and stayed there for 10 months. He later returned in 2000, then went to Afghanistan to aid the Taliban in fighting against the Afghan Northern Alliance. He received training at Al-Farouq, a training camp associated with al-Qaeda, designated a terrorist organization by the United States and other countries. While at the camp, he attended a lecture by Osama bin Laden. After the September 11 attacks, he remained with the Taliban military forces despite learning that the U.S. had become allied with the Northern Alliance. Lindh had previously received training with Harkat-ul-Mujahideen, an internationally designated terrorist organization based in Pakistan.

Lindh went by the name Sulayman al-Faris during his time in Afghanistan but later preferred the name Abu Sulayman al-Irlandi. In early reports following his capture, when the press learned that he was a U.S. citizen, he was usually referred to by the news media as just "John Walker".

== Youth, conversion, and travels ==
Lindh was born in Washington, D.C., to Marilyn Walker and Frank R. Lindh, as the middle of three children in the family. He was named "John" after John Lennon, who was murdered two months before Lindh's birth. He was baptized a Catholic, and grew up in Silver Spring, Maryland. When he was 10 years old, his family moved to San Anselmo, California. Lindh suffered from an intestinal disorder as a child. At age 14, his health improved. He enrolled at Redwood High School as a freshman. He then transferred to Tamiscal High School in the Tamalpais Union High School District, an alternative school offering self-directed, individualized study programs. While there, he studied world culture, including Sunni Islam and the Middle East.

Lindh dropped out of the school and eventually earned an equivalent of a high school diploma by passing the California High School Proficiency Exam at age 16. As an adolescent, Lindh participated in IRC chatrooms with the IRC nickname Mujahid. He became a devoted fan of hip-hop music and engaged in extensive discussions on Usenet newsgroups, sometimes pretending to be an African-American rapper who would criticize others for "acting black". Spike Lee's 1992 film Malcolm X impressed him deeply and sparked his interest in Islam.

Although his parents did not divorce until 1999, their marriage was in serious trouble throughout Lindh's adolescence. His father often left their Marin County residence for extended periods to live in San Francisco with a male lover. Frank Lindh said he and Marilyn had been separated since 1997. Also in 1997, at the age of 16, Lindh converted to Islam. He began regularly attending mosques in Mill Valley and later in nearby San Francisco.

In 1998, Lindh traveled to Yemen and stayed for about 10 months to learn Arabic so that he could read the Qur'an in its original language. He returned to the United States in 1999, living with his family for about eight months. Lindh returned to Yemen in February 2000 and left for Pakistan to study at a madrasa. While abroad, Lindh exchanged numerous emails with his family. In one, his father told him about the USS Cole bombing, to which Lindh replied that the American naval destroyers being in the Yemen harbor had been an act of war, and that the bombing was justified. His father told Newsweek: "This raised my concerns, but my days of molding him were over."

At the age of 20, Lindh decided to travel to Afghanistan to fight for the Afghan Taliban government forces against Northern Alliance fighters. His parents said that he was moved by stories of atrocities allegedly perpetrated by the Northern Alliance army against civilians. He traveled to Afghanistan in May 2001. Tony West, his lawyer, explained it as follows: "One of the first things he told Army interrogators when they questioned him on December 3, 2001, was that after 9/11 happened, he wanted to leave the front lines but could not for fear of his life. John never wanted to be in a position where he was opposing the United States (and never thought he would be), and in fact he never opposed any American military."

== Capture and interrogation ==
Lindh surrendered on November 24, 2001, to Afghan Northern Alliance forces after his al-Qaeda foreign fighters unit surrendered at Kunduz after retreating from Takar. He and other fighters were to be questioned by the CIA officers Johnny "Mike" Spann and David Tyson at General Dostum's military garrison, Qala-i-Jangi, near Mazār-e Sharīf. During the initial questioning, Lindh was not advised of his (legal) rights, and his request for a lawyer was denied.

Lindh, whose paternal grandmother is from County Donegalis, had told other prisoners he was Irish. While being interviewed by the CIA, he did not reveal that he was American. Spann asked Lindh, "Are you a member of the IRA?" He was asked this question because, when questioned by Spann, an Iraqi in the group identified Lindh as an English speaker. Lindh had been told to say he was "Irish" to avoid problems. Moments later, around 11 am, the makeshift prison was the scene of a violent uprising, which became known as the Battle of Qala-i-Jangi. Spann and hundreds of foreign fighters were killed; only 86 prisoners survived. According to other detainees interviewed by journalist Robert Young Pelton for CNN, Lindh was fully aware of the planned uprising, yet remained silent and did not cooperate with the Americans.

Sometime during the initial uprising, Lindh was shot or hit by shrapnel in the right upper thigh and found refuge in a basement, hiding with the rest of the detainees. On the second day, the Red Cross sent in workers to collect the dead. As soon as they entered, the workers were shot by the prisoners, who killed one. The Northern Alliance repeatedly bombarded the area with RPGs and grenade attacks, and burning fuel poured in. Finally, on December 2, 2001, Northern Alliance forces diverted an irrigation stream into the middle of the camp to flush the remaining prisoners out of their underground shelters, drowning many in the process. Lindh and about 85 survivors from the original 300–500 were forced out of hiding. Northern Alliance soldiers bound Lindh's elbows behind his back.

Shortly after his recapture, Lindh was noticed and interviewed by Robert Pelton, who was working as a stringer for CNN. Lindh initially gave his name as "Abd-al-Hamid" but later gave his birth name. Pelton brought a medic and food for Lindh and interviewed him about how he got there. During the interview, Lindh said that he was a member of al-Ansar, a group of Arabic-speaking fighters financed by Osama bin Laden. Lindh said that the prison uprising was sparked by some of the prisoners smuggling grenades into the basement: "This is against what we had agreed upon with the Northern Alliance, and this is against Islam. It is a major sin to break a contract, especially in military situations". A U.S. Army Special Forces operator, fresh from three weeks of combat, gave up his bed so that the wounded Lindh could sleep there. Pelton repeatedly asked Lindh if he wanted to call his parents or have the journalist do so, but Lindh declined. Although Lindh was not tested for explosives or firearms residue before he was washed, an FBI source later told author Toby Harnden that dark stains on the right side of Lindh's face indicated he had fired a weapon at Qala-i Jangi.

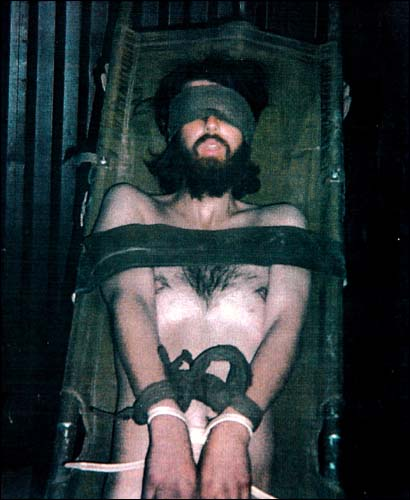
Lindh photographed after being transported to Camp Rhino

After capture, Lindh was given basic first aid and questioned for a week at Mazār-e Sharīf. He was taken to Camp Rhino on December 7, 2001, the bullet or piece of shrapnel still within his thigh. When Lindh arrived at Camp Rhino, he was stripped and restrained on a stretcher, blindfolded and placed in a metal shipping container, which was procedure for dealing with a potentially dangerous detainee associated with a terrorist organization. On the day he left the Turkish School, he was photographed with the words "Shit Head" written onto duct tape on his blindfold by Green Berets posing for a "team photo" with their captive. The Green Berets, from ODA 592, were later investigated. While bound to the stretcher at Camp Rhino, Lindh was photographed by some American military personnel. At Camp Rhino, he was given oxycodone/paracetamol for pain and diazepam.

On December 8 and 9, he was interviewed by the FBI, and was mirandized on December 9 or 10. He was held at Camp Rhino until he was transferred to the USS Peleliu on December 14, 2001, with other wounded detainees, where his wound was operated on and he received further care. He was interrogated before the operation on December 14. While on the Peleliu, he signed confession documents while in the custody of the United States Marine Corps. On December 31, 2001, Lindh was transferred to the USS Bataan, where he was held until January 22, 2002. He was flown back to the United States to face criminal charges. On January 16, 2002, Attorney General John Ashcroft announced that Lindh would be tried in the United States.

In 2002, former President George H. W. Bush referred to Lindh as "some misguided Marin County hot-tubber". The comment, in which Bush also mispronounced the county's name, provoked a minor furor from Marin residents and prompted a retraction of the statement by Bush. Lindh's attorneys told the press that his client had asked for a lawyer repeatedly before being interviewed by the FBI, but did not get one, and that "highly coercive" prison conditions forced Lindh to waive his right to remain silent. Although the FBI asked Jesselyn Radack, a Justice Department ethics adviser, whether Lindh could be questioned without a lawyer present, they did not follow her advice to avoid that scenario.

== Trial and sentencing ==
On February 5, 2002, Lindh was indicted by a federal grand jury on ten charges:

- Conspiracy to murder U.S. citizens or U.S. nationals
- Two counts of conspiracy to provide material support and resources to designated foreign terrorist organizations
- Two counts of providing material support and resources to terrorist organizations
- Conspiracy to supply services to the Taliban
- Supplying services to the Taliban
- Conspiracy to contribute services to al-Qaeda
- Contributing services to al-Qaeda
- Using and carrying firearms and destructive devices during crimes of violence

If convicted of these charges, Lindh could have received up to three life sentences and 90 additional years in prison. On February 13, 2002, he pleaded not guilty to all 10 charges.

The court scheduled an evidence suppression hearing, at which Lindh would have been able to testify about the details of the torture to which he claimed he was subjected. The government faced the problem that a key piece of evidence — Lindh's confession — might be excluded from evidence as having been coerced. Michael Chertoff, then head of the Criminal Division of the U.S. Department of Justice, then directed the prosecutors to offer Lindh a plea bargain. Lindh could plead guilty to two charges: supplying services to the Taliban (50 U.S.C. § 1705(b), 18 U.S.C. § 2, 31 CFR 545.204, and 31 CFR 545.206) and carrying an explosive during the commission of a felony (18 U.S.C. § 844(h)(2)). He would have to consent to a gag order that would prevent him from making any public statements on the matter for the duration of his 20-year sentence, and he would have to drop any claims that he had been mistreated or tortured by U.S. military personnel in Afghanistan and aboard two military ships during December 2001 and January 2002. In return, all other charges would be dropped. The gag order was said to be at the request of Secretary of Defense Donald Rumsfeld.

Lindh accepted this offer. On July 15, 2002, he entered his plea of guilty to the two remaining charges. The judge asked Lindh to say, in his own words, what he was admitting to: "I plead guilty. I provided my services as a soldier to the Taliban last year from about August to December. In the course of doing so, I carried a rifle and two grenades. I did so knowingly and willingly knowing that it was illegal." Lindh said that he "went to Afghanistan with the intention of fighting against terrorism and oppression", fighting for the suffering of ordinary people at the hands of the Northern Alliance. On October 4, 2002, Judge T.S. Ellis III imposed a sentence of 20 years in federal prison.

Some activists and academics called for Lindh to tell his story. The government invoked the Son of Sam law and informed Lindh that any and all profits made from book deals or any movies about Lindh's experience would be automatically transferred to the federal government. Lindh, his family, his relatives, his associates and his friends will be unable to profit financially from his crimes and/or experiences. Lindh's attorney, James Brosnahan, said Lindh would be eligible for release in 17 years, with good behavior. Lindh agreed to cooperate "fully, truthfully and completely" with both military intelligence and law enforcement agencies in the terrorism investigation.

== Imprisonment ==
In January 2003, Lindh was sent to the U.S. Penitentiary, Victorville, a high-security facility northeast of Los Angeles. On March 3, 2003, Lindh was tackled by inmate Richard Dale Morrison. He assaulted Lindh at prayer, causing bruises on his forehead. On July 2, 2003, Morrison was charged with a misdemeanor count of assault. Lindh was held in federal Supermax ADX Florence in Florence, Colorado, for a short time. He served his sentence as prisoner 45426-083, at the Federal Correctional Institution at Terre Haute, Indiana, in the Communication Management Unit.

In April 2007, citing the reduced sentence for the Australian prisoner David Matthew Hicks, Lindh's attorneys made a public plea for a presidential commutation to lessen his 20-year sentence. In January 2009, the Lindh family's petition for clemency was denied by President George W. Bush in one of his final acts in office. According to the U.S. Department of Justice, all "special administrative measures" in place against Lindh expired on March 20, 2009, as part of a gradual easing of restrictions on him.

In 2010, Lindh and the Syrian-American prisoner Enaam Arnaout sued to lift restrictions on group prayer by Muslim inmates in the Communication Management Unit. On January 11, 2013, a federal judge ruled in their favor, saying that the government had shown no compelling interest in restricting the religious speech of the inmates by prohibiting them from praying together.

In 2013, Lindh secured Irish citizenship through his paternal grandmother, Kathleen Maguire, who was born in Donegal.

In February 2015, Lindh wrote to a California television producer, expressing support for ISIS or the Islamic State, the militant group that had recently beheaded five Westerners in televised executions. Asked if he supported the Islamic State, Lindh, now calling himself "Yahya", Arabic for John, replied in a handwritten letter: "Yes, and they are doing a spectacular job. The Islamic State is clearly very sincere and serious about fulfilling the long-neglected religious obligation of establishing a caliphate through armed struggle, which is the only correct method".

In 2017, Foreign Policy magazine reported an internal report by the National Counterterrorism Center asserted Lindh told a visiting television news producer that he had not renounced extremist violence. Lindh was interviewed for the 2016 book The Way of the Strangers: Encounters With the Islamic State by Graeme Wood, on the condition that Wood provide Lindh with "books, treatises, articles, or other writings produced by leaders of the Islamic State and/or scholars affiliated with it (preferably in the original Arabic)". Upon sending, the package of literature was blocked from delivery by the prison as it was deemed contraband; however, Lindh decided to continue corresponding with Wood, although Lindh later ended the correspondence by saying he was personally a "layman" whose opinions had "no consequence", referring to his knowledge of the Islamic State.

== Release ==
On May 23, 2019, Lindh was released early for good behavior from the Terre Haute, Indiana, federal prison prior to the end of his twenty-year sentence, although he accepted several probation requirements due to his continued support of Islamist ideology. These requirements included a ban from Internet use and contact with fellow extremists. The probation lasted for the remaining three years of his sentence. President Donald Trump and Secretary of State Mike Pompeo were among many who criticized the release, but Trump said: "From a legal standpoint, there's nothing we're allowed to do."

In 2021, Lindh was observed by the FBI in several meetings with Ali Shukri Amin, who had recently been released from prison after being convicted in 2015 for conspiracy to provide material support for terrorism for his support for ISIL. This could have constituted a violation of the terms of Lindh's parole, which prohibited communication with other extremists; however, federal prosecutors chose not to pursue it. Despite this, Amin was cited for violation of the terms of his release and sent back to prison.

== In popular culture ==
- In a National Geographic documentary, Taliban Uprising, the only video of Lindh speaking since his capture is shown.
- The documentary Good Morning, Afghanistan by Damien Degueldre features the Battle of Mazar-i-Sharif, where John Walker was being held and later transferred by the Northern Alliance to U.S. Special Forces operatives.
- DJ Krush and Anticon recorded the song "Song for John Walker" for the 2002 album The Message at the Depth.
- The 2003 book My Heart Became Attached by Mark Kukis was a biography of John Walker Lindh, tracing his life from childhood to radicalization to prison.
- A musical interpretation of John Walker Lindh's story was staged in 2004 by Jean Strong and John McCloskey at the New York International Fringe Festival.
- Steve Earle recorded a song about Lindh titled "John Walker's Blues". It was released on his 2002 album Jerusalem.
- The progressive bluegrass band Hot Buttered Rum wrote and recorded "The Trial of John Walker Lindh" for their 2002 album Live at the Freight and Salvage.
- The 13th-season premiere of the police procedural and legal drama television series Law & Order is based on the Lindh case.
- A novel by Pearl Abraham entitled American Taliban (2010) is based on Lindh.
- In episode seven of the first season of the television series Entourage, Vince is offered a role in a fictitious movie based on "the John Walker Lindh story".
- In author Doug Stanton's book Horse Soldiers, Lindh is mentioned as one of the al-Qaeda combatants, then as a prisoner.
- In the popular philosophy collection Dune and Philosophy, American philosophy expert Shane Ralston defends Lindh's character as "quintessentially American" given the idealism, bravery and religious fervor with which he served the Taliban forces in Afghanistan.
- The Spanish writer Enrique Falcón included a poem titled John Walker Lindh in the book Taberna Roja (2008).
- The podcast You're Wrong About featured Lindh in an episode titled "The American Taliban".
- Lindh is initially referred to as "the Irishman" in the 2021 book First Casualty: The Untold Story of the CIA Mission to Avenge 9/11 by Toby Harnden.
- Showtime Networks released a documentary, Detainee 001, about Lindh's capture and interrogations, in September 2021.

== See also ==
- D.C. Five
- Adam Yahiye Gadahn
- Yaser Esam Hamdi
- Bryant Neal Vinas
