= Mark E. Mitchell =

American military person and politician (born 1965)

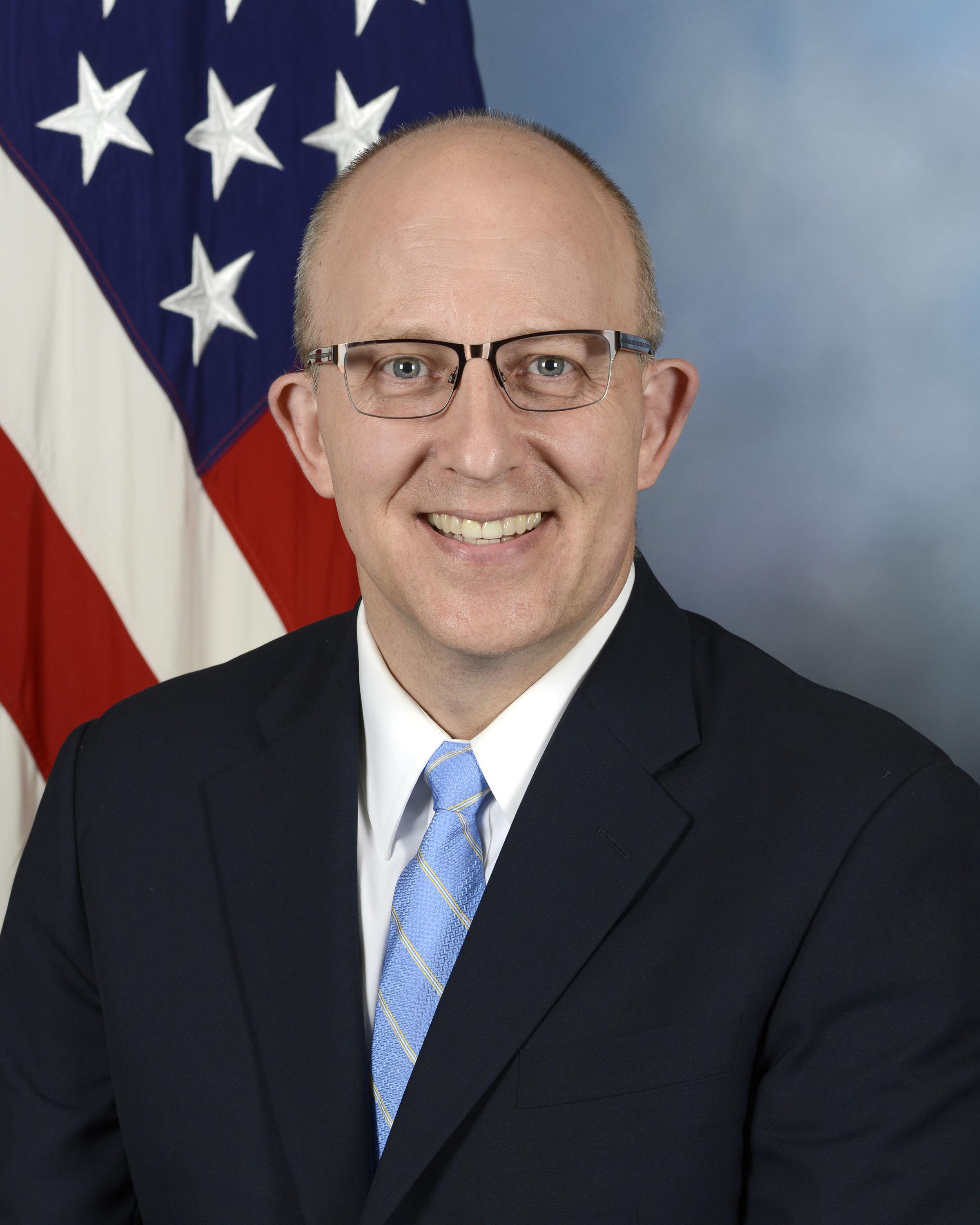

Acting Assistant Secretary of Defense for Special Operations and Low-Intensity Conflict
- In office June 23, 2019 – November 1, 2019
- President: Donald Trump
- Preceded by: Owen West
- Succeeded by: Thomas A. Alexander (Acting)
- In office August 1, 2017 – December 20, 2017
- President: Donald Trump
- Preceded by: Michael D. Lumpkin
- Succeeded by: Owen West

Personal details
- Born: September 15, 1965 (age 60) Milwaukee, Wisconsin, U.S.
- Education: Marquette University (BS); Naval Postgraduate School (MS)

Military service
- Allegiance: United States
- Branch/service: United States Army
- Years of service: 1987–2015
- Rank: Colonel
- Unit: Special Forces
- Commands: 5th Special Forces Group
- Battles/wars: Gulf War; War in Afghanistan; Iraq War
- Awards: Distinguished Service Cross; Defense Superior Service Medal; Legion of Merit; Bronze Star Medal (4)

Mark Edward Mitchell (born September 15, 1965) is a former official in the United States Department of Defense and a retired military officer.

Mitchell served as the acting Assistant Secretary of Defense for Special Operations and Low-Intensity Conflict in 2019. A retired colonel, Mitchell was the first member of the United States Army to be awarded the Distinguished Service Cross during the War in Afghanistan and was the first to receive the award since the Vietnam War. He received the award in 2003 for his actions during the Battle of Qala-i-Jangi, which took place in late November to early December 2001. Mitchell's actions in Afghanistan are reported in Horse Soldiers, a 2009 non-fiction book by Doug Stanton.

== Early life, education and family ==
Mitchell's home of record is Brookfield, Wisconsin. He is an alumnus of Marquette University, having graduated with a Bachelor of Science degree in biomedical engineering in 1987. In 2012, he received Marquette University's Alumni Professional Achievement Award.

In 1999, Mitchell graduated with a Master of Science degree from the Naval Postgraduate School after completing a thesis titled Strategic Leverage: Information Operations and Special Operations Forces. In the 2008–09 academic year, Mitchell attended the Harvard Kennedy School as a National Security Fellow from the United States Army War College.

Mitchell is married, and has two daughters.

== Military career ==
Mitchell began his career assigned to the 24th Infantry Division at Fort Stewart, Georgia. Having served during the Persian Gulf War, Mitchell was with the 5th Special Forces Group at the beginning of the Invasion of Afghanistan. Entering Afghanistan via helicopter, Mitchell and other members of his special forces group began to work with Abdul Rashid Dostum of the Northern Alliance, travelling on horse back. In late November 2001, Mitchell responded to Mazar-e-Sharif and led a fifteen-person special forces team, made up of British and Americans, to stop a prison uprising involving John Walker Lindh at Qala-i-Jangi; for his actions he was awarded the Distinguished Service Cross, and a Navy SEAL was awarded a Navy Cross. Mitchell was later involved in the capture of Mohammad Fazl. In 2003, he deployed to Iraq. Later that year he traveled to MacDill Air Force Base, where he received the Distinguished Service Cross for his actions leading the effort to quell the Taliban's offensive at the Battle of Qala-i-Jangi in 2001. CIA Director George Tenet, the widow of CIA officer Johnny Micheal Spann, and others attended the award ceremony.

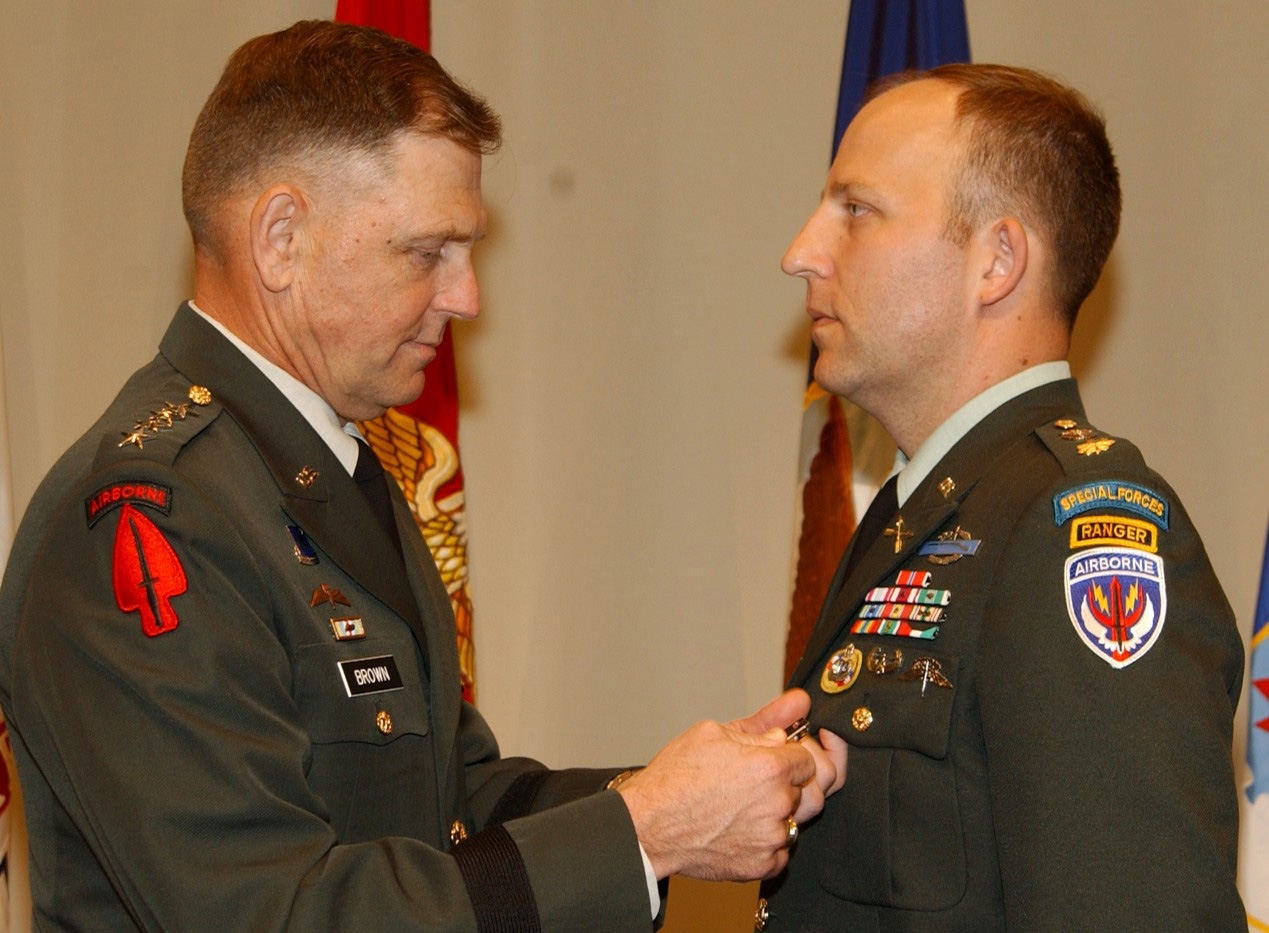
Mitchell receiving his Distinguished Service Cross from General Bryan D. Brown in 2003

From 2003 to 2009, Mitchell deployed to Iraq at least once a year. In 2005, he was promoted to lieutenant colonel. While in Iraq, Mitchell trained and mentored his Iraqi counterparts; however, he says that a year after the United States left Iraq, the capabilities he had taught the Iraqis had been "squandered". By the summer of 2007, Mitchell was the executive officer of 5th Special Forces Group and became its commanding officer at the rank of colonel in August 2009. By 2010, Mitchell was in command of Combined Joint Special Operations Task Force-Arabian Peninsula, with over four thousand American operators, who fought alongside Iraqi Special Operations Forces against the insurgency. At Fort Campbell Mitchell accepted steel from the World Trade Center on behalf of 5th Special Forces Group in 2011, and while in Afghanistan he was part of a mission to bury the steel there. In 2012, Mitchell was assigned to the Office of the Secretary of Defense, specifically working with the Assistant Secretary of Defense for Special Operations/Low Intensity Conflict & Interdependent Capabilities. He was also interviewed on the radio program Someone You Should Know in 2012.

In 2014, Mitchell was a member of the Obama Administration's National Security Council as the director for counterrorism; he held that position until January 2015. While director, he was criticized for threatening families, including Kayla Mueller's, with criminal penalties for attempting to negotiate a ransom for the release of their children. When the Obama Administration relaxed the American policy against ransom payment in exchange for hostages in June 2015, Mitchell criticized the change.

== Awards and decorations ==
Mitchell has received several awards and decorations including the following:

Distinguished Service Cross
Defense Superior Service Medal
Bronze Star Medal with three oak leaf clusters
Defense Meritorious Service Medal

Combat Infantryman Badge (second award)
Expert Infantryman Badge
Master Parachutist Badge
Air Assault Badge
Military Freefall Parachutist Badge
Special Forces Tab
Ranger tab

=== Distinguished Service Cross citation ===
His award citation reads:

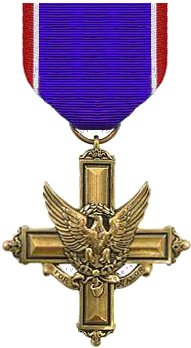

The President of the United States of America, authorized by Act of Congress, July 9, 1918 (amended by act of July 25, 1963), takes pleasure in presenting the Distinguished Service Cross to Major Mark E. Mitchell, United States Army, for extraordinary heroism in action while serving with Headquarters and Headquarters Detachment, 3d Battalion, 5th Special Forces Group (Airborne), during the period of 25 to 28 November 2001. Major Mitchell distinguished himself while engaged in combat operations during Operation Enduring Freedom. As the Ground Force Commander of a rescue operation during the Battle of Qala-I-Jang Fortress, Mazar-e-Sharif, Afghanistan, Major Mitchell ensured the freedom of one American and the posthumous repatriation of another. His unparalleled courage under fire, decisive leadership and personal sacrifice were directly responsible for the success of the rescue operation and were further instrumental in ensuring the city of Mazar-e-Sharif did not fall back in the hands of the Taliban. His personal example has added yet another laurel to the proud military history of this Nation and serves as the standard for all others to emulate. Major Mitchell's gallant deed was truly above and beyond the call of duty and is in keeping with the finest traditions of the military service and reflects great credit upon himself, the 5th Special Forces Group (Airborne), the United States Army, and the United States of America.

== Post military career ==
As of 2016, Mitchell had retired and become a non-resident fellow at the Combating Terrorism Center. He has also written about irregular warfare in the Small Wars Journal.

== Popular media ==
In 2009, Doug Stanton wrote the book Horse Soldiers, a third of which focuses on the actions of Mitchell. 12 Strong, a 2018 movie produced by Jerry Bruckheimer and starring Chris Hemsworth, Michael Shannon and Michael Peña, is based on Horse Soldiers.
