= Battle of the Palm Grove =

2010 battle in the Iraq War

- Part of Operation New Dawn and the Iraq War
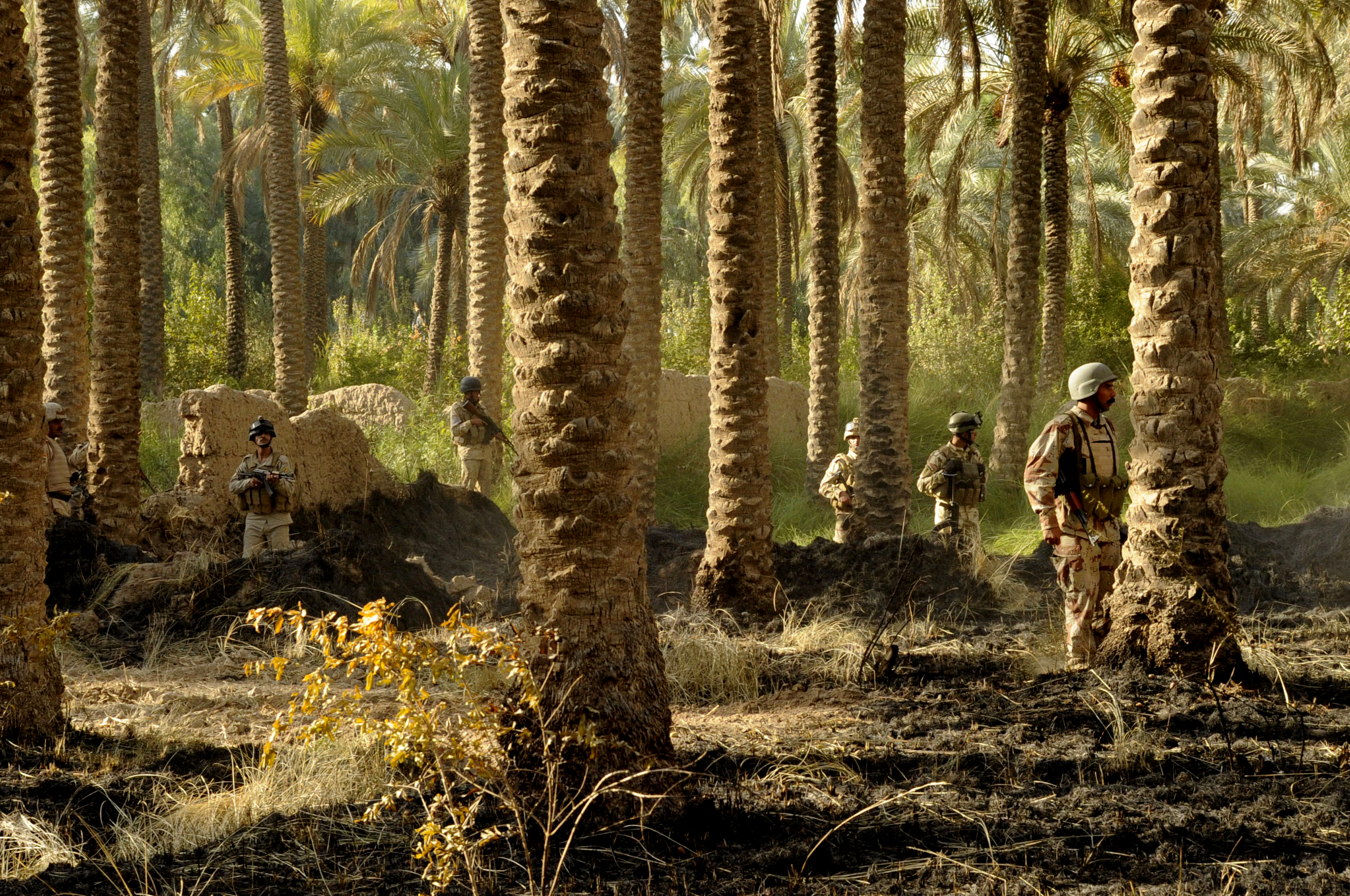
- American and Iraqi soldiers
Date	September 11–13, 2010
Location	Palm grove near al-Hadayd, Diyala Governorate, Iraq 33°46′50.4″N 44°33′18.53″E
Result	Insurgent victory

Belligerents
Iraq; United States	Islamic State of Iraq

Commanders and leaders
(Iraq) Tariq Abdul Wahab Jassim; (United States) Bob Molinari; (United States) Malcolm B. Frost; (United States) Mark E. Mitchell	Unknown

Units involved
Iraq Armed Forces; Iraqi Ground Forces; 19th Brigade; Iraqi Special Operations Forces; 5th Emergency Response Battalion; Iraqi Police; Diyala police; United States Armed Forces; United States Army; 25th Infantry Division; 2nd Advise and Assist Brigade; Combined Joint Special Operations Task Force - Arabian Peninsula; Army Special Forces	Unknown

Strength
(Iraq) ~200 personnel; (United States) 49 personnel	15-25 insurgents

Casualties and losses
(Iraq) 11 killed, 22 wounded; (United States) 2 wounded	Unknown

The Battle of the Palm Grove was a military engagement that took place during the Iraq War when elements of the Second Advise and Assist Brigade (Stryker Brigade Combat Team), 25th ID of the US Army and 512th Military Police Company US Army supported 200 Iraqi Army and Iraqi Police in a search and sweep operation against 15-25 insurgents planting IEDs in Hudaidy, Diyala Province.

During the fighting, Apache attack helicopters and Air Force F-16 fighters were called in. The fighter jets dropped two 500-lb. bombs, but to little effect. After three days of clashes, the insurgent force managed to withdraw without suffering any confirmed casualties, while up to 33 members of the Iraqi security forces were killed or wounded and two U.S. soldiers were injured.

The battle showed the continuing struggle of the Iraqi security forces with their abilities to take control of the security in the country, without the U.S. military. An Iraqi lieutenant later said "If it wasn't for the American air support and artillery we would never have dreamed of entering that orchard". It was also the last major battle of the war involving U.S. forces against insurgent elements.

== Background ==
On August 31, 2010, United States president Barack Obama announced an end to major combat operations in the Iraq War, with Iraqi security forces being set to take charge of the conflict against the insurgency. Six American brigades remained in Iraq under the newly-termed Operation New Dawn, and were tasked with advising Iraqi forces and protecting US civilian interests, although they retained all the firepower of a combat brigade and were authorized to engage in self-defense and come to the support of Iraqi forces.Despite the announcement, American Forces remained involved in combat through the end of the following year, with the last casualty occurring November 14, 2011.

== Prelude ==
Throughout mid-2010, Iraqi security forces reported increased activity by the al-Qaeda-affiliated Islamic State of Iraq (ISI) in the strategic Diyala Governorate. Of particular concern was al-Hadayd, a village 10 kilometers northwest of the provincial capital of Baqubah which security forces believed was being prepared by the ISI to serve as a launching pad for attacks. In response to this threat, and with intelligence on insurgent movements, Iraqi Ground Forces chief Lieutenant General Ali Ghaidan Majid approved the launch of Operation Nakhil, a four-day operation to neutralize ISI bomb-making teams in rural Diyala. It involved some 600 Iraqi personnel searching 21 towns across Diyala.

== Overview ==
The Iraqi army imposed a curfew in al-Hadayd before commencing a search for ISI forces in a nearby palm grove on September 11, 2010. The location was the size of an acre and filled with trenches and palm trees, known for being utilized by insurgents in a similar fashion to hedgerows in the Battle of Normandy. Commanders from seven Iraqi units as well as the minister of defense arrived in the area to oversee the operation.

The 19th Brigade of the Iraqi army ventured into the palm grove before they immediately came under sniper fire and grenade attacks from insurgents dug into trenches. Soldiers were moving in single-file lines, allowing insurgent snipers to pick off their leading officer and cause the rest to panic. The 19th Brigade received reinforcements but were unable to stymie the attacks.

By the evening of September 11, Iraqi forces had withdrew from the battle and requested assistance from the nearby 25th Infantry Division of the US Army. The 2nd Advise and Assist Brigade, a unit of the division previously operating as a Stryker combat brigade before being tasked with an advisory role, was tasked with supporting the Iraqis. Brigade commander Colonel Malcolm B. Frost reported that a total of 49 American personnel were involved, including two Stryker platoons. A special forces contingent of between 10 and 25 soldiers from the Combined Joint Special Operations Task Force - Arabian Peninsula, commanded by Colonel Mark E. Mitchell, was also involved.

The US military joined the battle on the morning of September 12. Upon the arrival of US Army Special Forces and the 5th Emergency Response Battalion of the Iraqi Special Operations Forces, they deliberated with the Iraqi and American commanders in charge and formulated a plan. A US Air Force joint terminal attack controller called in an airstrike on a building used by insurgents, one of two key ISI positions, which was destroyed by two bombs dropped from an F-16 fighter jet.

Colonel Malcolm B. Frost, commander of the 2nd Advise and Assist Brigade in the division, reported that 25 US soldiers and 200 Iraqi soldiers and police officers were involved in close-quarters combat during the battle.

Major Dhalib Attiya of the Diyala Police said the ISI had placed bombs around the perimeter of the grove while snipers fired at soldiers from the palm trees.
