= Fall of Mazar-i-Sharif =

First major offensive in the Afghanistan war following American intervention in 2001

- Part of the War in Afghanistan (2001–2021)
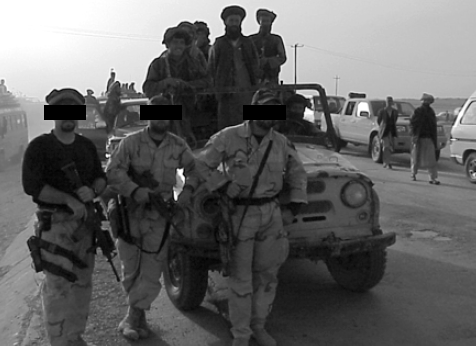
- U.S. Army Special Forces soldiers with Northern Alliance fighters at Mazar-i-Sharif on 10 November 2001
| Date | November 9–10, 2001 (1 day) |
| Location | Mazar-i-Sharif, Balkh Province, Afghanistan 36.7°N 67.1°E |
| Result | Northern Alliance and American victory |

Belligerents
| Northern Alliance; Hezb-e Wahdat; Jamiat-e Islami; (Afghanistan) Junbish-i Milli; United States | Islamic Emirate of Afghanistan; Taliban; Haqqani Network; Allied Jihad Organization: Al-Qaeda; Islamic Movement of Uzbekistan; Tehreek-e-Nafaz-e-Shariat-e-Mohammadi; Turkistan Islamic Party; Other participant: Foreign fighters; Arab fighters |

Commanders and leaders
| (Afghanistan) Atiqullah Baryalai; Abdul Rashid Dostum (Afghanistan) Atta Muhammad Nur; Mohammad Mohaqiq (United States) Tommy Franks | Juma Namangani (KIA); Fazil Mazloom (POW); Nurullah Nuri (POW); Abdul-Razzaq Nafiz (WIA); Abdul-Qahir Usmani (POW); Sufi Muhammad |

Strength
| 2,012+ | 5,000 |

Casualties and losses
| 8 Junbish-i-Milli Islami and 30 Jamiat-e Islami fighters killed | 300 killed, 250 captured |

The fall of Mazar-i-Sharif (or Mazar-e-Sharif) in November 2001 resulted from the first major offensive of the Afghanistan War after American intervention. A push into the city of Mazar-i-Sharif in Balkh Province by the United Islamic Front for the Salvation of Afghanistan (Northern Alliance), combined with U.S. Army Special Forces aerial bombardment, resulted in the withdrawal of Taliban forces who had held the city since 1998. After the fall of outlying villages, and an intensive bombardment, the Taliban and al-Qaeda forces withdrew from the city. Approximately 300 Taliban fighters were killed and 250 were captured, and around 1,000 reportedly defected. The capture of Mazar-i-Sharif was the first major defeat for the Taliban.

== Preparation ==
The Taliban captured Mazar-i-Sharif on 8 August 1998 and controlled it thereafter. After taking the city, Taliban fighters committed a massacre against its Shia population. This led to widespread international condemnation, and further isolation of the Taliban regime.

The campaign to capture Mazar-i-Sharif began on October 17, 2001, when the CIA's eight-member Team Alpha landed in the Dari-a-Suf Valley, about 80 miles south of the city, to link up with General Abdul Rashid Dostum. They were joined three days later by Operational Detachment Alpha (ODA) 595 of the 5th Special Forces Group (United States) of the United States Army. One of the CIA officers involved was Johnny Micheal Spann.

In the days leading up to the battle, Northern Alliance troops advanced on population centers near the city, such as Shol Ghar, which is 25 kilometers from Mazar-i-Sharif. Phonelines into the city were severed, and American officials began reporting accounts of anti-Taliban forces charging Afghan tanks on horseback. On November 2, 2001, Green Berets from ODA 543 and three members of the CIA's Team Bravo inserted into the Dari-a-Balkh Valley, after being delayed by weather for several nights. Their role was to support General Mohammed Atta Nur and his militia. Together they fought through the Dari-e-Souf Valley and had linked up with Dostum and his force and ODA 595 and the CIA Team Alpha, who had also battled through the valley.

Dostum led the ethnic-Uzbek-dominated faction of the Northern Alliance, the Junbish-i-Milli Islami Afghanistan, in an attack on the village of Keshendeh southwest of the city on November 4, seizing it with his horse-mounted troops. General Noor, meanwhile, led 2,000 men of the ethnic-Tajik-dominated Jamiat-e Islami forces against the village of Ag Kupruk directly south of the city, along with six Special Forces soldiers and seven others who directed bombing from behind Taliban lines north of the city. It was seized two days later. Ethnic Hazara forces of Mohammad Mohaqiq's Hezbe Wahdat took part in the offensive.

Propaganda leaflets were dropped from airplanes, showing a woman being struck by a man and asking if this was how the Afghans wanted to live, and listing the radio frequencies over which Americans would be broadcasting their own version of events. Meanwhile, U.S. Special Forces set up laser designators to serve as beacons for guided munitions, highlighting targets around the city.

On November 7, the New York University's Director of Studies on International Cooperation, Barnett Rubin, appeared before a hearing of the American House Committee on International Relations on "The Future of Afghanistan". He claimed that with Mazar-i-Sharif on the brink of invasion, the US was responsible to ensure that there were no reprisal killings of Taliban members by the Northern Alliance. He noted that when the city had been overrun (in 1997 and 1998), thousands had been murdered by both sides.

== Bombing campaign ==
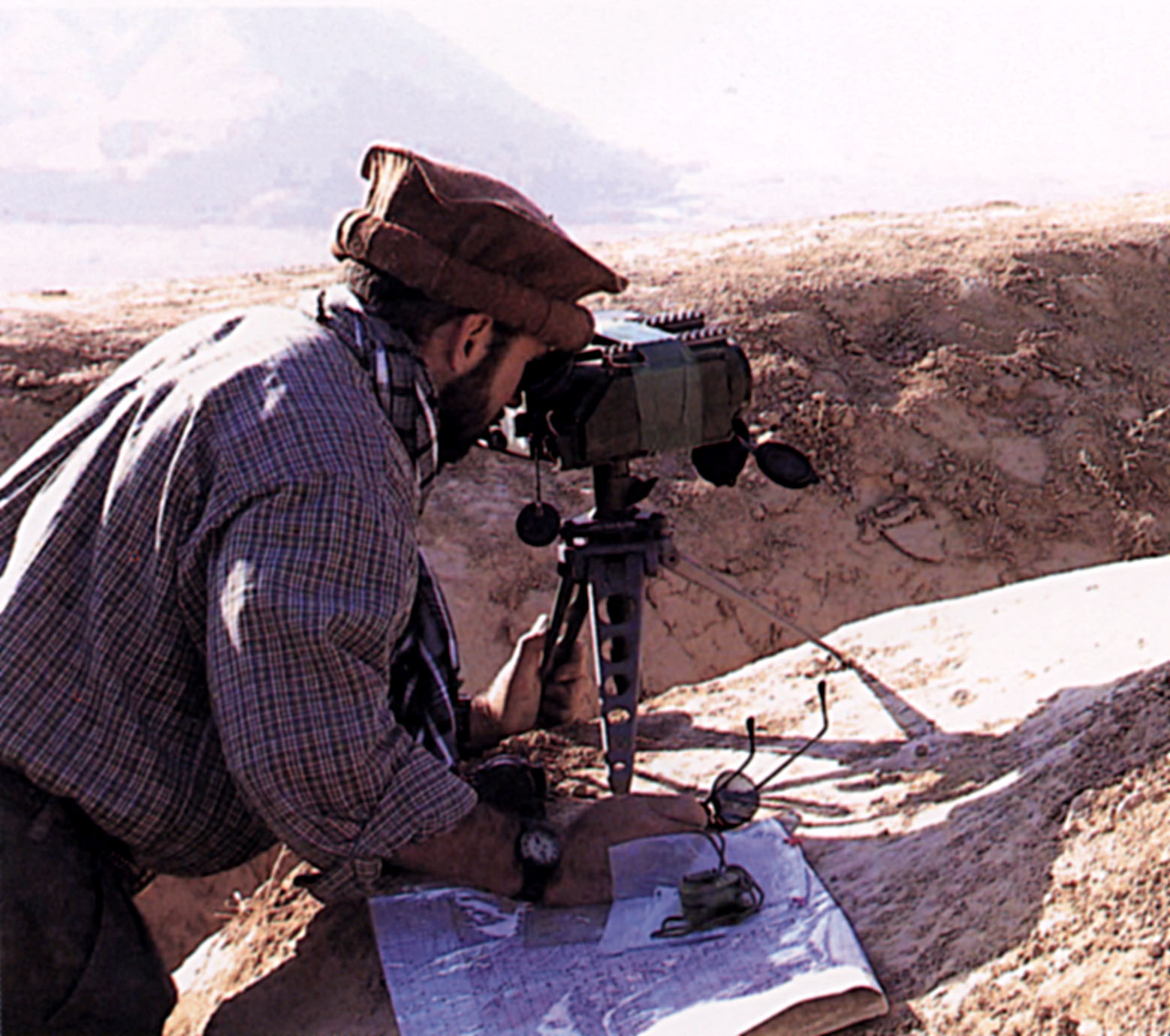
A Special Forces officer uses a SOFLAM to direct aerial bombardments from the ground in 2001

On November 7 and 8, as the Taliban were moving 4,000 fighters across the countryside towards Mazar-i-Sharif in preparation for battle, American B-52 bombers bombed Taliban defenders concentrated in the Cheshmeh-ye Shafa gorge that marked the southern entrance to the city, as well as the Haji Gak pass, which was the only Taliban-controlled entrance to the city. This was one of the heaviest campaigns up to that point. In 2009, former Taliban commander Maulvi Abdul Akhundzada shared a chilling account of the horrors they witnessed during the bombing:

When the bombing started, I was commanding some 400 fighters on the front lines near Mazar-e Sharif. The bombs cut down our men like a reaper harvesting wheat. Bodies were dismembered. Dazed fighters were bleeding from the ears and nose from the bombs' concussions. We couldn't bury the dead. Our reinforcements died in their trenches.

Nevertheless, the Taliban claimed they had infiltrated 500 fighters into the city to prepare for the coming battle.

== Battle ==
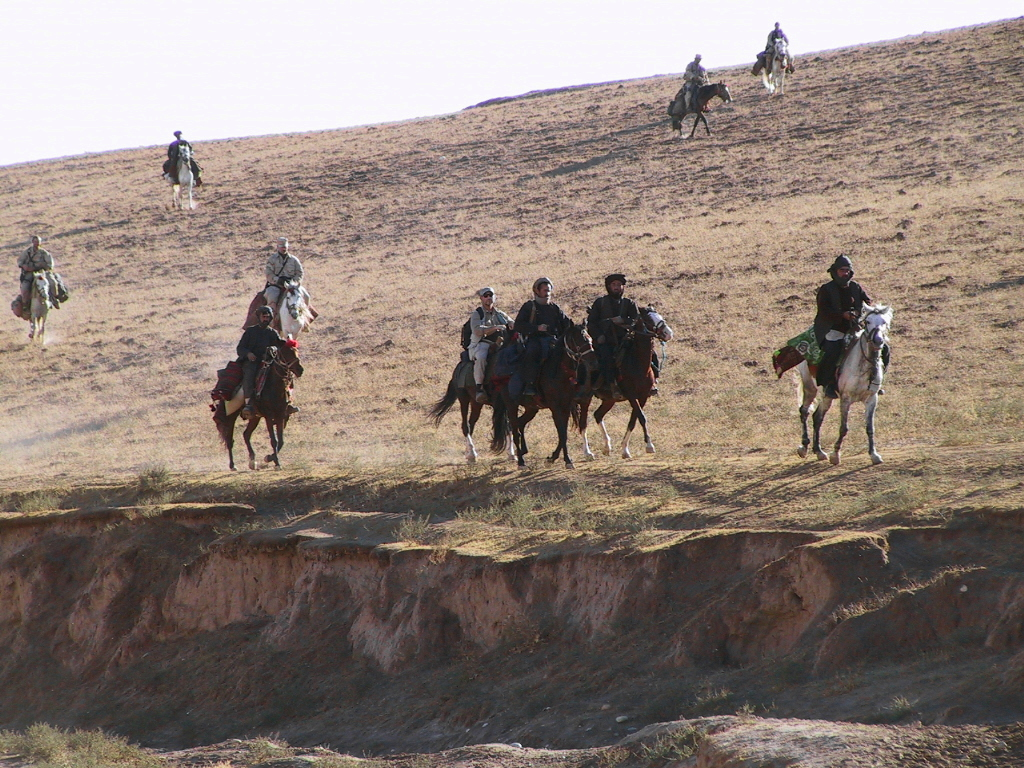
Photo showing U.S. Army Special Forces and U.S. Air Force Combat Controllers in "the first American cavalry charge of the 21st century" with General Dostum and his forces (Taken October 2001)

On November 9, 2001, members of the two ODAs and the CIA teams positioned themselves in mountainside hides and began calling in airstrikes against the Taliban at Tangi Pass - the gateway from the Balkh Valley to the city where the US and Northern Alliance agreed to attack. The Taliban responded with indirect fire from BM-21 Grad rockets, which were quickly suppressed by orbiting air support. The airstrikes took their toll on the Taliban and at a signal Atta and Dostum Northern Alliance forces began their assault by foot, horseback, pickup trucks and some captured BMP armored personnel carriers.

Initial rumors claimed that the fighters holding the city were unimpressed by the American bombardment and believed that their opponents refused to advance on the city. At 2 p.m. Northern Alliance forces, under the command of Dostum and Ustad Atta Mohammed Noor, swept across the Pul-i-Imam Bukhri bridge and seized the city's main military base and the Mazar-e Sharif International Airport. The "ragtag" non-uniformed Northern Alliance forces entered the city from the Balk Valley on "begged, borrowed and confiscated transportation", and met only light resistance.

After outlying villages fell to precision air strikes on key command and control centers, approximately 5,000-12,000 Taliban combatants as well as members of al-Qaeda and other foreign fighters began to withdraw towards Kunduz to regroup, travelling in pickup trucks, SUVs and flatbed trucks fitted with ZU-23-2 anti-aircraft guns modified for ground combat. By sunset, the Taliban forces had retreated to the north and east. Some feared that they were massing for a counter-offensive. It was later estimated that 400–600 people died in the battle, although it was not possible to separate civilian and combatant deaths. Approximately 1,500 Taliban were captured or defected.

=== Pakistani volunteers ===
As many as 900 Pakistani volunteers reached Mazar-i-Sharif in the following days while the majority of the Taliban were evacuating. Many of these fighters were recruited by a Pakistani Mullah, Sufi Mohammed, who used a loudspeaker riveted onto a pickup truck which blared: "Those who die fighting for God don't die! Those who go on jihad live forever, in paradise!"

When these volunteers reached the city in the days when the Taliban were evacuating, many of them were alone and confused. The group, chiefly consisting of teenage boys, gathered in the Sultan Razia Girls' School, where they began negotiating their surrender, but hundreds of them were ultimately killed. For almost two days as the group gathered in the abandoned Sultan Razia Girls' School and built up their fighting positions, the town officials and Northern Alliance attempted negotiations for their surrender, but the fighters vehemently refused, ultimately killing two peace envoys, one town mullah and a soldier escort. All the while they constantly fired at anyone who moved within the vicinity of the building, including civilian bystanders.

After the envoys' murder, the Northern Alliance began returning fire on the school with machine guns. This gun battle went on for hours. Inside the battered school, someone scrawled on the walls the words of their mullah, "Die for Pakistan", "Never surrender" and "Our philosophy has been surrender or die."

At mid-afternoon, U.S. military advisers approved the building for a bombing run. Army Col. Rick Thomas of the U.S. Central Command said they had determined the school was an appropriate target.

Officials from the United Nations and other organizations claimed that a massacre by Northern Alliance troops had followed after the defenders surrendered in the school, moments before an American warplane dropped two or four half-ton bombs. The fighters scattered quickly to escape, and the Northern Alliance shot at them as they fled, resulting in an alleged 800 fatalities. Later reports suggested instead that the Northern Alliance had shelled the school, rather than an American warplane dropping bombs on it, but following the battle, United States Air Force Sgt. Stephen E. Tomat was awarded the Silver Star for calling in the air strike on six vehicles and the school.

== Aftermath ==
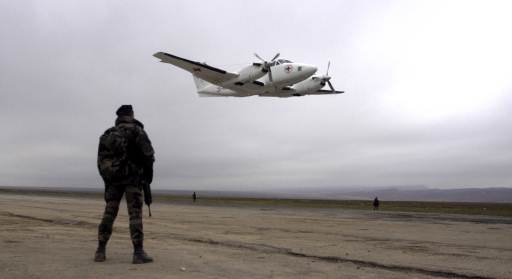
The Airfield was rehabilitated and operational by December 2001

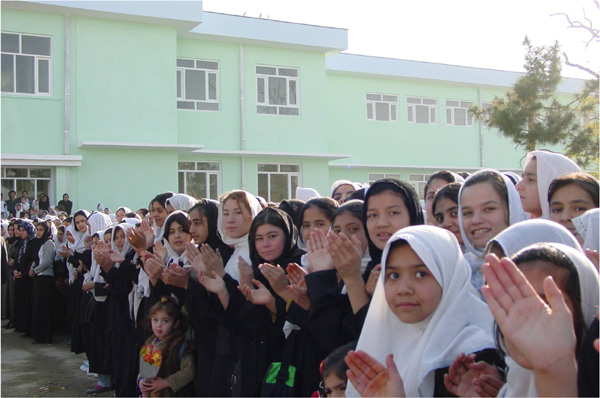
Students at the 2002 reopening of the Sultan Razia school after its destruction

The fall of the city proved to be a "major shock", since the United States Central Command had originally believed that the city would remain in Taliban hands well into the following year and that any battle would be "a very slow advance". Mazar-i-Sharif was strategically important. Its capture opened supply routes and provided an airstrip inside the country for American aircraft. The battle was the Taliban's first major defeat and precipitated a rapid transfer of territory in northern Afghanistan. Following rumors that Mullah Dadullah might be headed to recapture the city with as many as 8,000 Taliban fighters, a thousand U.S. Army Rangers were airlifted into the city, which provided the first solid foothold from which Kabul and Kandahar could be reached.

US Army Civil Affairs Teams from the 96th Civil Affairs Battalion and Tactical Psychological Operations Teams from the 4th Psychological Operations Group assigned to both the Green Berets and Task Force Dagger were immediately deployed to Mazar-e-Sharif to assist in winning the hearts and minds of the inhabitants.

The fall of the city generated reports of jubilant excitement among locals, followed by reports of summary executions and the kidnapping of civilians by the Northern Alliance. The Pakistani prisoners who were captured fleeing the school were held as "slaves" and often sexually abused by their Northern Alliance captors, who demanded a ransom from their families for their return. The American-backed forces now controlling the city immediately began broadcasting from Radio Mazar-e-Sharif, the former Taliban Voice of Sharia channel, on 1584 kHz, including an address from former President Burhanuddin Rabbani. Foreign media outlets were denied access to American troops or to battle sites at this time.

The airfield, the city's main prize for the Americans, had been badly damaged by their bombardment and had been boobytrapped with explosives planted by the Taliban in and around the property as they left. This created a rift between the United Kingdom and the United States. The former charged that the aerial bombardment had been ill-advised, that the United States had failed to pay sufficient attention to humanitarian concerns and had refused to consult with its allies. The destroyed runways were patched by Afghans. The first cargo plane landed ten days after the battle. The airbase was not declared operational until December 11. While prior military flights had had to be launched from Uzbekistan or aircraft carriers in the Arabian Sea, the Americans now could fly more frequent sorties against the Taliban frontlines, carrying heavier payloads that replace the fuel necessary for the longer flights.

The Turkistan Islamic Party's "Islamic Turkistan" magazine in its 4th edition released an obituary of Bilal all Turkistani who was killed in 1422 Hijri in Afghanistan during the fall of the Taliban's Islamic Emirate in Mazar e Sharif's Ganja fortress.

After the battle, the Northern Alliance advanced towards the city of Kunduz, which was the last remaining Taliban stronghold in northern Afghanistan. The siege lasted two weeks with the city being captured on November 25. Around 8,000 Taliban fighters were captured. They were taken to Mazar-i-Sharif and then to Sheberghan Prison in Jowzjan Province. Between 400 and 3,000 prisoners were reportedly massacred by the Northern Alliance during the journey and buried in mass graves in the Dasht-e Leili desert west of Sheberghan.

== In popular culture ==
The fall of Mazar-i-Sharif and the events surrounding it were dramatized in the 2018 film 12 Strong, directed by Nicolai Fuglsig and based on the book Horse Soldiers by Doug Stanton.
