= Abdul Jabar (Qala-i-Jangi captive) =

- Born: 1975 (age 50–51); Tashkent, Uzbekistan
- Detained at: Qali-i-Jangi Prison

Abdul Jabar (born 1975) was a captive who survived the Qala-i-Jangi prison riot. An article published in the New York Times described Abdul Jabar as a 26-year-old citizen of Uzbekistan, from Tashkent.

Abdul Jabar told the New York Times that he had been in Afghanistan's north for approximately a year prior to al Qaeda's attacks on America on September 11, 2001. He said he had been working in Kabul working with the Islamic Movement of Uzbekistan—part of a group of 150 Uzbeks.

Jabar added that the uprising was a reaction to the Afghan Northern Alliance not honoring assurances it had made that foreigners who surrendered their weapons without resistance would be set free. He said the leader of his group, Juma Namangani, had led the uprising:

Our commander began it. He said, "It is better to die a martyr than be in prison." Our commander said we should fight to the last drop of blood.

The Guardian reported that Namangani had been killed in combat prior to the group's surrender.

Jabar estimated that there had been approximately 400 prisoners prior to the uprising. Only 85 captives survived. Jabar described hiding from Northern Alliance bombardment in ditches and trenches, and then crawling from the prison's courtyard to the basement. Authorities tried bombarding the building with cannon fire, with rocket fire. On November 29, 2001, authorities tried flooding the basement with burning fuel. He told the New York Times:

The smoke was so bad, you could not breathe.

On December 1, 2001, Northern Alliance Commander Din Muhammad diverted irrigation canals to flood the basement:

We gave up because there was nothing left, we had no ammunition, no weapons, no food. And then they started filling up the basement with water. The water came up to our waists. Our commander decided we should surrender, but we all decided we should surrender.

The New York Times reported that survivors of the riot were loaded into industrial shipping containers, in order to be transported to a more secure facility.

It also stated that Abdul Jabar feared for his life if he were repatriated to Uzbekistan:

Only God knows what will happen, but if they send us back to Uzbekistan that will be the end.

The Guardian reported that Jabar denounced al Qaeda's attacks on 9-11, and said the fighters had no grudge with the USA:

We are not against Americans. I studied at university. I studied the Koran. I believe we should live by Islam and that the only real Islamic state is Afghanistan.

He was interrogated by Luke Harding, whom he told that "It was our commander who began the fighting", presumed to be a reference to Tahir Uldosh, who was believed to be killed in the uprising.

There is no record that Abdul Jabar was sent to the Guantanamo Bay detention camps, in Cuba.
