= Malcolm B. Frost =

United States Army major general (born 1966)

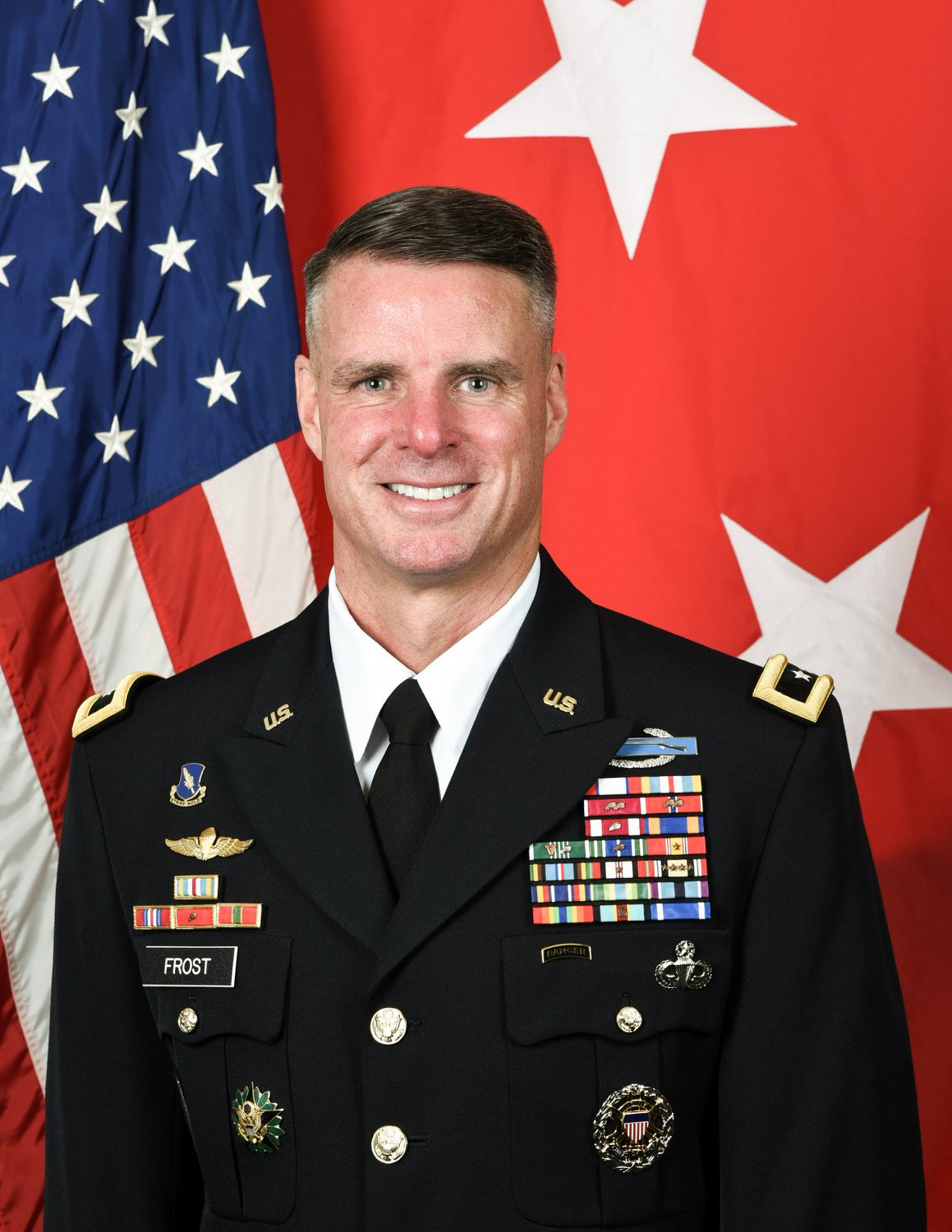
- Commanding General, U.S. Army CIMT
- Allegiance: United States of America
- Branch: United States Army
- Service years: 1988–Present
- Rank: Major General
- Commands: 2nd Stryker Brigade Combat Team, 25th Infantry Division; 2nd Battalion, 5th Infantry Regiment, later 3rd Squadron, 4th U.S. Cavalry Regiment 25th Infantry Division
- Conflicts: Operation Joint Endeavor; Global War on Terrorism: Operation Enduring Freedom; War in Afghanistan; Iraq War: Operation Iraqi Freedom; Operation New Dawn
- Awards: Army Distinguished Service Medal; Defense Superior Service Medal; Legion of Merit (3); Bronze Star Medal (3); Meritorious Service Medal (6); Air Medal; Army Commendation Medal (6 incl 1 for Valor)

Malcolm Bradley Frost (born July 28, 1966) is a retired United States Army major general who last served as Commanding General, Center for Initial Military Training, United States Army, Training and Doctrine Command, Fort Eustis, VA. MG Frost most recently served as Chief of Public Affairs for the U.S. Army at the Pentagon in Washington, DC. Frost's previous assignment was Deputy Commanding General of the 82nd Airborne Division at Ft. Bragg, NC from March 2014 to March 2015. In March 2014, Frost completed his assignment as deputy director for Operations at the National Military Command Center, J3 the Joint Staff at the Pentagon. Prior to that, he completed an assignment as the Deputy Chief of Staff for Operations (G3/5/7) for the United States Army Pacific (USARPAC). and commanded the 2nd Stryker Brigade Combat Team, 25th Infantry Division.

== Early life and education ==
Frost graduated from the U.S. Military Academy at West Point, New York, in May 1988.

Frost is a graduate of the Infantry Officer Basic and Advanced Courses, the Command and General Staff College, and the U.S. Army War College. He holds master's degrees in Human Resources Development from Webster University and Strategic Studies from the U.S. Army War College.

== Career ==
In 1990, Frost was assigned with the 1st Battalion (Mechanized), 8th Infantry Regiment, 4th Infantry Division at Fort Carson, Colorado where he served as a Rifle and Support Platoon Leader and Company Executive Officer.

=== Italy and Bosnia ===
In 1993, Frost served with the 3rd Airborne Battalion Combat Team (ABCT), 325th Infantry in Vicenza, Italy where he served as the Battalion Logistics and Air Operations Officer and C Company Commander. His command tour included deployment to Bosnia-Hercegovina (former Yugoslavia) in support of Operation Joint Endeavor. On 18 December 1995, the company he commanded deployed from Aviano Air Base, Italy to Tuzla Air Base, Bosnia as the lead element from 3-325 ABCT, the first U.S. unit to deploy to Bosnia after the signing of the Dayton Peace Accords. C Company was responsible for security on the north side of Tuzla Air Base, including the Main Gate Entrance point. On 20 December 1995 his unit officially relieved elements of the United Nations Protection Force (UNPROFOR) as part of the Bosnia-wide transfer of authority from UNPROFOR to the NATO-led Implementation Force (IFOR).

=== The Old Guard and the Aide-de-Camp to the Army Chief of Staff ===
In 1996, Frost was assigned to Fort Myer, Virginia where he commanded C Company, 1st Battalion, 3rd U.S. Infantry Regiment, also known as "The Old Guard".

In 1998, Frost was assigned as the Aide-de-Camp to the Chief of Staff of the Army, General Dennis J. Reimer at the Pentagon.

=== 82nd Airborne Division and the War in Afghanistan ===
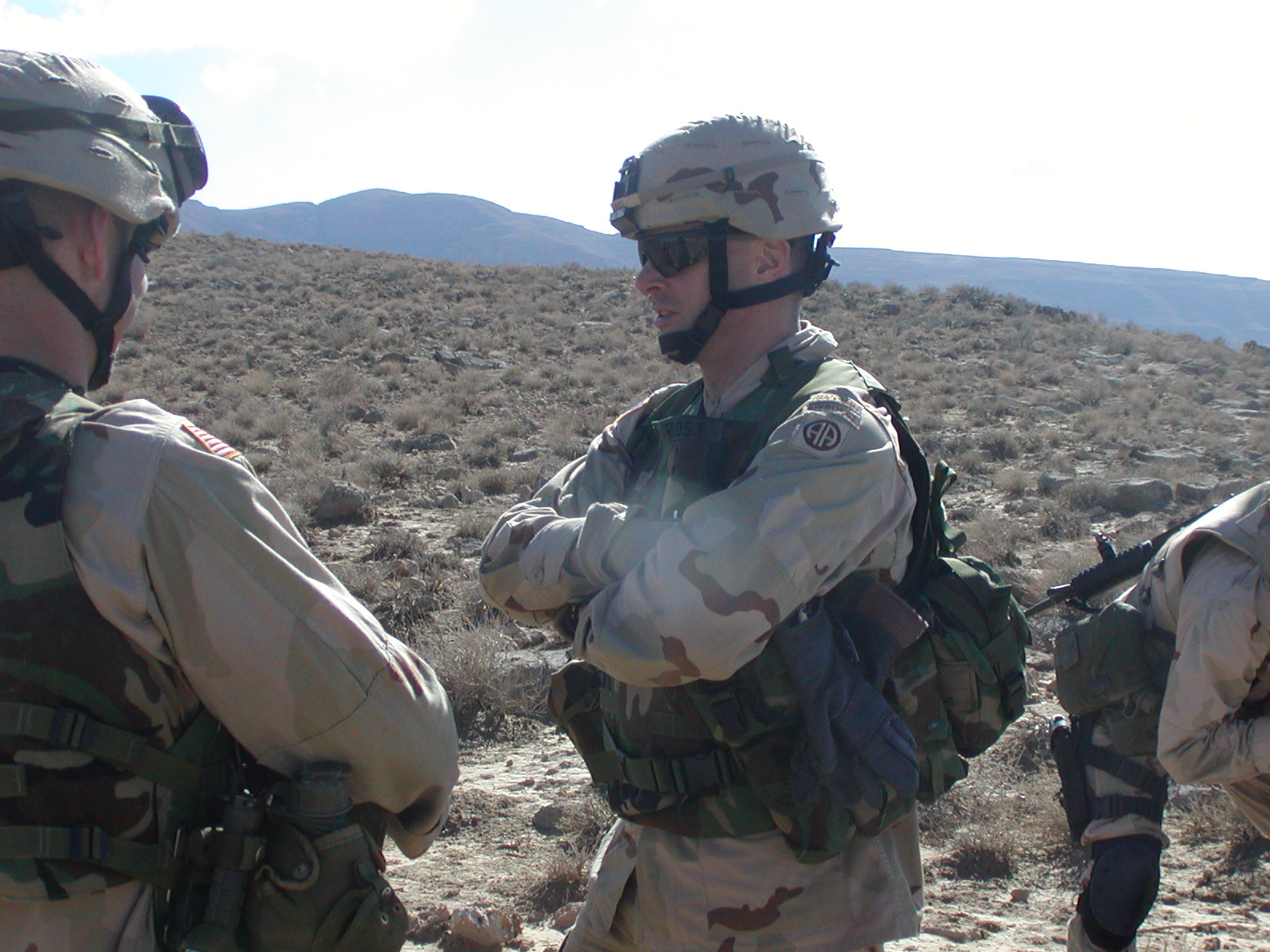
Frost in Kandahar Province, Afghanistan, in January 2003, during Operation Mongoose.

In 2000, Frost was assigned to the 82nd Airborne Division at Fort Bragg, North Carolina where he served as the Division Training Officer and Operations Officer for both the 3rd Battalion, 504th Parachute Infantry Regiment (PIR) and 1st Brigade (504th PIR). His tour as Brigade Operations Officer was highlighted by 1st Brigade's deployment to Afghanistan in 2002–2003 in support of Operation Enduring Freedom. From December 2002 to May 2003, the brigade was the U.S. Army's sole combat brigade in Afghanistan. It conducted over a dozen Brigade Air Assault operations, numerous Ground Assault Convoy operations, and several Air Drop and Civil Military operations. Under the theatre level Combined Joint Task Force 180 and the subordinate Combined Task Force 82, the brigade operated with numerous coalition and special operations partners against al-Qaeda and the Taliban.

=== Hawaii and the Iraq War ===
From 2004 to 2005, Frost served as the G3 and later Chief of Staff for the 25th ID (Light) Rear and U.S. Army Hawaii. In 2003, Frost was assigned to the 25th Infantry Division (Light) at Schofield Barracks, Hawaii where he served as the Chief of Exercises. Frost commanded the 2nd Battalion, 5th Infantry Regiment and later the 3rd Squadron, 4th US Cavalry Regiment, 25th ID from 2005–2008 to include 3-4 Cavalry's deployment to Iraq in 2006–2007 in support of Operation Iraqi Freedom. While deployed for 15 months during the Surge (Iraq War troop surge of 2007) in Iraq, 3-4 Cavalry was responsible for operations in Western Nineveh Province in the north of Iraq.

After the squadron returned from Iraq, Frost concluded his service in Hawaii with a six-month tour as the Chief of the Training and Exercise Division for the U.S. Army Pacific (USARPAC) at Fort Shafter, Hawaii.

After attending the U.S. Army War College, Frost returned to Hawaii and commanded the 2nd Stryker Brigade Combat Team, 25th ID at Schofield Barracks from 2009 to 2011. It included the brigade's deployment to Iraq in 2010-2011 where it served in Diyala and Salah ad Din Provinces as an Advise and Assist Brigade (AAB) in support of Operation Iraqi Freedom and later Operation New Dawn.

=== USARPAC ===
In September 2011, subsequent to his tour as a brigade commander, Frost served for nearly a year as the Deputy Chief of Staff for Operations (G3/5/7/9) for United States Army Pacific (USARPAC) at Fort Shafter, Hawaii.

=== National Military Command Center ===
Frost served as deputy director for Operations at the National Military Command Center, J3 the Joint Staff in the Pentagon in 2013–2014.

=== 82nd Airborne Division ===
In March 2014, Frost became Deputy Commanding General (Support) for the 82nd Airborne Division, missioned as the Army's Global Response Force, at Ft. Bragg, NC.

=== Chief of Public Affairs, U.S. Army ===
In May 2015, Frost was assigned as the U.S. Army's Chief of Public Affairs, responsible for strategic communication, media relations, community relations, and public affairs proponency for the Army's military and civilian public affairs professionals.

=== CG, Center for Initial Military Training ===
In July 2017, Frost was assigned as the Commanding General for the U.S. Army Center for Initial Military Training (CIMT) at Fort Eustis, VA. CIMT is responsible transforming civilian volunteers into Soldiers who are disciplined, fit, combat ready, grounded in Army values, and who increase readiness at their first unit of assignment. CIMT is also the Army's proponent for leading a generational shift in physical and non-physical fitness training through the development of the U.S. Army's Holistic Health and Fitness System.

== Awards and decorations ==
U.S. military decorations
Army Distinguished Service Medal (2 awards)
Defense Superior Service Medal
Legion of Merit (3 awards)
Bronze Star (3 awards)
Meritorious Service Medal (6 awards)
Air Medal
Army Commendation Medal (6 awards incl 1 for Valor)
Army Achievement Medal (2 awards)
U.S. Unit Awards
Valorous Unit Award
Meritorious Unit Commendation (2 awards)
Superior Unit Award
Other U.S. Government awards
Dept. of State Meritorious Honor Award
U.S. Service (Campaign) Medals and Service and Training Ribbons
National Defense Service Medal (with 1 Service Star)
Armed Forces Expeditionary Medal
Afghanistan Campaign Medal (with 1 Service Star)
Iraq Campaign Medal (with 4 Service Stars)
Global War on Terrorism Service Medal
Humanitarian Service Medal
Armed Forces Service Medal
Army Service Ribbon
Army Overseas Service Ribbon (with award numeral "5")
Foreign Medals and Ribbons
NATO Medal (for Bosnia-Herzegovina)

Other accoutrements
Combat Infantryman Badge
Expert Infantryman Badge
Ranger Tab
Master Parachutist Badge
Army Staff Identification Badge
Office of the Joint Chiefs of Staff Identification Badge
82 Airborne Division (United States) worn as his Combat Service Identification Badge
504th Parachute Infantry Regiment worn as his Distinctive Unit Insignia
6 Overseas Service Bars, reflecting more than 3 years overseas combat service
Foreign Awards
Republic of Indonesia, Basic Paratrooper Jump Wings
