= Cheshmeh-ye Shafa =

- Location in Afghanistan
- Coordinates: 36°32′0″N 66°58′0″E
- Country: Afghanistan
- Province: Balkh Province
- Time zone: + 4.30

Cheshmeh-ye Shafa or Cheshm-e-Shafa (English: "the gorge of the healing spring") is a village in Balkh Province in northern Afghanistan.

In October 2008, the French Archaeological Delegation in Afghanistan (DAFA) believed they have found a vast ancient city of Bactria. It is believed that the site could be where Alexander the Great married Bactrian princess Roxana.

It is located 30 km south of Balkh.

Tangi Cheshmeh Shafa is Afghanistan's largest Achaemenid site discovered to date. It spans about 3 km square. The site dates back to 500-600 BC. In the oasis, a huge white rock, shaped like an anvil, is evidence of Zoroastrian priests that performed rituals for people who lived in the region around 600 BC. On the altar's flat top is a well for oil.

== See also ==
- Balkh Province
