= Toby Harnden =

Anglo-American author & journalist (born 1966)

Toby Harnden (born 14 January 1966) is a British-American author and journalist.

Harnden spent almost 25 years working for British newspapers, mainly as a foreign correspondent. From 2013 until 2018, he was Washington bureau chief of The Sunday Times. He previously spent 17 years at The Daily Telegraph, based in London, Belfast, Washington, Jerusalem and Baghdad, finishing as U.S. Editor from 2006 to 2011. He was reporter and presenter of the BBC Panorama special programme Broken by Battle about suicide and PTSD among British soldiers, broadcast in 2013.

Harnden is the author of Bandit Country: The IRA & South Armagh (1999), Dead Men Risen: The Welsh Guards and the Defining Story of Britain's War in Afghanistan (2011) and First Casualty: The Untold Story of the CIA Mission to Avenge 9/11 (2021). Dead Men Risen was awarded the Orwell Prize for books in 2012.

== Background ==
The son of architect Keith Anthony Harnden and Valerie Anne Steadman Harnden (nee Dixon), he was born in Portsmouth and grew up in Marple and Rusholme, Manchester. He attended Harrytown Comprehensive School in Bredbury, Cheshire and St Bede's College, Manchester. He entered Britannia Royal Naval College, Dartmouth in January 1985 and passed out the following August. After studying Modern History at Corpus Christi College, Oxford, he graduated from Oxford University with a First in July 1988, receiving a College Prize and the Miles Clauson Prize. While at Oxford, Harnden was Junior Common Room President of Corpus Christi in 1987, succeeding David Miliband and was president of the JCR Presidents' Committee.

Before becoming a journalist, Harnden was an officer in the Royal Navy, retiring in the rank of Lieutenant in 1994 after service ashore and at sea in the assault ships HMS Fearless, and HMS Intrepid, the minesweeper HMS Itchen, the destroyers HMS Manchester and HMS Edinburgh and the frigate HMS Cornwall. During his training, he was an exchange officer with the Royal Norwegian Navy, helping to transport reindeer on troop landing craft. His final naval appointment was in the Ministry of Defence as Flag Lieutenant to the Second Sea Lord.

In August 2009, Harnden became an American citizen. He has two children.

== Books ==
Harnden has written three non-fiction books: Bandit Country: The IRA & South Armagh (1999), Dead Men Risen: The Welsh Guards and the Defining Story of Britain's War in Afghanistan (2011) and First Casualty: The Untold Story of the CIA Mission to Avenge 9/11 (2021).

Bandit Country: The IRA & South Armagh was published by Hodder & Stoughton in 1999. It led to the formation of the Smithwick Tribunal, which investigated whether, as Harnden had alleged in his book, there had been Garda (Irish police) collusion in the 1989 murders of two senior RUC officers, Chief Superintendent Harry Breen and Superintendent Bob Buchanan. In December 2013, the tribunal confirmed the allegations, concluding that there had been Garda collusion in the murders. The Irish government apologized to the families of the dead officers. Ed Moloney, one of the foremost experts on the modern IRA, supported Harnden's account:

The other thing I know is that the IRA did have an agent inside the Dundalk Garda station. The Smithwick Tribunal was established largely because of allegations from Toby Harnden in his book Bandit Country – The IRA and South Armagh that a Dundalk-based Garda helped the IRA kill the two RUC men. Harnden got his information from security force sources on both sides of the Border and although he refused to give evidence to Smithwick – presumably on the laudable grounds that he would not compromise his sources – I believed him. I believed him not just because I know him to be a reputable and ethical journalist but also because I was told the same, that a well-known Dundalk Garda was in the back pocket of the IRA in South Armagh. My source was a well-placed member of the IRA whose position in the organization was such that he was in a position to know all about the Garda agent. The details about the agent that I was given dovetail exactly with Harnden's information.

In 2019, novelist David Keenan named Bandit Country as one of the top 10 books written about the Troubles, stating: "One of my fascinations with Northern Ireland in the 1970s and 80s is how it became a place where different rules applied, where reality itself seemed up for grabs. Nowhere was this more the case than the 'Provisional Republic' of South Armagh, AKA Bandit Country, with its handmade 'sniper at work' signs and its community militias all surveyed by the watchtowers and helicopters of the British army. Toby Harnden's book is a compulsively fascinating tour of this alternative universe." In 2002, BBC journalist and author Peter Taylor, a veteran of more than three decades of reporting in Ireland, listed Bandit Country in his top 10 books on the Troubles, concluding: "Courageous journalism and compulsive reading as Harnden goes inside the most impenetrable and deadly of the IRA Brigades. Good judgment; great sources." In 2003, it was reported that the British authorities had tried to use possession of a copy of Bandit Country as evidence against an alleged Irish republican dissident accused of terrorist offenses: "An attempt was also made to lodge the possession of Toby Handen's 'Bandit Country' as evidence against one of the accused." After falling out of print, the book was reissued with a new foreword in 2024.

Dead Men Risen was published by Quercus Books in March 2011. Publication was delayed after the Ministry of Defence objected to certain passages on "security" grounds. The book had already been cleared for publication by the MOD after a four-month review process that Harnden had agreed to as part of a contract that provided him with access to the Welsh Guards. Following a legal dispute between the MOD and Quercus, the MOD agreed to purchase all 24,000 copies of the first print run of the book, at a cost to the UK taxpayer of £151,450, and oversee their pulping. It was well-reviewed and reached number four on The Sunday Times bestseller list. In May 2012, it was awarded the Orwell Prize for books. Orwell prize judges Helena Kennedy, Miranda Carter and Sameer Rahim said: "It sometimes seems that we only care about the soldiers fighting in our names when they are killed. Once the platitudes are over we forget about them. Toby Harnden's remarkable book takes us into the hearts and minds of the Welsh Guards in a way that is both compelling and visceral. It challenges every citizen of this country to examine exactly what we're asking soldiers to do in Afghanistan."

First Casualty: The Untold Story of the CIA Mission to Avenge 9/11 was published by Little, Brown in September 2021. The book's title is a reference to paramilitary officer Johnny Micheal Spann, a member of the CIA's Team Alpha, whose eight members became the first Americans behind enemy lines in Afghanistan following the 9/11 attacks of 2001.

== Journalism career ==
Harnden spent 24 years with British newspapers, 19 of them as a foreign correspondent based in Washington D.C., the Middle East and London. He has interviewed three U.S. presidents: George W. Bush (in 2000 and 2014), Bill Clinton (in 2006) and Jimmy Carter (in 2015).

He started his career in journalism as a theatre reviewer at the Edinburgh Fringe Festival for The Scotsman and a writer of obituaries for The Independent. He began at The Daily Telegraph in 1994 as a home news reporter. He was posted to Belfast as the newspaper's Ireland Correspondent in March 1996, shortly after the IRA's first ceasefire had ended. He subsequently covered the IRA's second ceasefire, the Good Friday Agreement and the Omagh bombing of 1998. Harnden was ordered by Lord Saville's Bloody Sunday Tribunal to hand over recordings and notes of his interviews with two anonymous Paratroopers who had been present during the 1972 killings. He refused to do so, arguing that it was his duty to protect the anonymity of his sources. According to The Irish Times: "With contempt of court proceedings hanging over him, Mr. Harnden faced a heavy fine or up to two years' imprisonment." In June 2004, Saville dropped contempt proceedings with Harnden stating that he would never have revealed the identity of "Soldier X", who had opened fire on Bloody Sunday.

From 1999 to 2003, Harnden was Washington Bureau Chief of The Daily Telegraph. He reported from Washington during the 9/11 terrorist attacks in 2001. Six months after 9/11, he spoke of his growing affinity with the United States, saying at a Brookings Institution forum: "There's a great difference at the moment between the language that's used in America and in Europe...Since September 11, I feel like I'm more like an American than a European...I find myself more and more having a problem with people in Europe. At least what you get here is people saying what they mean, which is what I find refreshing." He became Middle East Correspondent of The Daily Telegraph in October 2003 and was based in Jerusalem and then Baghdad. Harnden spent much of 2004 and 2005 covering the war in Iraq. In November 2004, he was embedded with the US Army's Task Force 2-2 during the battle of Fallujah, including Staff Sergeant David Bellavia, later awarded the Medal of Honor. Of Bellavia's platoon, Harnden reported: "With Dope's 'Die Motherfucker Die' blaring out from the psychological operations Humvee, the Terminators entered Fallujah to go about their business in the way they know best. They played 'Rage Against the Machine' in the backs of their Bradleys and enjoyed the buzz of killing. When it was over, they sat laughing about the insurgents who had jumped out of closets to fight them or wrapped themselves in curtains to hide. They joked about the cat they'd seen eating the face of a corpse, about the fighter who had been 'fragged' by a grenade and shot several times but who still managed to jump off a roof and escape. They celebrated victory but most of all they were intoxicated by being alive."

Harnden joined The Sunday Telegraph in 2005 as London-based Chief Foreign Correspondent, traveling to report from Iraq, Afghanistan, Israel, the Occupied Palestinian Territories, Lebanon, Bahrain, Zimbabwe, Mozambique, Austria, Italy, Estonia, Saudi Arabia, Pakistan, the United States and Thailand. In May 2005, Harnden was imprisoned in Zimbabwe for 14 days after being arrested at a rural polling station on the day of the country's parliamentary elections and deported following acquittal on charges of illegally entering the country and "practicing journalism without accreditation". During court appearances, Harnden and photographer Julian Simmonds were shackled together with handcuffs and leg irons.

Harnden returned to Washington DC in May 2006 as a correspondent for The Sunday Telegraph and in October 2006 became United States Editor of The Daily Telegraph. He covered the 2008 primaries and general election, traveling extensively as part of the Obama campaign press corps.

He was shortlisted for the UK's Press Gazette for Digital Journalist of the Year 2008. In 2011, he was ranked at 27 in a list of Top 50 most influential media users of Twitter in the UK. He left the Telegraph at the end of 2011 to join the Daily Mail. In January 2013, he joined The Sunday Times as Washington Bureau Chief and spent almost six years as the newspaper's senior American correspondent, covering the Boston bombings, unrest in Ferguson, Missouri, the 2016 presidential election, and the 2017 mass shooting in Las Vegas.

On 3 August 2021, two weeks before the collapse of Afghan forces and the return of the Taliban government, Harnden argued in a Wall Street Journal opinion article that the U.S. had succeeded in Afghanistan in 2001 because the CIA-led campaign had only used small number of American intelligence agents and Special Forces, combined with U.S. air power, and had left the bulk of the fighting to indigenous Afghan forces. He warned against a complete U.S withdrawal and stated that a U.S. approach based on similar principles could still succeed in 2021: "A small residual force of CIA officers and special forces, using U.S. air power when needed, while letting the Afghans fight would prevent a Taliban rout. Such an approach could prevent Afghanistan returning to what it was before 9/11—an ungoverned space where terrorists can plot with impunity." In September 2021, Harnden wrote in a Guest Essay in The New York Times that the Taliban had not changed fundamentally and that it was foolish to assume so: "The Taliban seem to have calculated that the West's wishful thinking and desire to move on from two decades of bloody conflict would be enough to win them global acceptance." Harnden was involved in evacuating his translator Rohullah Sadat from Afghanistan.

== Main works ==
- First Casualty: The Untold Story of the CIA Mission to Avenge 9/11, Little, Brown, New York, 2021. ISBN 978-1-84916-421-4
- Dead Men Risen: The Welsh Guards and the Real Story of Britain's War in Afghanistan, Quercus, London, 2011. ISBN 978-1-84916-421-4
- Bandit Country -The IRA and South Armagh, Hodder & Stoughton, London, 1999. ISBN 0-340-71736-X
  - Bandit Country -The IRA and South Armagh (Rev. ed.), Biteback Publishing, 2024. ISBN 9781785908415
