= Johnny Micheal Spann =

Central Intelligence Agency officer

- Born: March 1, 1969; Winfield, Alabama, U.S.
- Died: November 25, 2001 (aged 32); Qala-i-Jangi, Balkh Province, Afghanistan
- Burial place: Arlington National Cemetery
- Alma mater: Auburn University
- Spouses: Kathryn Ann Webb (m. 1990; div. 2000) Shannon Joy (m. 2000)
- Children: 3
- Military career
- Allegiance: United States
- Branch: United States Marine Corps
- Service years: 1991–1999
- Rank: Captain
- Unit: Special Activities Division
- Conflicts: War in Afghanistan: Battle of Qala-i-Jangi †
- Awards: Intelligence Star; Exceptional Service Medallion
- Other work: Central Intelligence Agency (1999–2001)

Johnny Micheal "Mike" Spann (March 1, 1969 – November 25, 2001) was an American paramilitary officer in the Central Intelligence Agency's Special Activities Division. Spann was the first American killed in combat during the United States invasion of Afghanistan in 2001. He died at the Qala-i-Jangi fortress during an al-Qaeda prisoner uprising.

== Early life ==
Johnny Micheal Spann was from the small town of Winfield, Alabama, the son of real estate agent Johnny Spann and his wife Gail. His name was spelled "Micheal" because of his mother's Irish ancestry. Spann graduated in 1987 from Winfield City High School, where he played football. At 17, he earned his private pilot license and later became a certified rescue diver and parachutist.

== Military service ==
In December 1991, while attending Auburn University, he joined the Marine Corps Reserve. After graduating from Auburn with a Bachelor of Science degree in Criminal Justice/Law Enforcement in 1992, Spann attended the Marines' Officer Candidates School at Quantico, Virginia. He had originally wanted to go into aviation, but became a field artillery officer and eventually served with the 2nd Air Naval Gunfire Liaison Company. He specialized in close air support. In 1997, he was second-in-command for UNITAS, a joint exercise expedition in Latin America and Africa. He served six years with the United States Marine Corps and was stationed in Okinawa, Japan and at Camp Lejeune, North Carolina, eventually achieving the rank of Captain.

== CIA service ==
Spann joined the CIA in June 1999 and trained at The Farm, where he met his future wife Shannon Verleur (née Joy) and was known as "Silent Mike". On completion of training, he was assigned to Ground Branch of the CIA's Special Activities Division. In early 2001, he was on a training course with a fellow former Marine called Brian (who as of 2021 was head of the CIA's Special Activities Center) and discussed the Al Qaeda threat and the USS Cole, which had been bombed in October 2000. "What would we be doing right now as a country if the Cole had snapped in half and gone to the bottom of the Gulf of Aden?" Spann asked Brian. "Would we be on a training course?". Later in 2001, Spann undertook temporary duty in Uzbekistan, where he helped train Uzbek commandos, and the Balkans. Spann returned from the Balkans on September 8, 2001, was inside CIA headquarters on 9/11 and was angered by the order to evacuate, asking colleagues: "Why are we leaving when we can stay and do something?". On October 17, 2001, Spann was one of the eight members of the CIA's Team Alpha who were inserted into the Darya Suf Valley, south of Mazar-i-Sharif. Team Alpha was flown into Afghanistan in two Black Hawk helicopters from the Karshi-Khanabad Air Base in Uzbekistan. The eight were the first Americans behind enemy lines after 9/11; the CIA's Jawbreaker team had arrived on September 26, but were located in terrain controlled by the Northern Alliance in the Panjshir Valley. Three days later, they were joined by 12 Green Berets from ODA 595. On October 27, Spann led a three-man team to Yakawlang, sixty miles west of Bamiyan, to prepare the way for the CIA’s Team Delta and ODA 553. CIA medic Mark Rausenberger and Captain Justin Sapp, a Green Beret, were under his command. Spann insisted that the Landing Zone at Yakawlang be named after his baby son, despite opposition from CIA headquarters. "There are no rules here,” he said. "We’re making the decisions and it’s going to be called LZ Jake." Spann's three-man team rejoined Team Alpha just before the fall of Mazar-i-Sharif on November 9.

== Death at Qala-i-Jangi ==
Spann was killed during an uprising at the Qala-i-Jangi compound near Mazar-i-Sharif in northern Afghanistan. Earlier that day, he and David Tyson, a CIA case officer and Uzbek-language specialist based in Tashkent, questioned John Walker Lindh, an American citizen and Taliban member, and other prisoners. Around 400 Al Qaeda prisoners had surrendered on November 24 and been kept overnight in the cellar of the Pink House, in the southern half of the fort. Spann focused intently on Lindh after another prisoner identified him as an Irishman. Spann asked Lindh: "Do you know the people here you’re working with are terrorists and killed other Muslims? There were several hundred Muslims killed in the bombing in New York City. Is that what the Quran teaches? I don’t think so. Are you going to talk to us?” Lindh remained silent. Two Afghan doctors, interviewed by author Toby Harnden, witnessed Spann's final moments. They saw the CIA officer, who was about five yards away from them, swing around and raise his AKMS rifle to his shoulder as the prisoners revolted amid sounds of gunfire and grenade explosions. Prisoners were rushing out, straight at Spann. The doctors saw Spann shoot two or three of them with his Kalashnikov before the Qatari prisoner and others who had been sitting close to the Pink House stood up and jumped on Spann from behind, pushing him to the ground. Spann pulled out his Glock 19 pistol and fired one or two shots before he was overwhelmed, disappearing beneath a pile of prisoners desperately trying to seize his weapons. Tyson ran toward Spann after hearing his comrade shout: "Dave, Dave, Dave." Tyson then used his Browning Hi-Power pistol to shoot dead four Al Qaeda prisoners on top of Spann. Kicking Spann and seeing blood on the ground, Tyson concluded Spann was dead. Tyson grabbed Spann's AKMS rifle and used it, and other weapons, to fight his way into the northern half of the fort, killing at least a dozen and possibly up to 40 Al Qaeda prisoners.

Afghans recovered his body on November 28 as CIA officers looked on. After Afghan Northern Alliance troops, backed by U.S. airstrikes, US Army Special Forces and British Special Boat Service members, eventually quelled the uprising. Some sources said that Spann fought with his AK-47 until it ran out of ammunition, then drew his pistol until it, too, emptied, then resorted to hand-to-hand combat before finally being overcome. In a news report by Time published shortly after the events, it was stated that Spann fought only with his pistol, killing three attackers before being overwhelmed by the more numerous prisoners.

Time reported shortly after the events:

According to members of a German television crew who were later trapped in the fort with Dave, Spann asked the prisoners who they were and why they joined the Taliban. They massed around him. 'Why are you here?' Spann asked one. 'To kill you,' came the reply as the man lunged at Spann's neck. Spann drew his pistol and shot the man dead. Dave shot another, then grabbed an AK-47 from an Alliance guard and opened fire. According to eyewitness accounts given to the German team, the Taliban fighters launched themselves at Spann, scrabbling at his flesh with their hands, kicking and beating him. Spann killed two more with his pistol before he disappeared under the crush.

A military autopsy concluded that Spann died from two gunshot wounds to the head "resulting in severe, rapidly fatal injury to the brain." One was a contact wound, indicating a gun had been held to his temple and a bullet fired through his head, exiting on the left. The other wound was "intermediate range," meaning that the shot had been fired close enough to leave powder marks. The second bullet had entered the right side of his forehead and exited from the back. Spann's body was flown back to the U.S. via Germany, where the autopsy was carried out. It was flown from Ramstein on board a US government Boeing 757-200 jet normally assigned as Vice President Dick Cheney’s Air Force Two. The 757 was being used by George Tenet, the CIA director, who had been in Islamabad meeting with President Pervez Musharraf of Pakistan. Spann's casket was also accompanied by Alex Hernandez, deputy chief of Team Alpha, and the head of the CIA's Ground Branch.

== Burial and memorial ==
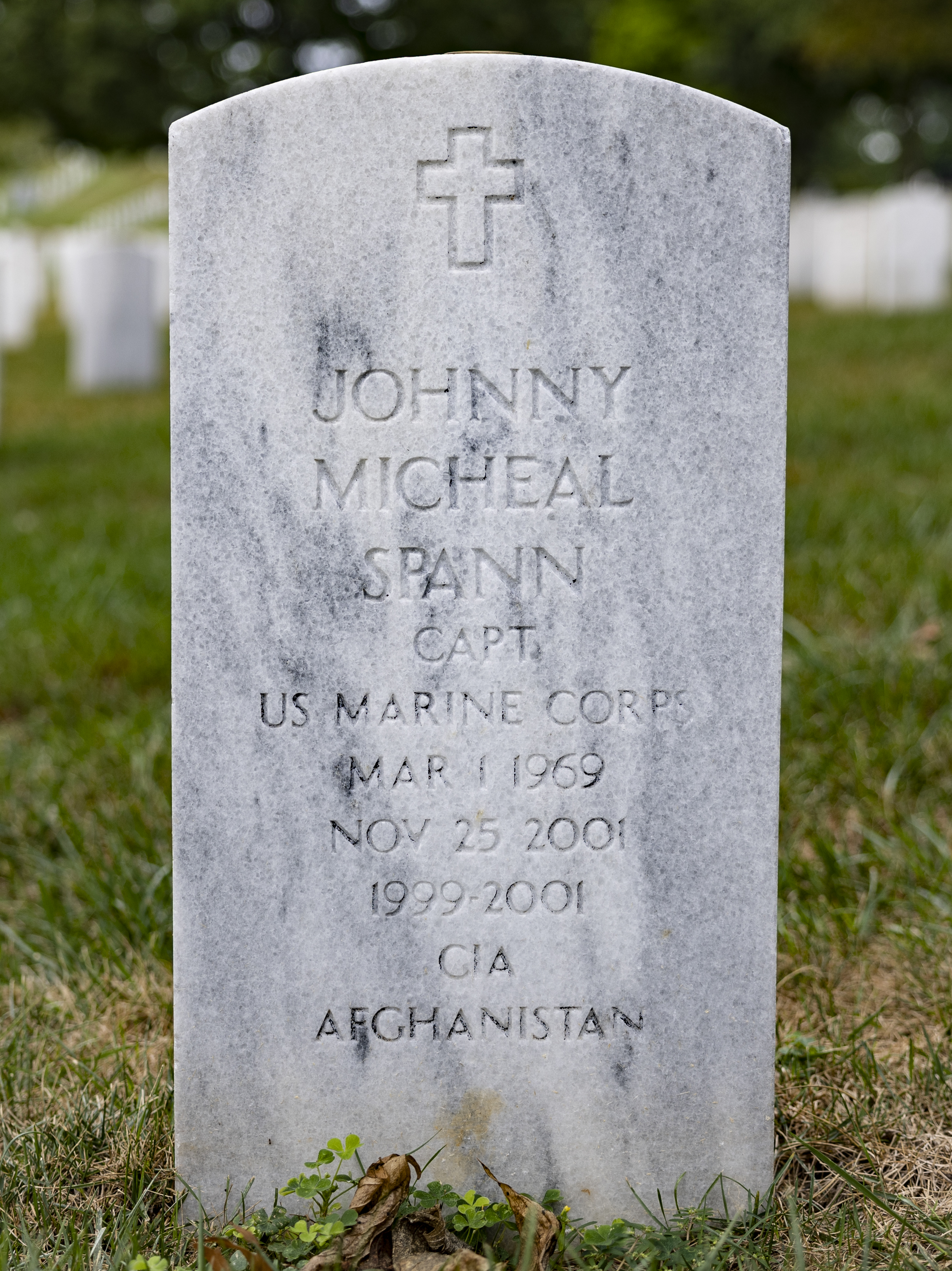
Spann's headstone in Arlington National Cemetery.

Spann was buried in Section 34 of Arlington National Cemetery on December 10, 2001. His widow Shannon Spann delivered the eulogy, saying: "I want to tell you that my husband is a hero. But Mike is a hero not because of the way that he died, but rather because of the way that he lived. Mike was prepared to give his life in Afghanistan, because he already gave his life every day to us at home.” Spann was memorialized with the 79th star on the CIA Memorial Wall at CIA headquarters in Langley, Virginia that commemorates individuals who died in the line of duty. Spann was posthumously awarded the Intelligence Star and the Exceptional Service Medallion. Because the Intelligence Star is considered the equivalent of the U.S. military's Silver Star, Spann was approved for burial in Arlington National Cemetery. A memorial to Mike Spann was established at Qala-i-Jangi in December 2002. A forward operating base was named in his honor. The Alabama legislature named a section of Alabama Highway 129 the "Johnny Micheal Spann Highway" in his honor.

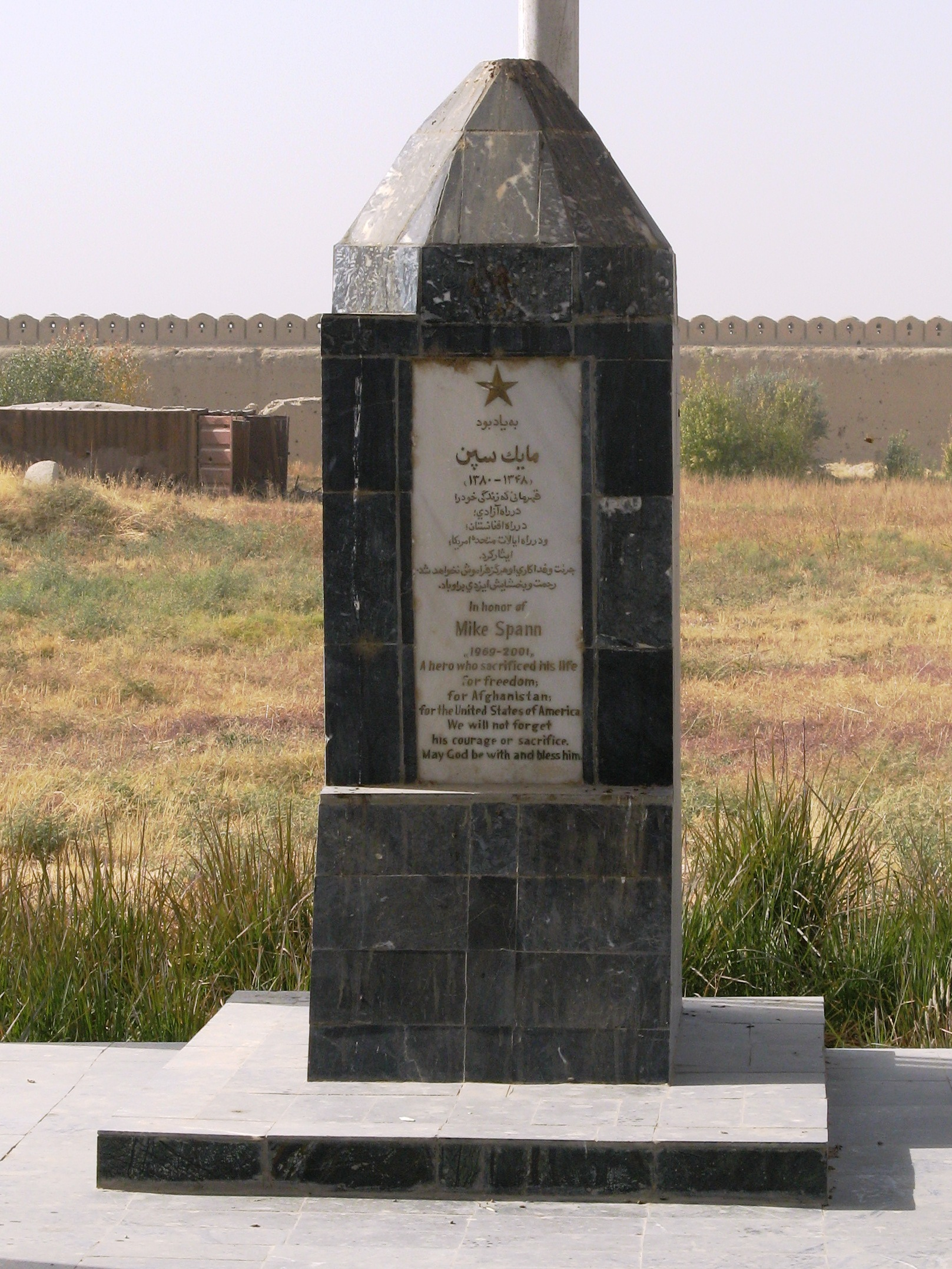
Memorial at Qala-i-Jangi Fortress

== Personal life ==
Spann lived in Manassas Park, Virginia, and was survived by his wife, Shannon Joy, also a CIA officer, and three children, Alison, Emily, and Jake. His ex-wife, Kathryn Ann Webb, mother of two of his children, Alison and Emily, died of cancer five weeks after Spann's death. Shannon Spann later married fellow CIA officer Thys Debruyn and had a second son, Lucas. Alison Spann became a journalist and in 2021 was a news anchor in Biloxi, Mississippi. Emily Spann graduated from her father’s alma mater, Auburn. Jake Spann entered Syracuse University.

== See also ==
- Battle of Qala-i-Jangi
- Operation Enduring Freedom

== Sources ==
- H.Con.Res. 281: Honoring Johnny Micheal Spann. United States House of Representatives. December 11, 2001.
