= Qala-i-Jangi =

19th century fortress in Afghanistan

Coordinates: 36.667°N 66.9841°E

The entrance of Qala-e Jangi Fortress as of 2025

Qala-i-Jangi (Dari/Pashto: قلعهِ جنگی) is a 19th-century fortress located near Mazar-i-Sharif in northern Afghanistan. It is known for being the site of a bloody 2001 Taliban uprising named the Battle of Qala-i-Jangi, in which at least 470 people were killed, including CIA agent Johnny "Mike" Spann. Qala-i-Jangi served as Northern Alliance warlord General Abdul Rashid Dostum's military garrison during the opening stages of the war in Afghanistan (2001–2021).

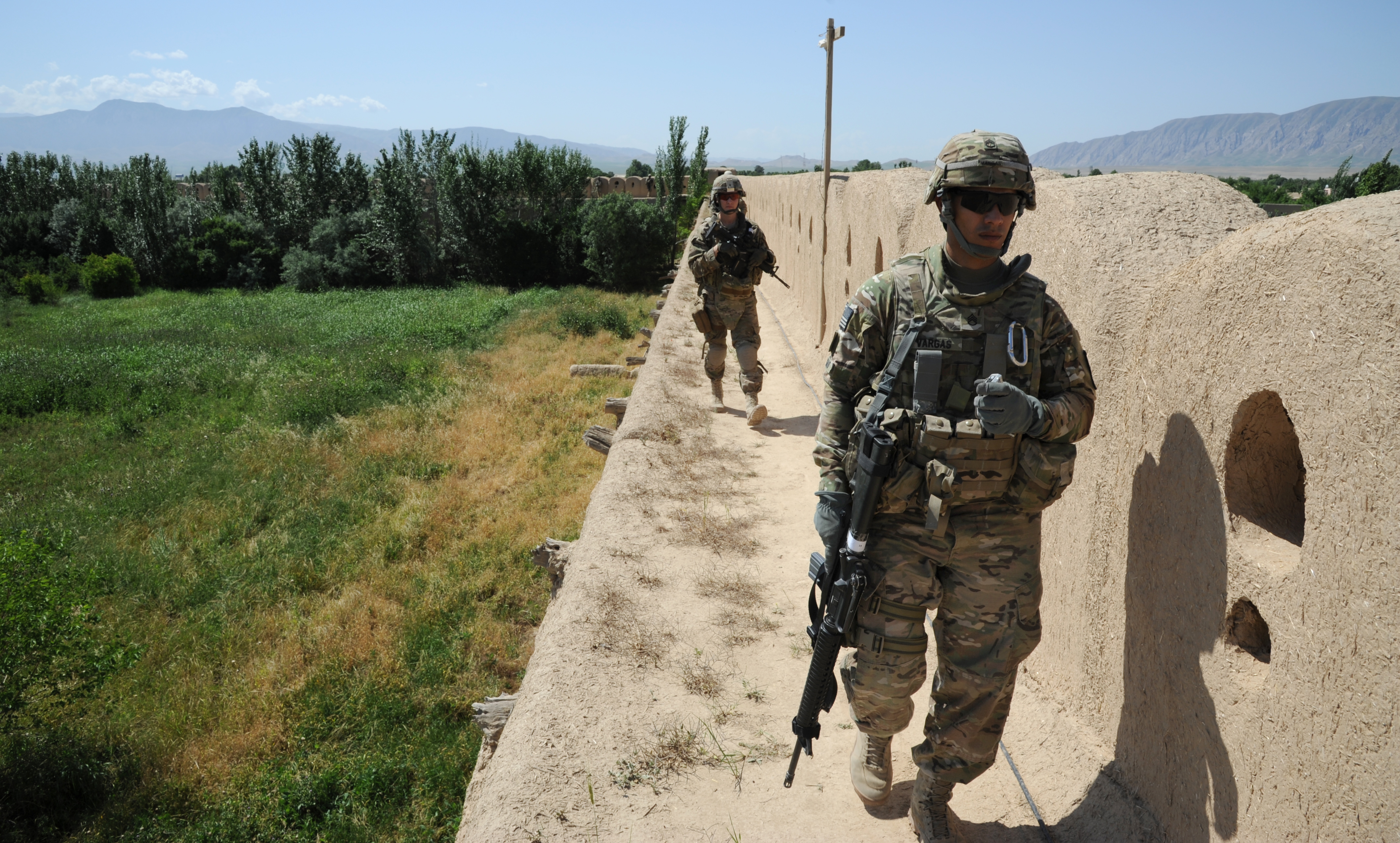
U.S. troops patrolling the walls of Qala-i-Jangi in 2008.

== History ==
The fort was built in 1889 by Abdur Rahman, the 19th-century “Iron Amir,” the first ruler to unite Afghanistan. Then known as Dehdadi after the village nearby, it was built with British funds and intended both to defend against Russian invasion and to suppress revolts by Uzbek tribes. Rahman described it as "the largest and strongest fort that had ever been built in Afghanistan." It took 18,000 workers 12 years to complete it. In 1929, about 300 Russian troops were besieged inside the fort by 20,000 Turkmens. The name Qala-i-Jangi was probably not given to the fort until the 1940s. The Russians, with Dostum’s support, occupied it again after their 1979 invasion. Mujahideen attacked Qala-i Jangi in 1981, removing 170 pro-Soviet Afghan soldiers. The Taliban occupied the fort for most of the time from 1994 to 2001. Abdul Rashid Dostum, of the Northern Alliance, held the fort briefly in 1997, with 20,000 militia.

== Description ==
In 2001, the fort was 600 yards (550 m) long, 300 yards (270 m) wide. It was constructed out of wooden beams, mud and straw. At each corner a mud tower rose 80 feet (24 m) high and 150 feet (46 m) across. Lack of rainfall, with only 4 inches (100 mm) of rain on average annually, enabled the structure to avoid liquification. It was a walled city, divided evenly into northern and southern courtyards by an 80 feet (24 m) wall. It contained a gold-domed mosque, a 75 feet (23 m) square "Pink House," erected in the 1980s by the occupying Soviet Union, as a medical facility. On November 26, 2001, the north-eastern tower was destroyed by an errant American JDAM missile.

== See also ==
- List of prisons in Afghanistan
