= Doug Stanton =

American writer

- Occupations: Journalist, lecturer, screenwriter
- Notable work: Horse Soldiers (2009)

Doug Stanton is an American journalist, lecturer, screenwriter, and author of New York Times bestsellers In Harm's Way: The Sinking of the USS Indianapolis and the Extraordinary Story of Its Survivors (2001) and Horse Soldiers (2009), which is the basis of the 2018 feature film 12 Strong.

In Harm’s Way spent more than six months on the New York Times bestseller list and became required reading on the U.S. Navy's reading list for officers. The unabridged audiobook edition of In Harm’s Way won the 2017 Audie Award in the History category.

Stanton‘s third book, The Odyssey of Echo Company, was published in 2017.

== Early life and education ==
Stanton attended Interlochen Arts Academy, Hampshire College, and received an MFA from the Writers’ Workshop at the University of Iowa, where he graduated with coursework in both fiction and poetry workshops. Stanton has taught writing and English at the high school and college level, worked as a commercial sports fisherman in Provincetown, Massachusetts, and caretaker of Robert Frost's house in Vermont.

== Career ==
Stanton is an author and a founder of the National Writers Series (2009) and the Traverse City Film Festival (2005). He graduated from the Interlochen Arts Academy in Michigan and Hampshire College in Massachusetts. Since graduating from the University of Iowa Writer's Workshop, he has worked as a contributing editor at Esquire, Sports Afield, Outside, and Men's Journal. Stanton has written extensively on travel, sports, entertainment, and history.

Throughout his career, he nearly drowned in Cape Horn waters, survived a mugging by jungle revolutionaries, played basketball with George Clooney, and took an acting lesson from Harrison Ford.

Stanton appeared on national TV and radio outlets, including the Today Show, CNN, Imus In The Morning, Discovery, A&E, History channel, Fox News, NPR, Morning Joe, C-SPAN’s Book-TV, PBS, and NBC Nightly News, and has been covered in prominent publications, including the Wall Street Journal, Washington Post, Miami Herald, New York Times. Drawing on his experiences in the U.S. and overseas, and with many contacts in various branches of the U.S. military and government, Stanton lectures nationally to corporate and civic groups, libraries, writing & book clubs, and universities about current events, international affairs, politics, and writing.

His writings appeared in the New York Times, The New York Times Book Review, TIME, the Washington Post, Men’s Journal, Sports Afield, The Daily Beast, and Newsweek; and at Esquire and Outside, where he also has been a contributing editor.

Stanton’s Horse Soldiers was a best-seller book on USA Today, Wall Street Journal, Los Angeles Times, Chicago Tribune, Entertainment Weekly, Publishers Weekly, and IndieBound. Horse Soldiers was also named a “Notable Book” by The New York Times. The Great Lakes Independent Booksellers Association made Horse Soldiers a “Great Lakes, Great Reads” book, and it was chosen as a “Best Book” by Publishers Weekly, Christian Science Monitor, Barnes & Noble, and Amazon.com.

Stanton’s book In Harm’s Way, about the sinking of the WWII cruiser USS Indianapolis (CA-35) and the gallant fight of her crew to exonerate their court-martialed captain, was also an international bestseller (UK’s The Sunday Times).

The book has been translated into German, Japanese, Danish, Spanish, and Italian. In Harm’s Way appeared on the Publishers Weekly, Los Angeles Times, Washington Post, USA Today, Christian Science Monitor, Entertainment Weekly, Publishers Weekly, Wall Street Journal, Chicago Tribune, Detroit Free Press, and IndieBound bestseller lists, and was a Barnes & Noble and Amazon Notable/Best book.

In Harm’s Way was a finalist for the WH Smith Award in the UK, and the Great Lakes Book Festival Best Book Award, and was chosen as a New York Review of Book “Best Books In Print,” a Publishers Weekly “Notable Book,” and a Michigan Notable Book of the Year. In Harm's Way also won the 2017 Audie Awards in the history/biography category from the Audio Publishers Association.

In Harm's Way is also included in the US Navy’s required “core values” reading list for naval officers, and is regularly used in high schools throughout the country as part of the history curriculum. In Harm's Way has been chosen by several book clubs as part of “Community Reads” programs, appealing to a wide range of readers.

In July 2001, the US Department of the Navy, joining with the US Congress, exonerated the ship’s court-martialed captain, Charles Butler McVay. This was a historic reversal of fortune for the survivors of the worst disaster at sea in US naval history. In Harm’s Way was credited by those close to the story with helping in this exoneration.

The Series' first guests were father-and-son authors Elmore Leonard and Peter Leonard. Proceeds from the Series benefit a scholarship fund for high school students with an interest in pursuing college creative writing. Since 2009, the Series has hosted nearly 150 authors, journalists, screenwriters, poets, and thinkers, including Tom Brokaw, Mary Karr, Mario Batali, Michael Sandel, Vince Gilligan, Chip Johannessen, Janet Leahy and Lisa Albert, Harlan Coben, George Packer, Colum McCann, Lee Child, Lucy Kalanithi, David Sedaris, Sebastian Junger, Michael Paterniti, Anna Quindlen, Nikki Giovanni, Jodi Picoult, Ann Patchett, and Margaret Atwood.

NWS is considered by writers, editors, and readers to be one of the United States' “top-tier book events.” As a non-profit, the National Writers Series annually awards scholarships to college-bound students interested in writing.

Stanton founded a scholarship fund devoted to the educations of families of USS Indianapolis survivors.

== Personal life ==
Stanton lives with his wife, Anne Stanton, and their three children, in Traverse City, Michigan where he co-founded the National Writers Series, a year-round book festival featuring conversations with American storytellers; and Front Street Writers, a free, for-credit writing workshop for public high school students.

== Books ==
- In Harm's Way: The Sinking of the USS Indianapolis and the Extraordinary Story of Its Survivors, Henry Holt, 2001 (ISBN 0805066322)
- Horse Soldiers: The Extraordinary Story of a Band of U.S. Soldiers Who Rode to Victory in Afghanistan, Scribner, 2009 (ISBN 1416580514)
- The Odyssey of Echo Company: The 1968 Tet Offensive and the Epic Battle to Survive the Vietnam War, Scribner, 2017 (ISBN 1476761914)
