= 2001 Sayyd Alma Kalay airstrike =

Friendly fire incident during the Afghanistan war

Sayyd Alma Kalay airstrike
- Part of the War in Afghanistan
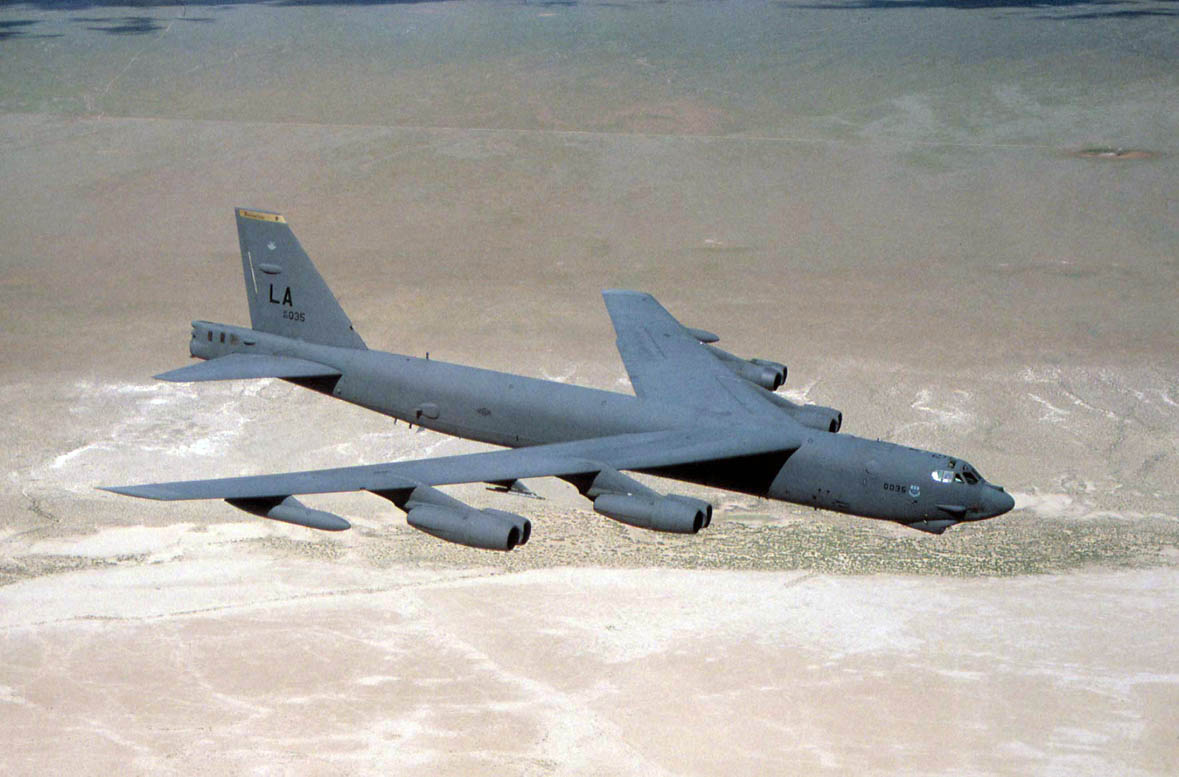
- A Boeing B-52 Stratofortress.
- Type: airstrike
- Location: Sayyd Alma Kalay, near the Arghandab River, Oruzgan Province, Afghanistan
- Target: United States (friendly fire)
- Date: December 5, 2001
- Executed by: United States
- Casualties: 3 Americans and 10 Afghans killed 40 injured

The Sayyd Alma Kalayy airstrike was a major friendly fire incident via airstrike during the Invasion of Afghanistan. It happened on December 5, 2001 when a U.S. soldier responsible for calling in airstrikes accidentally misguided the Boeing B-52 bomber to strike a hill held by American Special Forces and dozens of their Afghan allies.

== Events ==
Two days earlier, U.S. Army Special Forces then-Captain Jason Amerine (leading Operational Detachment Alpha 574) and Afghan tribal leader Hamid Karzai had been fighting in the towns of Tarinkot and Shawali Kowt before advancing towards the village of Sayyd Alma Kalay. The Taliban withdrew from the town, and Amerine and Karzai entered the town. After both talked in the headquarters, Amerine left to discuss further airstrikes with another officer. While studying a map, a huge explosion hit the hill near them, apparently from one of their own bombs. Amerine was wounded, while many on the hill were killed or also wounded. A military investigation revealed that the U.S. Air Force Combat Controller from the headquarters in Sayyd Alma Kalay who arrived earlier in the day made a mistake: due to a technical error with his issued GPS receiver, he did not realize that he had mistakenly given his own coordinates for an airstrike to the Boeing B-52 Stratofortress that ultimately dropped a 2,000 lb JDAM bomb on the hill, where several Americans and Afghans were located.

== Casualties ==
Three of Amerine's friends died:

- Master Sergeant Jefferson Davis, 39 years old, of Watauga, Tennessee
- Sergeant First Class Dan Petithory, 32 years old, of Cheshire, Massachusetts
- Staff Sergeant Brian Prosser, 28 years old, of Bakersfield, California

10 Afghans died as well. Forty Afghans and Americans, including Amerine, were wounded. The wounded were taken to Ramstein Air Base in Germany for treatment.
