= Operational Detachment Alpha 574 =

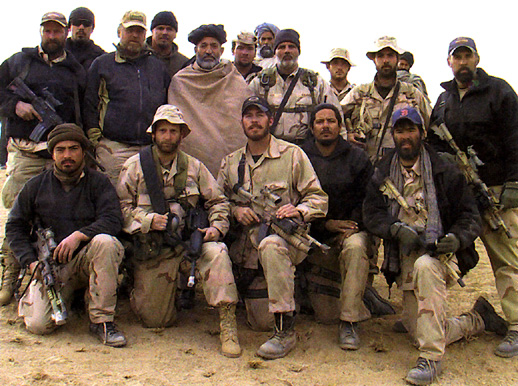
- Hamid Karzai with Jason Amerine and his men in 2001
- Active: 1997, 2001
- Country: United States
- Branch: United States Army
- Type: A-Team
- Role: 1997-Sent to Saudi Arabia as a Mobile Training Team (MTT) to train the Saudi Arabia National Guard (SANG) 2001-Set condition for a democratic government in Afghanistan.
- Size: 12 personnel
- Nickname: Texas One-Two
- Engagements: United States invasion of Afghanistan; Battle of Tarin Kowt; Battle of Shawali Kowt; Battle of Sayyd Alma Kalay; Capture of Kandahar

Commanders
- Notable commanders: Jason Amerine

Operational Detachment Alpha 574 is a part of the United States Army's Third Battalion, 5th Special Forces Group. At the beginning of Operation Enduring Freedom it operated in Afghanistan to help defeat the Taliban and create conditions for the establishment of a democratic government in Afghanistan. Jason Amerine was noted for leading the group in several battles of the Invasion of Afghanistan.

== Invasion of Afghanistan ==
ODA 574, callsign "Texas 12" (Texas One-Two), was a group of 12 U.S Special Forces soldiers from Alpha Company, 3rd Battalion, 5th SFG under the command of Captain Jason Amerine. They deployed from Karshi-Khanabad Air Base (nicknamed K2 by the Special Forces) to just outside of Tarin Kowt on 14 November, accompanied by Pashtun militia leader, Hamid Karzai, who was returning from exile. Their primary objective was to capture the Islamic spiritual center in the city of Kandahar. To capture the province, it was necessary to first capture the town of Tarin Kowt. The civilians of the town overthrew the Taliban governor, so Karzai and Amerine moved in to help defend it. The 12 Americans of ODA 574, assisted by U.S. close air support and 35 Afghans, successfully defended Tarin Kowt against 1,000 Taliban delivered by 100 trucks. After this victory, they went on to defeat the Taliban further along the Arghandab River, at Shawali Kowt and Sayyd Alma Kalay.

=== Friendly fire incident ===
As Karzai's forces pushed south towards Kandahar, an error by an attached United States Air Force Tactical Air Control Party on 5 December caused a Joint Direct Attack Munition (JDAM) to fall short of its intended target, 100 yards from their position. It killed Master Sgt. Jefferson Donald "Donnie" Davis, Staff Sgt. Brian Cody Prosser, and SFC Daniel H. Petithory and twenty members of Karzai's militia. Five other members of ODA 574 and Karzai were wounded. Five minutes after the friendly fire incident, Hamid Karzai was notified by a satellite phone call that he'd been selected to lead Afghanistan's new interim government.

=== Capture of Kandahar ===
Hamid Karzai accepted the surrender of the Taliban on December 5, 2001, in Showali Kowt as the members of ODA 574 were medically evacuated out of Afghanistan. Various units streamed into Kandahar after the surrender including ODA 586 and ODA 524.

== Awards ==
For their bravery in Afghanistan, Operational Detachment Alpha 574 was awarded three Silver Stars, four Bronze Star Medals with "V" device for valor, three Bronze Star Medals, and eleven Purple Hearts. Amerine himself was awarded a Bronze Star and a Purple Heart.
