= Battle of Tarinkot =

2001 battle of the War in Afghanistan

- Part of the United States invasion of Afghanistan
Date	November 13–14, 2001
Location	Tarinkot, Afghanistan
Result	Northern Alliance/American victory

Belligerents
Northern Alliance; United States	Islamic Emirate of Afghanistan; Taliban

Commanders and leaders
(Afghanistan) Hamid Karzai (United States) Jason Amerine	Unknown

Strength
30–60; 11 soldiers (ODA 574 and 1 AFSOC CCT)	50–500

The Battle of Tarinkot took place in 2001 during the War in Afghanistan. On November 14, 2001, ODA 574 and Hamid Karzai inserted into Uruzgan Province via 4 MH-60K helicopters with a small force of guerrillas. In response to the approach of Karzai's force, the inhabitants of the town of Tarinkot revolted and expelled their Taliban administrators. Karzai traveled to Tarinkot to meet with the town elders. While he was there, the Taliban marshaled a force of 50—500 men to retake Tarinkot. Karzai's small force plus the American contingent, which consisted of US Army Special Forces from ODA 574 and their US Air Force Combat Controller, Tech Sergeant Alex Yoshimoto, were deployed in front of the town to block their advance. Relying heavily on close air support directed by Yoshimoto, the American/Afghan force managed to halt the Taliban advance and drive them away from the town.

The defeat of the Taliban at Tarinkot was an important victory for Karzai, who used the victory to recruit more men to his fledgling guerrilla band. His force would grow in size to a peak of around 800 men. On November 30, they left Tarinkot and began advancing on Kandahar.

The story has been told in The Only Thing Worth Dying For, by Eric Blehm, detailing the experiences of Operational Detachment Alpha 574, a U.S. Army Special Forces ODA.
