= Jason Amerine =

U.S. Special Forces officer in Afghanistan

- Born: 1971 (age 54–55); San Gabriel, California, United States
- Military career
- Allegiance: United States
- Branch: United States Army
- Service years: 1988–2016
- Rank: Lieutenant Colonel
- Commands: Operational Detachment Alpha 574
- Conflicts: War in Afghanistan; Battle of Tarin Kowt; Battle of Shawali Kowt; Battle of Sayyd Alma Kalay
- Awards: Legion of Merit; Bronze Star Medal; Purple Heart; Defense Meritorious Service Medal; Army Commendation Medal (3); Army Achievement Medal (2)

Jason Amerine (born 1971) is a retired lieutenant colonel in the United States Army Special Forces. He served in the Invasion of Afghanistan in 2001, in which he aided tribal leader Hamid Karzai in fighting a guerrilla war against the Taliban. For bravery in the invasion, he was awarded the Bronze Star Medal and the Purple Heart. He was also a "Real Hero" in the America's Army video game.

== Military career ==
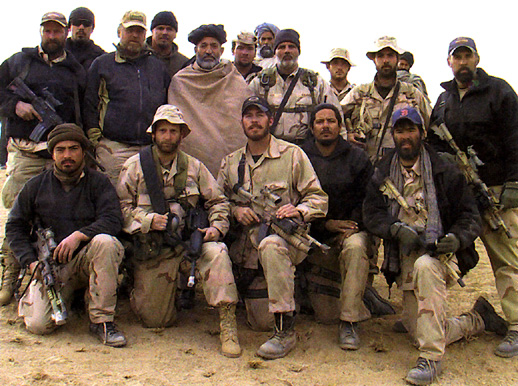
Amerine and ODA 574 alongside Hamid Karzai during the 2001 invasion of Afghanistan.

After graduating from West Point, Amerine volunteered for Ranger duty and then for Special Forces Assessment and Selection (SFAS) and thereafter headed up Texas 12, the codename for Operational Detachment Alpha 574 of the Army's 3rd Battalion, 5th Special Forces Group. When training Kazakh paratroops in Kazakhstan, he received news of the September 11 attacks. He was assigned to help Afghan freedom fighters overthrow the Taliban rule in Afghanistan. He joined forces with local tribal leader Hamid Karzai, who assisted the US invasion via his own guerrilla war. In Uruzgan, Amerine with his Americans and Karzai with his freedom fighters both defended the town of Tarin Kowt from a Taliban attack. Next, the leaders marched on a campaign along the Arghandab River, fighting the Taliban at Shawali Kowt and Sayyd Alma Kalay. Both were US-Afghan victories, eventually leading to the capture of Kandahar, an Islamic spiritual center. Shortly after Karzai was elected to be interim leader of Afghanistan, Amerine was hit by friendly fire from a bomber. He lost three of his friends in the explosion, and learned three days later (in a hospital in Germany) that Kandahar had finally fallen, ending the war. After recovering, he completed a master's degree in international affairs with an emphasis in national security at the George Bush School of Government and Public Service at Texas A&M University, then taught at West Point as a Social Sciences, and later, an Arabic Language teacher.

== Awards ==
On January 15, 2002, LTC Amerine was awarded the Bronze Star Medal with "V" device and the Purple Heart for his actions in Afghanistan. According to his citation: "His actions in the face of overwhelming odds and direct hostile aggression resulted in the surrender of Kandahar by Taliban forces... and directly contributed to his unit's and his country's success." Lt. Gen. Paul T. Mikolashek, who oversaw the land war in Afghanistan, praised his exceptional courage, dedication to mission, and selfless commitment to his comrades. He was a guest at President George W. Bush's State of the Union address, where he said, "Serving as an officer in the United States Army has been the greatest privilege in my life. In Afghanistan, I commanded American and Afghan soldiers, each fighting for his own nation and his people, yet united in a common cause as they entrusted one another with their lives. There is no greater courage than for people to fight side by side against the terrible odds they faced with such impenetrable faith in one another." Amerine's story and the story of his eleven-man A-Team of Green Berets is told in the New York Times and Wall Street Journal bestselling book, The Only Thing Worth Dying For by Eric Blehm.

== Efforts to free Bowe Bergdahl ==
While working on the Army Staff in 2012, Amerine was asked to seek the freedom of Bowe Bergdahl after efforts to rescue him had stalled for several years. Amerine's team developed a plan to trade Bowe Bergdahl and several Western hostages for Haji Bashir Noorzai. The deal was widely supported by the US government as well as Pakistan. When the Taliban sat down with the State Department to conclude the deal, the State Department instead chose to release five Taliban prisoners in exchange for Bergdahl, a deal they hoped would jump start peace talks with the Taliban. Those talks failed to materialize. Noorzai was ultimately traded for Mark Frerichs in 2022.

== Whistleblower status ==
In 2014 Amerine provided information to U.S. Rep. Duncan D. Hunter (R-CA) to assist the Congressman in preparing legislation to improve U.S. hostage-freeing efforts. The Army then received a complaint from the FBI that Amerine had provided classified information to Hunter. In early 2015, the Army initiated an investigation, which those close to Amerine regarded as retaliation for criticizing the Army's hostage efforts. In May 2015, Amerine's West Point classmates initiated a Whitehouse.gov petition to "provide LTC Jason Amerine, SF, US Army, Whistleblower Protection and end all investigations and unfavorable actions." On June 11, 2015, Amerine was one of five people who testified before the U.S. Senate Committee on Homeland Security and Governmental Affairs when it convened a hearing entitled, "Blowing the Whistle on Retaliation: Accounts of Current and Former Federal Agency Whistleblowers." Amerine was ultimately cleared of all wrongdoing and awarded the Legion of Merit.

== Later career ==
Amerine retired from the Army in 2016. He was featured in the second season of the Serial podcast, which focused on the Bowe Bergdahl case.
