= Amerine =

Amerine is a surname. Notable people with the surname include:

- Jason Amerine (born 1971), lieutenant colonel in the United States Army Special Forces
- Maynard Amerine (1911–1998), American pioneering researcher of wine

== See also ==
- Warren Amerine Stephens (born 1957), American businessman and diplomat
