= United States invasion of Afghanistan =

2001 multinational military operation

- Part of the Afghan conflict, war in Afghanistan and the war on terror
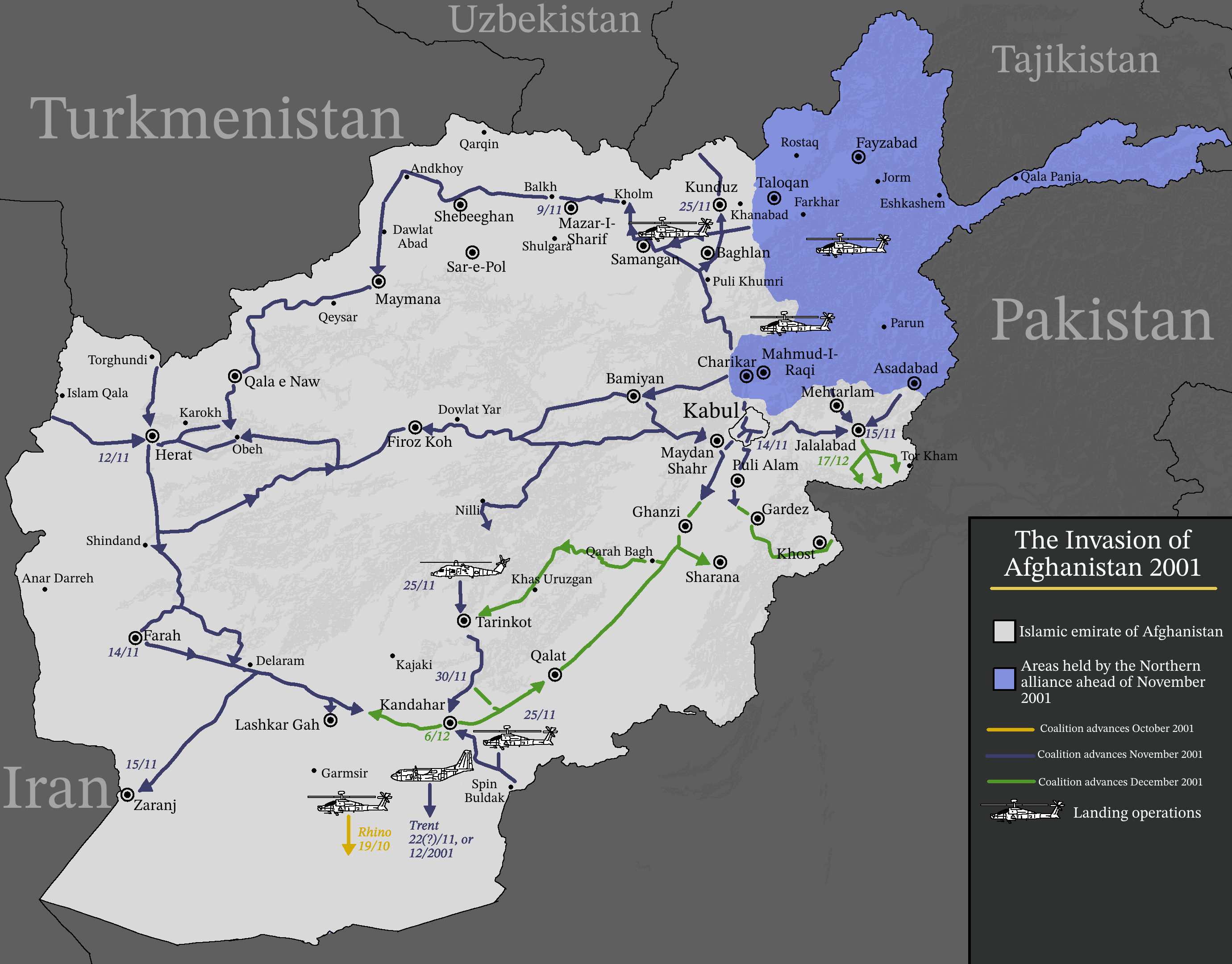
- The invasion of Afghanistan by the US-led coalition (19 October - 17 December)
Date	7 October – 17 December 2001 (2 months, 1 week and 3 days)
Location	Afghanistan
Result	American-led coalition victory
Territorial changes	Collapse of the Islamic Emirate of Afghanistan (1996–2001); Establishment of the Transitional Islamic State of Afghanistan; Start of the war in Afghanistan and Taliban insurgency

Belligerents
Northern Alliance; United States; United Kingdom; France; Canada; Italy; Turkey; Germany; Australia; New Zealand; Iran	Islamic Emirate of Afghanistan (Taliban); Non-state allies: Al-Qaeda; 055 Brigade; Islamic Movement of Uzbekistan Tehreek-e-Nafaz-e-Shariat-e-Mohammadi Jama'at al-Tawhid wal-Jihad

Commanders and leaders
(Afghanistan) Burhanuddin Rabbani; (Afghanistan) Abdul Rashid Dostum; (Afghanistan) Muhammad Mohaqiq; (United States) George W. Bush; (United States) Donald Rumsfeld; (United Kingdom) Tony Blair; (United Kingdom) Geoff Hoon; (France) Jacques Chirac; (France) Alain Richard; (Canada) Jean Chrétien; (Canada) Art Eggleton; (Australia) John Howard; (Australia) Peter Reith; (Australia) Robert Hill; (Italy) Silvio Berlusconi; (Italy) Antonio Martino; (Turkey) Ahmet Necdet Sezer; (Turkey) Sabahattin Çakmakoğlu; (Germany) Gerhard Schröder; (Germany) Rudolf Scharping; (New Zealand) Helen Clark; (New Zealand) Mark Burton; (Iran) Yahya Safavi	(Taliban) Mullah Omar; (Taliban) Obaidullah Akhund; (al-Qaeda) Osama bin Laden; (al-Qaeda) Ayman al-Zawahiri; (al-Qaeda) Mohammed Atef X; Tohir Yoʻldosh; Juma Namangani; Sufi Muhammad; Abu Musab al-Zarqawi (WIA)

Strength
(United States) 5,500; 15,000–20,000	45,000; 10,000 Pakistani volunteers (claimed); 2,700

Casualties and losses
(United States) 13 killed (including 1 CIA officer and 4 non-combat deaths); 600 killed	8,000–12,000 killed or 15,000 killed/captured
- 1,537–2,375 civilians killed

Shortly after the September 11 attacks in 2001, the United States declared the war on terror and subsequently led a multinational military operation against Taliban-ruled Afghanistan. The stated goal was to dismantle al-Qaeda, which had executed the attacks under the leadership of Osama bin Laden, and to deny al-Qaeda militants a safe base of operations in Afghanistan by toppling the ruling Taliban government. The United Kingdom was a key ally of the United States, offering support for military action from the start of the invasion preparations. The American military presence in Afghanistan greatly bolstered the Northern Alliance, which had been locked in a losing fight with the Taliban during the Third Afghan Civil War since 1996. Prior to the beginning of the United States' war effort, the Taliban had seized around 85% of Afghanistan's territory as well as the capital city of Kabul, effectively confining the Northern Alliance to Badakhshan province and smaller surrounding areas. The American-led invasion on 7 October 2001, marked the first phase of what would become the 20-year-long war in Afghanistan.

After the September 11 attacks, American president George W. Bush demanded that the Taliban government hand over Osama bin Laden to the United States, and also expel al-Qaeda militants from Afghanistan; bin Laden had been active in Afghanistan since the Soviet–Afghan War and was already wanted by the Federal Bureau of Investigation for his role in the 1998 United States embassy bombings. The Taliban refused to extradite bin Laden unless the US produced evidence of his guilt. The Taliban did not respond to the demands to shut down terrorist bases or extradite other suspected terrorists. In response, the United States launched Operation Enduring Freedom on 7 October 2001, alongside the United Kingdom. The two countries were later joined by a large multinational force, made up of multiple NATO members and two of their major non-NATO allies, as well as Afghanistan's local Northern Alliance. The invasion effort made rapid progress for the next two months as the coalition captured Kabul on 13 November and toppled the Taliban by 17 December, after which international military bases were set up near major cities across the country. However, most members of al-Qaeda and the Taliban were not captured: during the Battle of Tora Bora, several fighters, including bin Laden, escaped into neighboring Pakistan or otherwise retreated to remote regions deep within the Hindu Kush.

In December 2001, the United Nations Security Council established the International Security Assistance Force (ISAF) to oversee military operations in Afghanistan and also train the new Afghan National Security Forces. At the Bonn Conference that same month, Hamid Karzai was selected to lead the Afghan Interim Administration. Simultaneously, the Taliban's founding leader Muhammad Umar reorganized the movement to wage asymmetric warfare against the coalition, and by 2002, the group had launched an insurgency against the American-led war effort. Protracted fighting continued for the next two decades, and by mid-2021, the international coalition and the United States had begun to withdraw from the country amidst a nationwide Taliban offensive. In August 2021, the Taliban captured Kabul and toppled the Afghan government, re-establishing their rule in the form of a second Islamic emirate.

== Background ==
In 2001, Afghanistan had been at war for over 20 years. The communist People's Democratic Party of Afghanistan (PDPA) seized power in 1978, and its policies sparked a popular uprising. The Soviet Union, sensing PDPA weakness, intervened in 1979 to support the regime. The Soviet entry into Afghanistan prompted its Cold War rivals, especially the United States and Saudi Arabia, to support rebels fighting against the Soviet-backed PDPA. While the secular and socialist government controlled the cities, the religiously motivated mujahidin held sway in much of the countryside. The most important mujahidin commander was Ahmad Shah Massoud, who led the well-organized Tajik forces. The American Central Intelligence Agency (CIA) worked closely with Pakistan's Inter-Service Intelligence (ISI) to funnel foreign support for the mujahidin. The war also attracted Arab volunteers, known as "Afghan Arabs", including Osama bin Laden.

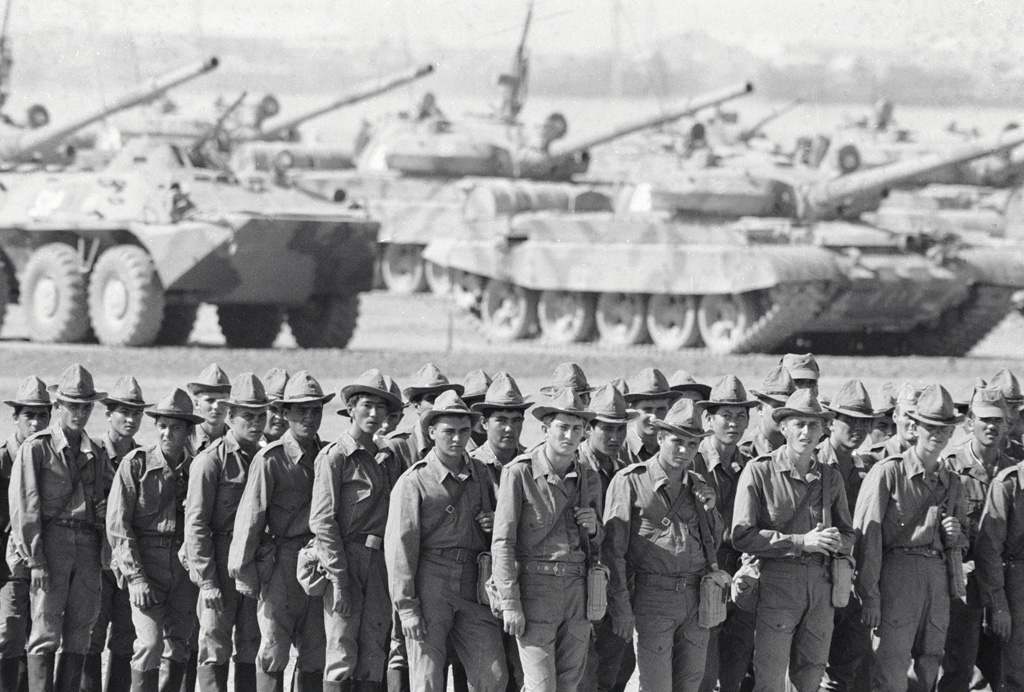
Soviet troops in 1986 during the Soviet–Afghan War

After the withdrawal of the Soviet military from Afghanistan in February 1989, the PDPA regime collapsed in 1992. In the resulting power vacuum, the mujahidin leaders vied for dominance in a civil war from 1992 to 1996. By then, bin Laden had already left the country. The United States' interest in Afghanistan also diminished. In 1994, a Pashtun mujahid named Muhammad Umar founded the Taliban movement in Kandahar. His followers were religious students and sought to end warlord rule through strict adherence to Islamic law. By the end of 1994, the Taliban had captured all of Kandahar Province.

=== Taliban vs. Northern Alliance (1996–2001) ===
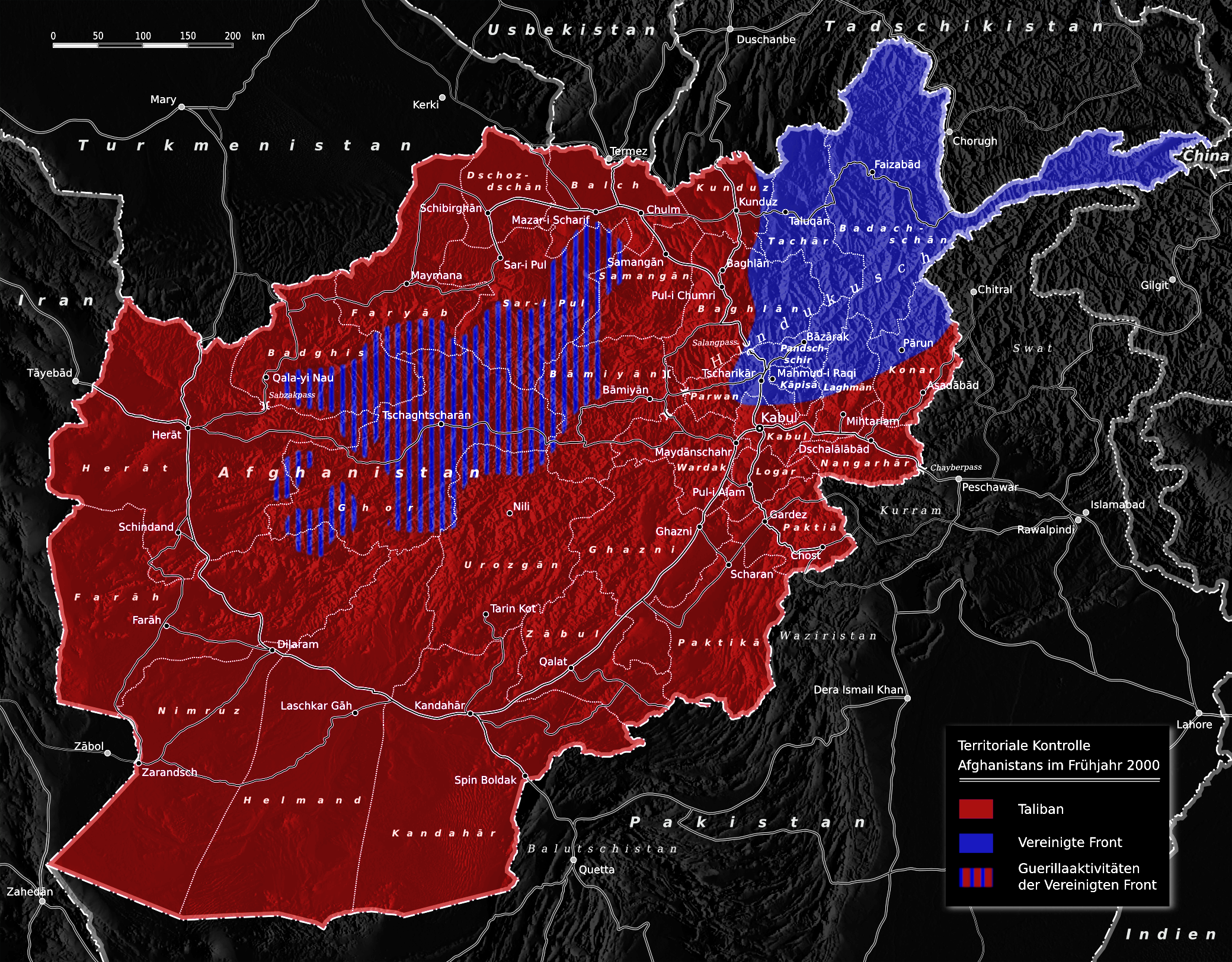
Taliban (red) and Northern Alliance (blue) control over Afghanistan in 2000

In 1996, with military support from Pakistan and financial support from Saudi Arabia, the Taliban seized Kabul and founded the Islamic Emirate of Afghanistan. They imposed their fundamentalist interpretation of Islam in areas under their control, issuing edicts forbidding women to work outside the home or attend school and requiring them to abide by harsh rules on veiling and seclusion.

After the Taliban takeover of Kabul, Massoud retreated north to his native Panjshir Valley and formed a resistance movement against the Taliban, called the United Front or the Northern Alliance. In addition to Massoud's Tajik force, the United Front included Uzbeks under the former PDPA general Abdul Rashid Dostum and Hazara factions. (Note: The Hazaras are a minority ethnic group adhering to Shia Islam who live in the mountains of central Afghanistan.) The Northern Alliance received varying degrees of support from Russia, Iran, and India. Like the Taliban, Massoud also raised money by trafficking drugs. By 2001, the Taliban controlled 80% of the country, with the Northern Alliance confined to the country's northeast corner.

==== Al-Qaeda ====
After almost five years of shelter, bin Laden was expelled from Sudan in 1996 and arrived in Jalalabad, Afghanistan. He had founded al-Qaeda in the late 1980s to continue jihad after the end of the Soviet–Afghan War. He moved al-Qaeda's operations to eastern Afghanistan and developed a close relationship with the Taliban. However some key Taliban members, such as the foreign minister Wakil Muttawakil, disapproved of the alliance with al-Qaeda because bin Laden's terrorist activities were complicating the Taliban's quest for international recognition of their government. In 2000, Muhammad Umar visited bin Laden and forbade him from attacking the United States while he was a guest of the Taliban. During the 1990s, the CIA and Delta Force planned several operations to kill or capture bin Laden, but President Bill Clinton never ordered them to proceed.

==== Change in U.S. policy towards Afghanistan ====
During the early years of the Clinton administration, the US had no clear policy toward Afghanistan. The 1998 US embassy bombings, however, masterminded by al-Qaeda, provoked President Clinton to order missile strikes on militant training camps in Afghanistan; bin Laden was indicted for his involvement in the bombings. In 1999 both the US and the United Nations enacted sanctions against the Taliban in United Nations Security Council Resolution 1267, which demanded the Taliban surrender bin Laden for trial in the US and close all terrorist bases in Afghanistan. At the time, the only collaboration between Massoud and the US was an effort with the CIA to trace bin Laden. The US provided no support for Massoud's fight against the Taliban.

A change in US policy was effected in early September 2001. The Bush administration agreed on a plan to start supporting Massoud. On 10 September, a meeting of top national security officials agreed that the Taliban would be presented with an ultimatum to hand over bin Laden and other al-Qaeda operatives. If the Taliban refused, the US would provide covert military aid to anti-Taliban groups to attempt to overthrow the Taliban.

==== Military situation on the eve of the 9/11 attacks ====
On 9 September 2001, two al-Qaeda members posing as journalists killed Massoud by detonating a bomb hidden in their video camera battery belt during an interview. Muhammad Fahim became the new leader of the Northern Alliance. The Alliance had 15,000–20,000 fighters distributed across five locations. On the Kabul front, Taliban and Northern Alliance forces faced each other from trenches across the Shomali Plain. The Takhar front extended from the Tajikistan border in the north to Parwan in the south, near Kabul. Dostum's forces were located south of Mazar-i-Sharif, the Hazaras under Muhammad Mohaqiq were in the central Hazarajat region, and Ismail Khan was near Herat.

The Taliban's military commander in the north was Mohammad Fazl. The Taliban military comprised approximately 45,000 Afghans and 2,700 foreign fighters, which included al-Qaeda's 055 Brigade. According to military analyst Ali Jalali, the 055 Brigade was only 400–600 strong, but its ties to bin Laden made it politically important. The foreign fighters included Arabs as well as Kashmiris, Chechens, Uzbeks, and Uyghurs. Several hundred officers from Pakistan's ISI were stationed in Afghanistan advising the Taliban. By mid-October, approximately 10,000 Pakistani volunteers crossed the border to augment the Taliban's forces. The volunteers were mostly madrasa students, some as young as 14.

Both sides primarily used Russian military equipment. The Northern Alliance had 14.5mm heavy machine guns, Russian artillery, T-72 tanks, and BMP-1 armored vehicles retrofitted with rocket pods from Soviet combat helicopters. Dostum's Uzbeks used horses for transportation. The Northern Alliance had 18 helicopters and three fixed-wing planes, used mostly for logistical purposes. The Taliban's equipment was similar to that of the Northern Alliance, and they also had Stinger missiles donated by the United States to the mujahidin during the Soviet–Afghan War. They relied on pickup trucks for mobility and operated as a "motorized light force." They had about 40 combat aircraft, operated by ex-PDPA pilots.

Both sides had a history of human rights abuses: Uzbeks and Hazaras had "massacred hundreds of Taliban prisoners and killed Pashtun villagers in the north and around Kabul", and the Taliban killed 5,000–8,000 civilians after they captured Mazar-i-Sharif in 1998. Afghanistan also faced a serious humanitarian crisis in 2001 due to drought; according to the United Nations, 5 million Afghans were in need of humanitarian aid that year and 3.8 million could not survive without UN food aid.

== Prelude to the invasion ==
On the morning of 11 September 2001, al-Qaeda carried out four coordinated attacks on the United States, employing four hijacked jet airliners. The attacks killed almost 3,000 people and injured more than 6,000 others. By the early afternoon of 11 September, the CIA had confirmed that al-Qaeda was responsible for the attacks. The Taliban condemned the attacks, but Umar issued a statement denying bin Laden's involvement. Although bin Laden eventually took responsibility for the 9/11 attacks in 2004, he initially denied having any involvement. One of bin Laden's strategic goals was to draw the US into a costly war in Afghanistan, so it could be defeated just as the USSR had been.

=== Diplomatic and political activity ===
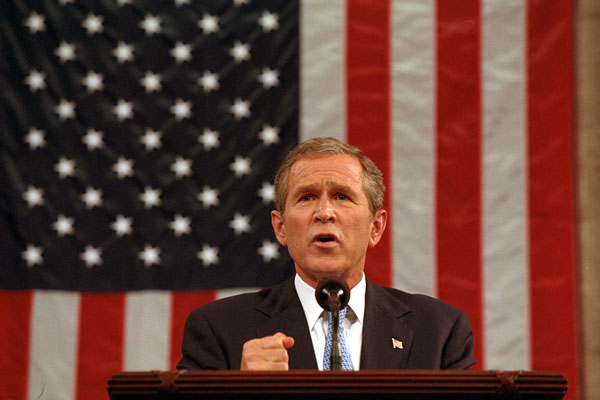
In an address to a joint session of the US Congress on 20 September 2001, US President George W. Bush demanded that the Taliban deliver Osama bin Laden and destroy bases of al-Qaeda.

On the evening of 11 September, President Bush stated the US would respond to the attacks and would "make no distinction between those who planned these acts and those who harbor them." On 14 September 2001, Congress passed legislation titled Authorization for Use of Military Force Against Terrorists, authorizing military force against al-Qaeda and its supporters. President Bush addressed Congress on 20 September and demanded the Taliban deliver bin Laden and al-Qaeda or face war.

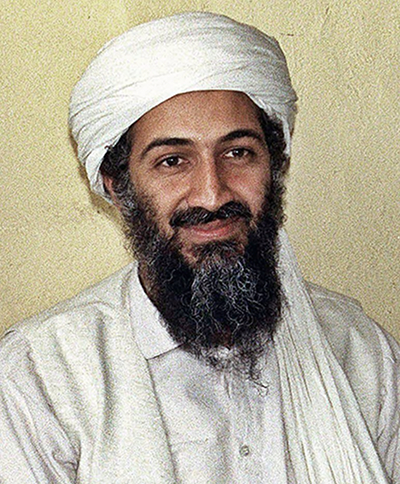
In the days and weeks immediately following 9/11, Osama bin Laden repeatedly denied having any role.

On the same day, a grand council of 300 or 700 Muslim clerics across Afghanistan, who had convened to decide bin Laden's fate, issued a fatwa recommending that the Islamic Emirate ask bin Laden to leave their country. The fatwa went on to warn that should the United States invade Afghanistan, jihad would become obligatory until the invaders were expelled. On 21 September, Muhammad Umar rejected both Bush's demands and the advice of the council, again denying that bin Laden was responsible for 9/11.

Simultaneously, the US urged Pakistan to end its support for the Taliban regime and to pressure Muhammad Umar to hand over bin Laden. On 12 September, the US demanded Pakistan close its border with the Taliban and share intelligence with the Bush administration. US pressure on Pakistan reportedly included an ultimatum that Pakistan declares itself either a friend or a foe and the threat to "turn Pakistan back to the stone age". Pakistani president Pervez Musharraf agreed and sent the ISI director-general to negotiate with the Taliban. Muhammad Umar told Pakistan that he would be willing to turn bin Laden over to a third country, but the US refused, demanding a direct handover.

Meanwhile, Umar authorized his deputy Akhtar Mohammad Osmani to negotiate with Robert Grenier, the CIA's chief of station in Pakistan, to discuss giving up bin Laden. The two met in Quetta on 15 September and 2 October. During the latter meeting, Grenier, aware that Osmani belonged to the moderate faction of the Taliban and disliked bin Laden, proposed that Osmani seize power in Afghanistan. He offered CIA assistance in the coup on the condition that Osmani would hand over bin Laden afterwards. Although Osmani initially showed some interest in the proposal, they ultimately failed to reach an agreement.

On 4 October, the British government released a document summarizing the evidence linking bin Laden to the attacks. That same day, the North Atlantic Treaty Organization (NATO) invoked Article V of the North Atlantic Treaty for the first time in its history; According to one senior British MoD official, the invoking of Article V seemed to have caught the Americans by surprise, and the Bush administration appeared annoyed at NATO's declaration. Article V states that an attack on one member of the alliance is to be considered an attack on all members. On 7 October, as the US aerial bombing campaign began, President Bush stated, "Full warning has been given, and time is running out."

=== Planning ===
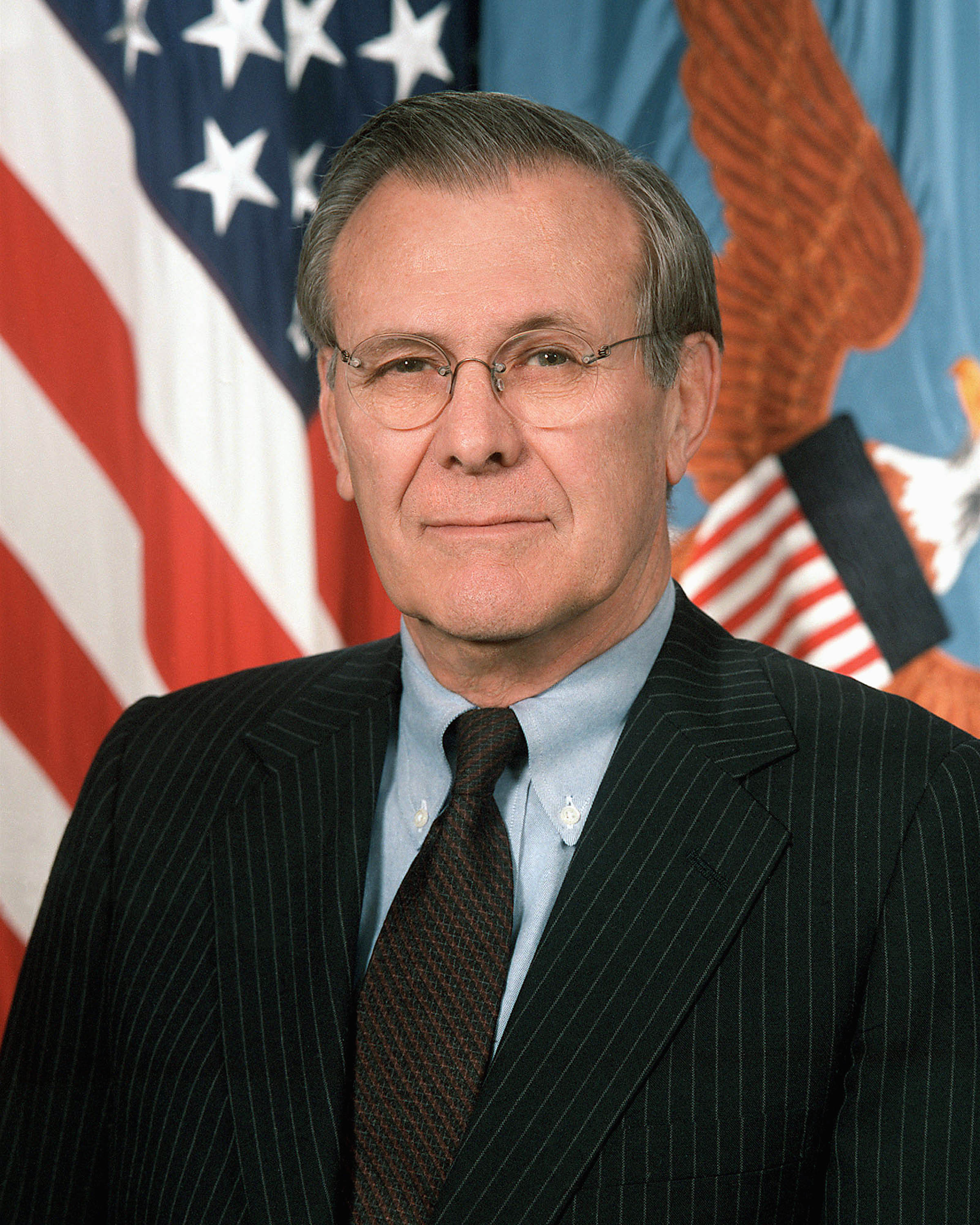
US Secretary of Defense Donald Rumsfeld

In 2001, the Defense Department did not have a pre-existing plan for an invasion of Afghanistan. Therefore, the plan approved by Bush was devised by the CIA, reusing elements of the agency's previous contingency plans for collaboration with the Northern Alliance against the Taliban. Bush met with his cabinet at Camp David on 15 September for a war planning session. The military presented three options for military action in Afghanistan: The first was a cruise missile strike, the second was a combined cruise missile and bombing campaign lasting 3–10 days, and the third called for cruise missile and bomber strikes as well as ground forces operating inside Afghanistan. The CIA also presented its war plan, which involved inserting paramilitary teams to work with the Northern Alliance and, eventually, American Special Forces units. The planners wanted to minimize the use of American ground forces, to avoid provoking the Afghan population as the British and Russians had done. On 17 September Bush approved the CIA's plan and directed the military to develop a detailed war plan based on the third option from Camp David. Planning efforts were hindered because the Taliban had little physical infrastructure for the military to target. Early plans by the Joint Special Operations Command (JSOC) included poisoning the Afghan food supply and raiding a fertilizer factory that JSOC believed could be used to make chemical weapons.

The military completed its war plan by 21 September and called it Operation Infinite Justice. This name was deemed culturally insensitive because Islamic theology only deems God's justice to be infinite, so Secretary of Defense Donald Rumsfeld changed the name to Operation Enduring Freedom.

The US aimed to destroy al-Qaeda and remove the Taliban regime from power, but also sought to prevent the Northern Alliance from taking control of Afghanistan, believing the Alliance's rule would alienate the country's Pashtun majority. CIA director George Tenet argued that the US should target al-Qaeda but "hold off on the Taliban," since the Taliban were popular in Pakistan and attacking them could jeopardize relations with Pakistan.

=== Humanitarian situation in Afghanistan ===
At the time of the invasion, the humanitarian situation in Afghanistan was dire, and the attacks in the United States caused thousands of Afghans to attempt to flee fearing potential U.S. military action - this on top of millions that were already refugees in regional countries due to the continuous conflict already in place for 22 years. Food stock was running critically low and almost all aid workers had left the country after the attacks. Barry Bearak in a New York Times article described Afghanistan as a "post-apocalyptic place of felled cities, parched land and downtrodden people." Seventy percent of the population was undernourished in 2001, and the life expectancy was ranked two places from bottom in the world.

Number of regional Afghan refugees by destination, as of September 2001
Pakistan	2,000,000
Iran	1,400,000
India, Tajikistan and Uzbekistan	30,000

Fox News suggested on 27 September that "millions" of Afghans would possibly starve, amid the paralyzed relief network, closed border crossings, and the cold winter approaching. The U.N. refugee agency feared that the scale of the crisis could reach the peaks of that in Bosnia and Rwanda.

== Overthrow of the Taliban ==
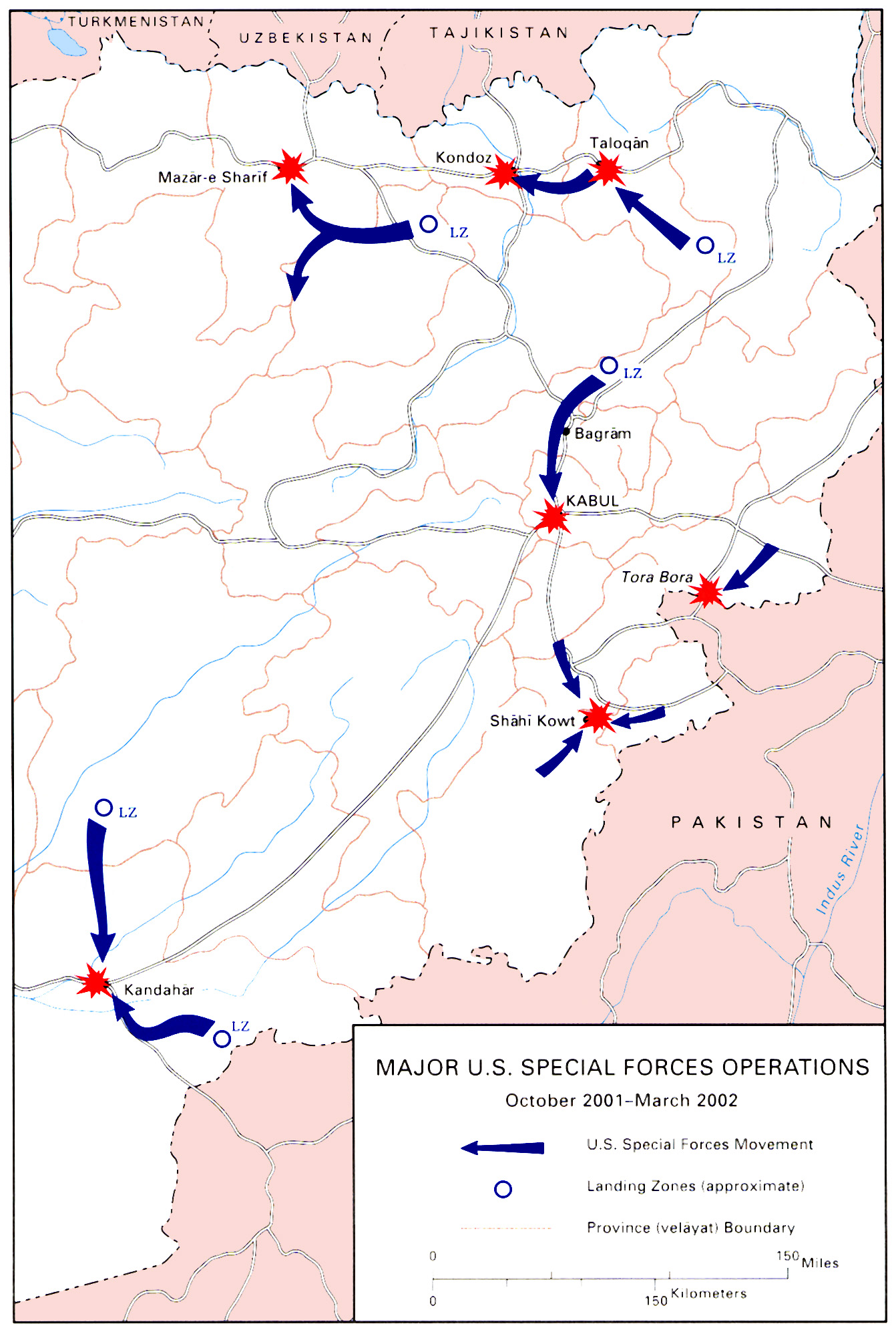
Major American special forces operations in Afghan territory between October 2001 and March 2002

=== Command structure ===
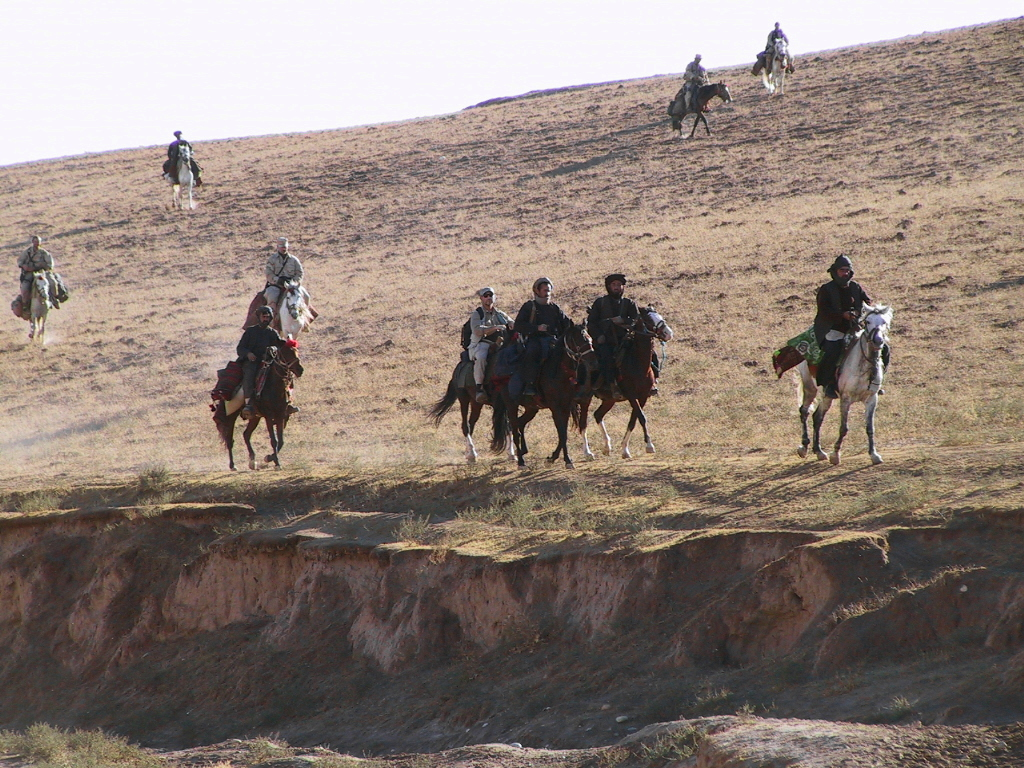
US Army Special Forces and US Air Force Combat Controllers with Northern Alliance troops on horseback

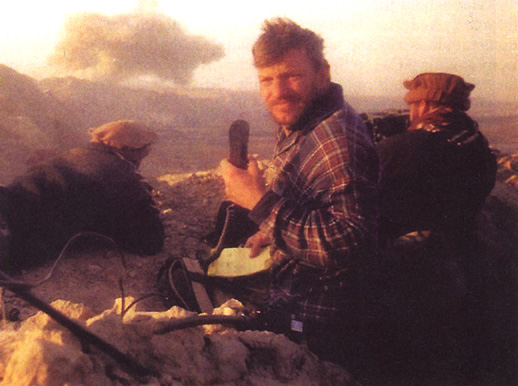
US Air Force Combat Controllers in combat during the invasion of Afghanistan, October 2001

The invasion consisted of American, British, Canadian, and Australian forces, with other countries providing logistical support. General Tommy Franks of US Central Command (CENTCOM) was the overall commander for Operation Enduring Freedom. He led four task forces: the Combined Joint Special Operations Task Force (CJSOTF), Combined Joint Task Force Mountain (CJTF-Mountain), the Joint Interagency Task Force-Counterterrorism (JIATF-CT), and the Coalition Joint Civil-Military Operations Task Force (CJCMOTF).

CJSOTF consisted of three subordinate task forces: Joint Special Operations Task Force-North (JSOTF-North or Task Force Dagger), Joint Special Operations Task Force-South (JSOTF-South or Task Force K-Bar) and Task Force Sword (later renamed Task Force 11). Task Force Dagger was led by Colonel John F. Mulholland, Jr. and was formed around his 5th Special Forces Group with helicopter support from the 160th Special Operations Aviation Regiment (160th SOAR). Dagger was assigned to the north of Afghanistan and Task Force K-Bar was assigned to southern Afghanistan. K-Bar was led by Navy SEAL Captain Robert Harward and formed around SEAL Teams 2, 3 and 8 and Green Berets from 1st Battalion, 3rd Special Forces Group. The task force principally conducted special reconnaissance and sensitive site exploitation missions. Most coalition contributions were arrayed under K-Bar, including New Zealand's Special Air Service, Canada's Joint Task Force 2, and Germany's Kommando Spezialkräfte. Task Force Sword was the Joint Special Operations Command (JSOC) component of the mission. Task Force Sword's primary objective was capturing or killing senior leadership within al-Qaeda and the Taliban. Sword was structured around a two-squadron component of operators from Delta Force and SEAL Team Six was supported by a Ranger force protection team, an Intelligence Support Activity (ISA) signals intercept and surveillance team, and the 160th SOAR. The British Special Boat Service was integrated directly into Sword's structure.

Alongside the SOF task forces operated the largely conventional CJTF-Mountain. Mountain initially comprised three subordinate commands, but only one was a special operations force – Task Force 64, a special forces task group built around a sabre squadron from the Australian SAS. The US Marines contributed Task Force 58, consisting of the 15th Marine Expeditionary Unit. The JIATF-CT (also known as Task Force Bowie), led by Brigadier General Gary Harrell, was an intelligence integration and fusion activity composed of personnel from all participating units. Bowie numbered 36 military personnel and 57 from agencies such as the FBI, NSA, and CIA, as well as liaison officers from coalition SOF. Administratively embedded within Bowie was Advanced Force Operations (AFO). AFO was a 45-man reconnaissance unit made up of Delta Force reconnaissance specialists augmented by selected SEALs and supported by ISA's technical experts. AFO had been raised to support TF Sword and was tasked with intelligence preparation of the battlefield, working closely with the CIA and reporting directly to TF Sword. AFO conducted covert reconnaissance along the border with Pakistan. The AFO operators deployed observation posts to watch and report enemy movements and numbers and conduct environmental reconnaissance. The final task force supporting the invasion was CJCMOTF, which would manage civil affairs and humanitarian efforts.

=== First move ===
On 26 September, fifteen days after 9/11, the US covertly inserted (via CIA-piloted Mi-17 helicopter) 10 (Note: The team was made up of seven field agents, two pilots, and a helicopter mechanic. Phil Reilly was the deputy team leader. Chris Wood was also on the team.) members of the CIA into the Panjshir Valley, Massoud's stronghold. The CIA mission was led by Gary Schroen and designated the Northern Afghanistan Liaison Team, known by the call-sign 'Jawbreaker'. In addition to specialized human assets, the team brought a metal case containing $3 million in $100 bills to buy support. Jawbreaker linked up with General Mohammed Fahim, commander of the Northern Alliance forces in the Panjshir Valley, and prepared the way for introduction of Army Special Forces. The Jawbreaker team brought satellite communications equipment, enabling its intelligence reports to be instantly available to CIA headquarters. The team also assessed potential targets for Operation Crescent Wind, provided in-extremis combat search and rescue (CSAR), and could provide bomb damage assessment for the air campaign. To allow fixed-wing aircraft to land in the area, the team refurbished an airstrip at Gulbahar built by the British in 1919.

On 28 September, British Foreign Secretary Jack Straw approved the deployment of MI6 officers to Afghanistan, utilizing people involved with the mujahidin in the 1980s, who had language skills and regional expertise. At month's end, a handful of MI6 officers landed in northeast Afghanistan and met with Fahim. They began working with other contacts in the north and south to build alliances, secure support, and bribe as many Taliban commanders as possible to change sides or leave the fight. Two more CIA teams soon arrived, operating near Herat and Mazar-i-Sharif.

On 5 October, Uzbekistan granted permission for US forces to operate from its territory. Within 48 hours, units from the 160th Special Operations Aviation Regiment arrived at the Karshi-Khanabad Air Base in Chinook and Blackhawk helicopters and made operational readiness just as the bombing campaign was commencing. The initial focus was to establish search-and-rescue capabilities and prepare for the deployment of special force A-teams into Afghanistan to support the Northern Alliance rebels.

=== Initial air strikes ===
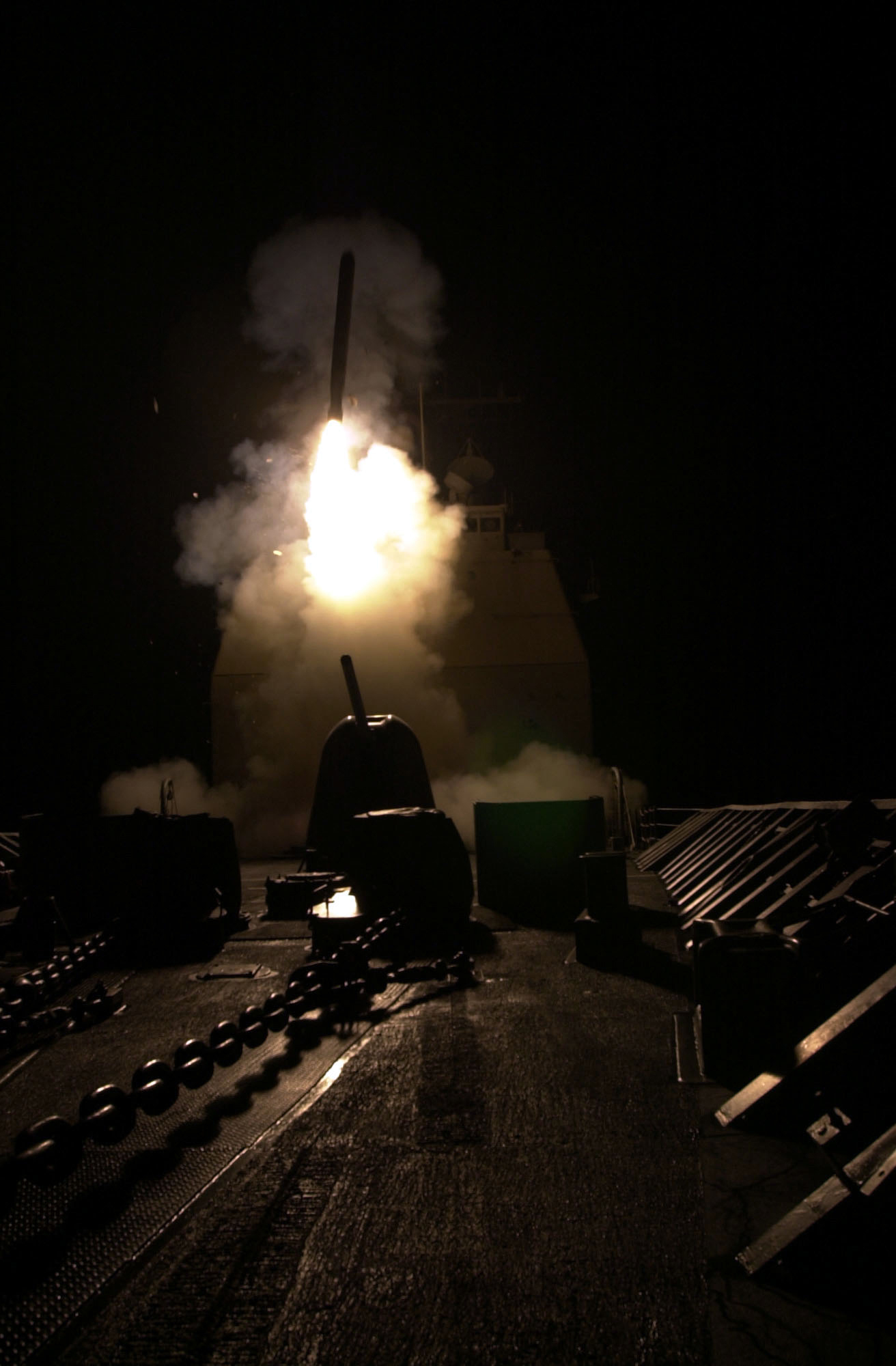
A Tomahawk cruise missile is launched from the USS Philippine Sea in a strike against al-Qaeda training camps and Taliban military installations in Afghanistan on 7 October 2001

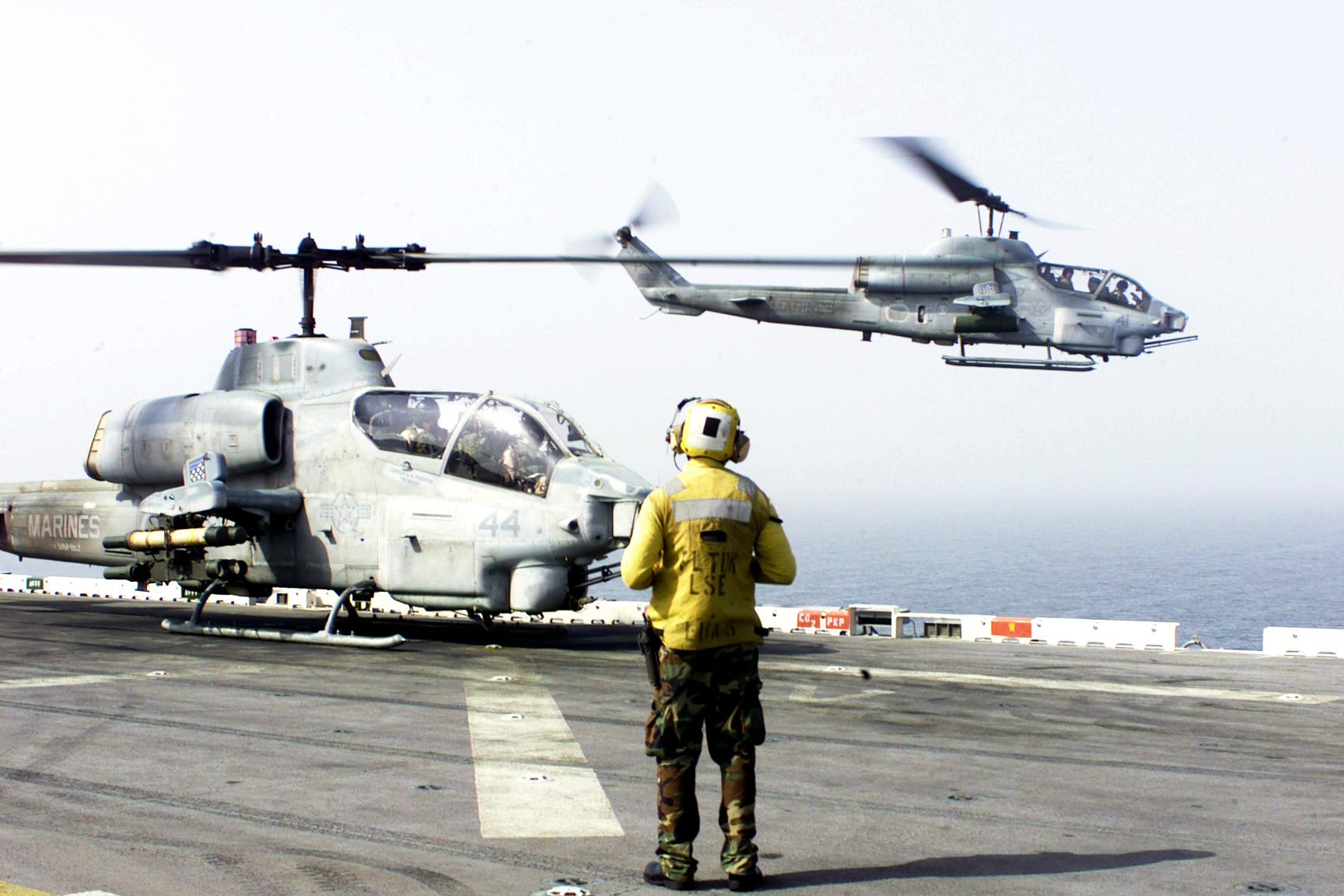
AH-1W "Super Cobra" helicopters take off from USS Peleliu in the North Arabian Sea on 13 October 2001

On 7 October, the US began military operations in Afghanistan with air strikes on 31 targets across the country. Most of the Taliban's outdated SA-2 and SA-3 surface-to-air missiles, small fleet of MIG-21s and Su-22s, and radar and command units were destroyed on the first night. On the same night the CIA conducted the first-ever air strike with a Predator drone. The Predator was loitering over Muhammad Umar's house and followed several men who left the house. CIA analysts believed that Umar was in the group, which drove first to the house of Umar's mother and then to a school west of Kandahar. The men stayed in the school for several hours and the CIA requested that the Air Force strike the school with a conventional bomb, but Franks denied the request, citing the risk of collateral damage and uncertainty over whether Umar was really there. The CIA fired the Predator's Hellfire missile at a truck outside to draw the men out; the men left the school, and Umar escaped. Predator drones had been in development since the early 1990s, had been used to search for bin Laden since 2000, and had even been proposed as a means of assassinating bin Laden before 9/11. The employment of armed Predators in Afghanistan marked the start of a new era of drone warfare.

US aircraft bombed Taliban training camps and air defenses over the next several days, employing Apache helicopter gunships from the 101st Combat Aviation Brigade. US Navy cruisers, destroyers and Royal Navy submarines launched several Tomahawk cruise missiles. Within a few days, most Taliban training sites were severely damaged and air defenses destroyed. The campaign focused on command, control, and communications targets. The front facing the Northern Alliance held, and no battlefield successes were achieved there. The United States dropped 1500 munitions in the first week of bombing. They also began airdropping food and medical supplies to civilians in Northern Alliance-controlled territory. By the second week of the campaign most of the preplanned targets had been destroyed.

On 19 October, Operational Detachment Alpha (ODA) teams 555 and 595, both 12-man Green Beret teams from the 5th Special Forces Group, plus Air Force Combat Controllers, were airlifted by helicopter from the Karshi-Khanabad Air Base in Uzbekistan more than 300 kilometers (190 mi) across the 16,000 feet (4,900 m) Hindu Kush mountains in zero-visibility conditions by MH-47E Chinook helicopters from 2nd Battalion 160th SOAR. ODA 555 went to the Panjshir Valley to link up with the NALT and Fahim, and ODA 595 went to the Darya Suf Valley, just south of Mazar-i-Sharif, to work with Dostum.

In mid-October, A and G squadron of the British 22nd SAS Regiment, reinforced by members of the Territorial SAS regiments, deployed to northwest Afghanistan in support of Enduring Freedom. They conducted largely uneventful reconnaissance under the code-name Operation Determine, none of which resulted in enemy contact. They traveled in Land Rover Desert Patrol Vehicles and modified all-terrain vehicles (ATVs). Both squadrons returned to their barracks in the UK after two weeks.

=== Operation Rhino and Objective Gecko ===
On the night of 19 October, simultaneous with the Special Forces entering the country, 200 Rangers from the 3rd Battalion, 75th Ranger Regiment, parachuted onto Objective Rhino—a landing strip south of Kandahar. The landing strip had been built as part of an Emirati hunting camp. Before the Rangers dropped, B-2 Spirit stealth bombers and AC-130 gunships bombed and strafed the site, with initial reports of eleven enemy killed and nine fleeing; upon reaching the ground the Rangers located and killed one Taliban fighter. The Rangers provided security while a forward arming and refuelling point (FARP) was established using fuel bladders from MC-130s, to refuel aircraft flying to the next objective. The mission was filmed by combat cameramen and a P-3C Orion observation plane flying overhead. No US casualties were suffered in the operation itself (two Rangers received minor injuries in the jump), but two Rangers assigned to a CSAR element supporting the mission were killed when their MH-60L helicopter crashed at a temporary staging site in Dalbandin, Pakistan, due to a brownout.

Simultaneously, a squadron of Delta Force operatives supported by Rangers from Task Force Sword conducted an operation—designated Objective Gecko—outside Kandahar at Muhammad Umar's residential compound. Four MH-47E helicopters took off from the USS Kitty Hawk (which was serving as a SOF base) in the Indian Ocean carrying 91 soldiers. The assault teams were drawn from Delta, while teams from the Rangers secured the perimeter and occupied blocking positions. Before the soldiers were inserted, the target area was softened by preparatory fire from AC-130s and MH-60L Direct Action Penetrators. The assaulters met no resistance and there was no sign of the Taliban leader, so they searched the target location for intelligence, while their helicopters refueled at the newly established FARP in Rhino. The next day, the Pentagon showed the video footage from Objective Rhino at a press conference and distributed it to news organizations. Intelligence prior to the missions had indicated that neither objective had any Taliban forces on it. According to former Delta Force operations officer Peter Blaber, the JSOC commander Dell Dailey "believed that if we raided empty targets in Afghanistan and filmed the raids for the world to see ... we would have some kind of morale-breaking effect on the enemy."

=== Continued air strikes ===
The Green Berets of ODA 595 split into two elements, Alpha and Bravo. Alpha rode on horseback with General Dostum to his headquarters to plan an assault on Mazar-i-Sharif. Bravo was tasked with clearing the Darya Suf Valley of Taliban and to travel into the Alma Tak Mountains to conduct reconnaissance. Dostum and General Atta Muhammad Nur had been fighting the Taliban in the Darya Suf Valley throughout the summer and had gradually lost ground. The valley ran north to south and Dostum had established his headquarters near the village of Dehi—60 miles south of Mazar-i-Sharif—because the rugged terrain prevented Taliban tanks from moving that far into the valley.

On 21 October, the Alpha element of ODA 595 guided in the first Joint Direct Attack Munition bomb from a B-52, impressing Dostum. As part of its operations, the Americans beamed in radio broadcasts in both Pashto and Dari calling al-Qaeda and the Taliban criminals and promising US$25 million to anyone who would provide information leading to bin Laden's whereabouts.

On 23 October, the anti-Taliban Pashtun leader Abdul Haq entered Afghanistan with about 20 supporters and tried to raise a revolt against the Taliban in Nangarhar. Haq was among the most famous commanders of the anti-Soviet jihad, during which he had been wounded sixteen times and lost a foot. The Taliban captured and executed him.

On 25 October, ODA 585 infiltrated an area near Kunduz to work alongside warlord Burillah Khan. The same night, three Delta Force operators flew into the Panjshir and began working with the CIA Jawbreaker team to plan an important hostage rescue mission. In early August 2001, the Taliban had imprisoned eight employees of a Christian aid organization named Shelter Now, on charges of proselytizing. Held in Kabul, the prisoners included two Americans, Heather Mercer and Dayna Curry. They faced the death penalty if convicted. Since their arrival in Afghanistan, the CIA team had been using Northern Alliance intermediaries to contact Taliban officials and attempted to bribe them to release the prisoners, without success. Delta Force specialized in hostage rescue and began planning to infiltrate Kabul with 50–60 operators, disguised as an al-Qaeda convoy, to extract the prisoners. Planning and rehearsal for the mission, which also included an element from Seal Team Six, continued for the next three weeks, but execution was delayed because the Taliban frequently moved the Shelter Now employees between two prisons in Kabul.

At the beginning of November, US aircraft shifted from attacking strategic targets to striking the Taliban front lines. On 2 November, ODA 553 inserted into Bamyan and linked up with General Karim Khalili's forces; ODA 534 was also inserted into the Balkh River Valley after being delayed by weather for several nights, near Dostum and ODA 595. Its role was to support General Atta in a drive on Mazar-i-Sharif, coordinated with Dostum. Bravo team of ODA 595 conducted airstrikes in the Darya Suf Valley, cutting off and destroying Taliban reinforcements and frustrating Taliban attempts to relieve their embattled forces in the north. Cumulatively, the near constant airstrikes had begun to have a decisive effect and the Taliban began to withdraw toward Mazar-i-Sharif. Dostum's forces and Alpha team of ODA 595 followed, working their way north through the valley. On 5 November, Dostum and Atta began a coordinated assault on the village of Baluch. Dostum prepared his men to follow a bombing run from a B-52 with a cavalry charge, but one of Dostum's lieutenants misunderstood an order and sent 400 Uzbek horsemen charging toward the Taliban lines as the bomber made its final approach. The bomb landed just in time on the Taliban positions and the cavalry charge succeeded in breaking the Taliban defenses. Dostum and Atta then entered the Balkh Valley and continued towards Mazar-i-Sharif.

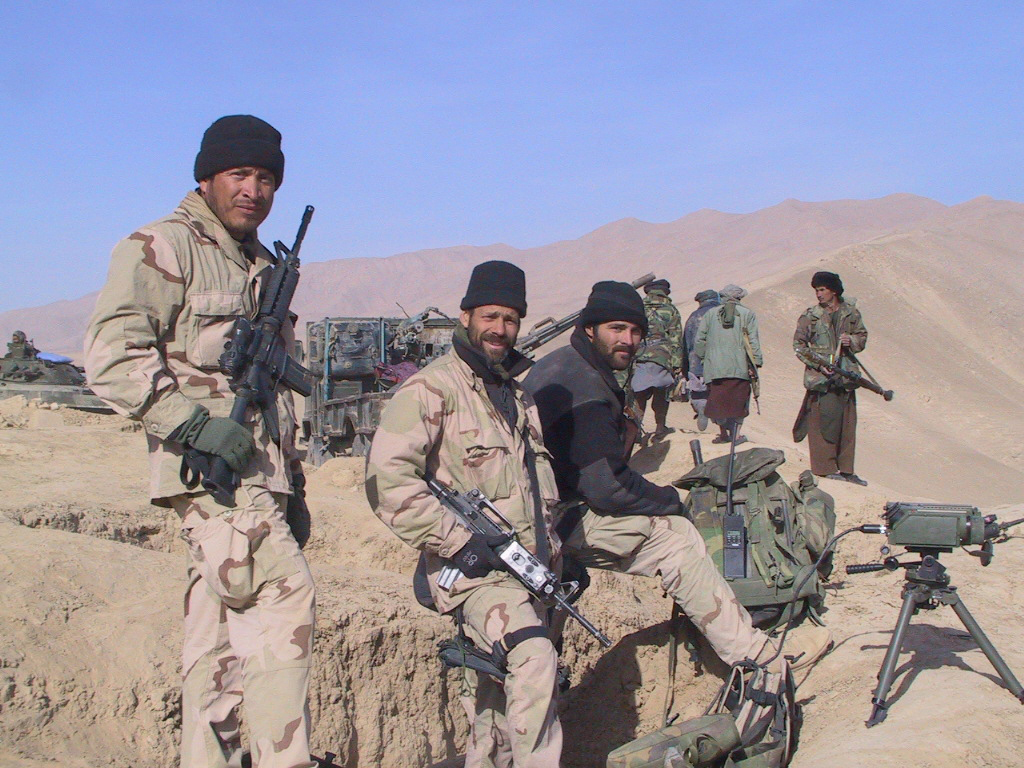
US Special Forces soldiers alongside Northern Alliance fighters west of Kunduz, November 2001

On the Shomali Plain, ODA 555 and the CIA Jawbreaker team attached to Fahim Khan's forces began calling airstrikes on entrenched Taliban positions at the southeastern end of the former Soviet air base at Bagram Airfield. The Green Berets set up an observation post in a disused air traffic control tower and guided in two BLU-82 Daisy Cutter bombs, which caused heavy Taliban casualties. On 8 November, ODAs 586 and 594 infiltrated into Afghanistan in MH-47s and picked up on the Afghan–Tajik border by CIA-flown MI-17s. ODA 586 deployed to Kunduz with the forces of General Daoud Khan and ODA 594 deployed into the Panjshir to assist the men of ODA 555. Among the individuals in ODA 594 was 71 year old Billy Waugh, who had tracked Osama bin Laden in Kartoum during the 1980s.

=== Fall of Mazar-i-Sharif ===
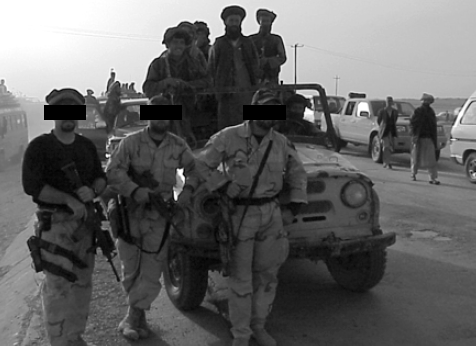
US Army Special Forces soldiers upon arriving in Mazar-i-Sharif with Northern Alliance fighters on 10 November

Mazar-i-Sharif was important as the home of the sacred Muslim site of the Shrine of Ali, and as a transportation hub, with two major airports and a bridge into Uzbekistan. Taking the city would enable humanitarian aid to alleviate a looming food crisis, which threatened more than six million people with starvation. Many of those in most urgent need lived in rural areas to the south and west of Mazar-i-Sharif. Dostum and Atta fought their way up the Balkh Valley and on 8 November reached the Tanghi Pass, the gateway between the valley and Mazar-i-Sharif. The pass was heavily defended, but the Northern Alliance seized it on 9 November, triggering a Taliban retreat from Mazar-i-Sharif. The Northern Alliance entered the city on 10 November.

The fall of the city was a "major shock"; the US Central Command originally believed it would remain in Taliban hands well into the following year. US Army Civil Affairs Teams from the 96th Civil Affairs Battalion, and Tactical Psychological Operations Teams from the 4th Psychological Operations Group, were immediately deployed to begin reconstruction in Mazar-i-Sharif.

On 10 November, operators from C squadron Special Boat Service, inserted via two C-130s into the recently captured Bagram Airfield, caused a political quandary with the Northern Alliance leadership, who claimed the British had failed to consult them on the deployment. The Northern Alliance foreign minister Abdullah Abdullah considered the uninvited arrival to be a violation of sovereignty, and complained to the head of the CIA field office, threatening to resign if the British did not withdraw. The British government had alerted the deputy head of the United Nations mission in Afghanistan that they were deploying troops to Bagram, albeit on short notice. Arriving on the first flight, Brigadier Graeme Lamb—the Director Special Forces at that time—simply ignored Abdullah and drove to the Panjshir Valley, where he paid his respects to Ahmad Shah Massoud's grave and held talks with Northern Alliance leaders. The British Foreign Secretary tried to reassure the Northern Alliance that the deployment was not a vanguard of a British peacekeeping army, but Northern Alliance leaders did not believe them; with the threat of the Northern Alliance opening fire on incoming troop transports, the deployment was put on hold.

On 11 November, in the central north of Afghanistan, ODA 586 was advising General Daod Khan outside the city of Taloqan and coordinating a batch of preparatory airstrikes, when Khan surprised the Americans by launching an impromptu mass infantry assault on the Taliban holding the city. The city fell before the first bomb could be dropped.

=== Fall of Kabul ===
On 12 November, the US tracked and killed al-Qaeda's number three, Muhammad Atif, with an air strike in Kabul. That day the Taliban abandoned Kabul and decided to regroup in Jalalabad and Kandahar. Taliban forces evacuated by the end of 13 November, and Northern Alliance forces (supported by ODA 555) arrived took control of the city the following afternoon. During their retreat, the Taliban took the Shelter Now prisoners with them, but abandoned them in a prison in Ghazni on 13 November. Anti-Taliban Afghans freed the prisoners, who had found a satellite phone and used it to call the American embassy in Pakistan. SEAL Team Six used Chinook helicopters to extract the prisoners from Ghazni on the night of 14 November and take them to Pakistan.

The fall of Kabul started a cascading collapse of Taliban positions. Within 24 hours, all Afghan provinces along the Iranian border had fallen, including Herat. Local Pashtun commanders and warlords had taken over throughout northeastern Afghanistan, including Jalalabad; Taliban holdouts in the north fell back to the city of Kunduz, while others retreated to their heartland in southeastern Afghanistan, around Kandahar.

In the midst of the retreat, Delta Force conducted a high-altitude, low-opening (HALO) jump northeast of Kandahar to call in airstrikes on targets retreating from Kabul, the first combat HALO jump conducted at night by the United States since the Vietnam War. By 13 November, al-Qaeda and Taliban forces—possibly including bin Laden—were concentrating in Tora Bora, 50 kilometres (31 mi) southwest of Jalalabad. Nearly 2,000 al-Qaeda and Taliban fighters fortified themselves within bunkers and caves. On 16 November, the US began bombing the mountain redoubt. Around the same time, CIA and Special Forces operatives worked in the area, enlisting local warlords and planning an attack.

=== Objective Wolverine, Objective Raptor, and Operation Relentless Strike ===
On 13 November, the 75th Ranger Regiment carried out its second combat parachute drop into Afghanistan. A platoon-sized Ranger security element, including a team from the Ranger Reconnaissance Detachment and accompanied by eight Air Force Special Tactical operators, parachuted into a dry lake bed southwest of Kandahar and secured the area. A pair of MC-130 cargo planes then landed in the lake bed and deposited four AH-6J Little Bird helicopters from the 160th SOAR. The Little Birds flew to a Taliban compound near Kandahar codenamed Objective Wolverine and destroyed it. They returned to the lake bed to rearm and refuel, then launched another strike against a second site called Objective Raptor. After the second strike they went back to the lake bed, loaded onto the MC-130s and flew back to Oman. A series of missions codenamed Operation Relentless Strike began on 16 November. On the first night, the Rangers drove modified HMMWVs and Land Rovers to secure a remote desert airstrip. The Little Birds then flew in on MC-130s and conducted a search and destroy mission along Highway 1. The Little Birds conducted similar search and destroy missions over the next several nights.

=== Battle of Tarinkot ===
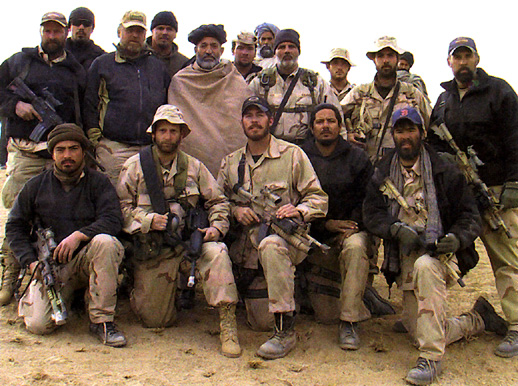
US Army Special Forces (ODA 574) with Hamid Karzai in Kandahar province

On 14 November, ODA 574 and Hamid Karzai inserted into Uruzgan Province via 4 MH-60K helicopters with a small force of guerrillas. Karzai was the leader of the Pashtun Popalzai tribe and had been an enemy of the Taliban since they assassinated his father in 1999. He had entered Afghanistan with three other men on 9 October, but was almost killed by the Taliban, and was extracted by the CIA on 4 November. Once he returned he began to move towards the town of Tarinkot. Responding to the approach of Karzai's forces, the inhabitants of the town of Tarinkot revolted and expelled their Taliban administrators. Karzai traveled to Tarinkot to meet with the town elders. While he was there, the Taliban marshaled a force of 300–500 men to retake the town. Karzai's small force, plus the American contingent, deployed in the town's front to block the Taliban's advance. Relying heavily on close air support, the American and Afghan force managed to drive the Taliban away from the town.

The defeat of the Taliban at Tarinkot was an important victory for Karzai, who used it to recruit more men to his fledgling guerrilla band. His force would grow in size to a peak of around 800 men. Soon afterwards, they left Tarinkot and began advancing on Kandahar.

=== Siege of Kunduz and alleged Pakistani airlift ===
Task Force Dagger's attention focused on the last northern Taliban stronghold, Kunduz. As the bombardment at Tora Bora grew, the Siege of Kunduz continued. General Daoud and ODA 586 had initiated massive coalition airstrikes to demoralize the Taliban defenders. After 11 days of fighting and bombardment, Taliban fighters surrendered to Northern Alliance forces on 23 November. Shortly before the surrender, Pakistani aircraft arrived to evacuate intelligence and military personnel who had been aiding the Taliban's fight against the Northern Alliance, including Taliban and al-Qaeda leaders. The details of the airlift are disputed. Investigative reporter Seymour Hersh alleged that up to five thousand people were evacuated, while Karzai stated that, "even the Americans did not know who got away." The United States government denied that the airlift occurred, with Secretary Rumsfeld saying, "neither Pakistan nor any other country flew any planes into Afghanistan to evacuate anybody."

=== Operation Trent ===
The British Special Air Service (SAS) played a small role in the early stages of the war because American SOF commanders guarded targets for their own units. It took political intercession from Prime Minister Tony Blair for the SAS to be given a direct-action task – the destruction of an al-Qaeda-linked opium production facility. The facility was located 400 km (250 mi) southwest of Kandahar and defended by between 80 and 100 foreign fighters, with a defense of trench lines and several makeshift bunkers. The SAS were ordered to assault the facility in full daylight because CENTCOM would not provide air support for a night raid. The timing meant that the squadrons could not carry out a detailed reconnaissance prior to the assault. Despite these factors, the commanding officer of 22 SAS accepted the mission. The target was a low priority for the US and probably would have been destroyed from the air if the British had not argued for a larger role in Afghanistan.

The mission began in November 2001, with an 8-man patrol from G Squadron's Air Troop performing the regiments first wartime HALO parachute jump. The patrol landed at a desert location in Registan to assess its suitability as an improvised airstrip for the landing of the main assault force in C-130 Hercules cargo aircraft. The Air Troop advance team confirmed the site was suitable and later that day the C-130s landed and disembarked the SAS in their vehicles. The assault force was composed of operators from A and G Squadrons driving 38 Land Rover Desert Patrol Vehicles, two logistics vehicles, and eight Kawasaki dirt bikes. The assault force drove to a release point and split into two elements. A squadron was the assault force and G Squadron provided fire support.

The assault began with a preparatory airstrike, after which A Squadron dismounted from their vehicles and closed in on the target on foot. G Squadron provided covering fire with heavy weapons, and air support flew sorties until running out of munitions. On a final pass, a US Navy F-18 Hornet strafed a bunker with its 20mm cannon, which narrowly missed several members of G Squadron. When the A Squadron assault force reached the objective, they cleared the HQ building and gathered all intelligence materials they could find. The mission lasted four hours and four SAS operators were wounded; the operation was the largest British SAS operation in history.

=== Battle of Qala-i-Jangi ===
On 25 November, as Taliban prisoners were moved into Qala-i-Jangi fortress near Mazar-i-Sharif, a few Taliban attacked their Northern Alliance guards. This incident triggered a revolt by 600 prisoners, who soon seized the southern half of the fortress, including an armory stocked with AKMs, RPGs and crew-served weapons. Johnny Micheal Spann, one of two CIA SAD operatives at the fortress who had been interrogating prisoners, was killed, marking America's first combat death.

The other CIA operator, Dave Olson, made contact with CENTCOM, which relayed his request for assistance to SOF troops at a TF Dagger safe house in Mazar-i-Sharif. The safe house housed members of Delta Force, some Green Berets and a small team from M squadron SBS. A quick reaction force was immediately formed from whoever was in the safe house at the time: a headquarters element from 3rd Battalion, 5th SFG, a pair of USAF liaison officers, a handful of CIA SAD operators and the SBS team. The 8-man SBS team arrived in Land Rovers and the Green Berets and CIA operatives arrived in minivans and began engaging the prisoners, fighting a pitched battle to suppress the uprising, letting Olson escape. The operators then turned their attention to recovering Spann's body. Over four days the battle continued, with Green Berets calling in multiple airstrikes on the Taliban prisoners. During one CAS mission a Joint Direct Attack Munition was misdirected and hit the ground close to the Coalition and Northern Alliance positions, wounding five Green Berets and four SBS operators.

AC-130 gunships kept up aerial bombardments throughout the night. The following day (27 November) the siege was broken when Northern Alliance T-55 tanks were brought into the central courtyard to fire shells into several block houses containing Taliban fighters. Fighting continued sporadically throughout the week, and the Taliban were finished by Dostum's Northern Alliance forces. The combined Green Beret–SBS team recovered Spann's body on 26 November.

The revolt ended on 1 December after seven days of fighting. 86 Taliban survived out of 1,000 that had been in the prison, and around 50 Northern Alliance soldiers were killed.

=== Consolidation: the fall of Kandahar ===
ODA 574 and Hamid Karzai began moving on Kandahar, gathering fighters from friendly local Pashtun tribes. At the strategic Sayd-Aum-Kalay Bridge they fought for two days with the Taliban, eventually seizing it with the help of US airpower, opening the road to Kandahar.

ODA 583 had infiltrated the Shin-Narai Valley southeast of Kandahar to support Gul Agha Sherzai, the former governor of Kandahar. The ODA established covert observation posts by 24 November, allowing them to call in fire on Taliban positions. By the end of November, Kandahar was the Taliban's last stronghold, and was coming under increasing pressure. Nearly 3,000 tribal fighters under Karzai and 350 under Sherzai pressured Taliban forces from the east and cut off northern supply lines to Kandahar.

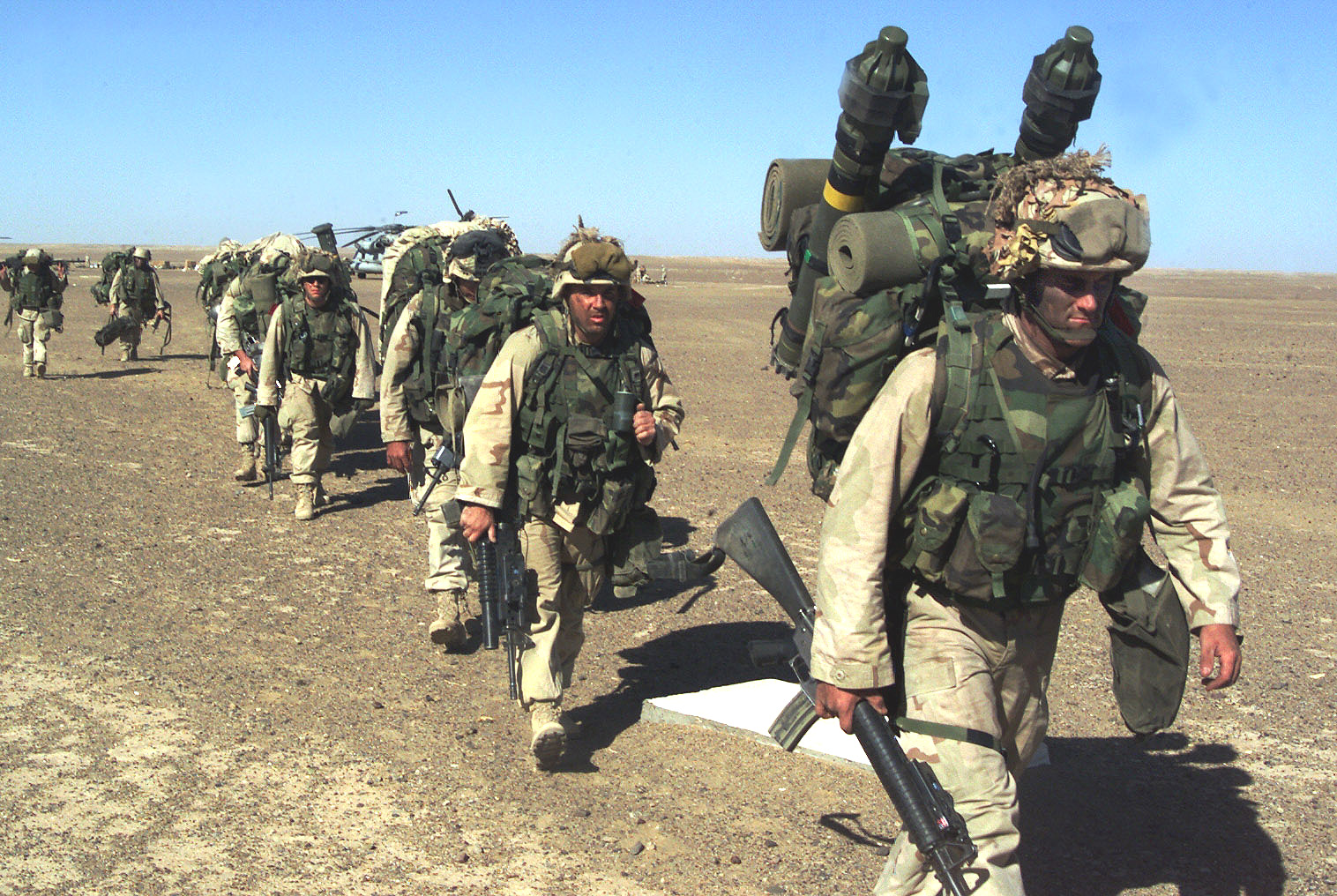
Marines of the 15th Marine Expeditionary Unit march to a security position after seizing Camp Rhino from the Taliban, 25 November 2001

Meanwhile, nearly 1,000 US Marines ferried in by CH-53E Super Stallion helicopters and C-130s set up a Forward Operating Base known as Camp Rhino in the desert south of Kandahar on 25 November (Camp Rhino was located at Objective Rhino, the same airstrip seized by the Rangers on 19 October). On 26 November, 15 Taliban armored vehicles approached the base and were attacked by helicopter gunships, destroying many of them.

On 5 December, a 2,000-pound (910 kg) GPS-guided bomb landed among the Green Berets from ODA 574, killing 3 members and wounding the rest of the team. Over 20 of Karzai's militia were also killed and Karzai himself was slightly wounded. A Delta Force unit that had been operating nearby on a classified reconnaissance mission arrived in their Pinzgauers and secured the site, while Delta medics treated the wounded Green Berets.

On 6 December, Karzai was informed that he would be the next president of Afghanistan. He also negotiated the successful surrender of both the remaining Taliban forces and the city of Kandahar. Karzai's militia began their final push to clear the city. The US government rejected amnesty for Umar or any Taliban leaders. On 7 December, Sherzai's forces seized Kandahar airport and moved into the city. Umar departed Kandahar and disappeared; he may have gone to Zabul, Helmand, or Pakistan. Other Taliban leaders fled to Pakistan through the remote passes of Paktia and Paktika.

In early December, as the US invasion was almost over, 7,500 Taliban prisoners were transported from Kunduz to Sheberghan prison by Junbish-i Milli, a group led by Dostum. Hundreds to 2,000 of the Taliban prisoners suffocated in the overcrowded metal shipping containers on trucks or were shot dead in an incident known as the Dasht-i-Leili massacre. Some were killed when guards shot air holes into the containers. The dead were buried in the Dasht-i-Leili desert just west of Sheberghan, in the Jowzjan Province. Physicians for Human Rights discovered the mass grave in 2002, but the Bush administration discouraged attempts to investigate the incident.

=== Battle of Tora Bora: Osama bin Laden escapes to Pakistan ===
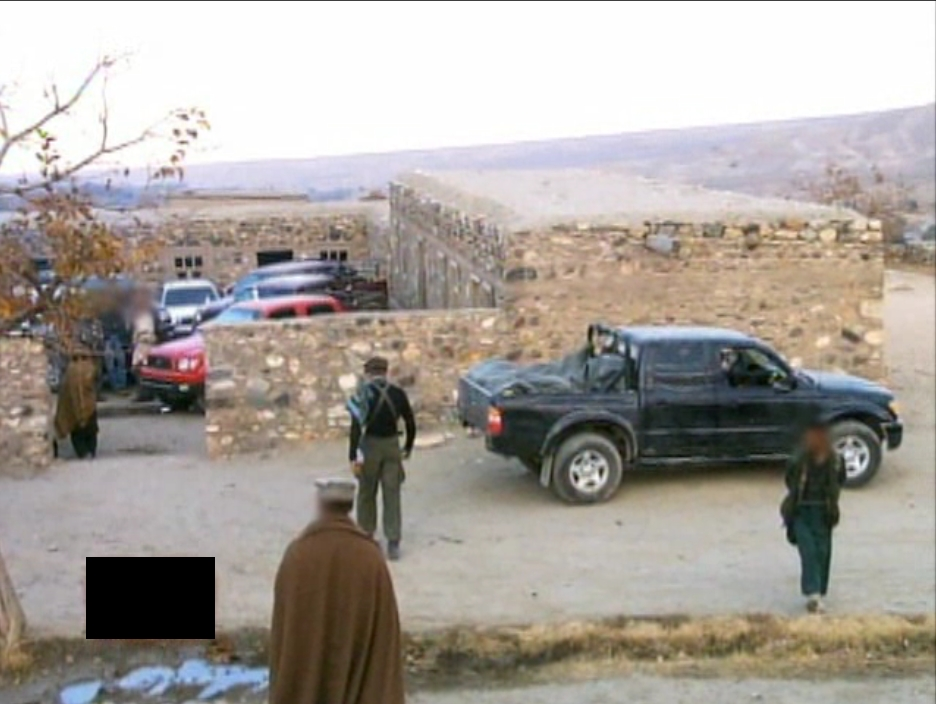
US Army Special Forces headquarters in Nangarhar Province, November 2001

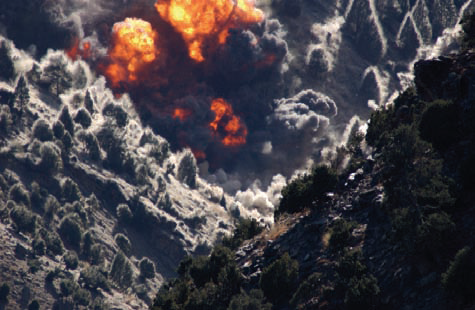
Air strikes on Tora Bora

After the fall of Kabul and Kandahar, suspected al-Qaeda members, including bin Laden and other key leaders, withdrew to Jalalabad, Nangarhar Province. From there they moved into the Tora Bora region of the Spin Ghar (White Mountains), 20 km away from the Pakistan border, which had a network of caves and prepared defenses used by the mujahidin during the Soviet–Afghan War. Signal intercepts and interrogation of captured Taliban fighters and al-Qaeda terrorists pointed towards the presence of significant numbers of foreign fighters and possible senior leaders in the area. Instead of committing conventional forces, the White House and the Pentagon decided to isolate and destroy al-Qaeda elements in the area with the US SOF supporting locally recruited Afghan militias, due to a fear of repeating the Soviet's experience in the area.

ODA 572 and a CIA team were dispatched to Tora Bora to advise eastern anti-Taliban militias under the command of two warlords: Hazrat Ali and Mohammed Zaman. Hazrat Ali and Zaman distrusted each other, and during the battle their militias sometimes shot at each other. Using CIA funds, some 1,000 Afghan fighters were recruited for the coming battle. The leader of the CIA team was Gary Berntsen, who in November had replaced Gary Schroen as the senior CIA officer in Afghanistan. On 2 December, Berntsen requested a battalion of Rangers be dropped into the mountains to establish blocking positions along potential escape routes out of Tora Bora into Pakistan. In addition to the Rangers, other available forces included 1,000 Marines under Brigadier General Jim Mattis in Kandahar and soldiers from the 10th Mountain Division in Uzbekistan. Franks denied Berntsen's request.

From the outset of the battle, ODA 572 with its attached Combat Controller called in precision airstrikes, whilst the Afghans launched a number of poorly executed attacks on established al-Qaeda positions, with limited success. The militias would typically gain ground in the morning following US airstrikes, but relinquish control of those gains the same day. They would also retreat to their base areas to sleep and break their fast each night, since the battle occurred during Ramadan, the month when Muslims do not eat or drink during the day. With the Afghan offensive stalled and the CIA and ODA teams overstretched, Franks decided to deploy special operations soldiers from JSOC into the battle on 9 December.

Forty operators from A Squadron Delta Force deployed forward to Tora Bora and assumed tactical command from the CIA. With the Delta squadron were a dozen of so members of the British SBS. The Delta operators were deployed in small teams embedded within the militias and sent their own operators out to search for bin Laden. Eventually, with the assistance of Green Berets and CIA operators, the militias made progress. The Delta squadron commander agreed with the Jawbreaker assessment of the situation and requested blocking forces or the scattering of aerial landmines to deny mountain passes to the enemy. Since the deployment of the Ranger battalion had been denied, he requested that his operators carryout the proposed role but all his requests were denied by General Franks. On 12 December, two weeks into the battle, Zaman opened negotiations with the trapped al-Qaeda and Taliban in Tora Bora. Against the wishes of the Americans and British, Zaman called a temporary truce to allow al-Qaeda to surrender. This truce was a ruse to allow as many as several hundred al-Qaeda and members of the 055 Brigade to escape over night toward Pakistan. According to journalist Peter Bergen, bin Laden left Tora Bora on the night of 12 December and went to Kunar Province.

The following day, a handheld radio recovered from a dead al-Qaeda fighter allowed members of the Delta squadron, SBS, CIA, and MI6 to hear bin Laden's voice – apparently apologizing to his followers for leading them to Tora Bora and giving his blessing for their surrender – thought to be a recording addressed to the fighters that stayed to fight a rearguard action to allow bin Laden to escape. The leader of the CIA Jawbreaker team at Tora Bora believed that two large al-Qaeda groups escaped: the smaller group of 130 jihadis escaped east into Pakistan, while the second group including bin Laden and 200 Saudi and Yemeni jihadis took the route across the mountains to Parachinar, Pakistan. The Delta squadron commander believed that bin Laden crossed the border into Pakistan sometime around 16 December. A Delta reconnaissance team, call-sign 'Jackal', spotted a tall man wearing a camouflage jacket with a large number of fighters entering a cave. The team called in multiple airstrikes on the presumption that it was bin Laden, but later DNA analysis from the remains did not match bin Laden's. With the majority of the enemy gone, the battle came to an end on 17 December.

On 20 December, ODA 561 was inserted into the White Mountains to support ODA 572 in gathering intelligence in the caves and to assist with recovering DNA samples from al-Qaeda bodies. US and UK forces continued searching into January, but no sign of al-Qaeda leadership emerged. An estimated 220 al-Qaeda fighters were killed during the battle and 52 prisoners were taken. No American or British personnel were killed.

In subsequent years, the military was heavily criticized for not deploying ground forces into Tora Bora to capture bin Laden. According to journalist Sean Naylor, Franks opposed the idea because he was "obsessed with not repeating the Soviets' mistake of deploying large conventional formations into Afghanistan," believing it would provoke popular resistance. Another possible explanation is that his attention was elsewhere – Franks spent 12 December, the day bin Laden may have escaped, briefing Secretary Rumsfeld on his plan for invading Iraq. There were also logistical obstacles: airlift assets in Afghanistan were limited, so transporting a large ground force to the Spin Ghar and resupplying it was "essentially impossible," according to an official Army history. Mattis, however, developed a plan that he thought logistically feasible – to drop artillery observers on the mountain passes with five days of sustainment to reduce resupply requirements.

=== Inter-Afghan political settlement ===
In late November 2001, the United Nations hosted the Bonn Conference; the Taliban were excluded, while three Afghan opposition groups participated. Observers included representatives of neighboring and other involved major countries. The resulting Bonn Agreement created the Afghan Interim Authority and outlined the Bonn Process that would lead towards a new constitution and a new Afghan government. Following the Bonn Conference, tribal leaders and former exiles established an interim government in Kabul under Hamid Karzai.

== Casualties and war crimes ==
The Costs of War Project at Brown University estimated that between 1,537 and 2,375 civilians were killed during the invasion. Northern Alliance combat fatalities are believed to be less than 600. United States casualties were 12 military personnel and one CIA officer (Mike Spann), while the Taliban suffered 8,000 to 12,000 killed. According to Human Rights Watch, during the invasion the Northern Alliance "carried out systematic attacks on Pashtun villages, raping women, summarily executing civilians, and stealing livestock and land."

== Logistics ==
A landlocked country with forbidding terrain and a harsh climate, Afghanistan presents major difficulties for military operations. Prior to the war, the United States had no military bases in Central or South Asia. The initial CIA Jawbreaker team entered Afghanistan by helicopter from Tashkent, Uzbekistan, stopping to refuel in Dushanbe, Tajikistan. The US established its main base at Karshi-Khanabad Air Base (known as K2) in Uzbekistan. Personnel and equipment were flown from the large American bases in Germany to K2 and then to Afghanistan. Pakistan granted the use of Shahbaz Air Base in Jacobabad as an auxiliary base, and the CIA flew Predator drones from both Jacobabad and Shamsi Airfield. Masirah Island off the coast of Oman served as the headquarters of Joint Special Operations Command, while the aircraft carrier USS Kitty Hawk in the Indian Ocean was used as a platform for helicopters of the 160th Special Operations Aviation Regiment to fly special operations personnel into southern Afghanistan. Some B-52 bombers flew into Afghanistan from the island of Diego Garcia, and B-2 bombers flew nonstop from Whiteman Air Force Base, Missouri to Afghanistan.

== Analysis ==
According to historian Carter Malkasian, the campaign was a "striking military success". The United States achieved its war aims while committing a force of only 110 CIA officers, 350 special operators, and 5,000 Rangers and Marines. The model of special forces working with local fighters and calling in precision air strikes was heavily used by the US during later operations in Afghanistan, Iraq, and Syria. One explanation for the rapid victory is that in Afghan culture, fighters tend to defect to the winning side once its victory is seen as inevitable; as anthropologist Thomas Barfield puts it, "Just as the Taliban had come to power by persuading people that they were winners without fighting and buying the defection of wavering commanders with suitcases full of hundred-dollar bills, they lost the war in a reverse process." The pattern recurred during the 2021 Taliban offensive, when the US-backed government collapsed and a resurgent Taliban captured a dozen provincial capitals in a week before it entered Kabul unopposed.

== Legality and international law ==
Scholars have disputed the legality of the invasion under international law. The US and its allies argued that the invasion was an act of self defense, which is legal according to Article 51 of the Charter of the United Nations. The US sent a letter to the Security Council on 7 October stating that, "Afghanistan was harboring terrorists who attacked the United States, that further attacks might be anticipated, and that military action was needed to deter them." Legal scholar John Quigley has argued that the invasion was illegal because al-Qaeda, not Afghanistan, was the perpetrator of the 9/11 attacks, and because there was no evidence that further terrorist attacks were imminent. Sean Murphy made the opposite case, that Afghanistan was responsible for the actions of al-Qaeda because it allowed al-Qaeda to operate from its territory and refused to extradite al-Qaeda operatives. The debate continued with the 2009 publication of Myra Williamson's Terrorism, War and International Law: The Legality of the Use of Force Against Afghanistan in 2001. Williamson analyzed the legal questions raised by state responses to terrorism and the implications of the Afghanistan precedent for later conflicts such as the 2003 United States invasion of Iraq and the 2006 Israeli invasion of Lebanon.

== Reactions and aftermath ==
In October 2001 when the invasion began, polls indicated that about 88% of Americans and about 65% of Britons backed military action. An Ipsos-Reid poll conducted between November and December 2001 showed that majorities in Canada (66%), France (60%), Germany (60%), Italy (58%), and the UK (65%) approved of US airstrikes while majorities in Argentina (77%), China (52%), South Korea (50%), Spain (52%), and Turkey (70%) opposed them. There were a number of protests against the invasion, including 20,000 people in Washington, D.C., on 29 September and 20,000 people in London on 7 October. In Afghanistan, according to anthropologist Thomas Barfield, there was "a surprising level of popular support...for the US intervention, especially among non-Pashtuns." In November 2001, CNN reported widespread relief amongst Kabul's residents after the Taliban fled the city, with young men shaving their beards and women taking off their burqas.

On 20 December 2001, the UN authorized an International Security Assistance Force (ISAF), with a mandate to help the Afghans maintain security in Kabul and surrounding areas. For its first years ISAF consisted of 8,000 American and 5,000 coalition soldiers and its mandate did not extend beyond the Kabul area. In February 2002, the US detected a large concentration of Taliban and al-Qaeda fighters in the eastern Shah-i-Kot Valley. Coalition forces cleared the valley during Operation Anaconda in March 2002, which resulted in 8 US soldiers killed and 80 wounded.

US forces established their main base at Bagram airbase just north of Kabul. Kandahar airport also became an important US base, and outposts were established in eastern provinces to hunt for Taliban and al-Qaeda fugitives. Following Operation Anaconda, al-Qaeda and Taliban fighters established sanctuaries on the Pakistani border, where they launched cross-border raids beginning in April 2002.

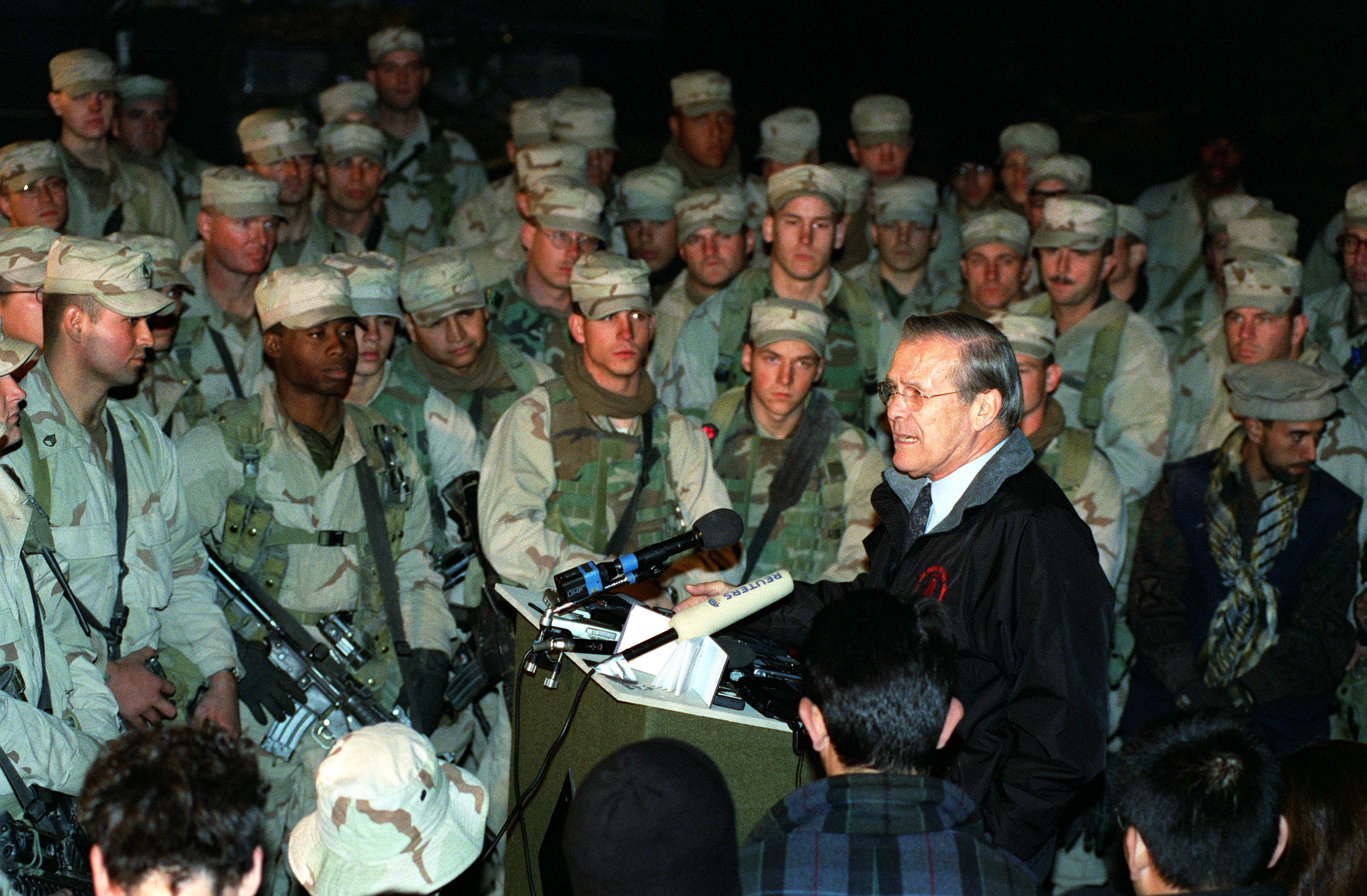
US Secretary of Defense Donald Rumsfeld with troops at Bagram Air Base, December 2001

US Secretary of Defense Donald Rumsfeld aimed to carry out operations in Afghanistan rapidly and leave as fast as possible. He thus wished to focus on kinetic counter-terrorism operations and building up a new Afghan Army. Rumsfeld announced in mid-2002 that "The war is over in Afghanistan," to the disbelief of State Department, CIA, and military officials in the country. As a result, Rumsfeld downplayed the need for an Afghan army of even 70,000 troops, far fewer than the 250,000 envisaged by Karzai. In February 2002, the National Security Council met to decide whether to expand ISAF beyond Kabul. In a dispute between Secretary of State Colin Powell and Rumsfeld, Rumsfeld's view—that the force should not be expanded—prevailed. Historians later wrote that the failure of ISAF to be deployed beyond Kabul drove Karzai to offer positions within the state to potential spoilers whose activities did great harm to the state's reputation. The rise of the Taliban insurgency was linked to grievances over governance.

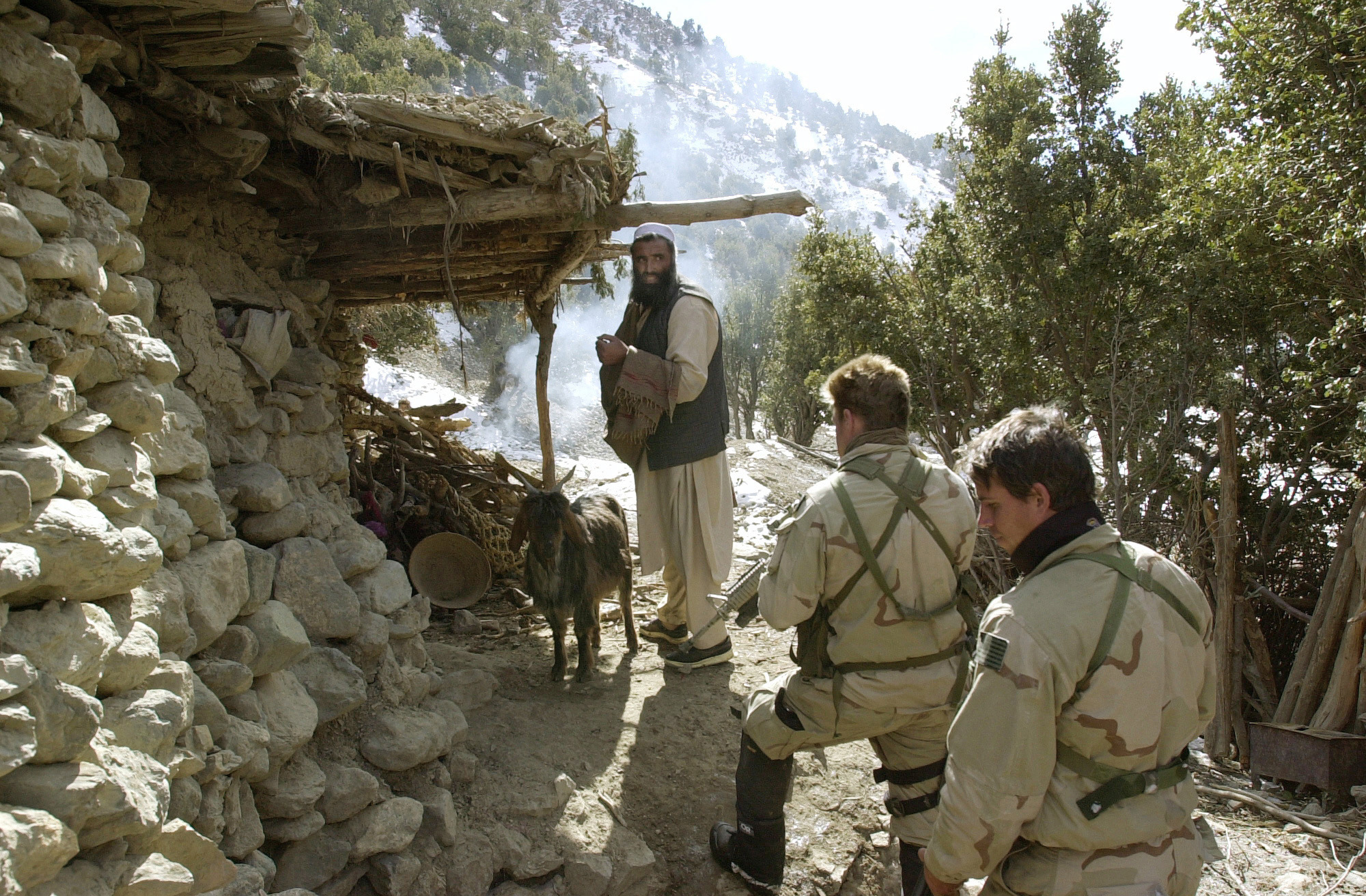
US Navy SEALs of Task Force K-Bar conducting sensitive site exploitation in the Jaji Mountains, 12 January 2002

Several events in early 2002 can be seen as the conclusion of the first phase of the US-led war in Afghanistan. The first was the dispersal of the major groups of the Taliban and al-Qaeda after the end of Anaconda. In February 2002, the United States decided to not expand international security forces beyond Kabul. President Bush spoke at the Virginia Military Institute on 17 April 2002, invoking General George Marshall while talking about Afghan reconstruction, resulting in discussion of a 'Marshall Plan' for Afghanistan. The decision against a significant expansion of international presence and development assistance was later seen by historians as a major error. However, the US's growing commitment to Iraq, which it had invaded in March 2003, was absorbing more and more resources, which would have made committing such resources to Afghanistan impossible.

In the years following the invasion and overthrow of the Taliban, millions of Afghan refugees, who had fled during the previous decades of war, returned to Afghanistan from Pakistan and Iran. By 2012, over 5.7 million had returned, increasing the country's population by 25%.

== See also ==
- List of invasions in the 21st century
- 2003 invasion of Iraq

== Bibliography ==
=== Articles ===
- Bearak, Barry (12 September 2001a). "Condemning Attacks, Taliban Says bin Laden Not Involved". The New York Times. Archived from the original on 18 November 2013.
- Bearak, Barry (13 September 2001b). "AFTER THE ATTACKS: THE AFGHANS; Taliban Plead for Mercy to the Miserable in a Land of Nothing". The New York Times.
- Biddle, Stephen (November 2002). "Afghanistan and the Future of Warfare: Implications for Army and Defense Policy" (PDF). Strategic Studies Institute.
- Crawford, Neta (September 2011). "Civilian Death and Injury in Afghanistan, 2001–2011" (PDF). Costs of War Project.
- George, Susannah (15 August 2021). "Afghanistan's military collapse: Illicit deals and mass desertions". Washington Post. ISSN 0190-8286.
- Hersh, Seymour (28 January 2002). "The Getaway". The New Yorker.
- Jalali, Ali (2001). "Afghanistan: The Anatomy of an Ongoing Conflict". Parameters. 31 (1): 85–98. doi:10.55540/0031-1723.2024. S2CID 150407995.
- Jones, Seth (2008). "The Rise of Afghanistan's Insurgency: State Failure and Jihad". International Security. 32 (4): 7–40. doi:10.1162/isec.2008.32.4.7. ISSN 0162-2889. JSTOR 30129790. S2CID 57568287.
- Maloney, Sean (2004). "Afghanistan: From here to eternity?". Parameters. Archived from the original on 15 January 2009.
- Quigley, John (2003). "The Afghanistan War and Self-Defense". Valparaiso University Law Review. 37 (2): 541–562.
- Risen, James (10 July 2009). "U.S. Inaction Seen After Taliban P.O.W.'s Died". The New York Times. ISSN 0362-4331.
- Sanger, Andrew (2009). "Review of Terrorism, War and International Law: The Legality of the Use of Force Against Afghanistan in 2001". Democracy and Security. 5 (3): 316–319. doi:10.1080/17419160903181676. ISSN 1741-9166. JSTOR 48602655. S2CID 142766937.
- Stent, Angela (8 September 2021). "The impact of September 11 on US-Russian relations". Brookings.
- Tyrangiel, Josh (16 December 2001). "Inside Tora Bora: The Final Hours?". Time. Archived from the original on 3 February 2002.

=== Books ===
- AEI (24 July 2008). "America and the War on Terror". AEI Public Opinion Study. Archived from the original on 4 April 2015.
- Auerswald, David P.; Saideman, Stephen M. (2014). NATO in Afghanistan: Fighting Together, Fighting Alone. Princeton University Press. ISBN 978-1-4008-4867-6.
- Barfield, Thomas (2012). Afghanistan: A Cultural and Political History. Princeton University Press. ISBN 978-0-691-15441-1.
- Bergen, Peter L. (2011). The Longest War: The Enduring Conflict between America and Al-Qaeda. Free Press. ISBN 978-0-7432-7894-2.
- Bergen, Peter L. (2021). The Rise and Fall of Osama Bin Laden. Simon and Schuster. ISBN 978-1-9821-7052-3.
- Call, Steve (2010). Danger Close: Tactical Air Controllers in Afghanistan and Iraq. Texas A&M University Press. ISBN 978-1603441421.
- Coll, Steve (2004). Ghost Wars: The Secret History of the CIA, Afghanistan, and Bin Laden, from the Soviet Invasion to September 10, 2001. New York: Penguin Press. ISBN 978-1-59420-007-6.
- Coll, Steve (2019). Directorate S: The C.I.A. and America's Secret Wars in Afghanistan and Pakistan. Penguin Group. ISBN 9780143132509.
- Corera, Gordon (2012). MI6: Life and Death in the British Secret Service. W&N. ISBN 978-0753828335.
- Fairweather, Jack (2014). "Chapter 3: Good Taliban". The Good War: Why We Couldn't Win the War Or the Peace in Afghanistan. Jonathan Cape. ISBN 978-0-224-09736-9.
- Farrell, Theo (2017). Unwinnable: Britain's War in Afghanistan, 2001–2014. Bodley Head. ISBN 978-1847923462.
- Giustozzi, Antonio (2019). The Taliban at War: 2001 - 2018. Oxford University Press. ISBN 978-0-19-009239-9.
- Jones, Seth (2009). In the Graveyard of Empires. Norton & Company. ISBN 9780393068986.
- Lowrey, Nathan (2011). U.S. Marines in Afghanistan, 2001-2002: From the Sea (PDF). Washington, D.C.: History Division, United States Marine Corps. ISBN 978-0-16-089557-9.
- Maley, William (2012). "PRT activity in Afghanistan: the Australian experience". In Hynek, Nik; Marton, Péter (eds.). Statebuilding in Afghanistan: Multinational Contributions to Reconstruction. Routledge. ISBN 978-1-136-66101-3.
- Maley, Maley (2020). The Afghanistan Wars (3rd ed.). Bloomsbury Academic. ISBN 978-1352011029.
- Malkasian, Carter (2021). The American War in Afghanistan: A History. Oxford University Press. ISBN 978-0197550779.
- Mazzetti, Mark (2013). The way of the knife: the CIA, a secret army, and a war at the ends of the Earth. Internet Archive. Penguin. ISBN 9781594204807.
- Naylor, Sean (2015). Relentless strike : the secret history of Joint Special Operations Command. Internet Archive. New York : St. Martin's Press. ISBN 978-1-250-01454-2.
- Neville, Leigh (2015). Special Forces in the War on Terror. Osprey Publishing. ISBN 978-1472807908.
- Rashid, Ahmed (2008). Descent into Chaos : the US and the Failure of Nation Building in Pakistan, Afghanistan, and Central Asia. Internet Archive. New York : Viking. ISBN 978-0-670-01970-0.
- Risen, James (2008). State of War: The Secret History of the CIA and the Bush Administration. Simon & Schuster UK. ISBN 978-1-84737-511-7.
- Schroen, Gary (2005). First In: An Insider's Account of How the CIA Spearheaded the War on Terror in Afghanistan. Random House Publishing Group. ISBN 978-0-345-48459-8.
- Stanton, Doug (2009). Horse Soldiers: The Extraordinary Story of a Band of U.S. soldiers Who Rode to Victory in Afghanistan. Scribner. ISBN 9781416580515.
- Williamson, Myra (2013). Terrorism, War and International Law: The Legality of the Use of Force Against Afghanistan in 2001. Ashgate Publishing, Ltd. ISBN 978-1-4094-9656-4.
- Whitlock, Craig (2021). The Afghanistan Papers: A Secret History of the War. Simon and Schuster. ISBN 978-1-9821-5902-3.
- Woodward, Bob (2002). Bush at War. Internet Archive. New York : Simon & Schuster. ISBN 978-0-7432-0473-6.
- Wright, Donald P.; Bird, James; Clay, Steven; et al. (2010). A Different Kind of War: The United States Army in Operation Enduring Freedom (OEF) October 2001-September 2005 (PDF). Fort Leavenworth, Kansas: Combat Studies Institute Press. Archived from the original (PDF) on 30 December 2016.
- Wright, Lawrence (2007). The Looming Tower : Al-Qaeda and the Road to 9/11. Internet Archive. New York : Vintage Books. ISBN 978-1-4000-3084-2.
