= Battle of Sayyd Alma Kalay =

2001 conflict

- Part of the War in Afghanistan and Afghan Civil War
Date	4 December 2001
Location	Sayyd Alma Kalay, Arghandab River, Afghanistan
Result	Allied victory

Belligerents
United States; Islamic State of Afghanistan	Islamic Emirate of Afghanistan

Commanders and leaders
(United States) Jason Amerine (Afghanistan) Hamid Karzai	

Strength
300	

The Battle of Sayyd Alma Kalay that took place near the Arghandab River in Afghanistan during the United States invasion of Afghanistan. The Taliban were defeated by the United States and its Afghan allies, setting the stage for the Fall of Kandahar.

== Battle ==
On 3 December 2001, following previous combat at the Battle of Shawali Kowt, as the Afghans scaled to the top of a ridge overlooking the Taliban-controlled town of Sayyd Alma Kalay, they were hit by machine gun fire and RPGs. The Afghans began retreating, so Captain Jason Amerine and his men ran forward and fired down on the enemy. Despite being exposed to intense fire, Sgt. Alan Yoshida, the air-combat controller, advanced toward the hilltop and directed airstrikes that wiped out three Taliban positions. The battle continued on 4 December, and Amerine's team finally drove off the Taliban and took control of the town and bridge while Hamid Karzai's men held the ridge. As combat eased, the leaders from the army's Third Battalion headquarters arrived by helicopter on 5 December to give Amerine and his men a break. For the first time in weeks, they received care packages and letters from home. After this, the Taliban planned to formally surrender Kandahar Province.
