= Obaidullah Akhund =

Taliban politician and insurgent commander (c.1968–2010)

Mullah Obaidullah Akhund
- عبيدالله آخوند
- Akhund, c. 1990s–2000s

Second Deputy Leader of the Taliban
- In office May 2002 – February 2007 Serving with Abdul Ghani Baradar
- Supreme Leader: Mullah Omar
- Preceded by: Position established
- Succeeded by: Akhtar Mansour

Minister of Defense
- In office 15 April 1997 – 9 September 2001; Disputed with Ahmad Shah Massoud
- Prime Minister: Mohammad Rabbani; Abdul Kabir (acting)
- Preceded by: Ahmad Shah Massoud
- Succeeded by: Mohammad Qasim Fahim

Personal details
- Born: c. 1968 Panjwai, Kandahar Province, Kingdom of Afghanistan
- Died: 5 March 2010 (aged 41–42) Karachi, Pakistan
- Party: Taliban
- Occupation: Politician; insurgent commander
- Tribe: Alakozai

Military service
- Allegiance: Mujahideen (1980s–1992); Taliban (1994–2010)
- Years of service: 1994–2010
- Rank: Commander
- Battles/wars: Afghan conflict; Soviet–Afghan War; Afghan Civil War (1989–1992); Afghan Civil War (1992–1996); Afghan Civil War (1996–2001); War in Afghanistan (2001–2021)

Obaidullah Akhund (Pashto: ملا عبيدالله آخوند; c. 1968 – 5 March 2010) was an Afghan politician, insurgent commander, and a senior Taliban leader who was the Minister of Defense in the First Taliban government and then an insurgent commander during the Taliban insurgency against the Afghan government of Hamid Karzai and the US-led NATO forces. He was captured by Pakistani security forces in 2007 and died of heart disease in a Pakistani prison in 2010.

== Biography ==
Obaidullah Akhund was born in the Panjwai district of Kandahar Province in southern Afghanistan and was believed to be born in about 1968. He was of the Alakozai tribe.

Obaidullah Akhund became the Defense Minister of Afghanistan in April 1997, and the second of two top deputies to Mullah Omar, the spiritual leader of the Taliban movement. Obaidullah was seen as the "number three" man in the Taliban. After the fall of Kandahar in December 2001, Obaidullah Akhund was given operational control of the Taliban. In late 2001 or early 2002, Obaidullah surrendered to Afghan Northern Alliance troops near Kandahar and was then released as part of an amnesty.

He was one of the main Taliban military leaders in 2003 and was named to the Rahbari Shura (leadership council). Abdul Latif Hakimi, who was captured by Pakistan in 2005, said that Obaidullah was one of two people with direct access to Mullah Omar and that Obaidullah had personally ordered insurgent attacks, including the killing of a foreign-aid official in March 2005.

Obaidullah was captured by Pakistani security forces in February 2007 in Quetta, Pakistan. He was the most senior Taliban official captured since the start of the war in Afghanistan in 2001.

Obaidullah was freed in November 2007 in exchange for the release of more than 200 Pakistani soldiers captured by the Taliban. He was rearrested in February 2008 and died on March 5, 2010, of heart disease at a prison in Karachi, Pakistan.

Political offices
New seat	Second Deputy Leader of the Islamic Emirate of Afghanistan; 2002–2007 with Abdul Ghani Baradar (first deputy, 2002–2010); Served under: Mullah Omar	Succeeded by Akhtar Mansour
