= Battle of Shawali Kowt =

2001 conflict

- Part of the War in Afghanistan and the Afghan Civil War
Date	December 3, 2001
Location	Shawali Kowt, Arghandab River, Afghanistan
Result	Coalition victory

Belligerents
United States; Northern Alliance	Islamic Emirate of Afghanistan; Taliban

Commanders and leaders
(United States) Jason Amerine	Unknown

Strength
300	Unknown, 30–50 speculated

The Battle of Shawali Kowt took place near the Arghandab River in Afghanistan during the Invasion of Afghanistan. On December 2, 2001, after a pitched street-by-street battle, the Green Berets and Afghan Freedom Fighters captured the town of Shawali Kowt, but could not gain control over a bridge over the Arghandab River, a gateway to the Taliban spiritual center of Kandahar. That night, the Taliban forces launched a major counterattack, triggering a retreat by the Afghans. Over the next eight hours, the American forces defended against the retreat. U.S. Air Force Sergeant Alex Yoshimoto, the combat controller, orchestrated numerous air strikes from a variety of fighters and bombers, thwarting the Taliban charge and forcing the enemy to retreat.
