= Fall of Kandahar =

2001 conflict in Kandahar

Coordinates: 31°37′N 65°43′E

- Part of the Afghan Civil War and the War in Afghanistan (2001–2021)
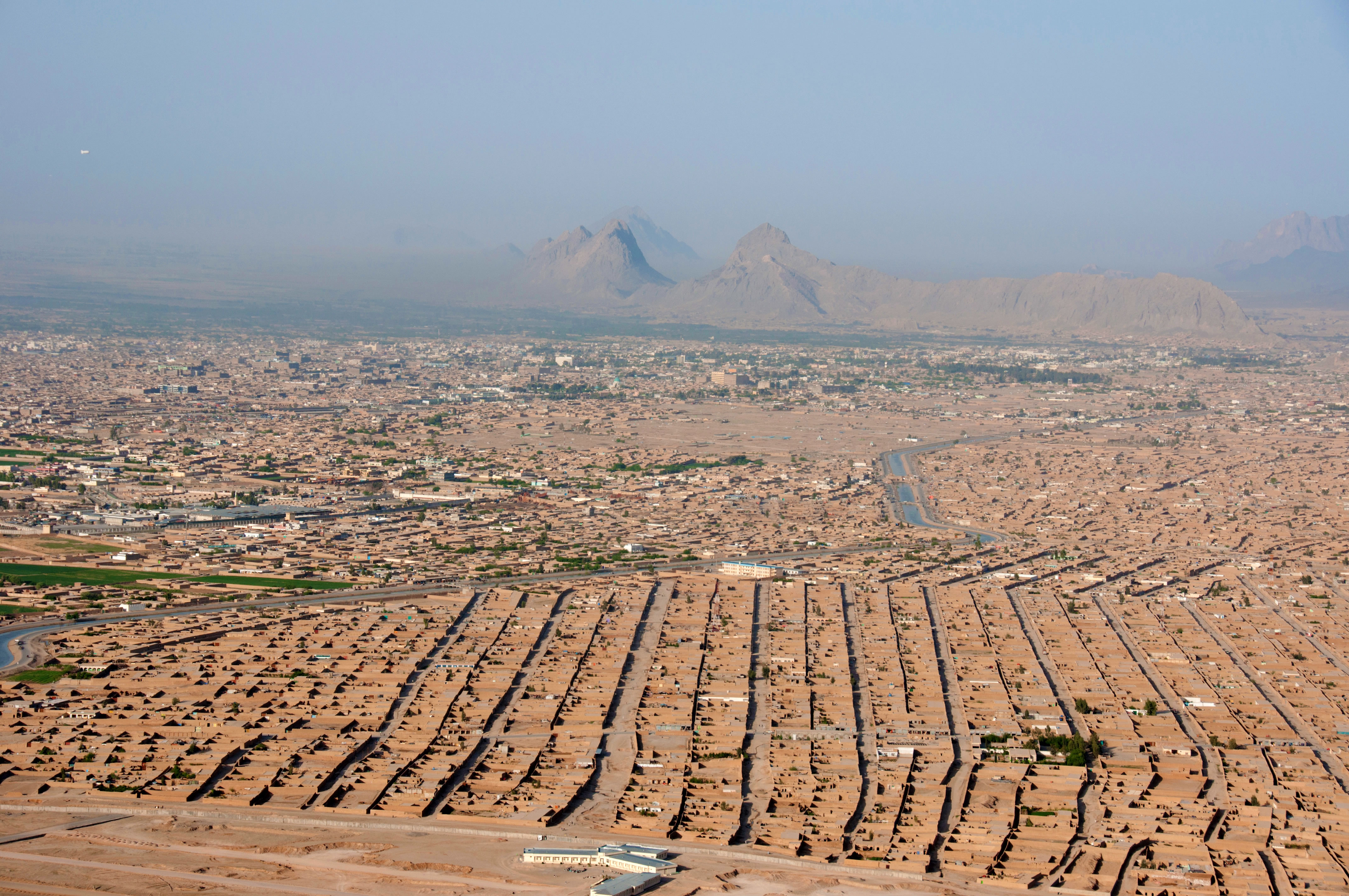
- Aerial view of a section of Kandahar
Date	22 November – 9 December 2001 (2 weeks and 3 days)
Location	Kandahar, Afghanistan
Result	Coalition victory

Belligerents
Gul Sharzai-led militia Islamic State of Afghanistan; United States; Australia	Islamic Emirate of Afghanistan (until 7 December); Taliban; al-Qaeda

Commanders and leaders
(Islamic State of Afghanistan) Gul Agha Sherzai (Islamic State of Afghanistan) Hamid Karzai (United States) Tommy Franks	(Islamic Emirate of Afghanistan (1996–2001)) Mullah Omar; (Islamic Emirate of Afghanistan (1996–2001)) Akhtar Mansour; (Islamic Emirate of Afghanistan (1996–2001)) Obaidullah Akhund; (Islamic Emirate of Afghanistan (1996–2001)) Abdul Ghani Baradar; (Islamic Emirate of Afghanistan (1996–2001)) Abdul Razzaq; (Islamic Emirate of Afghanistan (1996–2001)) Naqibullah; (al-Qaeda) Saif al-Adel; Tayyib Agha; Hafiz Abdul-Majeed

Strength
3,000 Karzai militia 350 Sharzai's militia 800 Eastern Alliance; 750 Americans; 150 Australians	Unknown number of Taliban fighters; 300 Al-Qaeda fighters

Casualties and losses
Unknown Afghan losses 3 Americans killed	Unknown

The Fall of Kandahar took place in 2001 during the War in Afghanistan. After the fall of Mazar-i-Sharif, Kabul and Herat, Kandahar was the last major city under Taliban control. Kandahar was where the Taliban movement had originated and where its power base was located, so it was assumed that capturing Kandahar would be difficult. The city fell after several weeks of fighting to a force of local militia under Pashtun military commanders and their American advisers. The fall of Kandahar was the end of organized Taliban control of Afghanistan.

== Background ==
Kandahar was held by a mixed garrison of Taliban and al-Qaeda troops. The latter were led by Saif al-Adel and mostly consisted of a few hundred Arab mujahideen who had joined the movement in response to the U.S. bombings of Afghanistan.

== Battle ==
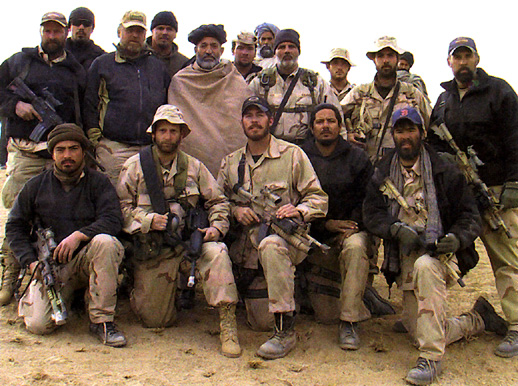
Operational Detachment Alpha 574 of the U.S. Army Special Forces alongside Hamid Karzai at Kandahar Province in October 2001.

On 19 October 2001, Rangers from the 3rd Ranger Battalion (75th Ranger Regiment) departed from four Lockheed MC-130 aircraft towards a desert landing strip south of the city, codenamed "Objective Rhino", supported by 750 U.S. soldiers from the United States Army's 101st Airborne Division to create a forward base at Camp Rhino, 100 miles south of Kandahar.

Anti-Taliban commander Gul Agha Sherzai was contacted by a US Army Special Forces ODA on 18 November. His forces numbered about 800 men, but were severely outnumbered and under-equipped. After receiving supplies, they moved out on 22 November in a convoy of over 100 vehicles and began advancing on Kandahar through the Arghastan desert. Attempting to bypass Taliban strongholds, Sharzai's convoy halted outside the Taliban-held town of Takht-e-pol. While trying to negotiate a surrender, the convoy was ambushed by Taliban forces. Sharzai's forces drove the Taliban back with the help of American air support. The Taliban retreated and abandoned the Takht-e-pol area.

Before the 15th Marine Expeditionary Unit of the United States Marine Corps arrived at 'Rhino' on 25 November, a recce team from SEAL Team 8 carried out a reconnaissance mission, but were mistakenly engaged by AH-1W Cobra attack helicopters, they managed to get a message to the Marines before anyone was wounded.

On 25 November, FOB (Forward Operating Base) Rhino was established outside of Kandahar, cleared in by the SEALs the 15th MEU relieved the 101st Airborne Division of control of FOB Rhino and continued forward operations throughout Kandahar with coalition forces. On 27 November, the 15th MEU was joined by a unit of the Australian Special Air Service Regiment and began joint operations against Taliban forces.

After the Battle of Tarin Kowt, the Eastern Alliance, under the command of Hamid Karzai, spent several weeks in Tarin Kowt attracting recruits. His forces swelled to around 800 men as he prepared to move on Kandahar from the north. On 30 November, Karzai's force began advancing towards the town of Petaw. After taking Petaw without a fight, Karzai's force attempted to take the bridge at Sayd Alim Kalay but was halted by stiff Taliban resistance. After a two-day battle involving heavy airstrikes the Taliban withdrew on 4 December, leaving the bridge intact. Karzai's force seized a bridgehead on the other side.

The next day, a stray American bomb landed on an American position, killing three Special Forces soldiers and wounding Karzai. Karzai's men maintained their positions and began negotiations with the Taliban for the surrender of Kandahar.

On 7 December, Sherzai's men began their assault on Kandahar's airport, but met little resistance. They discovered that the Taliban had already surrendered the city to Karzai's forces. Sherzai's men entered the city and Sherzai was declared Governor of Kandahar. Karzai had already been declared Chairman of the Afghan Interim Administration, though he would not take office until 22 December. Kandahar was fully secured by coalition forces by 9 December. The al-Qaeda troops under Saif al-Adel managed to retreat from the city, escaping to Pakistan.

== Islamic Emirate collapse and Mullah Omar exile ==
Deputy Leader Obaidullah Akhund was given operational control of the Taliban on 5 December as Mullah Omar considered his options. On 7 December, Omar went into hiding within Afghanistan, Kandahar was officially surrendered, and all state institutions of Islamic Emirate of Afghanistan ceased functioning.

== Aftermath ==
In the next two decades, Kandahar was repeatedly attacked by Taliban forces. The latter succeeded in retaking the city after a battle from July to August 2021 as part of a major offensive.
