= List of 2021 Afghanistan attacks =

- Part of the War in Afghanistan and the Taliban insurgency
- Afghanistan (Middle East)
- Location: Afghanistan
- Date: 2021
- Deaths: At least 520
- Injuries: At least 470
- Perpetrators: Islamic State – Khorasan Province; Taliban

There were many terrorist attacks in Afghanistan in 2021. These attacks left at least 350 people dead and at least another 200 injured. The Taliban takeover of Kabul in August 2021 resulted in terrorist attacks increasing 42% in 2021 in Afghanistan compared to 2020.

== Timeline of the attacks ==
Date	Location	Dead	Injured	Details
1 January	Dara-e-Taimoor, Ghor Province	2	0	An attack left 2 people dead, including a journalist, in Dara-e-Taimoor village, Ghor Province.
7 January	Band-e-Khan Abad, Kunduz Province	6	2	The Taliban killed at least 6 security forces and another 2 were injured in Band-e-Khan Abad, Kunduz Province.
7 January	Kabul, Kabul Province	2	0	A gunman shot dead a security force member and an Afghan Air Force pilot in Kabul.
8 January	Ghurian District, Herat Province	4	4	At least 4 security forces were killed and 4 others injured in Ghurian District, Herat Province.
18–19 January	Kunduz, Baghlan and Nimruz Provinces	40+	Several	Over 40 security force members were killed in two days of fighting with the Taliban in Kunduz, Baghlan and Nimruz Provinces, Afghanistan.
20 January	Herat	3	4	Three Afghan National Army soldiers were killed and four others were wounded in an attack by unidentified gunmen on their vehicle in Herat.
15 February	Balkh Province	30	Unknown	30 Taliban militants were killed by an explosion at an IED-making course.
17 February	Herat	2	3	2 policemen were killed and 3 people injured by a bombing in Herat.
2–3 March	Jalalabad, Nangarhar Province	3	1	Three female media workers were shot dead in Jalalabad. A fourth woman was wounded. The Islamic State claimed responsibility for the attack.
4–5 March	Jalalabad	8	1	A female doctor was killed and a child wounded in Jalalabad, after a bomb attached to her rickshaw exploded. Seven workers at a Hazara plaster factory were shot dead in Surkh-Rōd District, Nangarhar. ISIL is suspected to be responsible.
13 March	Herat Province	8	50	Eight people died and 50 others were wounded in a car bombing near a police station in Herat Province.
27 March	Kandahar Province	3	4	A car bombing targeting security officers in Kandahar province killed three people, four others were wounded.
28 March	Faryab Province	2		Taliban fighters killed two security guards at a water dam in Faryab.
28 March	Laghman Province	3		A roadside bombing targeted a police vehicle in Laghman Province, killing three policemen.
30 March	Jalalabad	3		Three female polio vaccinators were shot dead in Jalalabad.
1 April	Jalalabad	1	0	A female police officer was shot dead by unknown assailants in Jalalabad.
4 April	near Kabul	3	12	A car bombing near Kabul killed three security personnel and wounded twelve others.
30 April	Puli Alam, Logar Province	30	90	A car bombing near a guesthouse killed about 30 people and injured about 90 others.
8 May	Kabul	85	150	2021 Kabul school bombing: A bomb blast near a school in western Kabul. The blast left 85 people dead and another 150 were injured.
10 May	Zabul Province	11	29	Eleven people were killed and 29 more were wounded as a roadside bombing struck a bus in Zabul Province.
10 May	Logar Province	9	6	Five members of the National Directorate of Security, the head of the economy directorate of the province and a manager of the Central Bank branch in the province were killed in three separate incidents that all involved attacks by unknown gunmen. In fourth incident, two civilians were killed and six more were wounded after two mortar shells hit their house on Sunday evening.
11 May	Herat Province	3	5	Mullah Mannan Niazi, the deputy leader of a splinter group of Taliban led by Mullah Rasul, was wounded after attackers targeted the area where he lived. Niazi was in a coma and three of his men were killed and four others wounded in the clash.
15 May	Kabul	12	15	A bomb exploded inside a Kabul mosque, killing at least 12 people and injuring another 15. The Islamic State of Iraq and the Levant – Khorasan Province claimed responsibility for the attack.
19 May	Helmand Province	9	3	A bomb struck a car carrying a family of 12 in southern Helmand. Several of the nine family members who died were children. Three wounded children were taken to the provincial hospital in Lashkar Gah.
19 May	Ghor Province	4	0	A roadside bombing, in central Ghor province, destroyed a motorcycle carrying a family of four, all of whom were killed.
19 May	Western Afghanistan	3	0	Militants stopped a bus in western Afghanistan, ordered three men to get out and shot and killed them. The three men on the bus were Hazaras. No one has claimed responsibility for the attack. The government blamed the Taliban, who denied responsibility. Previous attacks on Hazaras, who are mostly Shiite Muslims, have been claimed by the Islamic State group.
29 May	Bagram District, Parwan Province	4	13	A minibus explosion occurred in Bagram District, Parwan Province after being hit by a roadside bomb. The blast left at least 4 people dead and another 13 were injured.
1 June	Kabul	10	12	Bombings left 10 people dead and another 12 were injured in Kabul.
9 June	Baghlan Province	10	Unknown	Ten mine clearers were killed and a dozen of others were wounded while working at a Halo Trust's compound, in Baghlan Province. The Taliban were blamed for the attack but denied responsibility and Halo Trust reported that local Taliban militants arrived at the scene of the attack defending the miners and shooting against the attackers.
9 June	Balkh Province	16	117	A truck full of explosives was detonated at the police headquarters in Balkh Province, killing 16 and wounding 117 others. In addition to the district building that was completely destroyed, and the police headquarters that was almost demolished, 10 houses and 80 shops were damaged in the attack. The Taliban claimed responsibility for the bombing.
12 June	Kabul	7		Two blasts against minibuses carrying civilians killed at least seven near Jinnah Hospital, west of Kabul.
22 July	Spin Boldak, Kandahar Province	100		2021 Spin Boldak shooting
30 July	Herat	1		A UN compound in Herat was attacked, one security guard was killed.
26 August	Hamid Karzai International Airport, Kabul	At least 182	At least 150	2021 Kabul airport attack - Hamid Karzai International Airport was attacked by suicide bombers and gunmen; the attack was claimed by Islamic State – Khorasan Province. It was the deadliest day for the US military (13 killed) in Afghanistan since 2011.
18 September 2021	Kabul and Jalalabad	At least 7	At least 30	At least 7 people were killed and at least 30 were wounded during four explosions which occurred in Nangarhar's capital Jalalabad which targeted a Taliban patrol vehicle and another explosion which occurred in Kabul's Dasht-e-Barchi neighbourhood. ISIS-K claimed responsibility for the blasts, which were directed at the Taliban.
22 September 2021	Jalalabad	At least 5		At least four explosions and an attack by gunmen occurred in the Nangarhar provincial capital of Jalalabad which killed at least five people and wounded many. At least 2 Taliban fighters and a child were killed when attackers opened fired on a vehicle at a local gas station in the provincial capital of Jalalabad. Another child were killed in an explosion in Jalalabad which targeted a Taliban vehicle; three people, including at least two Taliban were also wounded. Another person was wounded in a separate attack which saw another Taliban vehicle bombed.
3 October 2021	Kabul	"Several"	At least 20	Several killed and at least 20 wounded during explosion occurred outside Eid Gah Mosque. The explosion targeted the memorial service for Taliban spokesman Zabihullah Mujahid’s mother.
7 October	Khost	At least 7	More than 15	At least 7 people were killed and more than 15 wounded in an explosion which occurred at a school in Khost.
8 October	Kunduz	At least 50	At least 100	2021 Kunduz mosque bombing: At least 50 people were killed by an IS affiliated suicide bomber who detonated himself in a Shia mosque.
15 October	Kandahar	At least 50	At least 100	2021 Kandahar bombing: At least 50 people were killed by an IS affiliated suicide bomber who detonated himself in a Shia mosque.
October 20	Kabul	At least 1	At least 8	At least 2 wounded after a grenade was launched from Kabul Zoo and successfully struck Taliban security forces stationed in Dehmazang Square in Police District 3 of Kabul. A separate, more powerful IED explosion which targeted a Taliban pickup truck killed at least 1 person and wounded at least 7, including 3 students.
October 21	Kabul			Explosion blew up a power pylon in Qala Murad Beg area of Kabul province, cutting off a 220 kV imported power line which provided power to not only residents of Kabul, but also neighboring provinces.
23 October	Jalalabad	At least 2	At least 4	At least two people were killed and four were wounded when two roadside bombs targeted a Taliban vehicle in Nangarhar's provincial capital of Jalalabad.
2 November	Kabul	At least 25	Many	2021 Kabul hospital attack: At least 25 people killed in a large incident involving explosions and gun attacks at the 400-bed Daoud Khan Military Hospital. Among those confirmed killed was the leader of Kabul Corps of the Islamic army of Afghanistan Hamdullah Mukhlis, who was also known as the "Conqueror of Kabul" after he became the first senior Taliban figure to occupy the Afghanistan presidential palace during the August 15, 2021 Taliban takeover of Kabul
3 November	Jalalabad	At least 2	At least 3	At least 2 people were killed and 3 wounded after a roadside bomb struck a Taliban patrol in Jalalabad. A Taliban commander who identified himself as "Mubarizand" did not provide details about those killed in the attack, but did state that four Taliban fighters were among those wounded.
12 November	Spin Ghar, Nangarhar province	3+	15	A mosque was bombed.
13 November	Dashte Barchi, Kabul	6	7	A minivan bomb exploded in a Shiite area of Kabul.
23 November	Muhajadin Bazaar, Kabul	Unknown	At least 2 injured	A huge explosion ripped through Kabul's Kandahar Market. The area, formerly known as Bush Market, is also known as the Mujahidin Bazaar. At least 2 Taliban security personnel where injured in the explosion, which resulted from the detonation of a magnetic mine which was attached to a Taliban Ranger vehicle. Gunfire was reported in the area of this explosion as well.
25 November	Karte Parwan locality, Kabul	Unknown	Unknown	Explosion occurs at traffic circle in Kabul's Karte Parwan locality, casualties not immediately known. Afghanistan Interior Ministry claims no casualties.
30 November	Police District Six, Kabul	Unknown	At Least 5	At least five people were wounded in an explosion which occurred in Kabul's Police District Six, including Taliban fighters. Despite denial of casualties from the Interior Ministry and local authorities, injuries to five people, including security personnel, during the blast were confirmed by eyewitnesses as well as the local media outlet Ariana News. Eyewitnesses also revealed that the blast occurred on the road near Habibia High School.
4 December 2021	Fifth Taimani Street, Kabul	Unknown	Unknown	Explosion occurs on Kabul's Fifth Taimani Street, no casualties immediately reported.
10 December 2021	Dashte Barchi, Kabul	2	4	Taliban reported two separate explosions in Dashte Barchi, Kabul where 2 people were killed and 4 were wounded, including one which occurred on a minibus. However, Kabul journalist Ramin Ahmadyar reported that while the first blast occurred in a car in Dashte Barchi, the second blast occurred in the city's Dehbouri area.
14 December 2021	Tank Logar, Kabul	At least 1	At least 2	A road side bomb exploded targeting IEA Vehicle around 11am in Tank Logar area of PD8 in capital Kabul. One Civilian was Killed and two members of Islamic Emirate of Afghanistan was Injured. So far no group has claimed the responsibility.
23 December	Passport Department headquarters, Kabul	Unknown	Unknown	Car bomb explodes near the gate outside the main passport department office in Kabul. Islamic State later claims responsibility for the attack.

== See also ==
- List of terrorist incidents in 2021
- List of massacres in Afghanistan
