= List of terrorist incidents linked to Islamic State – Khorasan Province =

Terrorist incidents connected to ISIS-K

Logo of the Islamic State's Khorasan Province

This article is a list, arranged by year, of terrorist attacks that have been attributed to or claimed by the Islamic State – Khorasan Province.

== Overview ==
The Islamic State – Khorasan Province (ISIS–K) is a regional branch of the Islamic State terrorist group active in South-Central Asia, primarily Afghanistan. ISIS–K, like its sister branches in other regions, seeks to destabilize and overthrow existing governments of the historic Khorasan region to establish an Islamic caliphate under its strict, fundamentalist Islamist rule.

ISIS–K has conducted numerous high-profile attacks against civilians in Afghanistan and Pakistan. Some of its most notable attacks include a suicide bombing in August 2021 that killed 13 American military personnel and least 169 Afghans in Kabul during the U.S. withdrawal from the country, twin suicide bombings in July 2018 that killed at least 131 at election rallies in Pakistan, and twin bombings in July 2016 that killed 97 Hazara protestors in downtown Kabul.

ISIS–K began with the dispatch of Afghan and Pakistani militants from al-Qaeda-aligned groups to the Syrian Civil War, who returned to the region with instructions and funding to recruit fighters for a branch of the Islamic State in the Khorasan region. The group's traditional base of power began and remains in eastern Afghanistan along the border with Pakistan. While the majority of ISIS–K attacks occur in eastern Afghanistan and western Pakistan, the group has claimed to have fired rockets into Afghanistan's northern neighbors, Tajikistan and Uzbekistan and conducted high-profile attacks in Iran and Russia.

Today, ISIS–K is engaged in a protracted, low-intensity conflict with the Taliban government. Though the Taliban and ISIS–K actively fought against the United States, since the U.S. withdrawal, ISIS–K has shifted its efforts to discredit, destabilize, and overthrow the Taliban regime to establish its envisioned Islamic caliphate. The Taliban, on the other hand, make efforts to target ISIS–K militants through violent raids, protect foreign diplomats and investors from ISIS–K attacks, and publicly downplay the presence of ISIS to attract foreign recognition and investment.

== 2015 ==
Country	Date	Article	Location	Description	Dead	Injured
Afghanistan	18 April 2015	2015 Jalalabad suicide bombing	Jalalabad, Nangarhar	A suicide bomber detonated outside a bank in Jalalabad.	33	100
Pakistan	13 May 2015	2015 Karachi bus shooting	Karachi, Sindh	A group of 8 gunmen attacked a bus in Karachi. Claim disputed.	45+	Dozens

== 2016 ==
Country	Date	Article	Location	Description	Dead	Injured
Afghanistan	13 January 2016		Jalalabad, Nangarhar	Three attackers belonging to ISIS–K launched an attack on Pakistani consulate in Jalalabad, Afghanistan. The attack resulted in death of seven members of Afghan security forces.	7	0
Afghanistan	20 June 2016	Kabul attack on Canadian Embassy guards	Kabul	A suicide bomber targeted a convoy of Canadian embassy security guards. Both ISIS–K and the Taliban claimed responsibility.	15+ or 16 (+1)	9
Afghanistan	23 July 2016	July 2016 Kabul bombing	Kabul	Two suicide bombers blew themselves up during a protest by the Hazara ethnic minority, in Kabul's deadliest attack since 2001	97	260
Pakistan	8 August 2016	August 2016 Quetta attacks	Quetta, Balochistan	Multiple attackers carried out a suicide bombing and shooting at a government hospital where lawyers were gathered. (Also claimed by Jamaat-ul-Ahrar)	94	130+
Pakistan	24 October 2016		Charsadda	An intelligence officer was shot dead. The attack was later claimed by ISIS–K in a statement posted on Amaq.	1	0
Pakistan	24 October 2016	October 2016 Quetta attacks	Quetta, Balochistan	Three armed individuals carried out mass shooting at police cadets at the Quetta Police Training College while they were asleep. One attacker killed during operation while other two blew themselves up, killing 61 cadets. (Also claimed by Lashkar-e-Jhangvi)	61	160+
Afghanistan	26 October 2016		Ghor	Fighters killed at least 30 civilians after abducting them in the Afghan province of Ghor.	30	0
Afghanistan	26 October 2016		Jalalabad, Nangarhar	An ISIS–K suicide bomber killed a number of Afghan tribal elders.	4–15	25
Afghanistan	4 November 2016		Ghor	ISIS–K executed 31 civilians in Ghor Province.	31	0
Afghanistan	5 November 2016		Ghor	ISIS–K abducted at least 6 civilians in Ghor province.	0	6 kidnapped
Pakistan	12 November 2016	2016 Khuzdar bombing	Khuzdar, Balochistan	At least 55 people including women and children were killed when a suicide bomber went off in the crowded Shah Noorani Shrine in Hub town, Lasbela District, Balochistan.	55 (+1)	102+
Afghanistan	16 November 2016		Kabul	A suicide bomber blew himself up in a convoy with members of the Afghan National Security Forces, near the Defense ministry.	6 (+1)	15
Afghanistan	21 November 2016		Kabul	A suicide bombing at a Kabul Shia mosque "Baqir-ul-Olum."	30 (+1)	15
Afghanistan	25 November 2016		Jalalabad, Nangarhar	Multiple bombs exploded in Jalalabad city.	6	27
Pakistan	10 December 2016		Peshawar	ISIS–K has claimed responsibility for killing a counterterrorism police officer and wounding his son in the northwestern Pakistani city of Peshawar.	1	1

== 2017 ==
Country	Date	Article	Location	Description	Dead	Injured
Afghanistan	7 February 2017		Kabul	A suicide blast at Afghanistan's Supreme Court in Kabul. ISIS–K claimed responsibility.	22	41
Afghanistan	8 February 2017		Qush Tepa, Jowzjan	ISIS–K killed six local employees of the International Committee of the Red Cross in the Qush Tepa district in Afghanistan. The assailants also took another two workers with them.	6	2 kidnapped
Pakistan	16 February 2017	2017 Sehwan suicide bombing	Sehwan, Sindh	A suicide bombing at a shrine in southern Pakistan.	90 (+1)	250
Afghanistan	8 March 2017	March 2017 Kabul attack	Kabul	A group of gunmen dressed in white hospital robes attacked the Sardar Daud Khan Hospital.	49	63
Afghanistan	12 April 2017		Kabul	A suicide bomber attacked near government offices in Kabul. ISIS–K claimed responsibility for the attack.	5 (+1)	10
Afghanistan	3 May 2017		Kabul	A suicide car bomber detonated next to a convoy of NATO vehicles near the U.S. embassy in Kabul.	8 (+1)	28
Afghanistan	17 May 2017		Jalalabad, Nangarhar	Four civilians and two police officers were killed when ISIS–K militants stormed a TV station in Jalalabad. Two militants blew themselves up and the other two have taken hostages. They were later killed by the police.	6 (+4)	17
Afghanistan	1 June 2017		Jalalabad, Nangarhar	A car bomb went off outside the airport in Jalalabad.	1	5
Afghanistan	30 June 2017		Achin, Nangarhar	Seven civilians were killed and five others wounded when a bomb planted by ISIS–K militants blew up in the Achin district of Nangarhar province.	7	5
Afghanistan	25 July 2017		Sar-e Pol City	Militants affiliated with ISIS–K beheaded a man allegedly over sorcery in the capital of the northern province of Sar-e-Pol.	1	0
Afghanistan	31 July 2017		Kabul	ISIS–K militants committed an attack on the Iraqi Embassy in the Afghan capital Kabul. One terrorist blew himself up and another three entered the embassy. Two Afghan guards were killed and three others injured in the attack.	2 (+4)	3
Afghanistan	1 August 2017	2017 Herat mosque attack	Herat	Two suicide bombers attacked a Shia mosque in Herat. One of the bombers shot at worshipers with a rifle before detonating himself.	33 (+2)	66
Afghanistan	30 August 2017		Jalalabad, Nangarhar	A suicide bomber detonated his explosives in front of the house of an Afghan MP in Jalalabad. The explosion killed two guards and injured another one. A second attacker was killed before he could detonate himself.	2 (+2)	1
Afghanistan	20 October 2017	20 October 2017 Afghanistan attacks	Du Layna, Ghor	A suicide bombing in a Sunni mosque of Ghor Province. The main target of the attack was a local commander from the anti-Taliban Jamiat party.	33 (+1)	10
Afghanistan	20 October 2017		Kabul	A suicide bomber attacked inside a Shia mosque in Kabul.	56 (+1)	55
Afghanistan	31 October 2017		Kabul	An ISIS–K suicide bomber blew himself up in Kabul.	14 (+1)	13
Afghanistan	7 November 2017		Kabul	A TV building was attacked in downtown Kabul by three militants. An employee and a security guard were killed. At least one militant blew himself up while the others were killed during a gunfight with security forces. ISIS–K claimed responsibility for the attack.	2 (+3)	20
Afghanistan	16 November 2017		Kabul	At least 19 people including eight police officers and ten civilians were killed in a bomb explosion outside a restaurant in Kabul.	19	10
Afghanistan	18 December 2017		Kabul	Gunmen attacked a training center of the National Directorate of Security in Kabul, injuring two policemen. All three attackers were gunned downed.	0 (+3)	2
Afghanistan	25 December 2017		Kabul	A suicide bomb attack near the compound of Afghanistan's intelligence agency in Kabul.	10 (+1)	5
Afghanistan	28 December 2017	December 2017 Kabul suicide bombing	Kabul	A suicide bomber stormed a Shi'ite cultural center and news agency in the Afghan capital, killing and wounding some including a number of students attending a conference. Two other bombs were detonated in the zone.	50 (+1)	80

== 2018 ==
Country	Date	Article	Location	Description	Dead	Injured
Afghanistan	4 January 2018		Kabul	A suicide bombing targeted a mobile police checkpoint in Kabul.	20	30
Afghanistan	7 January 2018		Kunar	Insurgents stormed a security checkpoint in Afghanistan's eastern Kunar province.	3	8
Afghanistan	24 January 2018	2018 Save the Children Jalalabad attack	Jalalabad, Nangarhar	A complex attack began with a suicide car bomb outside the Save The Children offices in the city of Jalalabad followed by gunmen entering the compound and fighting Afghan special forces.	6	27
Afghanistan	29 January 2018		Kabul	11 Afghan soldiers were killed and 16 others were injured when five ISIS–K militants attacked an army post in Kabul. Four attackers were later killed by the security forces and another was arrested.	11 (+4)	16
Afghanistan	24 February 2018		Kabul	A suicide blast in the Shash Darak area of Kabul.	3 (+1)	6
Afghanistan	7 March 2018		Jalalabad, Nangarhar	A suicide bomber killed three people including the local head of the Ministry of Hajj and Religious Affairs.	3 (+1)	16
Afghanistan	9 March 2018		Kabul	A suicide bomber set off explosives in a crowd of Shiite Muslims near a mosque complex in Kabul.	10 (+1)	22
Afghanistan	19 March 2018		Jalalabad, Nangarhar	A motorcycle bombing in Jalalabad in the Afghan province of Nangarhar.	4	11
Afghanistan	21 March 2018	March 2018 Kabul suicide bombing	Kabul	A suicide bombing near a Shiite shrine in Kabul occurred as Afghans celebrated the Persian New Year.	33 (+1)	65
Afghanistan	25 March 2018		Herat	Two suicide bombers attacked a Shiite mosque in Herat, killing three including the two bombers.	1 (+2)	9
Afghanistan	30 March 2018		Watapur, Kunar	A member of the provincial council of Kunar and a religious scholar were killed in a suicide bombing in the Watapur district of Kunar province. A security guard was also wounded in the attack.	2 (+1)	1
Afghanistan	17 April 2018		Darzab, Jowzjan	IS fighters beheaded a 12-year-old boy in Darzab district in the northern Afghan province of Jowzjan.	1	0
Afghanistan	22 April 2018		Kabul	A suicide bomb attack at a voter registration centre in Koche Mahtab Qala, in the Hazara-majority Dashte Barchi. The casualties were all civilians most of whom had been waiting outside the office to apply for their IDs to register to vote in the upcoming elections. The attack was condemned by the U.S., the United Nations, and others.	69 (+1)	120
Afghanistan	22 April 2018		Chaparhar, Nangarhar	Three brothers were beheaded by ISIS–K militants in Chaparhar district in Nangarhar province in Afghanistan.	3	0
Afghanistan	29 April 2018		Jalalabad, Nangarhar	At least seven people including children and policemen were injured in a bomb attack near a voter registration center in Jalalabad, the capital of the eastern Afghan province of Nangarhar.	0	7
Afghanistan	30 April 2018	30 April 2018 Kabul suicide bombings	Kabul	Two suicide bombings in the Afghan capital Kabul.	29 (+2)	50
Afghanistan	4 June 2018		Kabul	A suicide bomber detonated his explosives targeting a gathering of Afghanistan's top clerics in Kabul. Afterwards, a magnetic bomb attached to a police car exploded and as a result three people were wounded.	14 (+1)	22
Afghanistan	11 June 2018		Kabul	A suicide bomber detonated his explosives at an Afghan ministry in Kabul.	17 (+1)	40
Afghanistan	16 June 2018		Rodat, Nangarhar	A suicide bomber attacked at a gathering of Taliban and Afghan armed forces in the Rodat district of the eastern Afghan province of Nangarhar.	36 (+1)	65
Afghanistan	17 June 2018		Jalalabad, Nangarhar	A suicide bomber detonated his explosives near the governor's compound in Afghanistan's eastern city of Jalalabad.	25 (+1)	50
Afghanistan	30 June 2018		Khogyani, Nangarhar	IS militants beheaded at least three people working as attendants for a local school in the Khogyani district of the eastern Afghan province of Nangarhar. The school building was also set on fire.	3	0
Afghanistan	1 July 2018	July 2018 Jalalabad suicide bombing	Jalalabad, Nangarhar	A suicide bomber detonated his explosives in the center of the eastern Afghan city of Jalalabad, killing at least 20 people including several members of the Sikh minority.	20 (+1)	20
Afghanistan	5 July 2018		Khogyani, Nangarhar	Three Taliban militants including one commander were killed and four civilians injured in a bomb blast in the Khogyani district of the eastern Afghan province of Nangarhar.	0 (+3)	4
Afghanistan	9 July 2018		Chaparhar, Nangarhar	At least nine civilians including two children were injured in a bomb explosion in the Chaparhar district of the eastern Afghan province of Nangarhar.	0	9
Afghanistan	9 July 2018		Khogyani, Nangarhar	A Taliban insurgent and a civilian were killed in the Khogyani district of the Afghan province of Nangarhar.	1(+1)	0
Afghanistan	10 July 2018		Jalalabad, Nangarhar	A suicide bomber detonated his explosives near a petrol pump, killing two officials working for Afghanistan's intelligence agency and 10 civilians including children and sparking a fire that burned eight cars in the eastern Afghan city of Jalalabad. Five other people were taken to hospital.	12 (+1)	5
Afghanistan	11 July 2018		Jalalabad, Nangarhar	A militant attack on the building of the provincial education department in the eastern Afghan city of Jalalabad. One suicide bomber detonated his explosives while two more were shot dead by the security forces in a gunfight lasting several hours.	12 (+3)	9
Pakistan	13 July 2018	13 July 2018 Pakistan bombings	Mastung, Balochistan	At least 131 people were killed and more than 300 others injured in a suicide bombing at election rally.	131	300+
Afghanistan	15 July 2018		Kabul	A suicide bomber blew himself up near a government ministry in Kabul.	8 (+1)	17
Afghanistan	17 July 2018		Sayyad District	27 including some Taliban militants were killed in a suicide bombing that targeted a funeral for a deceased person in the Sayyad district of the northern Afghan province of Sar-e Pol.	27 (+1)	23
Afghanistan	20 July 2018		Bagrami District	A child was injured when a suicide bomber blew himself up before reaching his target in the Bagrami district of Kabul province.	0 (+1)	1
Afghanistan	22 July 2018		Kabul	At least 23 people including an AFP driver were killed in a suicide bombing near Kabul International Airport as scores of people were leaving the airport after welcoming home Afghan Vice President Abdul Rashid Dostum from exile.	23 (+1)	107
Afghanistan	22 July 2018		Surkh-Rōd, Nangarhar	A gunman opened fire in a mosque in the Surkh-Rōd district in the eastern Afghan province of Nangarhar, killing four people and injuring three others, including the mosque's religious leader.	4	3
Pakistan	25 July 2018	2018 Quetta suicide bombing	Quetta, Balochistan	At least 31 people including five policemen and two children were killed after a suicide bomber blew himself up outside a polling station in the Pakistani city of Quetta.	31 (+1)	40
Afghanistan	28 July 2018		Jalalabad, Nangarhar	Two security guards and a driver were killed after a suicide bomber detonated his explosives and another attacker stormed into a training center for midwives in Jalalabad, the capital of the Afghan province of Nangarhar. The second attacker was shot in an hour-long battle with the security forces.	3 (+2)	8
Afghanistan	30 July 2018		Rodat, Nangarhar	A local tribal elder and three of his family members were killed in a suicide car bomb attack in the Rodat district of the eastern Afghan province of Nangarhar. The son of the tribal leader also underwent some injuries in the attack.	4 (+1)	1
Afghanistan	31 July 2018		Jalalabad, Nangarhar	A suicide bomber blew up a car near the entrance to the Department of Refugees and Returnees in the Afghan city of Jalalabad and then two armed men stormed the building. The attackers took several hostages during the attack. Security killed both gunmen after about six hours.	14 (+3)	26
Afghanistan	3 August 2018		Gardez, Paktika	Two militants dressed in burqa entered a Shiite mosque in the town of Gardez in the province of Paktia and opened fire. Both attackers later blew themselves up.	48 (+2)	70
Afghanistan	5 August 2018		Jalalabad, Nangarhar	Three officers of the Afghan National Army were killed and three others injured when a suicide bomber detonated his explosives in front of an army checkpoint in the eastern Afghan city of Jalalabad.	3 (+1)	3
Afghanistan	15 August 2018		Kabul	A suicide bombing in an educative academy of Kabul.	48	67
Afghanistan	5 September 2018		Kabul	Suicide blasts targeted a Kabul Wrestling club and emergency teams, two journalists were among the dead, ISIS–K claimed responsibility for the bombing.	26 (+2)	91
Afghanistan	9 September 2018		Kabul	A suicide bomber on a motorbike blew himself up near a group of people commemorating the death anniversary of a resistance leader in Kabul on Sunday, killing at least seven people and injuring an additional 25, officials said, ISIS–K claimed responsibility for the attack.	7 (+1)	25
Pakistan	26 September 2018		Kalat, Balochistan	Two Pakistani soldiers were killed in the Kalat area of Manghochar Balochistan when they clashed with ISIS–K militants in a compound, all 3 ISIS–K militants were killed.	2 (+3)	6
Afghanistan	2 October 2018		Kama, Nangarhar	A suicide bomber detonated at an election rally in the Kama district of the Nangarhar Province, ISIS–K claimed responsibility through Amaq.	14 (+1)	40
Afghanistan	4 October 2018		Nangarhar	A bomb blast at an office of the U.S. Agency for International Development (USAID), ISIS–K claimed responsibility for the attack.	2	9
Afghanistan	10 October 2018		Momand Dara, Nangarhar	Three civilians were publicly executed by ISIS–K in a desert court in the Momand Dara District of Nangarhar Province.	3	0
Afghanistan	29 October 2018		Kabul	A suicide bomber targeting an Independent Election Commission (IEC) in Kabul detonated, ISIS–K claimed responsibility for the attack.	2 (+1)	7
Afghanistan	31 October 2018		Kabul	A suicide bomber targeting a bus carrying employees of Afghanistan's biggest prison in Kabul detonated, ISIS–K claimed responsibility for the attack.	7 (+1)	5
Afghanistan	12 November 2018		Kabul	A suicide bomber detonated his explosives near Pashtunistan Square, in Kabul City center among a crowd of Hazaras who were protesting violence against them, ISIS–K claimed responsibility for the attack.	6 (+1)	20
Pakistan	23 November 2018	2018 Orakzai bombing	Kalaya	A suicide bomber detonated in a market in the Shi'ite dominated region of Kalaya, northern Pakistan, ISIS–K claimed responsibility.	34 (+1)	56
Afghanistan	23 November 2018		Khost Province	A suicide bombing left 27 Afghan National Army personnel dead in a mosque at an army base in the Khost Province, the Islamic State claimed responsibility for the attack.	27 (+1)	57

== 2019 ==
Country	Date	Article	Location	Description	Dead	Injured
Afghanistan	15 January 2019		Kabul	A car driver was killed in Kabul's PD9 when a magnetic bomb exploded while attached to the car. ISIS–K claimed responsibility and said that the person killed was an Afghan intelligence officer.	1	0
Afghanistan	5 February 2019		Jalalabad, Nangarhar	A policeman was shot and killed by multiple gunmen in a targeted killing in the city of Jalalabad. The gunmen took the man's weapon away and ISIS–K took responsibility for the attack.	1	0
Afghanistan	13 February 2019		Alingar, Laghman	Two Taliban members were killed in an attack by ISIL Khorasan members in Laghman's Alingar District.	2	0
Afghanistan	6 March 2019		Jalalabad, Nangarhar	A suicide bomber attacked a building company near the Jalalabad Airport, later four gunmen attacked the area. All five attackers were killed in the attack. ISIS–K claimed responsibility for the attack.	16 (+5)	10
Afghanistan	7 March 2019		Kabul	Shelling at a gathering commemorating the death anniversary of Shia leader Abdul Ali Mazari. ISIS–K has claimed responsibility for the attack. One of the attackers was arrested.	3	22
Pakistan	12 April 2019	2019 Quetta bombing	Quetta, Balochistan	A suicide blast took place in a potato stall in Shia dominated Hazarganji vegetable market.	22	48+
Afghanistan	20 April 2019		Kabul	An explosion followed by gunfire targeted the Afghan Ministry of Information, killing 10 (7 civilians, 3 security personnel). The four attackers were all eventually killed.	10	5
Afghanistan	17 August 2019	17 August 2019 Kabul bombing	Kabul	A suicide blast took place in the men's reception area of a wedding hall in Kabul, in a Shia neighbourhood, packed with people celebrating a marriage.	92	160+
Tajikistan	6 November 2019		Rudaki, Sughd	Around 20 ISIS militants from Afghanistan conducted an attack on a border post in Tajikistan after crossing into Tajikistan from Afghanistan. The attack resulted in death of a Tajik border guard and a police officer. In the ensuing firefight 15 ISIS militants were killed and five were arrested.	17 (incl. 15 militants)	

== 2020 ==
In 2020, ISIS–K claimed responsibility for 76 attacks, all taking place in Afghanistan. Of the 76 claimed attacks, 39 took place in Nangarhar, 24 in Kabul, 8 in Parwan, 3 in Herat, 1 in Badakhshan, and 1 in Paktia. The claimed attacks killed and wounded 759 (756 Afghan, 3 American), predominately civilians.

The group did not conduct any external operations, attacks beyond its traditional operational area of Afghanistan, during 2020.

ISIS–K's most casualty-producing attacks in 2020 included the suicide bombing of a funeral in Nangarhar (133+ casualties), the mass shooting in a Kabul Shia mosque (114 casualties), the complex attack on Kabul University (85 casualties), and the complex attack and prison break in Jalalabad (79 casualties).

ISIS–K did not claim to have performed any beheadings during 2020.

Country	Date	Article	Location	Description	Dead	Injured
Afghanistan	6 March 2020	6 March 2020 Kabul shooting	Kabul	Two gunmen fired from a building that was under construction. It happened during a ceremony to commemorate the 25th anniversary of the murder by the Taliban of Afghan Shia leader Abdul Ali Mazari. The ceremony was attended by Afghan politician Abdullah Abdullah who escaped unharmed. The two gunmen were killed later the same day. ISIS–K claimed responsibility for the attack.	32	81
Afghanistan	25 March 2020	Kabul gurdwara attack	Kabul	A suicide blast and an armed assault took place at a Sikh shrine in Kabul. During the attack there were 200 worshippers inside the shrine, among them also Indian citizens. Attackers hold hostages inside which caused a 6 hours lasting shootout. The attack resulted in 25 Sikh whorkshippers killed. After the attack, Afghan and NATO soldiers helped with the clearance operation.	25	8+
Afghanistan	12 May 2020	May 2020 Afghanistan attacks	Kuz Kunar, Nangarhar	A suicide bombing took place in Kuz Kunar District, Nangarhar Province at the funeral of Shaikh Akram, a police commander who died of a heart attack a day before.	32	133+
Afghanistan	3 August 2020	Jalalabad prison attack	Jalalabad, Nangarhar	An attack was launched by ISIS–K-affiliated gunmen in Jalalabad prison, in which 200 ISIS–K-affiliated prisoners managed to escape. Three gunmen also died.	29 (+3)	50+
Afghanistan	25 October 2020		Kabul	An Islamic State suicide bomber struck near an education centre in the Afghan capital Kabul on Saturday.	18 (+3)	57
Afghanistan	10 December 2020		Jalalabad, Nangarhar	TV and radio presenter Malalai Maiwand and her driver were killed in a shooting attack on their vehicle in the regional capital Jalalabad. The Islamic State claimed responsibility for the attack.	2	0

== 2021 ==
In 2021, ISIS–K claimed responsibility for 343 separate attacks, taking place in Afghanistan and Pakistan. Within Afghanistan, the group claimed 327 attacks: 173 in Nangarhar, 81 in Kabul, 21 in Kunar, 20 in Parwan, 14 in Kunduz, 5 in Samangan, 3 each in Baghlan, Farah, and Logar, 2 in Herat, and one attack each in Takhar and Kandahar provinces. In neighboring Pakistan, the group claimed 16 attacks (all in the Pashtun-dominated Khyber Pakhtunkhwa Province): 5 in Peshawar, 4 in Bajaur, 3 in South Waziristan, 2 in Kohat, and 1 each in Orakzai and North Waziristan districts. The claimed attacks killed and wounded 2,092 (2,052 Afghan, 13 American, and 27 Pakistani), predominately civilians.

The group did not conduct any external operations, attacks beyond its traditional operating areas in Afghanistan and Pakistan, during 2021.

ISIS–K's most casualty-producing attacks in 2021 included the suicide bombing at Abbey Gate against civilians and American military (332+ casualties), the suicide bombing of a Shia mosque in Kunduz (193+ casualties), the suicide bombing of a Shia mosque in Kandahar (135+ casualties), and the suicide bombing of a Kabul hospital (75+ casualties).

ISIS–K did not claim to have performed any beheadings during 2021.

Country	Date	Article	Location	Description	Dead	Injured
Afghanistan	2 March 2021		Jalalabad, Nangarhar	Three female media workers are shot dead in Jalalabad.	3	1
Afghanistan	8 May 2021	2021 Kabul school bombing	Kabul	A car bombing followed by two more improvised explosive device (IED) blasts occurred in front of Sayed al-Shuhada school in Dashte Barchi, a predominantly Shia Hazara area in western Kabul. The majority of the casualties were girls between 11 and 15 years old. The attack took place in a neighborhood that has been attacked by militants belonging to ISIS–K over the years. The Taliban blamed the attack on IS–KP.	90	220
Afghanistan	10 May 2021		Pul-e-Matak, Parwan	A bus was hit by an IED, leaving 2 civilians dead. IS–K claimed the attack, stating that the Shia's on the bus were the target.	2	9
Afghanistan	13 May 2021		Sardawra, Kunduz	Two civilians including a child were killed after a remote-controlled explosive was detonated. IS–K later claimed responsibility.	2	14
Afghanistan	14 May 2021		Kabul	12 people were killed including an Imam while worshipping in a mosque when an IED exploded within the mosque. ISIS later claimed responsibility.	12	15
Afghanistan	2 June 2021		Kabul	Two bombs were detonated targeting two different buses in Kabul. Both buses were transporting passengers of the Hazara ethnic group. ISIS later claimed the attack via Telegram.	10	12
Afghanistan	8 June 2021		Baghlan	ISIS–K claimed responsibility for attacking de-mining workers in Baghlan Province (north of the Afghan capital Kabul), 10 de-miners were shot dead.	10	16
Afghanistan	12 June 2021		Kabul	ISIS–K claimed responsibility for planting sticky bombs onto two vans carrying Shi'ites in a part of Kabul, creating two car bombs.	7	4+
Afghanistan	20 July 2021		Kabul	ISIS–K took responsibility for three rocket attacks which landed outside Afghan government presidential palace. Afghan president, Ashraf Ghani and other government and security officials were taking part in prayer at the time of the attack. No casualties were reported in the attack.	0	0
Afghanistan	27 July 2021		Jalalabad, Nangarhar	ISIS–K claimed responsibility for the assassination of a NDS operative.	1	0
Afghanistan	28 July 2021		Kunduz	ISIS–K operatives abducted an Afghan police officer and released a video of them executing him with a pistol in the Kunduz area.	1	0
Afghanistan	29 July 2021		Jalalabad, Nangarhar	ISIS–K claimed responsibility for assassinating an employee of the Pakistani embassy in Jalalabad.	1	0
Afghanistan	1 August 2021		Jalalabad, Nangarhar	ISIS–K claimed responsibility for the assassination of a rival Taliban operative in Jalalabad.	1	0
Afghanistan	2 August 2021		Herat	ISIS–K claimed responsibility for detonating an explosive device targeting a bus full of Shias in the city of Herat.	3	10
Afghanistan	9 August 2021		Jalalabad, Nangarhar	ISIS–K claimed responsibility for assassinating a former officer of the Afghan army in Jalalabad.	1	0
Afghanistan	26 August 2021	2021 Kabul airport attack	Hamid Karzai International Airport, in Kabul	An ISIS–K suicide bomber blew himself up at the Kabul airport, killing 170 Afghan civilians and 13 U.S. military personnel. The killed Americans were identified as 10 U.S. Marines, two soldiers and one United States Navy medic. Three of the killed Afghans were British citizens. More than 200 other people were wounded, including a number of Taliban members and 18 Americans.	183	200+
Afghanistan	18 September 2021		Jalalabad and Kabul	A series of bomb attacks in Jalalabad and Kabul City killed 7 people, including 2 Taliban fighters, and injured 30 others. ISIS took responsibility for the series of bomb attacks and claimed that it killed or wounded more than 35 Taliban fighters in those bomb attacks.	7	30
Afghanistan	22 September 2021		Jalalabad, Nangarhar	Two Taliban fighters and a civilian were killed in an attack by gunmen affiliated with Islamic State on security checkpoint in Jalalabad City, according to eyewitness and security officials.	3	0
Afghanistan	3 October 2021		Kabul	An explosion at the entrance to the Eidgah Mosque in Kabul left at least five people dead, where a memorial service was held for the mother of Taliban spokesman Zabihullah Mujahid. ISIS–K later claimed responsibility, saying it targeted and killed several Taliban operatives.	5	7
Afghanistan	6 October 2021		Khost	ISIS–K claimed responsibility for a grenade attack on a religious school in the city of Khost, killing at least 7 people including at least one Taliban fighter.	7	15+
Afghanistan	8 October 2021	2021 Kunduz mosque bombing	Kunduz	On 8 October, a Uyghur Islamic State militant, by the name of Muhammad al-Uyghuri killed 55–100 people and injured dozens more after launching a suicide bombing on a Shi'ite mosque in the city of Kunduz.	55	100+
Afghanistan	15 October 2021	2021 Kandahar bombing	Kandahar	A suicide bombing occurred at the Imam Bargah mosque, a Shia mosque during Friday prayers in Kandahar, killing at least 65 people and wounding more than 70 others. The Islamic State – Khorasan Province claimed responsibility for the attack via their Amaq News Agency.	65	70+
Afghanistan	2 November 2021	2021 Kabul hospital attack	Kabul	On 2 November 2021, bombers and gunmen attacked Daoud Khan Military Hospital in Kabul. Militants attacked the hospital at its entrance gate by explosion and caused another explosion nearby, then continued the attack using guns. The Taliban said that they killed four attackers and arrested another.	25	50+
Afghanistan	13 November 2021		Kabul	At least 2 killed and at least 5 injured in IED explosion which struck a bus in traveling on the main avenue in Kabul Dashti Barchi neighborhood.	2	5
Afghanistan	17 November 2021		Kabul	Twin blasts in western Kabul's Dasht-e Barchi neighborhood killed one and wounded six others.	1	6
Pakistan	24 November 2021		Rawalpindi, Punjab	On 24 November 2021, ISIS–K delineates "Khorasan Province" from "Pakistan Province" in attack claims, one involving targeted killing in Rawalpindi.	1	0
Afghanistan	23 December 2021		Kabul	A car bomb exploded near the gate outside the main passport department office in Kabul. Islamic State later claims responsibility for the attack.	0	0

== 2022 ==
In 2022, ISIS–K claimed responsibility for 196 separate attacks, taking place in Afghanistan, Pakistan, and Uzbekistan. Within Afghanistan, the group claimed 154 attacks: 50 in the capital city of Kabul, 32 in Kunar, 22 in Nangarhar, 11 in Takhar, 8 in Balkh, 8 in Kunduz, 5 in Logar, 4 in Herat, 4 in Laghman, 3 in Badakhshan, 1 in Parwan, 1 in Samangan, and 1 unknown. In neighboring Pakistan, the group claimed 26 attacks (all in the Pashtun-dominated Khyber Pakhtunkhwa Province): 20 in Bajaur, 18 in Peshawar, 2 in South Waziristan, and 1 unknown. The claimed attacks killed and wounded 1,294 (964 Afghan, 312 Pakistani), predominately civilians.

The group launched its first claimed attack against Afghanistan's northern neighbor, Uzbekistan, in April 2022, targeting Uzbek forces with ten Katyusha missiles launched from Afghan territory.

ISIS–K's most casualty-producing attacks in 2022 included the March bombing of a Shia mosque in Peshawar (265 casualties), September bombing of an educational center in Kabul (162), April bombing of a Shia mosque in Mazar-i-Sharif (100), and August bombing of a Shia mosque in Kabul (50).

ISIS–K conducted 2 beheadings in 2022. On 15 March, the group beheaded a purported Afghan spy in Kabul city. On 11 July, the group beheaded an Afghan Talib in the northern city of Mazar-i-Sharif. Images of the results of both beheadings were published in the Islamic State's an-Naba newsletter.

Means of attack in 2022
1. Pistol 21 (20.2%)
2. Suicide vest 2 (1.92%)
3. Bomb 44 (42.3%)
4. Rifle 18 (17.3%)
5. Complex attack 5 (4.81%)
6. VBIED 1 (0.96%)
7. Rockets 1 (0.96%)
8. Other 12 (11.5%)
Attack target types in 2022
1. Government (83.0%)
2. Civilian (14.0%)
3. Political (0.50%)
4. Infrastructure (3.00%)
Attack locations in 2022
1. Pakistan (22.0%)
2. Afghanistan (78.0%)
3. Uzbekistan (1.00%)

Country	Date	Article	Location	Description	Dead	Injured
Afghanistan	1 January 2022		District 5, Kabul	ISIS–K attacked Afghan Taliban using an unidentified explosive device	6 (claimed)	
Afghanistan	1 January 2022		District 5, Kabul	ISIS–K attacked Afghan Taliban using an unidentified explosive device	3 (claimed)	
Afghanistan	4 January 2022		Mahmandarah, Nangarhar	ISIS–K attacked a supposed Afghan spy	1	0
Afghanistan	10 January 2022		District 8, Kabul	ISIS–K attacked Afghan Taliban using an unidentified explosive device	7 (claimed)	
Afghanistan	11 January 2022		Bel Minarha, Herat	ISIS–K attacked Afghan Taliban using rifles and looted a dropped rifle	1	0
Afghanistan	12 January 2022		District 9, Kabul	ISIS–K attacked Afghan Taliban using an unidentified explosive device	2 (claimed)	
Afghanistan	13 January 2022		District 4, Kabul	ISIS–K attacked Afghan Taliban using an unidentified explosive device	6 (claimed)	
Afghanistan	14 January 2022		Salim Karwan, Kabul	ISIS–K attacked Afghan Taliban using an unidentified explosive device	2 (claimed)	
Afghanistan	14 January 2022		Suki, Kunar	ISIS–K attacked a Taliban military base using rifles and rocket-propelled grenades	0	2
Pakistan	14 January 2022		Shekel, Kunar	ISIS–K attacked Afghan Taliban using an unidentified explosive device	0	0
Afghanistan	16 January 2022		District 5, Kabul	ISIS–K attacked Afghan Taliban using an unidentified explosive device	8 (claimed)	
Afghanistan	16 January 2022		District 22, Kabul	ISIS–K attacked Afghan Taliban using an unidentified explosive device	5 (claimed)	
Afghanistan	16 January 2022		District 5, Kabul	ISIS–K attacked Afghan Taliban using an unidentified explosive device	5 (claimed)	
Pakistan	16 January 2022		Peshawar	ISIS–K assassinated a supposed Pakistani spy using a pistol	1	0
Afghanistan	16 January 2022		Badkor, Suki, Kunar	ISIS–K attacked Afghan Taliban with an unidentified weapon	1	0
Afghanistan	22 January 2022		District 12, Herat City, Herat	ISIS–K attacked a group of Afghan Shia Muslims using an unidentified explosive device	20 (claimed)	
Afghanistan	23 January 2022		Taloqan, Takhar	ISIS–K attacked Afghan Taliban using a pistol and looted a rifle	1	0
Afghanistan	24 January 2022		Takht Shah, Logar	ISIS–K attacked Afghan Taliban using rifles	2	1
Afghanistan	25 January 2022		Kama, Nangarhar	ISIS–K attacked Afghan Taliban using an unidentified explosive device	0	4
Afghanistan	30 January 2022		Bisht, Sercano, Kunar	ISIS–K attacked Afghan Taliban using rifles	1	1
Afghanistan	2 February 2022		Deukal, Suki, Kunar	ISIS–K burned the house of a Taliban military leader	0	0
Pakistan	3 February 2022		Khyber Pakhtunkhwa	ISIS–K attacked Pakistani police using rifles	2	1
Afghanistan	3 February 2022		Taloqan, Takhar	ISIS–K attacked Afghan Taliban using rifles and looted a dropped rifle	2	0
Pakistan	3 February 2022		Peshawar	ISIS–K attacked an Afghan Talib using a pistol and looted two rifles and a pistol	1	0
Afghanistan	3 February 2022		Imam Sahib, Kunduz	ISIS–K killed an Afghan Talib using a knife	1	0
Afghanistan	3 February 2022		Kunduz City, Kunduz	ISIS–K killed a Shia Muslim weeks after his capture by the group	1	0
Afghanistan	3 February 2022		Imam, Taloqan, Takhar	ISIS–K attacked Afghan Taliban using rifles	1	0
Afghanistan	7 February 2022		Kama, Nangarhar	ISIS–K attacked Afghan Taliban using a pistol	1	0
Afghanistan	14 February 2022		Suki, Kunar	ISIS–K attacked a Taliban military barracks using rifles and rocket-propelled grenades	0	2
Afghanistan	14 February 2022		Suki, Kunar	ISIS–K attacked a single Afghan Talib using a rifle	0	0
Afghanistan	15 February 2022		Hazar Naw, Mahmandarah, Nangarhar	ISIS–K attacked Afghan Taliban using rifles	7	2
Afghanistan	19 February 2022		Nad Ali, Helmand	ISIS–K attacked an Afghan Shia Muslim using a pistol	1	0
Afghanistan	19 February 2022		Nad Ali, Helmand	ISIS–K attacked Afghan Taliban using a pistol	1	0
Afghanistan	23 February 2022		Suki, Kunar	ISIS–K attacked a Taliban military barracks using rifles and rocket-propelled grenades	0	0
Afghanistan	27 February 2022		Jahartaq, Kunduz	ISIS–K killed an Afghan Talib and confiscated his weapon	1	0
Pakistan	4 March 2022	2022 Peshawar mosque bombing	Peshawar	On 4 March 2022, an Islamic State suicide bomber blew himself up at a Shiite mosque in Peshawar, killing at least 63 people.	63 (+1)	196
Afghanistan	4 March 2022		Nad Ali, Helmand	ISIS–K attacked Afghan Taliban in their home using hand grenades	2	3
Afghanistan	5 March 2022		Ghani Khel, Nangarhar	ISIS–K attacked Afghan Taliban using rifles	1	3
Afghanistan	5 March 2022		Deukal, Suki, Kunar	ISIS–K attacked Afghan Taliban using rifles	1	0
Pakistan	8 March 2022		Sibi, Balochistan	On 8 March 2022, a suicide bomber detonated a suicide vest killing six Pakistani paramilitary men and injuring 22 more.	6 (+1)	22
Afghanistan	8 March 2022		Kunduz City, Kunduz	ISIS–K attacked Afghan Taliban using a pistol	1	0
Pakistan	10 March 2022		Garmunk, Bajaur	ISIS–K attacked Pakistani military soldiers using rifles	1	1
Pakistan	10 March 2022		Khyber Junction, Peshawar	ISIS–K shot at Pakistani police using a pistol	1	0
Afghanistan	10 March 2022		Deukal, Suki, Kunar	ISIS–K attacked Afghan Taliban using an unidentified explosive device	0	1
Afghanistan	15 March 2022		Basul, Mohmand Dara, Nangarhar	ISIS–K attacked Afghan Taliban using an unidentified explosive device	5 (claimed)	
Afghanistan	15 March 2022		Kabul	ISIS–K beheaded a supposed Afghan spy captured in Kabul on camera	2	0
Pakistan	15 March 2022		Phoebe, Peshawar	ISIS–K shot at Pakistani police using a pistol	1	0
Afghanistan	15 March 2022		Asadabad, Kunar	ISIS–K attacked a Taliban military base using rifles and rocket-propelled grenades	1	1
Afghanistan	16 March 2022		Dibet, Watapur, Kunar	ISIS–K attacked Afghan Taliban using an unidentified explosive device	0	0
Afghanistan	17 March 2022		Lashkar Gah, Helmand	ISIS–K killed an Afghan Talib and looted his pistol and motorcycle	1	0
Afghanistan	27 March 2022		Pul-e Alam, Logar	ISIS–K attacked Afghan Taliban using rifles	0	2
Afghanistan	1 April 2022		District 12, Herat City, Herat	ISIS–K attacked a group of Afghan Shia Muslims using an unidentified explosive device	30 (claimed)	
Afghanistan	2 April 2022		District 5, Kabul	ISIS–K attacked Afghan Taliban using an unidentified explosive device	3 (claimed)	
Pakistan	8 April 2022		Mamond, Bajaur	ISIS–K shot at Pakistani police using a pistol	1	0
Afghanistan	8 April 2022		District 4, Kunduz City, Kunduz	ISIS–K destroyed an Afghan power line using an unidentified explosive device	0	0
Afghanistan	9 April 2022		District 5, Kabul	ISIS–K attacked Afghan Taliban using an unidentified explosive device	5 (claimed)	
Afghanistan	9 April 2022		District 8, Kabul	ISIS–K attacked Afghan Taliban using an unidentified explosive device	5 (claimed)	
Pakistan	12 April 2022		Mamond, Bajaur	ISIS–K killed a preacher it accused as being apostatic and blasphemous using an unidentified explosive device	1	0
Pakistan	15 April 2022		Bara Khyber, Peshawar	ISIS–K killed a preacher it accused as being apostatic and blasphemous using a pistol	0	1
Afghanistan	15 April 2022		Dara-e Nur, Nangarhar	ISIS–K assassinated a supposed Afghan spy using rifles	2	0
Pakistan	17 April 2022		Khar, Bajaur	ISIS–K shot at Pakistani police using a pistol	1	0
Pakistan	17 April 2022		Salarzo, Bajaur	ISIS–K destroyed a Pakistani cellular communications tower using an unidentified explosive device	0	0
Afghanistan	18 April 2022		Takht Shah, Logar	ISIS–K attacked Afghan Taliban using rifles	1	1
Afghanistan	18 April 2022		Shekel, Kunar	ISIS–K attacked Afghan Taliban using an unidentified explosive device	1	0
Uzbekistan	18 April 2022		Termez, Surxondaryo	ISIS–K launched ten Katyusha missiles into the city of Termez from Afghan soil, targeting Uzbek military forces	0	0
Afghanistan	19 April 2022		District 6, Kabul	ISIS–K attacked Afghan Taliban using an unidentified explosive device	7 (claimed)	
Afghanistan	19 April 2022		Jalalabad, Nangarhar	ISIS–K attacked Afghan Taliban using rifles	3	2
Afghanistan	20 April 2022		District 4, Kabul	ISIS–K attacked Afghan Taliban using an unidentified explosive device	5 (claimed)	
Pakistan	20 April 2022		Peshawar	ISIS–K shot at Pakistani police using a pistol	1	0
Afghanistan	21 April 2022	2022 Mazar-i-Sharif mosque bombing	Mazar-i-Sharif	A bomb exploded at a Shiite mosque in Mazar-i-Sharif during Friday prayers, killing 31 people and wounding 87.	31	87
Afghanistan	21 April 2022		Kunduz Airport, Kunduz	ISIS–K attacked aircrew members using an unidentified explosive device	15 (claimed)	
Afghanistan	21 April 2022		Khogyani, Nangarhar	ISIS–K attacked Afghan Taliban using an unidentified explosive device	4	1
Afghanistan	21 April 2022		Taloqan, Takhar	ISIS–K attacked Afghan Taliban using a pistol	0	1
Afghanistan	21 April 2022		District 5, Kabul	ISIS–K attacked Afghan Taliban using an unidentified explosive device	Unknown	
Afghanistan	22 April 2022		District 3, Kabul	ISIS–K attacked Afghan Taliban using an unidentified explosive device	5 (claimed)	
Afghanistan	24 April 2022		Fayzabad, Badakhshan	ISIS–K attacked Afghan Taliban using an unidentified explosive device	1	2
Afghanistan	24 April 2022		Taloqan, Takhar	ISIS–K attacked Afghan Taliban using rifles	1	0
Afghanistan	26 April 2022		District 12, Kabul	ISIS–K attacked Afghan Taliban using an unidentified explosive device	10 (claimed)	
Pakistan	26 April 2022		Mamond, Bajaur	ISIS–K killed a preacher it accused as being apostatic and blasphemous using a pistol	1	0
Pakistan	27 April 2022		Wana, South Waziristan	ISIS–K shot at Pakistani police using a pistol	1	0
Afghanistan	28 April 2022		District 10, Mazar-i-Sharif, Balkh	ISIS–K attacked a group of Afghan Shia Muslims using an unidentified explosive device	15 (claimed)	
Afghanistan	28 April 2022		District 3, Mazar-i-Sharif, Balkh	ISIS–K attacked a group of Afghan Shia Muslims using an unidentified explosive device	15 (claimed)	
Afghanistan	28 April 2022		Jabarhar, Nangarhar	ISIS–K attacked Afghan Taliban using rifles	1	0
Pakistan	29 April 2022		Mamond, Bajaur	ISIS–K attacked Afghan Taliban using an unidentified explosive device	1	3
Afghanistan	29 April 2022		Shalanky, Parwan	ISIS–K destroyed an Afghan power line using an unidentified explosive device	0	0
Afghanistan	30 April 2022		District 6, Kabul	ISIS–K attacked a group of Afghan Shia Muslims using an unidentified explosive device	10 (claimed)	
Afghanistan	30 April 2022		Suki, Kunar	ISIS–K attacked Afghan Taliban using an unidentified explosive device	2 (claimed)	
Afghanistan	30 April 2022		Kabul	ISIS–K destroyed an Afghan power line using an unidentified explosive device	0	0
Pakistan	2 May 2022		Wana, South Waziristan, Khyber Pakhtunkhwa	ISIS–K shot at Pakistani police using a pistol	1	0
Afghanistan	7 May 2022		Achin, Nangarhar	ISIS–K attacked Afghan Taliban using an unidentified explosive device	1	2
Afghanistan	7 May 2022		Deukal, Suki, Kunar	ISIS–K attacked Afghan Taliban using an unidentified explosive device	2	0
Afghanistan	7 May 2022		District 17, Kabul	ISIS–K destroyed an Afghan power line using an unidentified explosive device	0	0
Tajikistan	7 May 2022		Khwaja Ghar, Takhar	ISIS–K launched seven Katyusha missiles from Takhar into Tajikistan, targeting Tajik military forces	0	0
Afghanistan	8 May 2022		Mohmand Dara, Nangarhar	ISIS–K attacked a Taliban military barracks using rifles and rocket-propelled grenades	3	0
Pakistan	10 May 2022		Salarzo, Bajaur	ISIS–K attacked a Pakistani police base with rifles and rocket-propelled grenades	0	0
Afghanistan	13 May 2022		Alinkar, Laghman	ISIS–K attacked Afghan Taliban using an unidentified explosive device	Unknown	
Pakistan	15 May 2022		Peshawar	ISIS–K killed two Pakistani Sikhs using a rifle	2	0
Afghanistan	15 May 2022		Norkal, Kunar	ISIS–K attacked Afghan Taliban using rifles	1	1
Afghanistan	17 May 2022		District 17, Kabul	ISIS–K attacked Afghan Taliban using an unidentified explosive device	5 (claimed)	
Afghanistan	18 May 2022		District 4, Nangarhar	ISIS–K attacked Afghan Taliban using a pistol	2	0
Afghanistan	19 May 2022		District 5, Mazar-i-Sharif, Balkh	ISIS–K attacked Afghan Taliban using an unidentified explosive device	10 (claimed)	
Afghanistan	19 May 2022		Kunduz City, Kunduz	ISIS–K attacked an Afghan Shia Muslims using a pistol	3	1
Pakistan	19 May 2022		Peshawar	ISIS–K attacked Pakistani police using rifles	2	0
Afghanistan	19 May 2022		District 4, Taloqan, Takhar	ISIS–K attacked Afghan Taliban using a pistol and looted a rifle	1	0
Afghanistan	20 May 2022		Kunduz City, Kunduz	ISIS–K attacked a group of Afghan Shia Muslims using an unidentified explosive device	10 (claimed)	
Afghanistan	21 May 2022		District 6, Kabul	ISIS–K attacked Afghan Taliban using an unidentified explosive device	1	0
Afghanistan	21 May 2022		Watapur, Kunar	ISIS–K attacked Afghan Taliban using a pistol	0	1
Afghanistan	22 May 2022		Airport Road, Kabul	ISIS–K detonated a suicide vest among a gathering of Afghan Taliban morning the death of Akhtar Mansour	Unknown	
Afghanistan	22 May 2022		Tangi Tashgargan, Samangan	ISIS–K destroyed an Afghan power line using an unidentified explosive device	Unknown	
Afghanistan	25 May 2022		District 10, Mazar-i-Sharif, Balkh	ISIS–K attacked a group of Afghan Shia Muslims using an unidentified explosive device	20 (claimed)	
Afghanistan	25 May 2022		District 5, Mazar-i-Sharif, Balkh	ISIS–K attacked a group of Afghan Shia Muslims using an unidentified explosive device	10 (claimed)	
Pakistan	25 May 2022		Peshawar	ISIS–K shot at Pakistani police using a pistol	1	0
Pakistan	26 May 2022		Peshawar	ISIS–K shot and wounded a Pakistani police officer using a pistol	0	1
Afghanistan	29 May 2022		District 11, Kabul	ISIS–K attacked Afghan Taliban using an unidentified explosive device	3 (claimed)	
Afghanistan	29 May 2022		Nangarhar	ISIS–K attacked a supposed Afghan spy	1	0
Pakistan	29 May 2022		Peshawar	ISIS–K attacked Pakistani police using rifles	0	1
Afghanistan	30 May 2022		Norkal, Kunar	ISIS–K killed a supposed Afghan spy and looted a rifle	1	0
Afghanistan	31 May 2022		District 11, Kabul	ISIS–K attacked Afghan Taliban using an unidentified explosive device	5 (claimed)	
Afghanistan	31 May 2022		Achin, Nangarhar	ISIS–K attacked Afghan Taliban with an unidentified weapon	1	0
Afghanistan	1 June 2022		Imam Sahib, Kunduz	ISIS–K attacked Afghan Taliban using a pistol	1	0
Afghanistan	1 June 2022		Asadabad, Kunar	ISIS–K attacked Afghan Taliban using an unidentified explosive device	Unknown	
Afghanistan	2 June 2022		Pul-e Alam, Logar	ISIS–K attacked Afghan Taliban using rifles	1	0
Afghanistan	3 June 2022		Norkal, Kunar	ISIS–K attacked a Taliban military barracks using rifles and rocket-propelled grenades	Unknown	
Afghanistan	5 June 2022		District 4, Kabul	ISIS–K attacked Afghan Taliban using an unidentified explosive device	3	1
Pakistan	5 June 2022		Bajaur	ISIS–K assassinated a supposed Pakistani spy using a pistol	1	0
Afghanistan	10 June 2022		Pul-e Charki, Kabul	ISIS–K attacked jailers at Kabul's Pul-e Charki prison using unidentified explosive devices	6	0
Pakistan	10 June 2022		Khar Bridge, Bajaur	ISIS–K attacked Pakistani police with hand grenades	0	2
Afghanistan	11 June 2022		Airport, Mazar-i-Sharif, Balkh	ISIS–K attacked Afghan Taliban using rifles	10 (claimed)	
Afghanistan	11 June 2022		Asadabad, Kunar	ISIS–K attacked Afghan Taliban using an unidentified explosive device	2	2
Afghanistan	13 June 2022			ISIS–K attacked Afghan Taliban using an unidentified explosive device	32 (claimed)	
Afghanistan	13 June 2022		Pul-e Charki, Kabul	ISIS–K attacked jailers at Kabul's Pul-e Charki prison using unidentified explosive devices	7 (claimed)	
Afghanistan	13 June 2022		Alinkar, Laghman	ISIS–K attacked Afghan Taliban using rifles	1	0
Afghanistan	14 June 2022		Suki, Kunar	ISIS–K attacked a Taliban military base using rifles and rocket-propelled grenades	1	3
Afghanistan	15 June 2022		Alinkar, Laghman	ISIS–K attacked Afghan Taliban using an unidentified explosive device	0	1
Afghanistan	17 June 2022		Kabul	ISIS–K attacked worshippers in a Hindu and Sikh temple using a rifle and eight hand grenades as well as a vehicle-borne improvised explosive device (VBIED) and four unidentified explosive devices	20 (claimed)	
Afghanistan	17 June 2022		Norkal, Kunar	ISIS–K attacked a Taliban military vehicle with rifles and rocket-propelled grenades	5 (claimed)	
Afghanistan	19 June 2022		Ghani Khel, Nangarhar	ISIS–K attacked Afghan Taliban using an unidentified explosive device	5 (claimed)	
Pakistan	19 June 2022		Peshawar	ISIS–K shot at Pakistani police using a pistol	1	0
Afghanistan	8 July 2022		District 9, Kabul	ISIS–K attacked Afghan Taliban using an unidentified explosive device	2 (claimed)	
Afghanistan	9 July 2022		Mano Gai, Kunar	ISIS–K attacked Afghan Taliban using an unidentified explosive device	1	0
Afghanistan	9 July 2022		Tabur, Kunar	ISIS–K attacked Afghan Taliban using an unidentified explosive device	0	1
Afghanistan	11 July 2022		Mazar-i-Sharif, Balkh	ISIS–K beheaded an Afghan Talib on camera	1	0
Pakistan	12 July 2022		Mamond, Bajaur	ISIS–K assassinated a supposed Pakistani spy using a pistol	2 (claimed)	
Afghanistan	13 July 2022		District 2, Pul-e Alam, Logar	ISIS–K attacked Afghan Shia Muslims using rifles	4	0
Afghanistan	15 July 2022		District 22, Kabul	ISIS–K attacked Afghan Taliban using an unidentified explosive device	5 (claimed)	
Pakistan	16 July 2022		Barracks, Peshawar	ISIS–K attacked Pakistani police using rifles	2	0
Afghanistan	16 July 2022		District 5, Kabul	ISIS–K attacked Afghan Taliban using an unidentified explosive device	1	0
Afghanistan	23 July 2022		Imam Sahib, Kunduz	ISIS–K attacked Afghan Taliban using an unidentified explosive device	3	1
Afghanistan	24 July 2022		District 9, Kabul	ISIS–K attacked Afghan Taliban using an unidentified explosive device	5 (claimed)	
Afghanistan	1 August 2022		Deukal, Suki, Kunar	ISIS–K attacked Afghan Taliban using an unidentified explosive device	6	0
Afghanistan	3 August 2022		Kabul	Two Taliban police officers were killed and four were wounded during a gunbattle with Islamic State gunmen at a hideout in Kabul. Three Islamic State militants were also killed.	2 (+3)	4
Afghanistan	5 August 2022		Jabarhar, Nangarhar	ISIS–K attacked Afghan Taliban using a pistol	1	0
Afghanistan	5 August 2022		Kabul	On 5 August 2022, eight people were killed and 18 others were injured when a bomb hidden in a cart exploded near a Shiite mosque in Kabul. The Islamic State claimed responsibility for the attack.	8	18
Afghanistan	7 August 2022		District 1, Kabul	ISIS–K attacked a group of Afghan Shia Muslims using an unidentified explosive device	10 (claimed)	
Afghanistan	15 August 2022		District 3, Kabul	ISIS–K attacked Afghan Taliban using an unidentified explosive device	9 (claimed)	
Pakistan	15 August 2022		Salarzo, Bajaur	ISIS–K attacked and wounded an unspecified Pakistani political leader and his companion using an unidentified explosive device	0	2
Afghanistan	30 September 2022	September 2022 Kabul school bombing	Kabul	A suicide bomber blew himself up at the Kaaj education center in Dashte Barchi, a Hazara neighborhood in Kabul, killing at least 52 people.	52+	110
Afghanistan	2 December 2022		Kabul	Two attackers opened fire on the Pakistan Chargé d'Affaires Ubaid-ur-Rehman Nizamani at the Pakistani embassy compound in Kabul wounding his bodyguard.	0	1
Afghanistan	12 December 2022	2022 Kabul hotel attack	Kabul	3 ISIS–K militants set off explosives and set fire to the Longan Hotel in Kabul due to its ties to the Chinese government. Six people were killed, including the attackers, and another 18 were injured, including foreign and Afghan civilians and Taliban soldiers.	3 (+3)	18

== 2023 ==
In 2023, ISIS–K claimed responsibility for 48 separate attacks, all in Afghanistan and Pakistan. Within Afghanistan, the group claimed 22 attacks: 7 in the capital city of Kabul, 6 in Kunar, 3 in Badakhshan, 2 in Herat, Nangarhar, and 1 in Baghlan. In neighboring Pakistan, the group claimed 26 attacks (all in the Pashtun-dominated Khyber Pakhtunkhwa Province): 18 in Bajaur District, 7 in the provincial capital city Peshawar, and 1 in Hangu District. The claimed attacks killed and wounded 653 (370 Afghan, 283 Pakistani), predominately civilians. ISIS–K's most casualty-producing attacks in 2023 included the July bombing of a Pakistani political rally (244 casualties), October bombing of a Shia mosque in Pul-e-Khumri (74), June bombing of a funeral gathering in Fayazabad (70), and January bombing of Afghan Taliban at Kabul International Airport (50).

ISIS–K did not claim to have performed any beheadings during 2023.

Means of attack in 2023
1. Pistol (42.0%)
2. Suicide vest (19.0%)
3. Bomb (19.0%)
4. Rifle (13.0%)
5. VBIED (6.00%)
6. Unknown (2.00%)
Attack target types in 2023
1. Government (67.0%)
2. Civilian (27.0%)
3. Political (4.00%)
4. Militia (2.00%)
Attack locations in 2023
1. Pakistan (54.0%)
2. Afghanistan (46.0%)

Country	Date	Article	Location	Description	Dead	Injured
Afghanistan	1 January 2023	2023 Kabul airport bombing	Kabul	An attacker detonated a bomb outside the entrance to the military portion of Kabul International Airport.	20 (claimed)	30 (claimed)
Afghanistan	11 January 2023	Ministry of Foreign Affairs of Afghanistan bombing	Kabul	A suicide bomber detonated outside the Taliban foreign ministry office in Kabul, reportedly during the visit of a Chinese delegation.	20+	
Pakistan	14 February 2023		Mamond, Bajaur	ISIS–K assassinated a supposed Pakistani spy using an unidentified explosive	1	0
Afghanistan	8 March 2023		District 15, Herat City	ISIS–K attacked a Taliban bureaucrat and his associates driving in Herat with rifles	1	2
Afghanistan	9 March 2023		Balkh	ISIS–K killed Taliban governor of Balkh Province, Mohammad Dawood Muzammil, in a suicide-vest attack on the provincial headquarters	2	0
Afghanistan	11 March 2023		Balkh	ISIS–K attacked Shia civilians using an unidentified explosive	30 (claimed)	
Afghanistan	15 March 2023		Shirzad, Nangarhar	ISIS–K attacked an unidentified Afghan government leader and his associates using an unidentified explosive	0	4
Afghanistan	15 March 2023		District 5, Kabul City	ISIS–K assassinated an Afghan Taliban officer using a pistol	1	0
Afghanistan	27 March 2023		Kabul City	ISIS–K attacked diplomats at the Afghan Ministry of Foreign Affairs using a suicide vest	20 (claimed)	
Pakistan	27 March 2023		Tarkho, Bajaur	ISIS–K assassinated a supposed Pakistani spy using a pistol	1	0
Pakistan	31 March 2023		Dir Colony, Peshawar	ISIS–K killed a Sikh man using a pistol	1	0
Pakistan	1 April 2023		Peshawar City	ISIS–K killed a Christian man using a pistol	1	0
Pakistan	12 April 2023		Bajaur	ISIS–K assassinated an Afghan Talib using a pistol	1	0
Pakistan	5 May 2023		Inayat Kali, Bajaur	ISIS–K killed an unidentified rival militant group member using an unidentified explosive	1	0
Pakistan	28 May 2023		Bilal Colony, Peshawar	ISIS–K killed a supposed Pakistani spy using a pistol	1	0
Pakistan	1 June 2023		Peshawar City	ISIS–K killed a preacher it accused as being apostatic and blasphemous using a pistol	1	0
Pakistan	3 June 2023		Bedda Pera, Bajaur	ISIS–K killed a preacher it accused as being apostatic and blasphemous using a pistol	1	0
Afghanistan	6 June 2023		Badakhshan	ISIS–K attacked the car of the Badakhshan deputy governor and his associates using a vehicle-borne improvised explosive device (VBIED)	2	2
Afghanistan	6 June 2023		Faizabad, Badakhshan	ISIS–K attacked Badakhshan provincial government leaders using a suicide vest		
Afghanistan	8 June 2023		Faizabad, Badakhshan	ISIS–K attacked a funeral gathering for a leader killed by ISIS–K two days prior using a suicide-vest	20	50
Pakistan	22 June 2023		Inayat Kali, Bajaur	ISIS–K assassinated a Pakistani political leader using a pistol	1	1
Afghanistan	23 June 2023		Herat City	ISIS–K attacked a group of Afghan Talibs using rifles	30 (claimed)	
Pakistan	23 June 2023		Rashid Garhi, Peshawar	ISIS–K shot and wounded a Sikh man using a pistol	0	1
Pakistan	24 June 2023		Yakatot, Peshawar	ISIS–K killed a Sikh man using a pistol	1	0
Pakistan	2 July 2023		Deukal, Suki, Kunar	ISIS–K killed two Afghan Taliban using rifles and looted the drop weapons	2	0
Pakistan	30 July 2023	2023 Khar bombing	Khar, Bajaur	An ISIS–K suicide bomber detonated an explosive at a Jamiat Ulema-e-Islam (F) rally in Khar.	63+	200+
Afghanistan	1 August 2023		Suki, Kunar	ISIS–K killed a supposed Afghan spy	1	0
Pakistan	16 August 2023		Inayat Kali, Bajaur	ISIS–K shot and wounded a supposed Pakistan spy using rifles	0	1
Afghanistan	21 August 2023		Dar al-Aman, Kabul City	ISIS–K attacked an Afghan government leader and his associates using a vehicle-borne improvised explosive device	5 (claimed)	
Pakistan	26 August 2023		Mamond, Bajaur	ISIS–K assassinated a supposed Pakistani spy using a pistol	1	0
Pakistan	4 September 2023		Inayat, Bajaur	ISIS–K assassinated an alleged Pakistani spy using a pistol	1	0
Pakistan	7 September 2023		Mamond, Bajaur	An ISIS–K attacker detonated an explosive on a motorcycle carrying to Taliban killing both.	2 (claimed)	0
Afghanistan	25 September 2023		Suki, Kunar	ISIS–K assassinated a Talib using rifles	1	0
Pakistan	29 September 2023	2023 Mastung bombing	Mastung, Balochistan	A suspected ISIS–K suicide bomber detonated an explosive during an Eid Milad-ul-Nabi procession. ISIS–K did not claim responsibility	60	50–70
Pakistan	29 September 2023	Hangu mosque bombing	Hangu	One vehicle of explosives detonated at the entrance to a packed mosque, a suicide bomber detonated inside the mosque, other attackers shot at police	5	12
Afghanistan	3 October 2023		Mazar Valley, Kunar	ISIS–K assassinated a Talib using a rifle	1	0
Afghanistan	9 October 2023		Suki, Kunar	ISIS–K assassinated an alleged spy of the Afghan government using a pistol	1	0
Afghanistan	13 October 2023	2023 Pul-i-Khumri bombing	Pul-e-Khumri, Baghlan	An ISIS–K suicide bomber detonated a suicide vest in the Hazarat Shia Imam Zaman Mosque in Pul-e-Khumri, capital of Baghlan Province.	7+	15
Pakistan	24 October 2023		Salarzi, Bajaur	An attacker assassinated a reported Pakistani intelligence officer in a market using a pistol	1 (claimed)	0
Afghanistan	26 October 2023		Dasht-e-Barji, Kabul	An ISIS–K attacker detonated a suitcase bomb in a Shia gathering in Kabul City	30 (claimed)	
Pakistan	27 October 2023		Inayat, Bajaur	ISIS–K assassinated a leader of the Jamaat-ud-Dawa (affiliate of Lashkar-e-Taiba) with a pistol	1	0
Pakistan	29 October 2023		Mamond, Bajaur	ISIS–K assassinated a Talib using a pistol	1	0
Pakistan	5 November 2023		Inayat, Bajaur	ISIS–K attempted to assassinate a Pakistani spy using a pistol, wounding him	0	1 (claimed)
Pakistan	6 November 2023		Pashtakhrah, Peshawar	ISIS–K assassinated a supposed Pakistany spy using a pistol	1 (claimed)	0
Afghanistan	7 November 2023		Kabul	ISIS–K detonated an explosive planted in a Shia-filled bus in Kabul City	30 (claimed)	
Afghanistan	10 November 2023		Narnak, Kunar	ISIS–K assassinated a Talib using an explosive	1 (claimed)	0
Pakistan	11 November 2023		Mamond, Bajaur	ISIS–K detonated a suicide vest assassinating an alleged Pakistani intelligence officer	1 (claimed)	0
Pakistan	12 November 2023		Inayat, Bajaur	ISIS–K assassinated a Talib with a pistol	1 (claimed)	0
Pakistan	21 December 2023		Khar, Bajaur	ISIS–K bombed a vehicle killing a vehicle claiming to kill a Pakistani intelligence officer	1 (claimed)	0
Pakistan	21 December 2023		Mamond, Bajaur	ISIS–K detonated two explosives in Douma Dula claiming to have killed four Pakistani spies	4 (claimed)	0

== 2024 ==
Means of attack in 2024
1. Bomb (39.3%)
2. Pistol (32.1%)
3. Rifle (17.9%)
4. Suicide vest (3.57%)
5. Behead (3.57%)
6. Complex (3.57%)

As of July, ISIS–K has conducted one beheading in 2024. ISIS-K attackers abducted a man, alleged by the group to be a spy for the Afghan Taliban, in Suki District, Kunar Province, interrogated him, and beheaded him on 19 January 2024 (7 Rajab 1445 A.H.). The Islamic State published a photo of his severed head atop his corpse in the organization's weekly newsletter. The group's last beheading took place on 11 July 2022.

ISIS-K conducted two high-profile attacks during the year in Iran and Russia which earned them international attention.

Attack target types in 2024
1. Government (60.7%)
2. Civilian (35.7%)
3. Infrastructure (3.57%)
Attack locations in 2024
1. Pakistan (46.4%)
2. Afghanistan (46.4%)
3. Russia (3.57%)
4. Iran (3.57%)

Country	Date	Article	Location	Description	Dead	Injured
Afghanistan	2 January 2024		Suki, Kunar Province	ISIS–K killed a supposed spy of the Afghan government using a pistol.	1	0
Iran	3 January 2024	2024 Kerman bombings	Kerman, Kerman province	Two explosives were detonated during a commemorative ceremony marking the assassination of Qasem Soleimani at his tomb in eastern Kerman, Iran.	105	284
Afghanistan	6 January 2024		Dasht-e-Barchi, Kabul	An explosive placed inside a bus crowded with Shia Muslims detonated west of Kabul killing or injuring up to 20 Shia	20 (claimed)	
Pakistan	7 January 2024		Mamund, Bajaur	An explosive was detonated on a Pakistani police vehicle, ISIS claims to have destroyed the vehicle, killed 5, and wounded 25 others	5 (claimed)	25 (claimed)
Afghanistan	9 January 2024		Kabul	ISIS–K attackers detonated a vehicle-born improvised explosive device on a vehicle carrying employees of the Pul-e-Charki maximum security prison.	10 (claimed)	0
Afghanistan	11 January 2024		Dasht-e-Barchi, Kabul	A suspected ISIS–K member threw a grenade at civilians outside of a commercial center.	2	12
Pakistan	12 January 2024		Ali Zai, Bajaur	ISIS–K wounded a supposed Pakistani spy using a bomb.	0	1
Afghanistan	19 January 2024		Suki, Kunar Province	ISIS–K beheaded a supposed spy from the Afghan government.	1	0
Pakistan	31 January 2024		Siddiqabad, Bajaur	An independent candidate of the Pakistan Tehreek-e-Insaf (PTI) political party was assassinated shortly before the 2024 Pakistani general election	1	3
Pakistan	27 February 2024		Mamond, Bajaur	ISIS–K killed two alleged Pakistani intelligence spies with a pistol	2	0
Pakistan	5 March 2024		Bara, Khyber	ISIS–K assassinated a member of the Afghan Taliban with a pistol	1	0
Pakistan	16 March 2024		Mamond, Bajaur	ISIS–K killed a supposed Pakistani spy using a pistol	1	0
Afghanistan	21 March 2024	2024 Kandahar New Kabul Bank bombing	Police District 1, Kandahar	An ISIS–K suicide bomber detonated outside the Kabul Bank in Kandahar City. ISIS–K claimed the attack and published the attacker's alias, Muawiya Panjshiri	21+	50+
Russia	22 March 2024	Crocus City Hall attack	Krasnogorsk, Moscow Oblast	The group's first attack outside southwest Asia, at least four ISIS-K gunman attacked the Crocus City Hall concert venue and shopping mall in Krasnogorsk, with rifles and incendiaries, killing at least 143. The attack was claimed by ISIS–K.	145	551
Pakistan	25 March 2024		Suki, Kunar Province	ISIS–K detonated an explosive on a Taliban government vehicle wounding a Talib and damaging the vehicle	0	1
Pakistan	3 April 2024		Ghulam Khan, North Waziristan	ISIS-K reportedly assassinated a JuI-F politician using rifles	1	0
Pakistan	6 April 2024		Mamund, Bajaur	ISIS–K attacked Pakistani police using an unidentified explosive device	1	1
Afghanistan	9 April 2024		Qala Murad Beg, Kabul	ISIS–K detonated an explosive strapped to a fuel truck, destroying it.	0	0
Afghanistan	20 April 2024		District 6, Kabul	ISIS–K detonated an explosive strapped to a bus full of Shia Muslims.	10 (claimed)	
Afghanistan	29 April 2024		Andisheh, Guzara, Herat	An ISIS–K gunman opened fire in a Shia mosque during prayers, killing the Imam and five others.	6	1
Afghanistan	8 May 2024		Fayzabad, Badakhshan	ISIS–K detonated an explosive attached to a motorcycle beside a Taliban police convoy.	3	5
Afghanistan	17 May 2024	2024 Bamyan shooting	Bamyan	An ISIS attacker approached on foot the vehicles of a Spanish tourist group and opened fire.	7	7
Afghanistan	20 May 2024		Kandahar City, Kandahar	After surveilling bus routes, an ISIS–K attacker detonated an explosive-packed vendor van as a Taliban van passed.	6	10+
Pakistan	27 May 2024		Anayat, Bajaur	ISIS-K attackers attacked a Talib with a pistol alleging that he "had participated in the campaign against the Islamic State areas in Kunar years ago and was a guard for one of the prominent Taliban leaders."	1	0
Pakistan	31 May 2024		al-Tamarb, Karak	ISIS-K shot a member of the Jami'at Ulema-e-Islam (JUI-F) political party with a pistol claiming he supported the persecution of monotheists in the area.	1	0
Afghanistan	2 June 2024		Dawlat Yar, Ghor	ISIS-K attacked a Talib assigned to military intelligence and his purported guard using rifles and seizing the guard's weapon.	2	0
Pakistan	5 June 2024		Inayat, Bajaur	ISIS-K shot a Pakistani policeman with a pistol.	1	0
Pakistan	13 June 2024		Wana, South Waziristan	ISIS-K assassinated a political leader of the JUI-F party using rifles.	1	0
Pakistan	11 July 2024		Shalobar, Khyber District	ISIS-K killed a Pakistani policeman using a pistol.	1	0
Afghanistan	11 August 2024	2024 Kabul bus bombing	Dashte Barchi, Kabul	An explosive was detonated on a bus carrying Hazaras, west of Kabul, killing 1 civilian and injuring 13 others.	1	13
Afghanistan	2 September 2024	2024 Qala Bakhtiar bombing	Qala Bakhtiar, Kabul	An ISIS-K suicide bomber attacked a Taliban prosecution service in order to "avenge Muslims held in Taliban prisons".	6	13
Afghanistan	12 September 2024	2024 Afghanistan bus shooting	Qorodal, Daykundi	Gunmen belonging to ISIS-K targeted a bus of Hazara's returning from pilgrimage in Karbala, Iraq.	15	6
Pakistan	15 November 2024		Bajaur	Two ISIS-K militants on a motorcycle shot and killed Jamaat-e-Islami Bajaur leader Sufi Hameed while he was leaving a mosque.	1	0
Afghanistan	22 November 2024		Nahrir, Baghlan	ISIS-K gunmen opened fire on Sufi worshippers at the Sayed Pasha Agha shrine, killing 10 people.	10	0
Afghanistan	11 December 2024		Kabul	Khalil Haqqani, the Minister for Refugees and Repatriation in the Taliban government, was killed along with five others in a suicide bombing carried out by a member of the Islamic State.	6	0

== 2025 ==
Means of attack in 2025
1. Machine gun (50.0%)
2. Suicide Bombing (50.0%)

Country	Date	Article	Location	Description	Dead	Injured
Afghanistan	22 January 2025		Takhar Province	A Chinese national was killed in a shooting. ISIS-K claimed responsibility for the attack.	1	0
Pakistan	28 February 2025	2025 Darul Uloom Haqqania bombing	Akora Khattak, Nowshera District, Khyber Pakhtunkhwa, Pakistan	The attack took place during Friday prayers, resulting in the deaths of at least six individuals, including the prominent cleric and head of the seminary, Hamid Ul Haq Haqqani. Additionally, approximately 20 others sustained injuries.	8	20
Pakistan	15 April 2025	April 2025 Mastung Bus Bombing	Mastung, Balochistan, Pakistan	A bus carrying personnel from the Pakistani security forces was targeted with an improvised explosive device, resulting in the deaths of three soldiers and injuries to twenty others. The Islamic State – Khorasan Province, a regional affiliate of the Islamic State, claimed responsibility for the attack.	3	20

== 2026 ==
Country	Date	Article	Location	Description	Dead	Injured
Afghanistan	19 January 2026	Kabul Chinese Restaurant Explosion Incident	Shahr-e Naw, Kabul	A bombing detonated inside a Chinese restaurant in Kabul, killing seven people and wounding 20 more. The fatalities were identified as six Afghans and a Chinese citizen.	7	20

== See also ==
- Islamic State – Khorasan Province
- List of Islamist terrorist attacks
- List of terrorist incidents linked to the Islamic State
- Terrorist incidents in Pakistan in 2023
- List of terrorist attacks in Kabul
- Timeline of al-Qaeda attacks
