= 2023 Mastung bombing =

Suicide attack in Balochistan, Pakistan

- Part of Insurgency in Balochistan and Terrorism in Pakistan
- 2023 Mastung bombing (Balochistan, Pakistan) 2023 Mastung bombing (Pakistan)
- Location: 29°48′00″N 66°51′00″E; Mastung District, Balochistan, Pakistan
- Date: 29 September 2023
- Target: Eid Milad-ul-Nabi procession
- Attack type: Suicide bombing
- Deaths: 60
- Injuries: 50–70
- Perpetrators: Islamic State; Khorasan Province (suspected)

On 29 September 2023, a suicide bombing occurred in the Mastung District of Balochistan, Pakistan during the Eid Milad-ul-Nabi procession, which commemorates the birthday of the Islamic prophet Muhammad. The explosion took place near the Madina Mosque, causing at least 60 deaths and between 50 and 70 injuries. Among the deceased was Mastung's deputy superintendent of police, Nawaz Gashkori. This event is one of several attacks that have occurred in Balochistan over the past decade.

In the aftermath of the bombing, provincial authorities declared an emergency, dispatching rescue teams to the site. The incident was widely covered by social media, showing both the impact of the explosion and the immediate response. Various international and domestic leaders, including UN Secretary-General António Guterres, Pakistani Prime Minister Anwaar ul Haq Kakar, and President Arif Alvi, issued statements condemning the act.

As of September 2023, no group has officially claimed responsibility for the bombing. Some experts, based on the modus operandi, suspect the involvement of the Islamic State of Iraq and the Levant (ISIL).

== Background ==
Jihadists and Baloch separatists have carried out attacks for several years in Balochistan. These include major insurgent attacks in Mastung, totalling 259 deaths and 336 injuries, in 2011, 2014, 2015, 2017 and 2018.

== Bombing ==
The explosion occurred in close proximity to the Madina Mosque, where individuals were congregating for a religious procession.

The event, which included individuals waving flags and banners, took place inside a mosque affiliated with the Barelvi sect, which is typically seen as more moderate than hardline Islamic sects such as Salafism. Law enforcement authorities suspect that this was a deliberate suicide attack targeting the religious gathering, adding that the perpetrator blew himself up near the vehicle of Deputy Superintendent of Police Nawaz Gishkori who suspected the bomber and tried to stop him. In response, the area was cordoned off by law enforcement, and the casualties were transported to nearby medical facilities. An emergency was declared in the hospitals to ensure efficient medical assistance to the injured.

== Casualties ==
At least 60 deaths were reported, including children. Additionally, a substantial number of individuals were injured, with reports indicating between 50 and 70 injuries.

Among the victims of the blast was Gashkori and another senior police officer. A considerable number of those injured were in critical condition.

== Response ==
Following the blast, a state of emergency was declared by provincial officials. Rescue teams were dispatched to Mastung, and those severely injured were transported to Quetta for medical care. Videos circulating on social media showed the injured being rescued and aided by both emergency responders and local individuals.

== Reactions ==
Pakistani Prime Minister Anwaar ul Haq Kakar condemned the blast and expressed condolences for the victims. Pakistani President Arif Alvi also condemned the attack. Sarfraz Bugti, the interior minister, called it a "heinous act" and claimed that India's foreign intelligence agency, the Research and Analysis Wing, was involved in the recent terror attacks in Balochistan.

Information Minister Jan Achakzai announced a three-day mourning period in Balochistan for the victims of the attack. On 30 September, the Pakistani flag was lowered to half-mast on the Balochistan Assembly, Chief Minister's House, Governor's House, the Balochistan High Court, and other government buildings in the province.

The Organization of Islamic Cooperation (OIC) stated in response to the bombing, that the bloc stood "against all forms and manifestations of terrorism and expressed full support for Pakistan’s efforts against terrorism" and offered its deepest condolences to the victims and their families.

The Pakistani Taliban denied involvement in the incident, saying in a statement that such an attack went against its policies.

UN Secretary-General António Guterres condemned the attack adding that it was "abhorrent that these attacks targeted people during peaceful, religious ceremonies". The United States, France, the United Kingdom, Turkey, the Kingdom of Saudi Arabia, Iran, the United Arab Emirates, Iraq, and Egypt also condemned the attack.

On 1 October, the Association of Business Community Members in Balochistan shut down their shops to mourn the victims of the attack and show solidarity with their families. The provincial government announced compensation of 1.5 million rupees ($5,184) for victims of the blast.

== Responsibility ==
No group has yet claimed responsibility for the bombing. Amir Rana, director of the Pakistan Institute for Peace Studies, said the attack in Mastung and the Hangu mosque bombing – which happened a few hours afterwards – appeared to be the work of the Islamic State of Iraq and the Levant (ISIL).

== See also ==
- List of terrorist incidents linked to Islamic State – Khorasan Province
- List of terrorist incidents in 2023
- Terrorist incidents in Pakistan in 2023
