= 2021 Kunduz mosque bombing =

Suicide bombing in Kunduz, Afghanistan

- Part of the Islamic State–Taliban conflict and the 2021 Afghanistan attacks
- Kunduz (Afghanistan)
- Location: 36°43′41″N 68°52′35″E; Gozar-e-Sayed Abad Mosque, Kunduz, Afghanistan
- Date: 8 October 2021 (UTC+04:30)
- Target: Shia worshippers
- Attack type: Suicide bombing
- Deaths: 50+
- Injuries: 143
- Perpetrator: Islamic State – Khorasan Province
- Motive: Taliban support for Chinese expulsion of Uyghurs, Chinese repression of Uyghurs in Xinjiang

On 8 October 2021, an ISIS-K suicide bombing occurred at the Shia Gozar-e-Sayed Abad Mosque in the Afghan city of Kunduz. Over 50 people were killed, and another 100 injured, but according to an estimate by the United Nations Assistance Mission in Afghanistan, more than 100 people were killed and wounded.

== Background ==
Since 2015, an affiliate of the Islamic State, the Islamic State – Khorasan Province (ISIS–K), has carried out attacks in Afghanistan. The Taliban took control of Afghanistan in August 2021; ISIS–K attacks since then include a bombing at the Kabul International Airport in which 169 Afghans and 13 U.S. troops were killed.

== Explosion ==
The explosion took place during the weekly Friday noon prayer service at the Gozar-e-Sayed Abad Mosque. Witnesses stated that they were praying at the time of the explosion and noticed many bodies and blood on the floors as they were being evacuated from the scene. Bodies of the dead and injured were taken to the nearby hospital where distraught family members waited at the entrance. After the attack, smoke filled the mosque building and rose over the city. Photos and videos of the scene posted on social media showed blood splattered on the floor and walls of the mosque. The bodies of victims were also seen in uploaded medias.

== Casualties ==
An initial assessment by the United Nations Assistance Mission in Afghanistan estimated over 100 individuals may have been killed. The local Kunduz Provincial Hospital reported 35 deaths and more than 50 injuries. Twenty fatalities were reported from Médecins Sans Frontières. According to a Taliban official, there were 100 victims, adding that most were dead. The official death toll provided to media outlets is 50, and 143 others were injured. Local health officials feared the death toll could rise to as high as 80.

== Perpetrator ==
The Islamic State – Khorasan Province (ISIS-K) has claimed responsibility for the blast, and confirmed via a Telegram channel that a suicide bomber had detonated the explosive vest in the crowded mosque during Friday prayers. According to the ISIS-K, the bomber was a Uyghur who targeted both Shiites and the Taliban for their purported willingness to appease China by expelling Uyghurs. Most militant Uyghur Muslims in western China and eastern Afghanistan are believed to belong to the Turkistan Islamic Party.

== Response ==
The United Nations has condemned the attack, adding that it is part of a string of attacks at places of worship. Less than a week earlier, an attack at the Id Gah Mosque killed five people.

The Taliban security chief in Kunduz released a statement, promising to provide security to Shiite Muslims, and that such an attack "would not happen again". An inquiry into the blast was also underway, according to the deputy police chief for Kunduz province.

Ned Price, the spokesperson for the United States Department of State said the Biden administration condemned the attack, adding that the "Afghan people deserve a future free of terror".

On 15 October 2021, an ISIS–K suicide bomber killed 65 people at a Shia mosque in Kandahar.

== See also ==
- Shia Islam in Afghanistan
- List of mosques in Afghanistan
- List of terrorist incidents linked to Islamic State – Khorasan Province
