= Kabul hospital shooting =

Kabul hospital shooting may refer to:

- March 2017 Kabul attack
- May 2020 Afghanistan attacks
- 2021 Kabul hospital attack
