= Hangu mosque bombing =

2023 mass murder in Pakistan

- Date: 29 September 2023
- Venue: Mosque in Hangu, Khyber Pakhtunkhwa
- Location: Doaba, Hangu, Khyber Pakhtunkhwa, Pakistan; 33°25′35″N 70°44′25″E
- Type: Suicide bombing
- Cause: Explosive belt
- Deaths: 5
- Injuries: 5-12
- Property damage: Mosque collapsed

On 29 September 2023, a bomb exploded inside a mosque during Friday prayers in Doaba, Hangu, Khyber Pakhtunkhwa, Pakistan. The blast killed five people and injured six others. The attack occurred hours after a similar attack on a religious procession in Mastung in neighboring Balochistan Province that killed at least 50 people.

== Attack ==
A vehicle filled with explosives was stopped at the entrance of a mosque in Hangu. One of the attackers was stopped at the gate as they attempted to enter the mosque, is located within a police facility, and was unable to carry out their plan. This bombing was carried out a few hours after a similar attack in Mastung District of Balochistan. The mosque was crowded with approximately 30 to 40 worshippers at the time of the blast.

Police said two men on bikes started shooting at police personnel outside the mosque, after which one of them detonated an explosive close to the mosque’s entrance, while the other blew himself up inside the building.

== Casualties ==
The blast killed five people and critically injured six others. Several others were trapped after the mosque's roof collapsed due to the force of the explosion. Most worshippers managed to escape after hearing the first explosion. The District Police Officer (DPO) of the city confirmed that the explosion occurred within the jurisdiction of the Doaba police station.

== Response ==
Immediately following the incident, a rapid and extensive rescue operation was launched. The critically injured victims were promptly transported to nearby hospitals to receive urgent medical treatment and care.

== Investigation ==
Officials are looking into what happened. Currently, no specific group has acknowledged carrying out the attack. Amir Rana, director of the Pakistan Institute for Peace Studies, said the Mastung and Hangu mosque bombings appeared to be the work of the Islamic State of Iraq and the Levant (ISIL).

== Reactions ==
The Tehrik-e Taliban Pakistan denied involvement in the blast. Raja Pervez Ashraf, the speaker of the National Assembly, condemned the attack.

== See also ==
- List of terrorist incidents linked to Islamic State – Khorasan Province
- List of terrorist incidents in 2023
- Terrorist incidents in Pakistan in 2023
