= Jalalabad prison break =

August 2020 operation by ISIS-K

Jalalabad prison attack
- Part of the War in Afghanistan
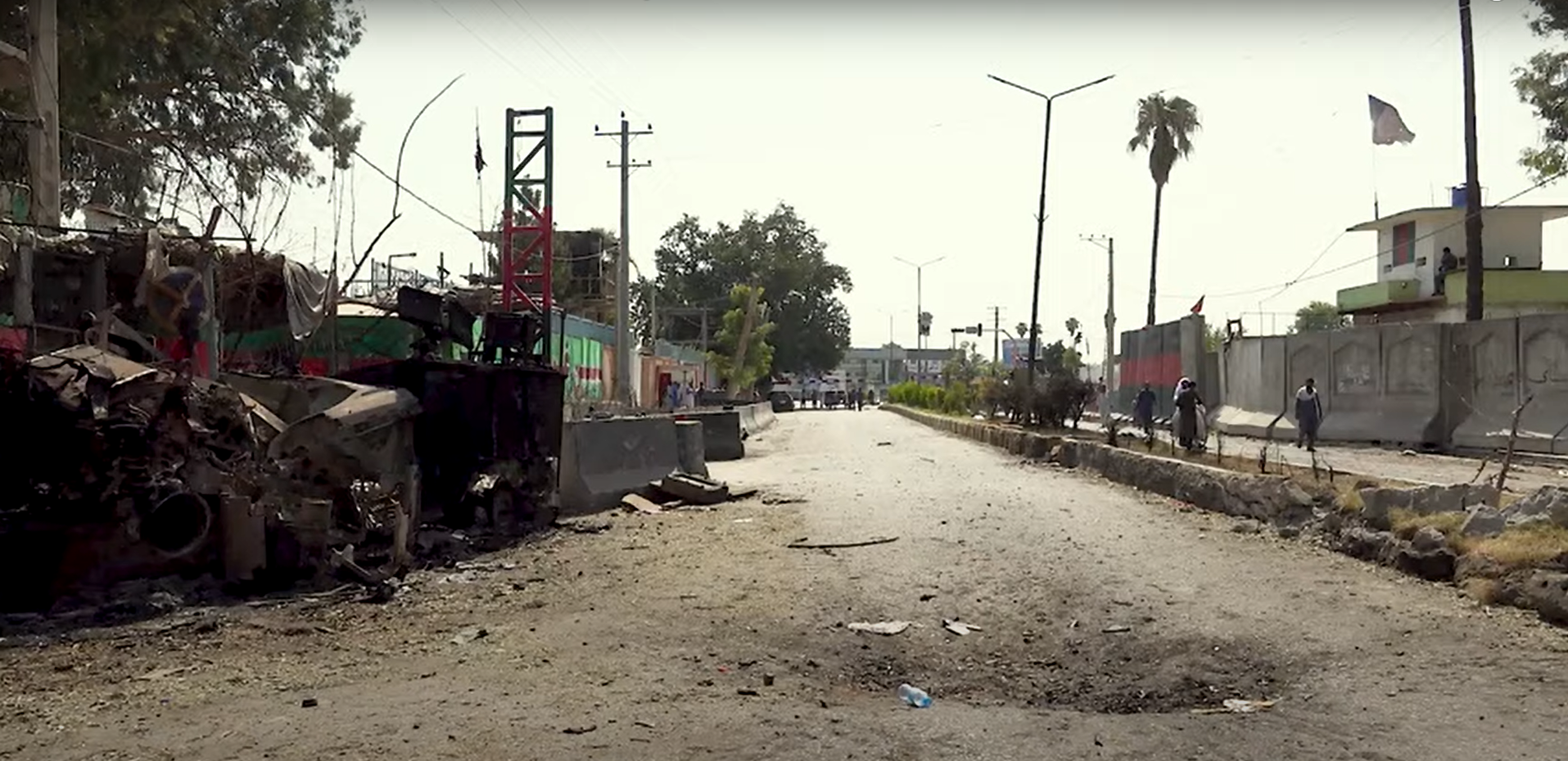
- Location: 34.4271°N 70.4652°E; Jalalabad, Nangarhar Province, Islamic Republic of Afghanistan
- Date: 2–3 August 2020
- Target: Jalalabad Prison
- Attack type: Suicide car bombing Mass shooting
- Deaths: 29
- Injuries: 50
- Perpetrator: Islamic State – Khorasan Province

The Jalalabad prison break was a coordinated attack and prison break conducted by the Islamic State – Khorasan Province (ISIS–K) on 2 August 2020 which targeted Jalalabad Prison in the provincial capital of Nangarhar Province in eastern Afghanistan. The attack, which intended to free other members of ISIS–K previously incarcerated by the Afghan government (with support from United States and NATO), has been described by counterterrorism analysts as "a highly sophisticated [...] coordinated assault" and in 2023 as "one of [ISIS–K's] most sophisticated and ambitious attacks to date."

== Operation ==
The complex and coordinated assault on Jalalabad prison was perpetrated by nine ISIS–K attackers apportioned into five separate elements: general attack, fixing, breach, raid, and IED.

=== General attack element ===
The first of five operational elements was the general attack element, which comprised three fighters, later identified by the group under the following aliases

- Abu Ali al-Pubjabi (Arabic: أبو علي البنجابي, lit. 'Ali's Father, the Punjabi')
- Hamid al-Tajiki (Arabic: حامد الطاجيكي, lit. 'Hamid the Tajik'), and
- Mawlawi Saad al-Khorasani (Arabic: مولوي سعد الخراساني, lit. 'Mawlawi Saad the Khorasani').

The general attack element was armed with two Soviet-made 7.62mm PK medium machine guns, a rocket-propelled grenade (RPG) launcher of unspecified model accompanied by fifteen RPG rounds, two sticky bombs (either magnetic or adhesive), and twenty-four hand grenades. The general attack element was tasked with establishing firing positions on a nearby root during the preparation phase, initiating the attack phase, clearing-by-fire the suicide car bomb's approach to the prison gate to enable the breach phase, and providing security to the assault element for the duration of the raid.

=== Breach element ===
The second of the five operational elements was a breaching element. The element consisted of a single attacker, identified under the alias Abu Rawaha al-Hindi by ISIS–K, who operated a vehicle-borne improvised explosive device (VBIED) packed with, what ISIS–K claimed, was "hundreds of kilograms" of explosive materials. Al-Hindi, once the path and attending personnel were cleared by the general attack element, was tasked with driving the VBIED to the prison's main gate on the south wall, and detonating it to breach the entrance, enabling the raiding element to enter the complex and free detainees.

==== Ijas Kallukettiya Purayil ====
Abu Rawaha al-Hindi (Arabic: أبو دعاء الهندي, lit. 'Rawaha's father, the Indian') was later identified by the Indian National Investigation Agency (NIA) as Ijas Kallukettiya Purayil, a doctor from Kasargod, Kerala State, in southwest India, who had been under investigation by the NIA for four years.

In July 2016, 60-year-old V.J. Sebastian Francis, a resident of Kasargod, filed a complaint with local police two months after his 30-year-old son-in-law Abdul Rashid failed to return after traveling to Mumbai, alongside his wife Sonia Sebastian (alias: Ayisha, named for Muhammad's third wife), and their two-year-old daughter, whose name has not been published. In a short period, fourteen other missing persons cases had amassed at the same police station and Kerala State Police began to investigate their disappearances, one of which included Ijas.

The investigation quickly revealed that the persons reported missing had co-conspired to leave India and join ISIS–K in eastern Afghanistan. The police were able to identify the 29-year-old Yasmeen Mohammad Zahid (resident of Jamia Nagar in New Delhi originally from Sitamarhi, Bihar) as a co-conspirator to Abdul Rashid and fundraiser for ISIS. Radicalized to Islamic jihadism, Zahid "compelled her husband to divorce her," and traveled to Ijas' home in Kasargod where she secretly attended ISIS-related training. Yasmeen was arrested on 1 August 2016 at Indira Gandhi International Airport in New Delhi attempting to flee to Afghanistan. The NIA was able to conclude that fifteen residents of Kerala had fled to Afghanistan's Nangarhar Province to join ISIS–K. A warrant was issued for Ijas on 29 September 2016 and an INTERPOL notice published in February 2017.

According to a joint NIA-INTERPOL wanted fugitive notice published on 24 February 2017, Ijas was born in Payyannur, Kannur, Kerala on 22 July 1992 to father Abdul Rahiman Parambath and mother Afsath Kallukettiya, Ijas got his family name, Kallukettiya Purayil, through matrilineal succession. His brother is Shihas.

Ijas spoke English, Malayalam, Hindi, and Urdu. Ijas obtained a Bachelor of Business Management (BBM). In mid-2016, Ijas (then 33-years-old) and Reffeala, his 26-year-old pregnant wife, traveled to Afghanistan to join ISIS–K. Successful in his task, al-Hindi was killed in the VBIED detonation breaching the main gate of Jalalabad prison.

The females from the Kerala group of ISIS–K recruits largely remain incarcerated in Kabul, Afghanistan by the Afghan Taliban government, including Sonia Sebastian (alias Ayisha), Raffeala (Ijas' wife) and her young son (born in Afghanistan), Merrin Jacob (alias Mariyam), and Nimisha (alias Fathima Isa). With their husbands dead, the Taliban sought Indian guidance for their release to the NIA, but sources differ as to whether the Indian government continues to deliberate their repatriation or has already decided against it. Raffeala is incarcerated in Badam Bagh prison in Kabul. Sonia Sebastian remains in Taliban custody in Pul-e-Charki prison in Kabul, posting an online video expressing her dissatisfaction with ISIS–K and regret in traveling to Afghanistan as her father petitions for her extradition to India.

=== Fixing element ===
The third of five operational elements was the fixing element comprising two fighters: Abu Duaa al-Hindi (Arabic: أبو دعاء الهندي, lit. 'Father of Dua, the Indian') and Khaybar al-Kabuli (Arabic: خيبر الكابلي, lit. 'Khayber, the one from Kabul'). This element was tasked to fix (prevent movement of) U.S. military forces at Forward Operating Base (FOB) Fenty using three mortars of unspecified model and 270 mortar rounds of unspecified caliber following the VBIED breach in order to prevent U.S. forces from effectively responding to the assault on Jalalabad prison.

=== Raiding element ===
The fourth and largest of the five operational elements was ISIS–K's raiding element. This element comprised five fighters:

- Qari Osama al-Khorasani (Arabic: قاري أسامة الخراساني), from Khorasan
- Abu Omar al-Tajiki (Arabic: أبو عمر الطاجيكي), a Tajik
- Ismail al-Tajiki (Arabic: إسماعيل الطاجيكي), a Tajik
- Idris al-Tajiki (Arabic: إدريس الطاجيكي), a Tajik, and
- Dr. Abu Hayyan al-Hindi (Arabic: الدكتور أبو حيان الهندي), an India.

The raiding element, was tasked with infiltration (following the VBIED breach), breaching of individual buildings, killing security personnel and prison guards, explosively destroying the guard towers, freeing detainees, guiding detainees out of the prison, and burning the remaining facilities. The raiding element was armed with one automatic rifle each (five total), five 'explosive devices', two 'sticky bombs', an RPG launcher with five RPG rounds, and a total of 45 hand grenades.

=== IED element ===
The fifth element of the operation was an improvised explosive device (IED) element comprising two fighters (unnamed), and provided with seven constructed IEDs. The IED element was tasked with laying the seven IEDs along the road near Jalalabad prison and detonating those IEDs to deny responding American and Afghan forces access to the prison while the raiding element was conducting operations within.

=== Execution ===
The planned ISIS–K operation commenced during the evening of 2 August 2020 (Sunday, 12 Dhu al-Hijja 1441 A.H.) and was conducted in three distinct operational phases (preparation, attack, breach, raid).

During the preparation phase, the 3-member general attack element established itself in a firing position atop a building overlooking the Jalalabad prison while the 2-member IED team laid and concealed their seven devices along expected U.S. and Afghan avenues of approach and the 2-member fixing element established a firing point from which it could mortar FOB Fenty and fix U.S. forces positioned there.

The attack phase began with the 3-member general attack element opening fire on security personnel at Jalalabad prison using their PK medium machine guns, RPGs, sticky bombs, and hand grenades, clearing security personnel from above and outside the main gate.

In the short breach phase, the single-occupant VBIED advanced to the gate and detonated, breaching the main gate and further disabling the overhead guard tower, enabling the raiding force to enter the prison complex.

Following the VBIED breach, the raiding element entered into Jalalabad prison through the breach in the main gate and exterior wall, initiating the raid phase of the operation. During this time, the raiding element began to engage both security forces and prison guards within the complex using a combination of automatic rifle fire and an excess of hand grenades. As fighters from the raiding elements reached individual buildings within the complex, they used explosives to breach walls and doorways and eventually set free many detainees, some of which included ISIS–K fighters, Taliban fighters, and other miscellaneous criminals. Simultaneously, the fixing element began to lob mortar shells at FOB Fenty in an attempt to prevent U.S. military forces from effectively organizing and moving to respond to the ongoing attack on Jalalabad prison. Also during the raiding phase, the ISIS–K IED element detonated the pre-laid devices in order to deny Afghan and U.S. military forces access to the prison.

The ensuing battle between government forces and the ISIS–K general attack, IED, and raiding elements lasted for approximately 20 hours, eventually killing all present ISIS–K fighters and a number of the 1,793 inmates housed at the prison. During the attack, ISIS–K managed to free 1,025 prisoners of whom 270 remain were never recaptured.

== Analysis ==
According to the book The Islamic State in Afghanistan and Pakistan: Strategic Alliances and Rivalries by analysts Amira Jadoon and Andrew Mines, the complex operation provided ISIS–K a significant boost in appeal to the Islamic State's sympathizers and reinforced the reputation of the group's newly appointed leader, Shahab al-Muhajir, who continues as the group's longest-serving head (wali) and whose last two predecessors were dismissed for poor performance and arrested by the Afghan government, respectively.

== See also ==
- List of terrorist incidents linked to Islamic State – Khorasan Province
- 2013 attack on Indian consulate in Jalalabad
- List of prisons in Afghanistan
- List of terrorist incidents linked to ISIL
- Sarposa prison attack of 2008
- Save the Children Jalalabad attack
