= 2021 Kandahar bombing =

Suicide bombing in Kandahar, Afghanistan

- Part of 2021 Afghanistan attacks and Persecution of Shias by the Islamic State
- Kandahar (Afghanistan)
- Location: 31°37′12″N 65°42′57″E; Imam Bargah Mosque, Kandahar, Afghanistan
- Date: 15 October 2021
- Target: Shia worshippers
- Attack type: Suicide bombing
- Deaths: 65
- Injuries: 70+
- Perpetrator: ISIS–K

On 15 October 2021, a suicide bombing occurred at the Imam Bargah Mosque, also known as Fatima Mosque, a Shia mosque, during Friday prayers in Kandahar, Afghanistan, killing at least 65 people and wounding more than 70.

== Attacks ==
Around 13:00 local time, 4 bombers arrived at the mosque gate, where two of them blew up their explosives, making way for their accomplices, who continued the terrorist attack among the approximately 3,000 worshippers inside the mosque, detonating two more bombs.

The attacks came a week after a bombing claimed by the Islamic State – Khorasan Province at a Shia mosque in Kunduz killed 46 people. Following the Kunduz attack, the Taliban government had promised to provide security at Shia mosques as well as expressed its condolences to the families of the victims and promised to bring the perpetrators to justice.

== Perpetrator ==
The Islamic State – Khorasan Province claimed responsibility for the attack according to a statement released by the group's media wing, Amaq.

== See also ==
- List of terrorist incidents linked to Islamic State – Khorasan Province
