= 2023 Kabul airport bombing =

2023 explosion in Kabul

- Part of the Islamic State–Taliban conflict
- Location: 34°33′35″N 69°13′15″E; Hamid Karzai International Airport, Kabul, Afghanistan
- Date: 1 January 2023; 3 years ago
- Target: Taliban members
- Attack type: Bombing
- Deaths: 20
- Injuries: 30
- Perpetrator: Islamic State - Khorasan Province

On 1 January 2023, a bombing at a checkpoint outside the military airport in Kabul, located about 200 metres from the civilian Kabul International Airport in Afghanistan killed and injured several people. The following day, the Islamic State claimed responsibility for the bombing on Telegram, claiming to have killed 20 people and injured 30. The Taliban-run ministry of interior denied those numbers, saying it would be releasing an official toll.

== See also ==
- List of terrorist incidents linked to Islamic State – Khorasan Province
- 2021 Kabul airport attack
- List of terrorist attacks in Kabul
- List of terrorist incidents in 2023
- List of massacres in Afghanistan
