= August 2017 Herat mosque attack =

Suicide bombing in Herat, Afghanistan

2017 Herat Mosque attack
- Part of War in Afghanistan (2015-present)
- Herat (Afghanistan)
- Location: 34°21′10.31″N 69°12′14.50″E; Jadwadia mosque, Herat, Afghanistan
- Date: August 1, 2017; 20:00 (UTC + 04:30)
- Target: Shi'ite worshipers
- Attack type: Suicide bombing, Shooting
- Weapons: Explosive belt, Assault rifle
- Deaths: 33 (+2 attackers)
- Injuries: 66
- Victim: Shi'ites
- No. of participants: 2

On August 1, 2017, two suicide bombers entered a Shi'ite mosque named "Jadwadia" in Bekrabad, Herat, Afghanistan, during an evening prayer session. After throwing explosives into the crowd, one of the two men detonated his vest. The remaining attacker continued firing on the crowd before detonating his vest as well. The attack caused 33 deaths and left 66 people injured. No group has claimed responsibility for the attack.

== Attack ==
At around 20:00 (UTC + 04:30) in Bekrabad, two men, one of them wearing a suicide vest and the other armed with a rifle, entered the mosque which was hosting more than 300 people at the time. They threw hand grenades and fired on the worshipers before one of the suicide bombers detonated his bomb. The other attacker continued firing into the crowd until he too detonated his bomb. Twenty-nine people were killed while 64 others were injured. "The mosque was badly damaged with windows blown out, walls and even the large dome peppered with shrapnel and everywhere was blood from the victims", said Hadid, an eyewitness.

== Responsibility ==
No groups have claimed responsibility for the attack. A spokesman for the Taliban, Qari Mohammad Yousuf, said the Taliban were not involved in this incident.

== See also ==
- List of terrorist incidents linked to Islamic State – Khorasan Province
