= 2023 Pul-i-Khumri bombing =

Suicide bombing in Afghanistan

- Part of Persecution of Shias by the Islamic State
- Pul-i-Khumri (Afghanistan)
- Location: Imam Zaman Mosque, Pul-i-Khumri, Baghlan, Afghanistan
- Date: 13 October 2023
- Target: Shia worshippers
- Attack type: Suicide bombing
- Deaths: 7
- Injuries: 17
- Perpetrator: Islamic State – Khorasan Province

On 13 October 2023, a suicide bombing occurred at Shia Imam Zaman Mosque in Pul-i-Khumri, Baghlan, Afghanistan. At least 7 people were killed, and 15 wounded in the attack.

== Explosion ==
During the Friday prayers, a bomb exploded in Imam Zaman mosque. Some of the injured were treated at Pul-i-Khumri Hospital, while others were transferred to Kunduz hospital for treatment. ISIS–K claimed responsibility for the attack, identifying the bomber as "Sayfullah al-Muwahhid".

== See also ==
- List of terrorist incidents linked to Islamic State – Khorasan Province
