= Save the Children Jalalabad attack =

2018 terrorist attack in Afghanistan

2018 Save The Children Jalalabad attack
- Jalalabad (Afghanistan)
- Location: Jalalabad, Afghanistan
- Date: 24 January 2018
- Attack type: Suicide car bombing, shooting
- Deaths: 6
- Injuries: 27
- Perpetrator: Islamic State of Iraq and the Levant – Khorasan Province

On 24 January 2018, militants affiliated with Islamic State of Iraq and the Levant – Khorasan Province launched a bomb and gun attack on a Save the Children office in Jalalabad, a city in the eastern Afghan province of Nangarhar, killing six people and injuring 27.

== Background ==
Save the Children is a British non-governmental organization (NGO) that provides aid to children in developing countries through healthcare, education, and economic initiatives. The group has been active in Afghanistan since 1976 and as of 2018 has programs active in sixteen of the country's thirty-four provinces. Charity groups like Save the Children are frequent targets for militant groups in Afghanistan. For example, in May 2017 a Swedish NGO in Kabul, Operation Mercy, was the target of an attack that left two people dead, and in 2010, ten members of an international eye care team were shot and killed by Taliban militants in the country's Nuristan Province.

== Attack ==
Shortly after 9:00am local time on 24 January 2018, a suicide bomber in a car detonated his explosives at the front of the Save the Children compound. The blast was followed up by at least four armed militants attempting to storm the building, according to witnesses some of the attackers were wearing Afghan police uniforms. A firefight broke out between Afghan security forces and the attackers that lasted more than eight hours. 45 people in the compound had to be rescued by commandos. All the attackers were killed and six civilians, including three Save the Children employees, were killed with at least 27 people, including three Afghan troops, injured.

== Responsibility ==
The Taliban denied responsibility for the attack. ISIL claimed responsibility, saying it was targeting Western institutions. In the aftermath of the attack, Save the Children suspended its operations in Afghanistan.

== See also ==
- List of terrorist incidents linked to Islamic State – Khorasan Province
