= Inayat Killi =

Coordinates: 34°45′N 71°27′E

- Town
- Location in Pakistan Inayat Killi (Pakistan)
- Country: Pakistan
- Region: Federally Administered Tribal Areas
- District: Bajaur Agency
- Tehsil: Khar Bajaur

Population (2017)
  - Total: 10,717
- Time zone: UTC+5 (PST)
  - Summer (DST): UTC+6 (PDT)

Inayat Killi (or Inayat Qilla) is a town in Khar Bajaur Tehsil, Bajaur Agency, Federally Administered Tribal Areas, Pakistan. The population is 10,717 according to the 2017 census.
