= 2021 Kabul airport attack =

Suicide bombing at Kabul airport, Afghanistan

- Part of the Islamic State–Taliban conflict, the 2021 Kabul airlift and the war on terror
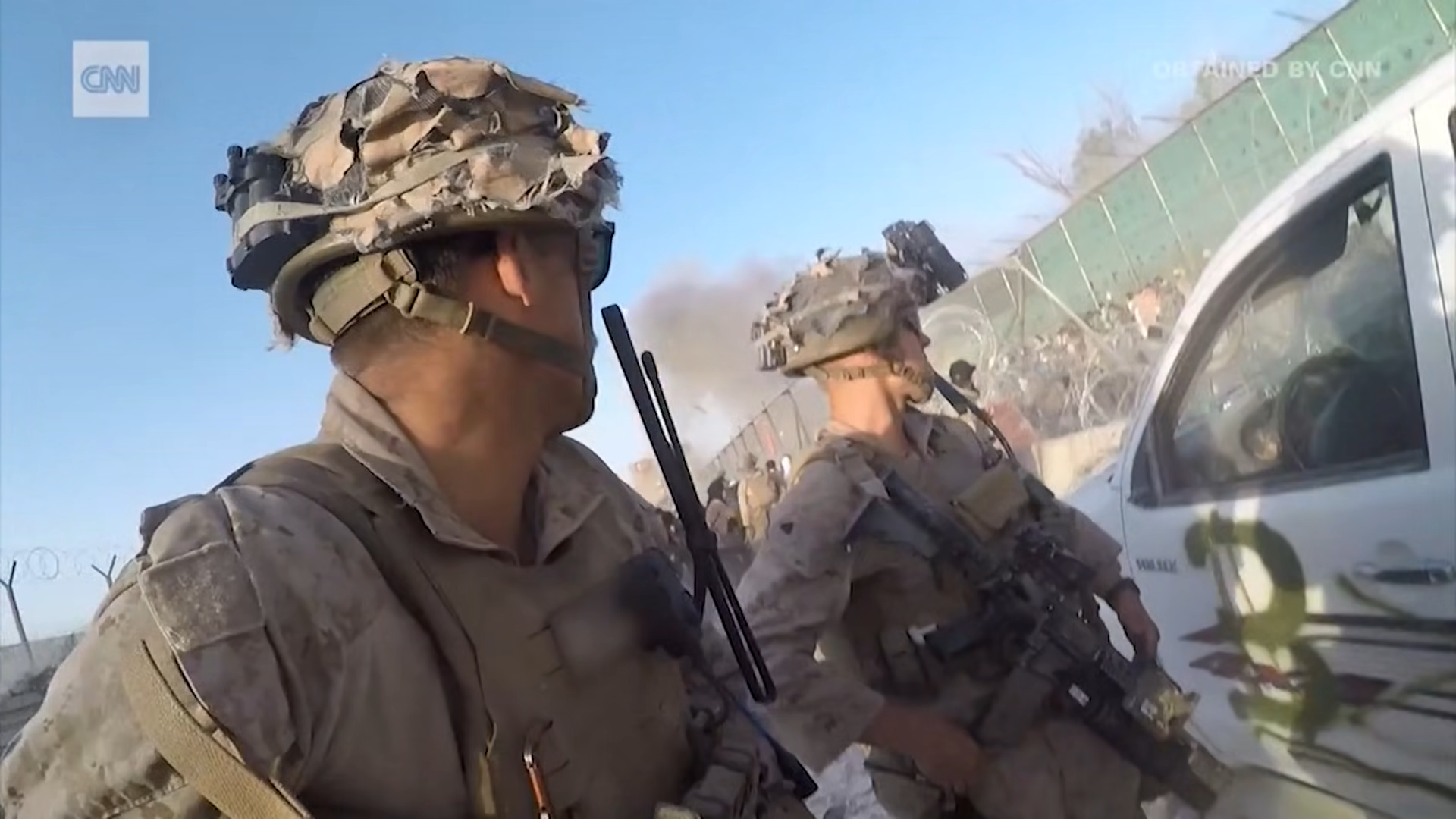
- United States Marines reacting immediately after the explosion
- Location: 34°33′31″N 69°13′13″E; Hamid Karzai International Airport, Kabul, Afghanistan
- Date: 26 August 2021; 17:50 (UTC+04:30)
- Target: Afghan civilians, foreign troops, and Taliban members
- Attack type: Suicide bombing
- Deaths: 182 (including the perpetrator)
- Injuries: 150+
- Perpetrator: Islamic State – Khorasan Province
- Assailant: Abdul Rahman al-Logari
- Defenders: Taliban; United States; United Kingdom
- Accused: Mohammad Sharifullah

A suicide bombing took place at Hamid Karzai International Airport in Kabul, Afghanistan, on 26 August 2021, at 17:50 local time (13:20 UTC), during the evacuation from Afghanistan. At least 182 people were killed, including 169 Afghan civilians and 13 members of the United States military, the first American military casualties in the war in Afghanistan since February 2020. The Islamic State – Khorasan Province (ISIS–K) claimed responsibility for the attack.

On 27 August, the United States launched an unmanned airstrike which the U.S. Central Command (USCENTCOM) said was against three suspected ISIS–K members in Nangarhar Province. On 29 August, the US conducted a second drone strike in Kabul, targeting a vehicle which they suspected was carrying ISIS–K members, but actually carried an Afghan aid worker. Ten Afghan civilians were killed in the drone strike, including seven children.

In 2023, the (unnamed) leader of the ISIS–K cell that organized the attack was believed to have been killed by Taliban security forces.

== Background ==
After the fall of Kabul to the Taliban on 15 August 2021, Hamid Karzai International Airport was the only way out of Afghanistan. Security concerns grew after hundreds of members of the Islamic State – Khorasan Province escaped from jails at Bagram and Pul-e-Charkhi. On 16 August, the Pentagon warned the U.S. Congress about the increased threat of a terrorist attack by ISIS following the fall of Kabul the previous day. U.S. President Joe Biden received multiple reports of a possible attack during the week preceding the attack, and warned on 22 August in remarks from the White House that the longer U.S. troops remained in the country, the greater the threat that ISIS would pose to American personnel and civilians near the airport.

Hours before the attack, U.S. diplomats in Kabul warned American citizens to leave the airport because of security threats. United Kingdom Armed Forces Minister James Heappey had also warned of a highly credible threat of attack at the airport by ISIS militants. The embassies of the United States, the United Kingdom and Australia also warned about high-security threats involving the airport.

== Attack ==
Amid the 2021 evacuation from Afghanistan, a crowd of local and foreign civilians fled to the airport to be evacuated. At Abbey Gate, one of the gates into the airport, a suicide bomber detonated an explosive belt. After the explosion, gunfire erupted and all gates to the airport were closed. U.S. officials said that ISIS–K gunmen opened fire into the crowd after the explosion and U.S. troops returned fire. In 2026, Gunnery Sergeant Jonathan Eby, Lance Corporal Jordan Houston, and Corporal Michael Gretzon were each awarded a Bronze Star Medal with "V" device for valor for returning fire against the ISIS-K gunmen. According to several reporters, eyewitnesses attributed at least some of the gunfire into the crowd and consequent deaths after the explosion to panic by U.S. troops. The Pentagon acknowledged the possibility of U.S. responsibility for some deaths at a news conference on 28 August.

The explosion occurred by a canal where U.S. forces were checking evacuees' travel documents before allowing them into the airport. An eyewitness stated that the explosion felt as if someone had pulled the ground from under his feet, and he saw other evacuees thrown into the air by the force of the blast. Initial reports erroneously stated that a second explosion had taken place at the nearby Baron Hotel. The following day, it was confirmed that there had been no second explosion.

ISIS–K, who claimed responsibility for the attack, named the bomber as Abdul Rahman al-Logari. The Taliban had fought against IS–KP previously, and were helping the U.S. forces to maintain security at the airport.

== Victims ==
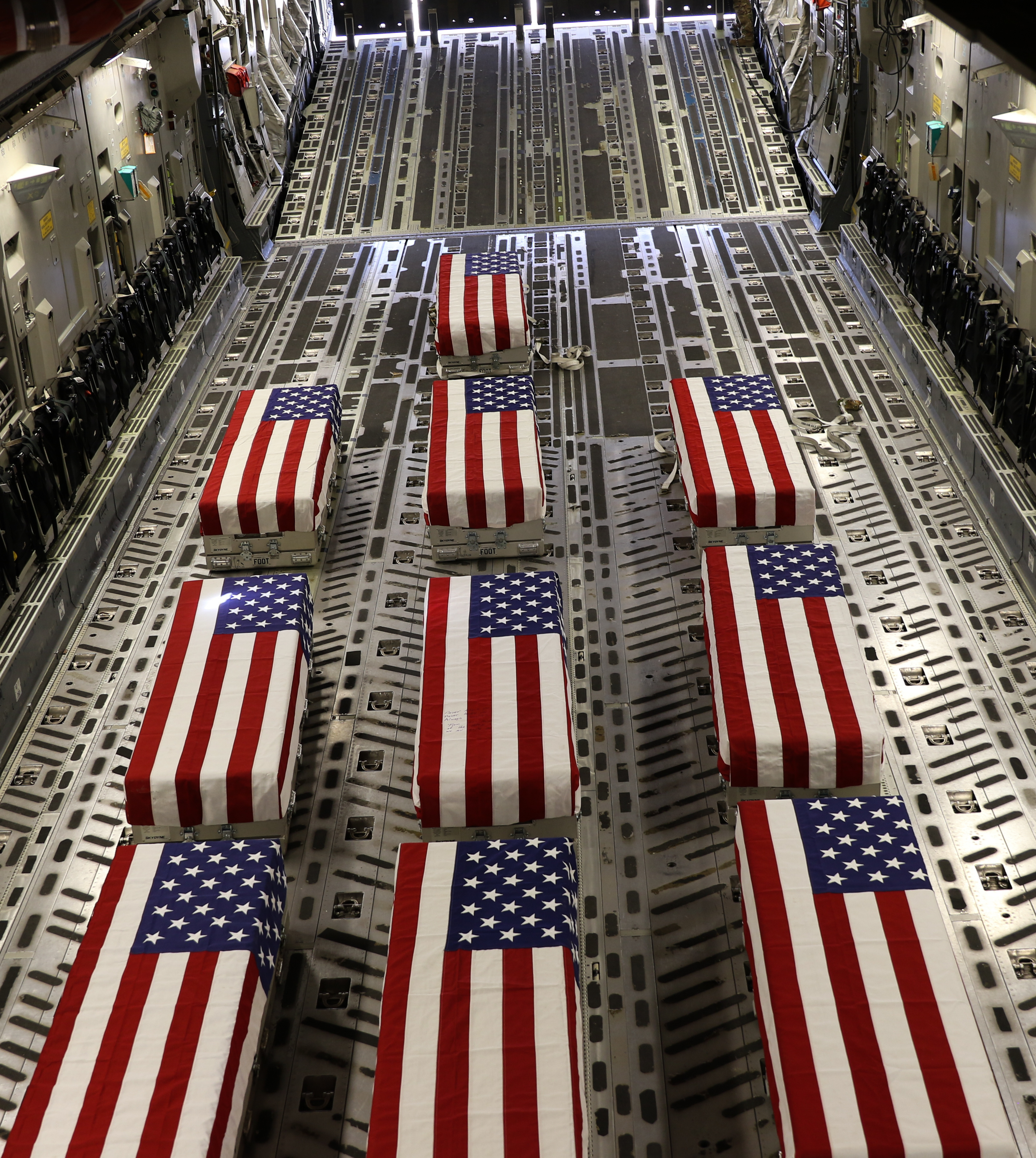
Remains of U.S. service members aboard a military transport plane at Hamid Karzai International Airport, 27 August 2021

At least 182 people were killed during the attack, including 169 Afghan civilians, and 13 U.S. service members supporting the evacuation operation. Two of the killed civilians were British dual-nationals and one was the child of a British national. It was initially reported that 28 Taliban fighters had also been killed in the attack, but this was later denied by Taliban spokesman Zabiullah Mujahid in an interview with Radio Free Europe/Radio Liberty. The dead Americans were identified as eleven marines, one soldier from 8th Psychological Operations Group, and one Navy corpsman. The American deaths were the first U.S. service deaths in Afghanistan since February 2020 and were the largest single loss of life of U.S. military personnel since the 2011 Afghanistan Boeing Chinook shootdown.

At least 150 more people were injured, including 18 U.S. military personnel and a number of Taliban members.

== Reactions and response ==
Through a tweet by their spokesperson, the Taliban condemned the attack, saying "evil circles will be strictly stopped". The Taliban later announced that they would take every possible measure to capture ISIS–K leader, Shahab al-Muhajir. Abdullah Abdullah, former Chief Executive of Afghanistan and National Coalition of Afghanistan leader, condemned the attack. Some civilians claimed to reporters that the attack had strengthened their resolve to leave the country for fear of more attacks.

U.S. President Biden made a public address following the attack. He honored the U.S. service members who were killed, calling them "heroes" and saying they lost their lives "in the service of liberty", and also expressed deep sorrow for the Afghan victims. Biden said to those who wished harm upon the U.S. that "we will hunt you down and make you pay". The United Kingdom government also said that they will continue Operation Pitting, the evacuation from Afghanistan.

Many nations expressed condemnation for the Kabul airport attack and solidarity with the victims and troops conducting evacuations at the airport. (Note: They include Australia, Canada, China, Denmark, Finland, France, Hungary, India, Indonesia, Iran, Israel, Kazakhstan, Malaysia, New Zealand, Norway, Poland, Romania, Russia, Turkey, Ukraine, the United Kingdom, the United States, and Vietnam.) The attack was also condemned by the European Commission and the United Nations. German Chancellor Angela Merkel cancelled a planned trip to Israel, instead staying in Germany to monitor the evacuation of German troops. Biden also rescheduled a meeting with visiting Israeli Prime Minister Naftali Bennett because of the attack. The United Kingdom said civilian evacuations would continue in spite of the attack.

During the 2024 State of the Union Address the father of Kareem Nikoui, who was killed by the bombing at the 2021 Kabul airport attack, was arrested within the United States Capitol for "heckling" during the speech.

=== U.S. airstrikes ===
On 27 August, the United States launched an airstrike against what U.S. military said was a vehicle carrying three ISIS–K members in Nangarhar Province. Two were killed, who were described by Pentagon Press Secretary John Kirby as "high-profile ISIS targets" and "planners and facilitators"; the third occupant of the vehicle was injured. A U.S. defence official said that one of the strike targets was "associated with potential future attacks at the airport", and that the U.S. had located him with "sufficient knowledge" to strike. CENTCOM identified him on 23 September as Kabir Aidi (alias "Mustafa"), and stated that he was involved in planning attacks and making magnetic IEDs. It also stated that he was directly involved with the orchestrators of the bombing and was reportedly helping distribute explosives and suicide vests to target people during the evacuation. The second person killed in the strike was identified as an ISIS collaborator who had been involved in the 2020 Kabul University attack, but his identity was not known.

On 29 August, a drone strike was carried out by the United States, targeting a vehicle a few kilometers from Kabul Airport. According to relatives, 10 nearby civilians were killed, including seven children. Some of those killed had worked for international organisations and held visas allowing them U.S. entry. U.S. officials said there were a number of explosions following the drone strike, implying explosives at the scene, however victims relatives rejected that any subsequent explosions had occurred and stated the driver of the car did not have any connection with the group. A preliminary investigation conducted into the 29 August drone strike by the American military said the targeted vehicle had visited what was believed to be a safe house for ISIS–K by intelligence analysts. It however found no concrete proof that there were explosives inside, though stating it was "possible to probable", and a commander had given the order after seeing no civilians on live feed, only for them to appear a few seconds later.

An investigation conducted by The New York Times however found that the targeted driver, identified as Zemari Ahmadi, was an aid worker for Nutrition and Education International, and that his movements that raised the military's suspicion, was him picking up and later dropping off his office colleagues. It also reported that the packages which were believed to be explosives might have simply been water containers, and there was no evidence of secondary explosions. The newspaper stated that the actual number of dead was 10 people, including 7 children.

Another investigation by The Washington Post reached similar conclusions, with two experts stating that there may have been a smaller secondary explosion due to fuel vapors, which would have appeared more powerful than it actually was, causing the military to believe the vehicle contained explosives. A former US Air force operator claimed the damage was consistent with the car containing explosives.

On 17 September, the head of USCENTCOM Kenneth McKenzie confirmed it was unlikely any ISIS–K members were killed in the 29 August drone strike. The Secretary of Defense Lloyd Austin and Chairman of the Joint Chiefs of Staff Mark Milley confirmed all of those killed in the strike were innocent civilians. The investigation by the United States military also concluded that a supposed secondary explosion they believed to be evidence of explosives, might have been due to a propane or gas tank. A CNN report revealed that the Central Intelligence Agency had warned the military of civilians in the area after they fired the missile and only seconds before it struck.

==== Reactions to the airstrikes ====
After the drone strike on 27 August, U.S. President Joe Biden said they had pursued those responsible for the attack on the airport as he had previously said they would, and they would continue to do so.

The Council on American–Islamic Relations, Code Pink and Amnesty International condemned the 29 August drone strike, calling it a continuation of American policy of killing civilians without accountability. Amnesty further called for "a credible and transparent investigation" into the strike, acknowledgment by the United States for its actions and reparations for the deceased, and adherence to international law by the United States. U.S. House Representative Ilhan Omar also condemned the strike on Twitter.

Mark Milley defended the strike on 1 September as "righteous" after doubts were raised about it, while claiming one of the persons killed in it was an ISIS–K member and they had followed due procedure. He admitted that others were killed in the strike. White House Press Secretary Jen Psaki on 2 September acknowledged that civilians had been killed in the strike and stated that an investigation was ongoing. After the publishing of journalistic reports casting doubt on the military's account, Pentagon spokesman John Kirby on 13 September defended the strike, saying it prevented an attack on the airport.

After the U.S. military confirmed that the drone strike had killed innocent civilians, House Representative Ruben Gallego termed the admission "devastating" and called on the Department of Defense to brief the House of Representatives on it as soon as they could. A relative of the victim meanwhile stated that an apology was not enough and that the United States must punish the person responsible for the strike, offer compensation, and evacuate some members of the family out of Afghanistan.

=== Challenge to Pentagon's account of Kabul Airport attack ===
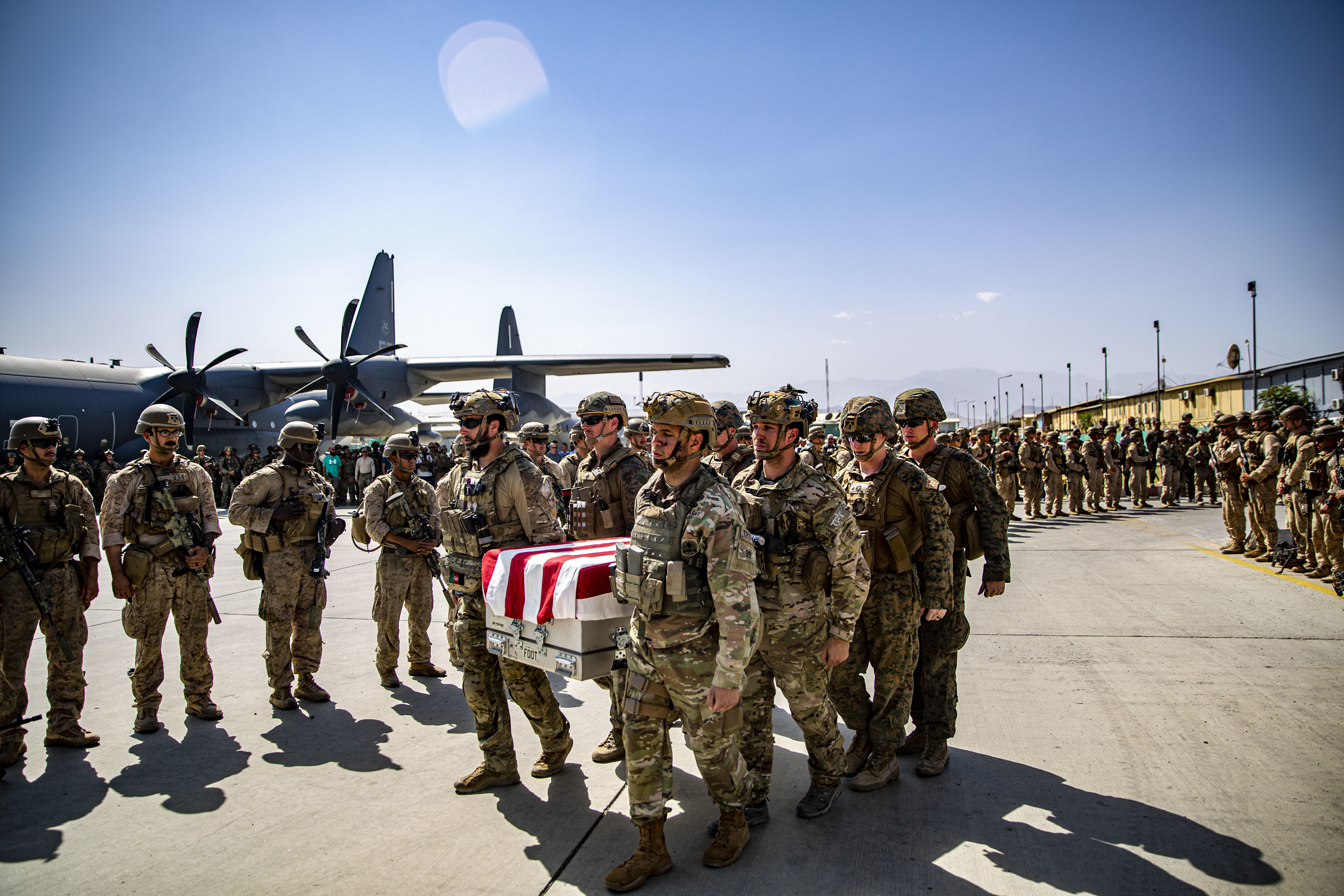
Joint Task Force-Crisis Response personnel carrying the remains of fellow service members killed in the airport attack, 27 August 2021

In April 2024, CNN reported on newly disclosed video footage from a Marine's GoPro camera. This footage revealed extensive gunfire following the explosion, that CNN reported was contrary to Pentagon accounts of minimal gunfire. Eyewitnesses, including U.S. military personnel and an Afghan doctor, corroborated that the gunfire was extensive and resulted in multiple injuries, a claim supported by the video showing 11 instances of gunfire over four minutes. CNN reported that, the Pentagon upheld its findings from 2021 and 2023 investigations, which attributed all casualties to the suicide bombing and maintained that no civilians were hit by coalition gunfire.

== Aftermath ==
In April 2023, the primary plotter behind the attack was killed by the Taliban.

In March 2025, President Trump announced during his joint address to the congress that Pakistan had arrested a "top terrorist" involved in the planning and spotting and was on the "way here to face the swift sword of American justice". Mohammad Sharifullah, also known as "Jafar", was charged with providing and conspiring to provide material support and resources to a designated foreign terrorist organization resulting in death. American officials claimed that Sharifullah, who was also linked to the Crocus City Hall attack in 2024, had planned al-Logari's route into the airport. His trial opened on 21 April 2026. On 16 September 2026, Sharifullah was sentenced to 20 years in prison for providing material support to ISIS-K, but jurors could not agree whether he bore any responsibility for the Kabul airport bombing.

== See also ==
- List of terrorist incidents linked to Islamic State – Khorasan Province
- 2023 Kabul Airport attack
- List of terrorist attacks in Kabul
