= 2021 Kabul hospital attack =

- Part of Islamic State–Taliban conflict
- Kabul (Kabul) Kabul (Afghanistan)
- Location: Kabul, Afghanistan
- Date: 2 November 2021
- Target: Daoud Khan Military Hospital
- Deaths: 25+(+5)
- Injuries: 50+
- Perpetrator: Islamic State – Khorasan Province

On 2 November 2021, a major insurgent attack at the Sardar Mohammad Daoud Khan Military Hospital in Kabul, Afghanistan, killed at least 25 people.

== Background ==
Islamic State began an insurgency in Afghanistan in 2015. They claimed responsibility for a 2017 attack on Daoud Khan hospital.

== Attack ==
On 2 November 2021, bombers and gunmen attacked Daoud Khan Military Hospital in Kabul, Afghanistan. A suicide bomber on a motorcycle detonated his explosives at the gate of the hospital, followed by four attackers. The attackers stormed the hospital and killed multiple people, including Mawlawi Hamdullah Mukhlis, leader of the Kabul Corps of the Islamic Army of Afghanistan. The attack was followed by a second, more powerful explosion at the same gate. Taliban commando then arrived via helicopter and engaged in a firefight with the Islamic State gunmen, leading to the deaths of all the attackers. The attack killed at least 25 people and wounded 50 more.

== Responsibility ==
The Islamic State – Khorasan Province claimed responsibility for the attack.

== See also ==
- List of terrorist incidents linked to Islamic State – Khorasan Province
- List of terrorist attacks in Kabul
