= Dashte Barchi =

Dasht-e-Barchi دشت برچی
- Municipal District
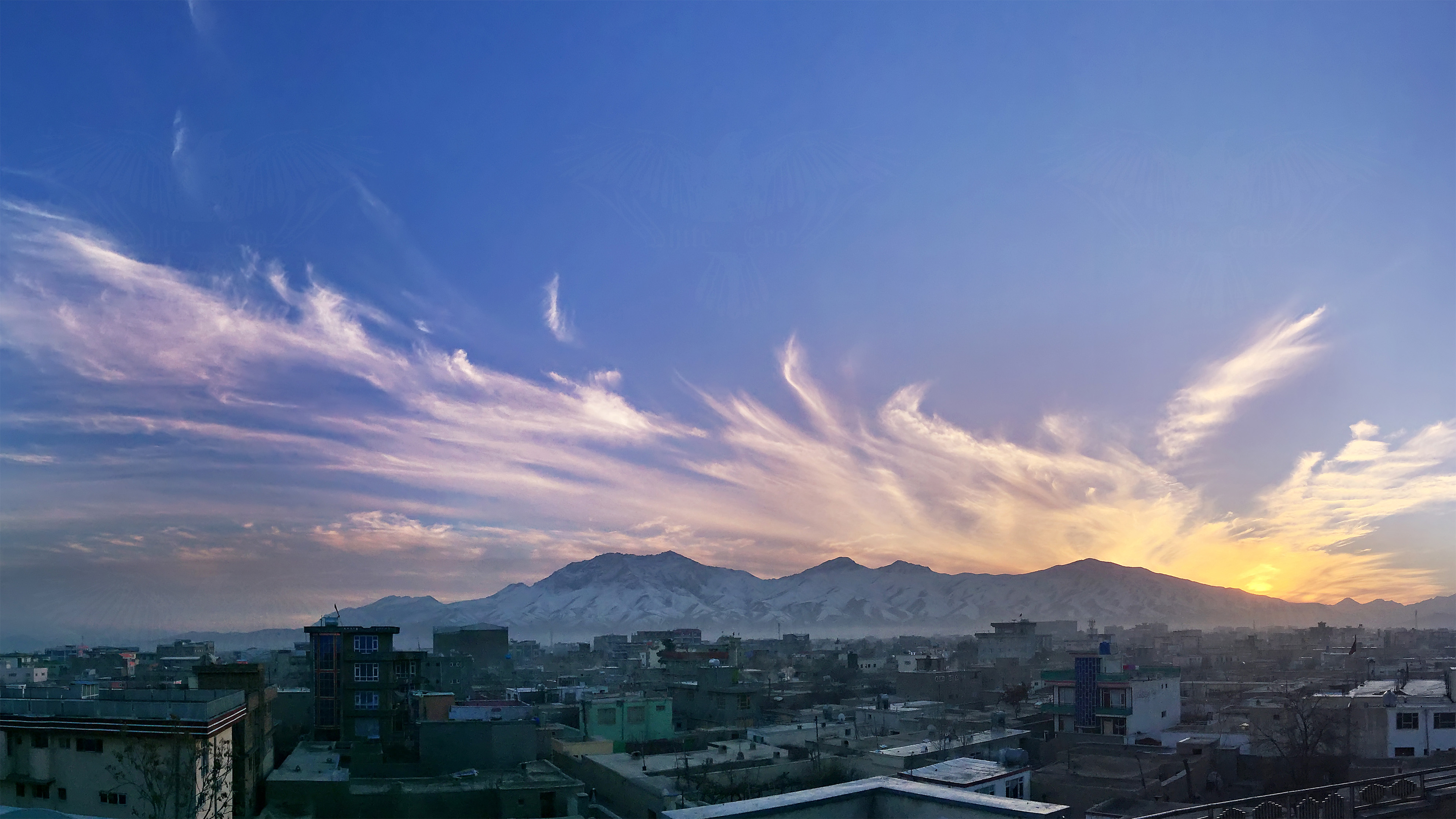
- View of Dashte Barchi

- Coordinates: 34.49467°N 69.09422°E
- Country: Afghanistan
- Province: Kabul
- District: Kabul
- City: Kabul
- Hawza/Nahia: 13

Area
  - Total: 46.6 km^{2} (18.0 sq mi)

Dimensions
  - Length: 6.8 km (4.2 mi)
  - Width: 3.7 km (2.3 mi)

Population (2025)
  - Total: 317,097
  - Density: 6,800/km^{2} (17,600/sq mi)
- Time zone: UTC+04:30 (Afghanistan Time)

Dasht-e-Barchi (Pashto; Dari: دشت برچی) is a neighborhood in the western section of Kabul, Afghanistan. It is within the jurisdiction of Municipal District 13 (Nahia 13) and has an estimated population of 317,097 people.

Previously barren with some farmlands, the neighborhood began to be developed by the Kabul Municipality in the 2000s. Many natives of Bamyan, Daikundi, Ghazni, Maidan Wardak, Parwan and other provinces settled in Barchi. Some returned from Iran, Pakistan, Turkey and other countries. Majority of them are Hazaras. For this reason the neighborhood has been targeted by anti-Shia extremists, most notably by Islamic State – Khorasan Province (ISKP).

== History ==
Dashte Barchi literally translates to "desert of the porters". It was named due to its use as a respite for Hazara laborers transporting goods into Kabul. It was historically a remote and underpopulated area, with few government buildings or military installations.

During the drought in Afghanistan in the late 1990s, Dasht-e Barchi saw a massive influx of Hazara migrants from rural enclaves, most notably Behsud, Bamyan, and Jaghori. The Taliban's repression of the Hazaras was another reason for the mass migration. The majority of Hazaras now living in Dashte Barchi may still be considered internally displaced persons.

Dasht-e Barchi saw comparatively little violence during the Afghan civil war, and suicide attacks remained rare in the 2000s, even as the rest of Kabul experienced these attacks with relative frequency.

Some Hazaras who had fled to Iran during the decades of war resettled in Dashte Barchi upon their return. In recent years the neighborhood has been seen by many Hazaras as an area for economic opportunity. The rapid population growth created job opportunities and new schools, and due to the heavily Hazara population, there were fewer concerns about discrimination hampering one's economic prospects.

While discrimination and lack of opportunity in rural enclaves had long meant that Hazaras had lower rates of education and political participation than other ethnic groups, new residents of Dasht-e Barchi sought out education and became more involved in politics. The neighborhood came to be known for political organizing and demonstrations. Hazaras in Kabul had higher rates of university enrollment and government participation than other ethnic groups. After more than a decade of relative safety, Dasht-e Barchi began to experience a rash of attacks starting in 2016.

== Geography ==
Lying at the western edge of Kabul, Dashte Barchi wraps around the mountains framing the city. Its main paved street, named for the Hazara mujahideen commander Abdul Ali Mazari, runs throughout the length of the neighborhood.

Dashte Barchi is connected to Hazarjat, the historic homeland of Hazaras, by the Kabul-Behsud Highway. However, many have avoided this highway during the US war in Afghanistan due to lawlessness.

== Incidents of terrorism ==
- On August 15, 2016, a suicide attack took place in this neighborhood, targeting an educational center called "The Promised Mehdi". The bomber struck shortly after noon in front of a crowd of 5,000, mostly students of the Hazara ethnic group who were preparing for university. 34 students were killed and 56 injured in the attack.
- On March 6, 2020, a mourning ceremony in honor of Abdul Ali Mazari was attacked by ISKP gunmen, leaving 32 dead and more than 50 injured.
- On May 12, 2020, a suicide attack targeting the maternity ward of Dashte Barchi Hospital left 16 mothers and 8 children dead. No group took responsibility for the attack.
- On October 25, 2020, the Kawsare Danish Center was targeted by a suicide bomber. At least 30 were killed and 70 more were injured in the attack. Most of the victims were students between the age of 15 and 26. ISKP claimed responsibility for the attack, but did not provide evidence.
- On May 8, 2021, the Kabul school bombing targeted Sayed al-Shuhada school for girls. No group took responsibility for the attack.
- On June 12, 2021, seven civilians were killed and six wounded in two separate explosions in Dashte Barchi. The dead included two young women.
- On September 30, 2022, the Kaaj Education Center was targeted by suicide bombers. 25 students, mostly young Hazara women sitting for a practice exam, were killed. The suspects were later killed.
