= Pakistan Institute for Peace Studies =

NGO dedicated to promote peace

Pakistan Institute of Peace Studies
- Formation: 2006
- Type: Non-governmental organization
- Headquarters: Islamabad, Pakistan
- Website: https://www.pakpips.com/

The Pakistan Institute of Peace Studies (PIPS) is a non-governmental organisation based in Islamabad, Pakistan, dedicated to promoting peace and tolerance in the country. The organization was founded in 2006 and engages in various research and advocacy activities related to peacebuilding, conflict resolution, and counter-extremism.

== History ==
PIPS conducts research on a range of issues related to peace and security in Pakistan, including terrorism, sectarian violence, and extremism. It also provides analysis and policy recommendations to government institutions, civil society organisations, and international partners. In addition to its research and advocacy work, PIPS also engages in capacity-building activities, including training programs for law enforcement officials, journalists, and civil society activists.

One of PIPS' flagship initiatives is the Pakistan Security Report, an annual publication that provides a comprehensive overview of security trends and challenges in Pakistan. The report analyzes incidents of violence, terrorism, and extremism in the country, and offers recommendations for policymakers and stakeholders.
