= Timeline of the Iraqi insurgency (2021) =

This is a timeline of events during the Islamic State insurgency in Iraq (2017–present) in 2021.

== Chronology ==
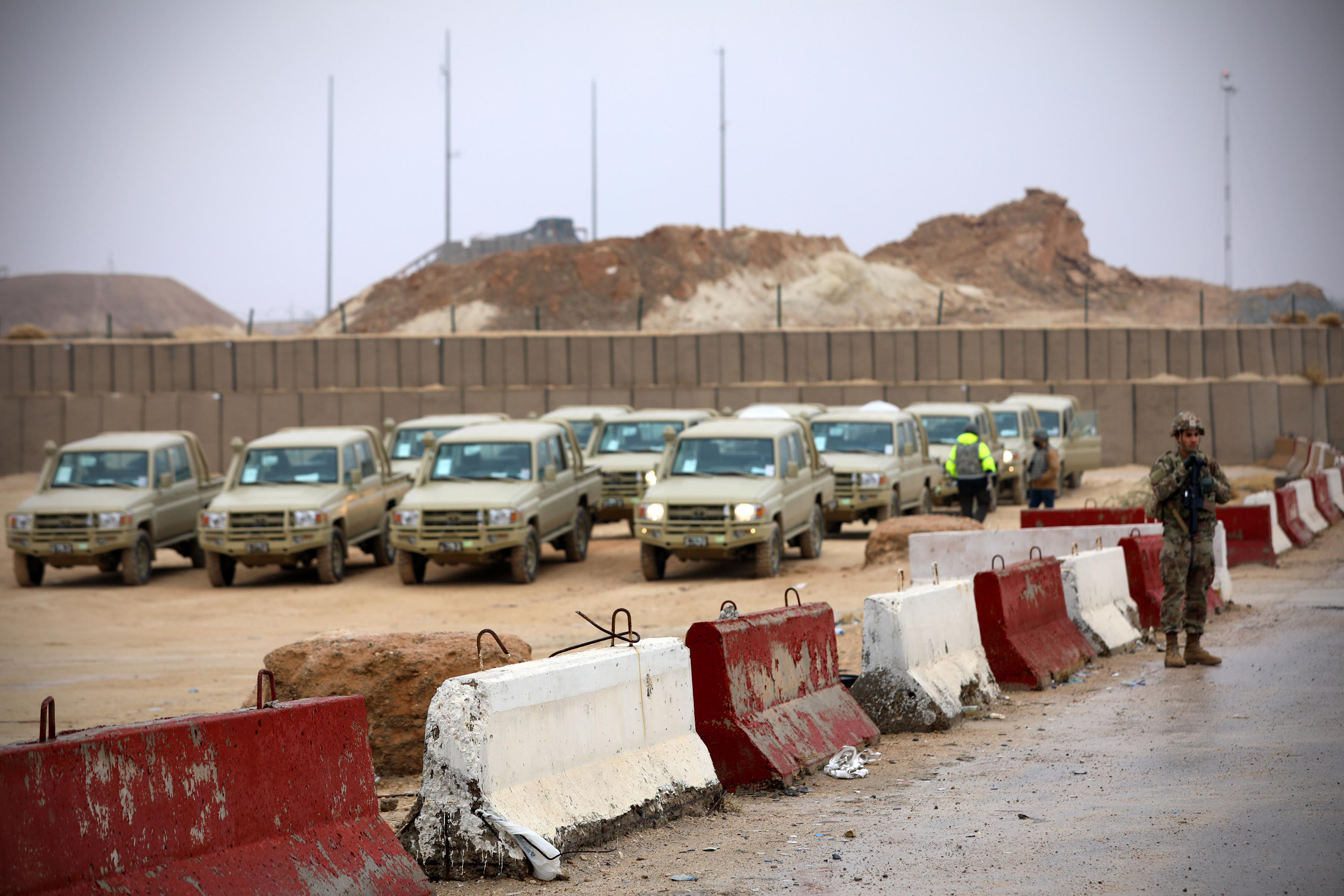
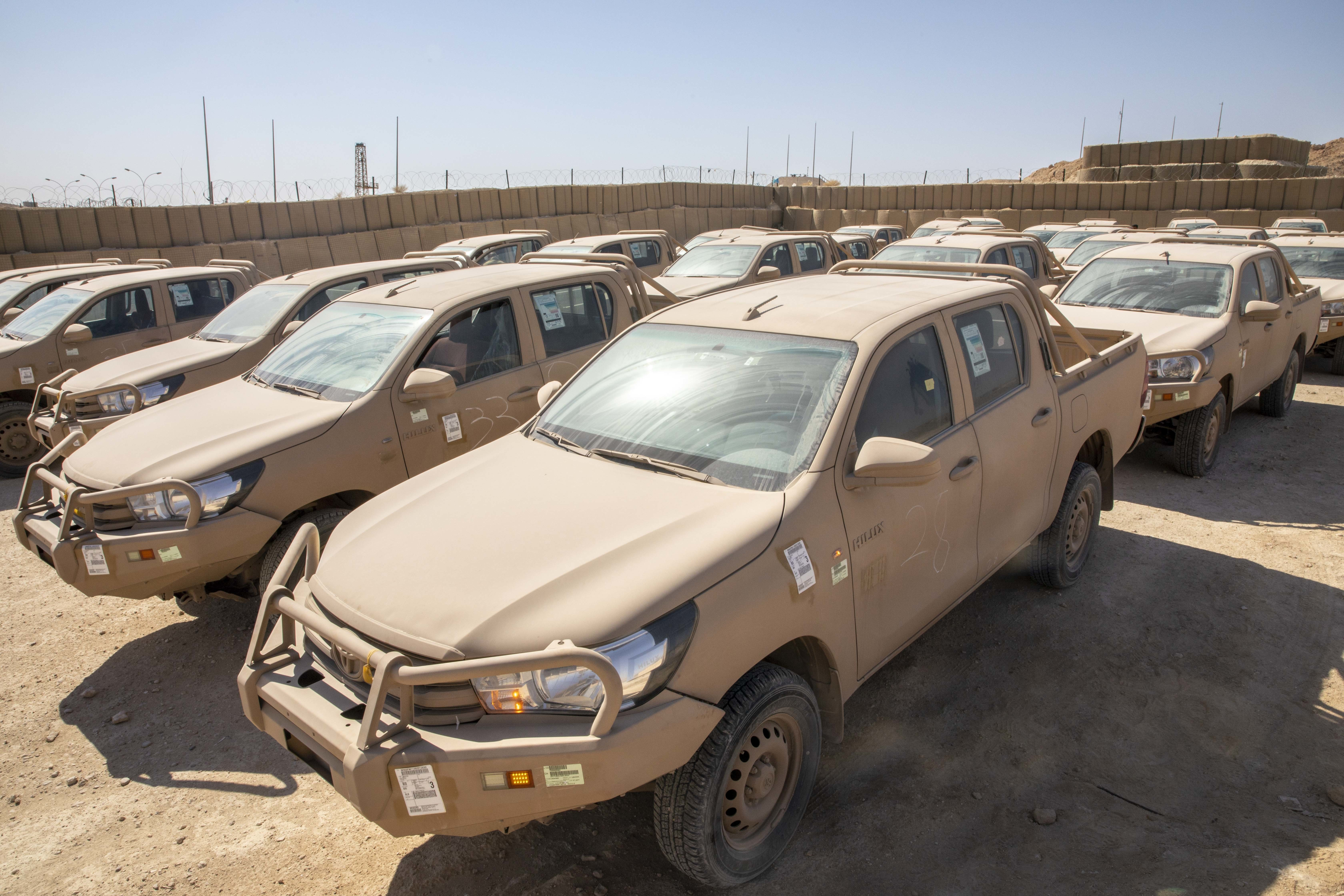
Top: On 6 February 2021, the coalition's CTEF (Counter-ISIS Train and Equip Fund) program delivered 15 land cruisers and 36 M249 Squad Automatic Weapons to Iraqi security forces at Al Asad Airbase.
Bottom: In early July 2021, the coalition delivered 35 trucks and 15 backhoe loaders to Iraq's Interior ministry.

=== January ===
- January 17, 2021 - An IED was activated against an Iraqi army vehicle in a village north of Tal Afar, about 60 km west of Mosul. Lieutenant Colonel Haidar Adel Mohammad, an Iraqi army foj commander, was killed. In addition, eight soldiers were killed, as well as the mukhtar of one of the nearby villages. According to ISIS, he was an Iraqi army collaborator.
- January 21, 2021 - The 2021 Baghdad bombings took place, killing at least 34 people (including the two attackers) and injuring 110 of those 36 are being treated in hospitals. ISIS is suspected of carrying out the attack. This was the first major deadly terrorist attack in the city since January 2018.
- January 22, 2021 - ISIS targeted an Iraqi army compound with machine gun fire about 70 km south of Kirkuk. Two soldiers were killed.
- January 23, 2021 - At least 11 fighters from the Popular Mobilization Forces (PMU) militias, were killed in an ambush by ISIS in Saladin Province.
- January 24, 2021 - Iraq's president, Barham Salih, ratified 340 death sentences of arrested ISIS militants and affiliates.
- January 27, 2021 - 11 ISIS fighters including three leaders, one of them Abu Yasser al-Issawi, were killed in a counter-terrorism operation in Al-Chai Valley, southern Kirkuk.
- January 29, 2021 - an Iraqi policeman was targeted by machine gun fire on the Kirkuk-Tikrit road. He was killed. An Iraqi police assistance force arriving at the scene was targeted by RPG rockets and machine gun fire. Several policemen were killed or wounded. Six vehicles were put out of commission.
- January 30, 2021 - an Iraqi army force killed Muthanna Shataran al-Marawi, ISIS's military commander in charge of the Al-Rutba region, in western Iraq.

=== February ===
- February 1, 2021 - British Royal Air Force carry out airstrikes against ISIS sleeper cells. An IED was activated against an Iraqi police vehicle near a village about 70 km southwest of Kirkuk. Two policemen were killed.
- February 2, 2021 - 5 members of the PMF were killed by IS militants in a clash in Diyala province. ISIS operatives fired machine guns and RPG rockets at an Iraqi army position west of Tuz Khormato, about 100 km northeast of Samarra. Two soldiers were killed and another was wounded. In addition, ISIS operatives fired machine guns at a Popular Mobilization camp in the Karmah region, about 20 km northeast of Fallujah. A Popular Mobilization fighter was killed and another was wounded.
- February 4, 2021 - ISIS operatives attacked an Iraqi army force west of Khanaqin. One soldier was killed and two others were wounded.
- February 5, 2021 - At least one soldier was killed and two wounded in an ISIS attack that targeted Iraqi security forces in northern Kirkuk province. In addition, ISIS operatives fired at an Iraqi police camp about 30 km south of Kirkuk. One policeman was killed and three others were wounded.
- February 6, 2021 - ISIS operatives fired machine guns at an Iraqi army force that tried to ambush them about 20 km south of Fallujah. One soldier was killed and two others were wounded.
- February 10, 2021 - Islamic State (IS) militants attacked the Iraqi Army forces in the eastern province of Diyala, killing at least one soldier.
- February 11, 2021 - an Iraqi police compound was targeted by machine guns south of Daquq, in southern Kirkuk. Four policemen were killed and three others were wounded.
- February 13, 2021 - an Iraqi soldier was targeted by machine gun fire north of Jalula, about 75 km northeast of Baqubah. The soldier was killed. A thermal camera was destroyed.
- February 15, 2021 - an IED was activated against an Iraqi army force in the southern Daquq area, about 70 km south of Kirkuk. One soldier was killed and several others were wounded. The Iraqi Air Force also attacked ISIS targets in the province of Diyala. At least five ISIS operatives were reportedly killed.
- February 17, 2021 - an Iraqi army compound west of Tuz Khormato, about 100 km northeast of Samarra, was targeted by machine gun fire and RPG rockets. Two soldiers were killed.
- February 18, 2021 - the Popular Mobilization Forces announced that three of its members were killed and 5 were wounded in an attack by the Islamic State (ISIS) in the outskirts of Khanaqin district in Diyala.
- February 20, 2021 - the government-backed Popular Mobilization Forces killed two ISIS leaders in an operation in the Tarmiyah area around 30 kilometers north of Baghdad, afterwards clashes erupted between the two sides in the same area, leaving three Popular Mobilization Forces members killed and two others wounded while three ISIS members were killed. On the same day a roadside bomb planted by ISIS members exploded near a Popular Mobilization Forces vehicle in Jurf al-Sakhar around 50 kilometers south of Baghdad, killing a paramilitary member and wounding two others.
- February 28, 2021 - Eight Iraqi soldiers and Tribal Mobilization fighters were killed and at least 7 more wounded after ISIS militants set off a car bomb in tha Haditha area of Anbar province, close to the Syria-Iraqi border. On the same day, a PMF vehicle was targeted with gunfire in the Kanaan area. Three PMF fighters were killed and the vehicle was destroyed. Two Iraqi soldiers were also targeted by gunfire in the Tarmiyah area, killing one soldier and wounding the other.
- February 29, 2021 - A soldier and four tribal fighters were killed and four others were injured in a bombing as they were carrying out a search operation in al-Madham, 80 kilometers west of Haditha.

=== March ===
- March 3, 2021 - An IED exploded, targeting Iraqi soldiers in the Hamrin area. The blast killed one soldier. An Iraqi army camp was also targeted in the Mashahida area, resulting in the death of 1 soldier.
- March 5, 2021 - 5 Iraqi policemen were killed and another 5 were wounded after IS attacked police checkpoints in the Mutaybijah area.
- March 8, 2021 - 1 Iraqi army captain was killed in a gunfight in northern Baghdad and another civilian was killed and 8 injured in a separate attack as a person threw a grenade at them in Baghdad. On the same day, 8 ISIS militants were arrested in three provinces.
- March 9, 2021 - Airstrikes destroyed a site containing 10 ISIS militants in Nineveh province in northern Iraq. Iraqi security forces also killed two ISIS militants.
- March 10, 2021 - British RAF jets conducted airstrikes on IS held caves west of Erbil, northern Iraq. Two caves were successfully destroyed.
- March 11, 2021 - One Iraqi soldier was killed after he was targeted by machine gun fire in the outskirts of Miqdadiya.
- March 11, 2021 - Two Iraqi soldiers were killed after an army outpost was attacked south of Daquq.
- March 12, 2021 - IS militants dressed in military uniforms massacred 7 members of the same family in the village of Albu Daur, south of Tikrit in Salah ad-Din province.
- March 13, 2021 - One Iraqi policeman was killed and another was wounded after an armed attack on a police post in the Riyad area, southwest of Kirkuk. On the same day, Iraqi army personnel attacked IS militants travelling over the Syrian-Iraqi border. The militants eventually fled to Syria after an exchange of fire that left one Iraqi soldier dead.
- March 14, 2021 - IS militants killed a Tribal PMF member and his daughter after they stormed their house in Tarimiya district, north of Baghdad.
- March 15, 2021 - One Iraqi soldier was killed and another was wounded after IS militants activated an IED targeting an Iraqi army foot patrol in the Al-Ghaith area.
- March 18, 2021 - ISIS ambushed a PMF convoy near the Samarra area. Six PMF fighters were killed in the exchange of fire. Another PMF fighter was also killed and two policemen were wounded by gunfire in a separate incident in the Rashad area, near Kirkuk.
- March 20, 2021 - Two Shi’ite civilians were abducted and executed by ISIS fighters in the Abarah area.
- March 22, 2021 - The coalition announces that it has conducted 133 airstrikes against ISIL over the past ten days in Iraq destroying 61 hideouts, 24 caves and killing dozens of ISIL militants with Iraqi forces leading the ground effort.
- March 24, 2021 - An Iraqi army camp was attacked by IS militants west of Tuz Khormato. The attack left 1 Iraqi soldier dead and 2 more wounded.
- March 26, 2021 - The Iraqi government announced that fortifications, including thermal cameras and control towers, have been installed along the Iraqi-Syrian border to prevent the infiltration of ISIS from neighboring Syria which comes as ISIS militants have stepped up their attacks in 2021.
- On the same day ISIL forces detonated an IED targeting PMF forces in the Saadiya region, leaving one PMF fighter dead and three others wounded.
- March 29, 2021 - the PMF announced that the commander of the 314th PMF Brigade and a member of the 315th PMF Brigade were both killed after clashing with militants in an anti-ISIL operation in the Samarra area.

=== April ===
- April 1, 2021 - The coalition destroyed a cave killing an ISIS militant in Therthar valley between Saladin and Anbar Governorate, meanwhile, Iraqi forces found 60 IEDs belonged to ISIS in Kirkuk Governorate.
- April 5, 2021 - An Iraqi policeman was killed after an IS attack on a police outpost in the Riyad region, near Kirkuk.
- April 7, 2021 - Iraq announces that it has killed 34 ISIS militants and arrested 99 during a 3-month long operation against the terrorist group around the country. 60 ISIS militants were also killed in a 10-day long operation near the town of Makhmur in northern Iraq.
- April 10, 2021 - An Iraqi policeman was killed in Daquq after ISIL militants targeted a police outpost.
- April 11, 2021 - a Tribal Mobilization outpost was targeted by ISIL gunfire in southern Daquq, in the southern part of Kirkuk. One fighter was killed and another was wounded.
- April 12, 2021 - Three Iraqi soldiers were killed and 2 more were wounded after an IED exploded in the Kara Tapa area. An Iraqi intelligence operative was also assassinated near Tarmiyah.
- April 13, 2021 - Three Iraqi policemen were killed and another wounded after ISIL operatives attacked their camp in the Daquq area.
- April 14, 2021 - A Turkish soldier was killed after rockets were fired at a Turkish military base in Iraq's north Bashiqa region.
- April 15, 2021 - Two joint Iraqi-PMF camps were attacked by ISIS operatives in the Tuz Khormato region, leaving three soldiers dead.
- April 16, 2021 - Four Iraqi soldiers were killed after IS militants attacked three joint Iraqi-PMF army camps near the Al-Haliwa airport, south of Kirkuk. An Iraqi army camp was also attacked near Al-Kayf, killing two Iraqi soldiers. Furthermore, an Iraqi police camp was also targeted by gunfire in the Riyad region, killing two policemen.
- April 19, 2021 - Two army camps south of the Al-Azim area, were targeted by IS gunfire. Two Iraqi soldiers were killed and an officer and a soldier were wounded. IS militants also destroyed 40 generators and transformers used by Tribal Mobilisation forces.
- April 20, 2021 - Houses of Shiite residents were targeted by gunfire about 90 km northeast of Baqubah. One resident was killed, and four houses and two cars were set on fire. An Iraqi army patrol arriving on the scene to provide assistance was targeted by an IED and gunfire. Three soldiers were killed and two officers and another soldier were wounded. ISIL later posted images of the events on their telegram.
- April 22, 2021 - An IED was activated against an Iraqi army vehicle in the Al-Waqf region, northwest of Baqubah. One soldier was killed and three others were wounded. An Iraqi police patrol that arrived on the scene was targeted by gunfire and also hit by an IED. Six policemen, including an officer, were killed, and two others were wounded. Two Iraqi policemen were also killed after militants attacked an Iraq police camp Al-Sous, south of Kirkuk.
- April 24, 2021 - Two Iraqi police officers and a civilian were killed in an ISIL double bombing in the province of Diyala. A civilian was also shot dead in Diyala later in the day, after militants fired at Iraqi security personnel.
- April 25, 2021 - Suspected IS militants raided Qayee village in the Khanaqin district, killing the village chief and wounding two others. On the same day, an IED was activated against a Tribal Mobilization vehicle near Baqubah. One fighter was killed and three others were wounded.
- April 26, 2021 - An IED exploded in the village of Jizani, targeting a Rapid Response unit deployed from Baghdad to sweep the area. The attack killed an intelligence officer and injured six members of the unit, including the commanding officer. On the same day an IED killed a PMF fighter in the Hammam al-Alil subdistrict of Ninewa province.
- April 27, 2021 - Four Iraqi policemen were killed while attempting to defuse a bomb planted by ISIL militants in Al-Rashad district in Kirkuk province.
- April 29, 2021 - An IED explosion killed a brigadier general in Iraq's Border Guard and his driver while they were travelling on a highway in Anbar province. On the same day, sniper fire a killed a PMF fighter in the Yathrib subdistrict south of Samarra in Salah ad-Din province.
- April 30, 2021 - An IED attack by ISIS killed 4 Iraqi soldiers in the Tarmiya area of north Baghdad. An Iraqi policeman was also killed during an ISIS attack in Daquq, Kirkuk

=== May ===
- May 1, 2021 - 3 Peshmerga fighters, including a captain, were killed after ISIL militants attacked Peshmerga positions close to the village of Qaya Bashi, Kirkuk. An Iraqi Brigadier General and another officer were killed by an ISIS IED blast in Akashat, west of Anbar province.
- May 5, 2021 - ISIL militants destroyed two oil wells and killed an Iraqi policeman at the Bay Hassan oil field in Kirkuk province.
- May 9, 2021 - the Popular Mobilization Forces (PMF) said that ISIL militants attacked its checkpoints in al-Jalisiya area near Samara in Salah ad-Din province. The attack killed two PMF fighters and injured another two.
- May 11, 2021 - British RAF Typhoons targeted a group of ISIS fighters southwest of Mosul. Several IS militants were killed in the airstrikes. ISIL attacked a checkpoint in Kifri district in Diyala province, killing a Peshmerga fighter.
- May 14, 2021 - an ISIL attack with two IEDs damaged power transfer towers in Riyadh subdistrict, west of Kirkuk province.
- May 16, 2021 - another ISIL attack heavily damaged two towers of the Mirsad-Diyala power transfer line in the Khanaqin district of Diyala province.
- May 17, 2021 - Iraqi forces came under fire from ISIL militants near the city of Mosul and a pair of Eurofighter Typhoons from the international coalition attacked the terrorists, killing a number of ISIL militants.
- May 19, 2021 - ISIL attacked checkpoint of tribal fighters in the Buhruz subdistrict of Diyala province. One tribal fighter was killed in the attack.
- May 22, 2021 - ISIS militants killed Majid al-Obeidi, a tribal leader in Salah ad-Din province, after they raided his house. One ISIL militant was also killed in the raid.
- May 23, 2021 - 4 ISIL militants were killed in an airdrop operation by Iraqi forces in eastern Iraq.
- May 28, 2021 - ISIL released a video of them executing at least 8 Iraqi 'collaborators' in a series of assassination videos and two beheading videos.
- May 29, 2021 - A PMF fighter was killed by ISIS sniper fire whilst repelling an infiltration attempt by ISIS in Diyala.

=== June ===
- June 1, 2021 - Kurdish Forces along with French special forces targeted an ISIL hideout near the city of Kifri at night, killing 8 militants.
- June 3, 2021 - An explosion at a crowded restaurant within a highly protected Shia shrine area of al-Kadhimiya neighborhood in northern Baghdad killed four people and injured 36 others. The Iraqi government claimed it was a propane tank that blew up however on June 4, ISIS claimed responsibility, saying it was an IED that exploded. The Iraqi government arrested 7 individuals in relation to the explosion.
- June 4, 2021 - The Iraqi Interior Ministry announces the detention of 964 wanted terrorists during a series of campaigns carried out from May 20 to 3 June.
- June 7, 2021 - One PMF fighter was killed and another was wounded during clashes with an ISIS cell, northeast of Baquba, Diyala province.
- June 8, 2021 - An ISIS member was killed by Iraqi forces near Khanaqin in Diyala.
- June 9, 2021 - Iraqi forces found the bodies of 11 Yazidis that were killed in Sinjar by ISIL in 2014. 18 terror suspects were also arrested by Iraqi forces in Nineveh Also, A man was killed and his son was wounded in an attack carried out by ISIS on a village west of Kirkuk.
- June 12, 2021 - ISIS militants attacked a Federal Police checkpoint in the Riyadh subdistrict in western Kirkuk province, killing a police captain and injured a policeman.
- June 13, 2021 - A mass grave was opened in Nineveh Governorate, which contained the remains of 123 victims of ISIL, all of whom were inmates of the Badoush prison complex.
- June 14, 2021 - The Iraqi Counter-Terrorism Service that its commando forces have killed 13 ISIL militants around the country in June so far.
- June 15, 2021 - 3 Iraqi army soldiers were killed by an IED explosion in the village of Muradiyat al-Zahawi, southwest of Baquba, in Diyala Province.
- June 16, 2021 - An Iraqi policeman was killed by ISIL sniper fire near the village of Abdul Hamid on the outskirts of Al-Abbara district, northeast of Baquba.
- June 19, 2021 - Iraqi forces arrests 10 ISIL militants in the Kirkuk province.
- 20 June 2021 - 3 civilians were killed by an ISIS sniper attack in Albu Bakr in Al-Azim, north of Baquba.
- 21 June 2021 – An ISIS militant was killed during an ambush in Diyala. On the same day an ISIS Shariah judge was sentenced to death by hanging.
- 22 June 2021 - Iraqi security forces discovered the bodies of a farmer and his son in Diyala, two hours after they were kidnapped by ISIS operatives.
- 24 June 2021 - 5 Iraqi police officers were killed after ISIS attacked their checkpoint in the village of Shabija Saud, west of Daquq district, south of Kirkuk.
- 25 June 2021 - The Iraqi judiciary sentenced 13 ISIS convicts to death.
- 26 June 2021 - 2 Iraqi police officers were killed and another was wounded after ISIS attacked their positions in the village of Abu Khanajer, west of Kirkuk.
- 29 June 2021 - An ISIS militant was killed by PMU forces while he was trying to blow up an electric power transmission tower northeast of Baquba.

=== July ===
- July 3, 2021 - 4 civilians were killed and 3 were wounded after ISIS attacked a group of fishermen in the Al-Zarka area in Haditha district, west of Anbar.
- July 5, 2021 - ISIS ambushed a group of armed civilians on the outskirts of Saif Saad, south of Qara Tabeh district, north of Jalawla. 5 of the armed civilians were killed and 2 others were wounded in the ambush.
- July 8, 2021 - One Iraqi policeman was killed and two others were wounded after ISIS launched an attack on their police checkpoint in the village of Maryam Bek, south of Kirkuk.
- July 9, 2021 - An ISIS militant was killed by Iraqi security forces after they chased him near the village of Lsan in Al-Rashad district, south of Kirkuk.
- July 13, 2021 - An Iraqi policeman was killed after ISIS operatives attacked the police's 18th Brigade near the village of Tal Khadija. On the same day, 2 Iraqi policemen were killed after unidentified gunmen targeted them in Tal Al-Taseh in Tarmiyah.
- July 14, 2021 - A farmer was abducted and executed by ISIS militants after they attacked the village of Shayala Al-Abli, in Al-Qarraj district, southeast of Mosul.
- July 15, 2021 - 2 ISIS militants were killed and another was injured after Iraqi police launched an anti-terror operation in the Al-Rashad sector in the Karha Valley Ghazan in Kirkuk. A civilian was killed by ISIS after they drove though an IS checkpoint in the Qara Bek area of Kirkuk's Dibis district.
- July 17, 2021 - 4 Iraqi soldiers were killed after ISIS operatives attacked an Iraqi army post in the village of Idris Arab, in Dibis district. On the same day, PMF forces conducted an anti-terror operation in the Shamiya area near Haditha in Anbar, killing 7 ISIS members.
- July 17, 2021 - ISIS attacked a quarry in the Hit district of Anbar province, killing two factory employees and injuring three others. On the same day, PMF forces seized an IS camp in the western desert of Anbar, killing one ISIS operative.
- July 19, 2021 - A suicide bombing took place in Baghdad, killing at least 30 people and wounding dozens more. ISIS claimed responsibility for the attack via telegram.
- July 21, 2021 - 2 Iraqi soldiers were killed after ISIS militants attacked an army headquarters in the Mutaibija sector, east of Salah al-Din Governorate.
- July 22, 2021 - 2 Iraqi army soldiers and a tribal fighter were killed after ISIS operatives attacked a military checkpoint west of Al-Rutba district in Anbar Governorate.
- July 23, 2021 - 3 Iraqi police were killed and another was wounded after ISIS elements attacked the village of (Garha Kazan) south of Kirkuk towards Tikrit
- July 26, 2021 - 2 civilians were killed by ISIS during an attack on the village of Mukhaisah, on the outskirts of Abi Saida district, northeast of Baquba.
- July 27, 2021 - A civilian was killed in an ISIS attack on a security point northeast of Baquba, Diyala Governorate.
- July 30, 2021 - 4 civilians were killed and 16 were wounded after ISIS attacked a funeral hall in Yathrib district, south of Salah al-Din. On the same day two civilians were killed by ISIL militants in the Tarmiyah district north of Baghdad. ISIL operatives also attacked an ISF checkpoint Halwan area of Diyala province, killing 4 civilians.
- July 31, 2021 - One PMF fighter was killed after an IED exploded under a PMF vehicle in the al-Zarga subdistrict in Salah ad-Din province.

=== August ===
- August 1 - a civilian was killed after a roadside bomb was detonated in the Baaj district of Ninewa province.
- August 2 - 1 Iraqi federal policeman was killed and 3 others were wounded after ISIS attacked the village of Al-Asfar, south of Kirkuk. On the same day, 'unidentified' operatives shot dead the commander of the PMF's 9th brigade, Abu Sadiq al-Khashkhashi along with one of his bodyguards, in Babylon province. 2 civilians were also killed in an attack in the al-Dhuloiyah district of Salah ad-Din.
- August 5 - Iraqi Federal police arrested an ISIL member in the city of Mosul.
- August 6 - ISIS militants attacked an Iraqi military outpost south of Daquq in Kirkuk province, killing one Iraqi soldier.
- August 7 - ISIL snipers attacked al-Nabai, north of Baghdad, killing one Iraqi soldier and wounding another.
- August 8 - An Iraqi policeman was killed northeast of Baquba in Diyala province, after ISIL snipers targeted a police checkpoint.
- August 9 - a former anti-ISIL tribal fighter was beheaded at a digging site in Kirkuk after ISIL militants stormed a nearby village and attacked the site. On the same day, Iraqi security forces killed Omar Jawad al-Mashhadani, a key transporter of ISIS suicide bombers, during an ambush in Tarmiyah district. Later in the day, a tribal fighter was killed and two more were wounded after ISIL operatives attacked a checkpoint in the village of Maizila in Makhmour district, southeast of Mosul.
- August 13 - ISIL claimed responsibility of the assassination of a mukhtar of the village of Al-Nahiya, on the outskirts of Al-Sharqat district.
- August 17 - 3 Iraqi soldiers were killed and a fourth was wounded in an ISIL attack targeting a military checkpoint in the village of Al-Ali within the northern Muqdadiyah sector, northeast of Baquba. Furthermore, two ISIL operatives were killed in an Iraqi Air Force airstrike in Kirkuk province.
- August 20 - Four soldiers of the PMF, including a commander, were killed whilst repelling an ISIL attack in the Tarmiyah orchards north of Baghdad.
- August 21 - ISIS released a hostage they kidnapped near Mosul, after their family had paid a ransom for his release.
- August 23 - An Iraqi Air Force airstrike killed 3 ISIS militants in Salah ad-Din, during a counter insurgency operation. 2 Iraqi soldiers were also injured in the operation.
- August 28 - Iraqi special forces killed a suspected ISIL suicide bomber who was preparing to attack an area south of Kirkuk.
- August 29 - An Iraqi policeman was killed and 4 police vehicles were burnt out during an ISIL attack in the village of Marata, west of Kirkuk.
- August 30 - Two ISIS militants were killed and another was arrested by Iraqi security forces in Diyala. An Iraqi border guard was also killed during an ISIS attack in the Akashat region of Anbar province. A soldier was captured during the attack and was found beheaded two days later on the Syrian border.

=== September ===
- September 1 - An Iraqi soldier was killed and 7 more were wounded after ISIS operatives attacked the village of Al-Sahel in Serklan district. The son of the village mayor was also kidnapped by ISIS in the same attack.
- September 4 - Two Iraqi policemen were killed in an ISIL attack on a federal police checkpoint near the village of Sateeh.
- September 5 - 13 Iraqi policemen were killed in an ISIS attack in the region of Al-Rashad south of Kirkuk city. On the same day, 3 Iraqi soldiers were killed and another was seriously wounded after ISIS attacked an army checkpoint in Karaj district of Makhmour district, southeast of Mosul. ISIL also attacked forces of the PMF with an IED in the Al-Owaisat area, north of Jurf Al-Nasr district, killing Hassan Karim Hassan, the assistant commander of the 'Al-Jazeera operations' and wounding two other members of the PMF.
- September 8 - 4 ISIS militants were killed in an Iraqi security operation in Kirkuk province.
- September 11 - 4 people, including a captain and soldier of the PMF were killed in an ISIS attack in the village of Khattab within Makhmour district. On the same day, 3 Iraqi policemen were killed during an ISIS attack on the village of Al-Saidi, in Daquq district, south of Kirkuk.
- September 12 - 6 ISIS militants were killed in an Iraqi airstrike in Kirkuk province. On the same day, 3 Iraqi soldiers were killed and another was wounded after ISIL operatives attacked their military checkpoint near the village of Al-Tala'a, north of Baquba. Another Iraqi soldier was also wounded in a separate attack nearby.
- September 14 - Iraqi Army Lieutenant-Colonel Zaid Jassim Al-Shammari died of wounds he sustained during an ISIS attack in Diyala two days prior.
- September 15 - An Iraqi soldier was killed and 3 others were wounded after ISIS operatives attacked a military checkpoint in Baquba. On the same day, an Iraqi soldier died of wounds he sustained in an ISIL attack the previous day near Baquba.
- September 23 - The Iraqi ministry of intelligence announced that 7 ISIS militants were killed in a security operation in the Hamrin mountain range.
- September 26 - a lieutenant colonel and a policeman were killed in an ISIS attack on their checkpoint in the outskirts of Muqdadiya.
- September 28 - An ISIS member was killed by Iraqi security forces in the Mukashifa district of Salah al-Din. On the same day, an Iraqi soldier was killed in an ISIS attack in Al-Baaj, west of Mosul.

=== October ===
- October 1 - A spokesman for the Iraqi armed forces announced the killing of 8 ISIS members during a military operation in Kirkuk governorate.
- October 3 - An Iraqi soldier was killed and 3 others, including and officer, were wounded after ISIL operatives attacked a military checkpoint on the border between Diyala and Salah al-Din.
- October 4 - An Iraqi athlete was killed after ISIL snipers targeted them as they were receiving sports equipment from a stadium on the outskirts of Muqdadiya district, Diyala.
- October 5 - ISIL's Amaq News Agency released a 50-minute video of IS operations in Iraq. The footage showed the execution of at least 22 people including 2 beheadings and several minutes of combat footage against Iraqi and allied forces.
- October 10 - A police major was killed and another policeman was injured after IS militants attacked the village of Sateeh, southwest of Kirkuk.
- October 11 - ISIL's chief financer, Sami Jasim Muhammad al-Jaburi, was arrested by Iraqi security forces in Baghdad.
- October 18 - Abu Ubaida Baghdad, the IS militant responsible for the 2016 Karrada bombing was arrested by Iraqi security forces after a complex intelligence mission outside of Iraq.
- October 19 - ISIL released footage of them executing a man who had 'abandoned Islam' and who was allegedly making a living from repairing Iraq military vehicles.
- October 21 - A civilian was killed and another was injured after ISIS militants attacked a police checkpoint near the town of Badush, northwest of Mosul.
- October 22 - The Iraqi defence ministry announced that Iraqi security forces had killed Osama al-Mulla, ISIS's deputy chief in charge of security, during a security operation in Al-Rutba, in western Iraq.
- October 26 - A soldier of the PMF was killed and 2 others were wounded in an ISIS attack on a PMF checkpoint on the outskirts of Al-Saadiya district in Diyala governorate. Later that day, 11 civilians were killed and 18 more were wounded in an ISIS attack on predominantly-Shia Al-Rashad village in Diyala province. Iraqi president Barham Salih said the attack was a “despicable attempt to destabilise the country”. 8 Sunni civilians were later killed in a revenge attack by Shia tribesmen on the Sunni village of al-Imam
- October 30 - 3 civilians were killed and 2 others were kidnapped by IS militants attacked a group of coal diggers on the banks of the Tigris River, Abbasi district, west of Kirkuk. On the same day, Iraqi forces killed an ISIS militant and wounded another near the Riyadh district, west of Kirkuk

=== November ===
- November 2 - A soldier of the PMF died of wounds he sustained a day earlier whilst repelling an ISIS attack in the Akbashi sector in the outskirts of Khanaqin, northeast of Baquba.
- November 7 - Two ISIS militants were killed and a third blew himself up during an Iraqi security operation in the western Anbar desert.
- November 9 - A PMF soldier was killed in a clash with IS cells at the Hatra district junction, south of Mosul.
- November 10 - A PMF soldier was killed in clashes with ISIS cells in Amirli, Salah al-Din. 2 civilians were also killed by ISIS gunfire during the attack.
- November 12 - One ISIS militant was killed and another was wounded by Iraqi security forces in Wadi al-Shay, south of Kirkuk.
- November 22 - An Iraqi soldier was killed and 3 others were injured after ISIS snipers targeted their military post in Ibrahim village, south of Baquba.
- November 25 - A soldier of the PMF was killed and a civilian was injured during an ISIS attack on the village of al-Raya'a, northeast of Baquba.
- November 27 - 5 Peshmerga fighters were killed and 4 others were wounded after ISIS operatives detonated a roadside bomb targeting Peshmerga fighters in the Kolju district in Garmian region of northern Iraq.

=== December ===
- December 6 - 6 ISIS militants were killed in an Iraqi airstrike on an ISIS hideout in the Anbar desert.
- December 8 - 2 ISIS militants were killed in an Iraqi air force operation in the Al-Kassar area in Anbar province.
- December 16 – 3 Iraqi soldiers were killed and 3 others were wounded during clashes with IS forces in the Hamrin Basin, northeast of Baquba. On the same day, IS claimed responsibility for abducting and beheading Iraqi army Colonel Yasser Ali al-Jourani in the Northern Hamrin area, south of Kirkuk. They later released footage of the execution.
- December 20 - Iraqi forces launched airstrikes on IS positions in the Sadiyah district of Diyala, killing 2 ISIS fighters.
- December 22 - 2 PMF fighters were killed and 4 more were wounded by IS operatives after they attacked their positions in the Al-Fatah area of the Saladin Governorate.
- December 26 - 2 ISIS militants were killed after Iraqi forces ambushed them in the Tarfawi area, west of Kirkuk.

== See also ==
- Timeline of the Islamic State (2020)
