= Timeline of the Iraqi insurgency (2019) =

This is a timeline of events during the Islamic State insurgency in Iraq (2017–present) in 2019.

== Chronology ==
=== January–July ===
- 14 January 2019 - An IS attack on a checkpoint northwest of Kirkuk resulted in the death of 1 PMU fighter.
- 9 February 2019 - 2 Iraqi bomb disposal soldiers were killed while defusing a bomb in the city of Hīt, West of Ramadi.
- 2 February 2019 - Popular Mobilization Forces killed 2 IS fighters trying to sneak into Diyala Governorate from the Hamreen mountains area.
- 17 March 2019 - Clashes between the Iraqi Army and PKK in Sinjar left 2 Iraqi soldiers dead and 5 militants wounded according to the Iraqi Military. The fighting started after PKK militia fighters were denied passage through an army checkpoint.
- 7 July 2019 - The Iraqi army launched an Operation, dubbed "Will of Victory" to clear the Salahaddin, Nineveh and Anbar provinces of IS sleeper cells. It had concluded by 11 July 2019.

=== August ===
- 10 August 2019 - A US marine was killed in the Nineveh Governorate by IS while advising Iraqi security forces.

=== September ===
- 10 September 2019 - A massive bombing of Qanus Island, on the Tigris River south of Mosul, leveled an IS transit and operations hub.
- 20 September 2019 – 2019 Karbala bombing: An unidentified man boarded a minibus in the southern Iraqi city of Karbala, disembarking a little later after having left a bag behind. It exploded shortly afterwards, killing 12 and wounding five others. The suspect was later arrested and the Islamic State claimed responsibility. The bombing was one of the worst attack against civilians since the end of the War in Iraq.

Coalition airstrike on IS positions, Qanus Island, Iraq, September 2019

=== October ===
- 21 October 2019 - IS attacked an Iraqi security checkpoint in the Allas oilfields area in northern Salahuddin province, killing 2 and wounding 3 security members.
- 30 October 2019 - Rockets were fired into the Green Zone in Baghdad near the US embassy amid mass protests against the Iraqi government, an Iraqi soldier was reportedly killed by the rocket fire.

=== December ===
- 3 December 2019 - Iraqi security forces announce the capture of Baghdadi's "deputy" who operated under the name of "Abu Khaldoun". According to security officials, a police unit in Hawija, Kirkuk Governorate, tracked down Khaldoun to an apartment in the March 1 area where he was hiding; he possessed a fake I.D. under the name of Shaalan Obeid when apprehended. Khaldoun was previously IS's "military prince" of Iraq's Saladin Governorate.
- 17 December 2019 - A coalition airstrike targeted IS locations in Makhmur District.

== See also ==
- Timeline of the Islamic State (2019)
