= Timeline of the Iraqi insurgency (2020) =

This is a timeline of events during the Islamic State insurgency in Iraq (2017–present) in 2020.

== Chronology ==
=== January–February ===
- 16 January 2020 - An Iraqi SWAT team announced the capture of IS mufti Abu Abdul Bari, also known as Shifa al-Nima, in Mosul who authorized the destruction of Prophet Jonah Mosque on 24 July 2014. Amusingly, he was taken away on the back of a truck, since he weighed 254 kilograms (560 lb).
- 19 January 2020 - Iraqi counter terrorism forces (ICTS) arrested an IS security official in Fallujah.

=== March ===
- 8 March 2020 - Two American soldiers were "killed by enemy forces while advising and accompanying Iraqi Security Forces during a mission to eliminate an IS terrorist stronghold in a mountainous area of north central Iraq", according to the U.S.-led coalition in Baghdad. One French special Operator was also wounded in the firefight, IS casualties were estimated to be 17–19 killed. The two U.S. Marine Raiders were killed in the Qara Chokh Mountains near Makhmur.

=== April ===
- April 28, 2020 - A militant wearing a suicide vest attacked the Intelligence and Counter-Terrorism Directorate in the Qadisiyah neighborhood of Kirkuk, wounding three Iraqi security personnel. Iraqi government officials blamed the Islamic State.

=== May–November ===
- May 2, 2020 - At least ten members of the PMF were killed in an attack by IS.

=== December ===
- December 14, 2020 - 42 IS fighters were killed by Iraqi forces in the Nineveh governorate

== See also ==
- Timeline of the Islamic State (2020)
