= 12 April 1993 Srebrenica shelling =

1993 Republika Srpska artillery attack

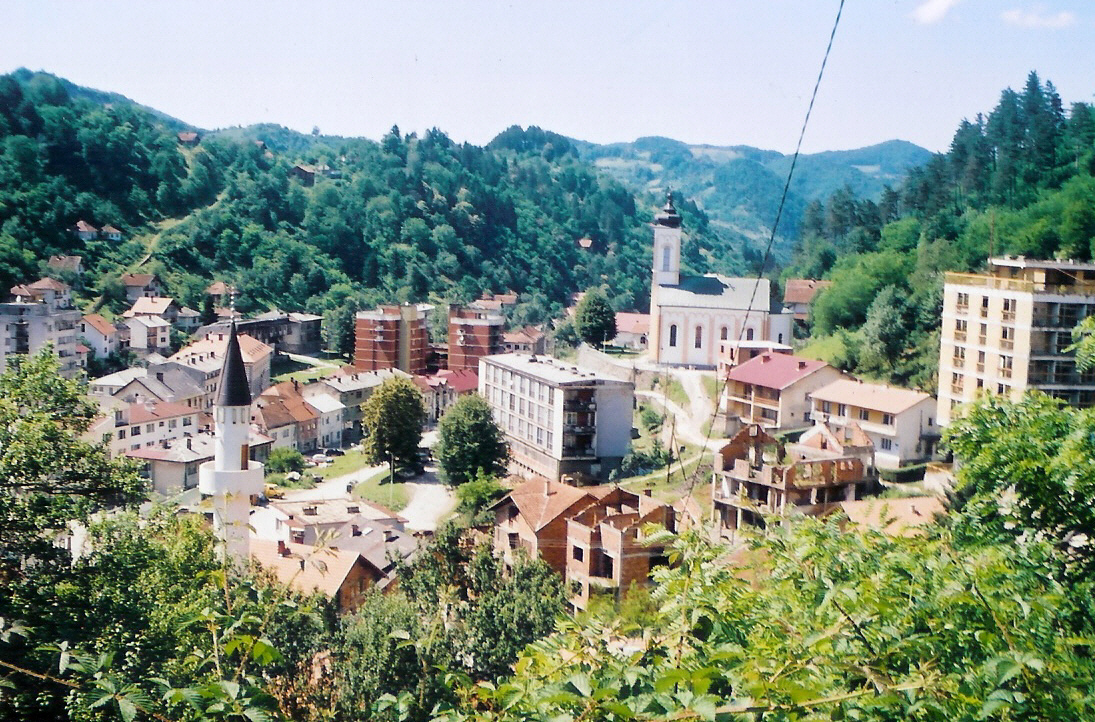
- Panorama of Srebrenica
- Location: 44°06′15″N 19°17′50″E

On 12 April 1993, the Army of Republika Srpska (VRS) launched an artillery attack against the town of Srebrenica. The attack left 56 dead (including 14 children killed on a school playground), and 73 seriously wounded. The attack followed the suspension of cease-fire talks, and only hours before NATO would implement a no-fly zone in accordance to an UN resolution. VRS officials had previously told UNHCR representatives that unless the town surrendered within two days, the VRS would shell it.

== Background ==
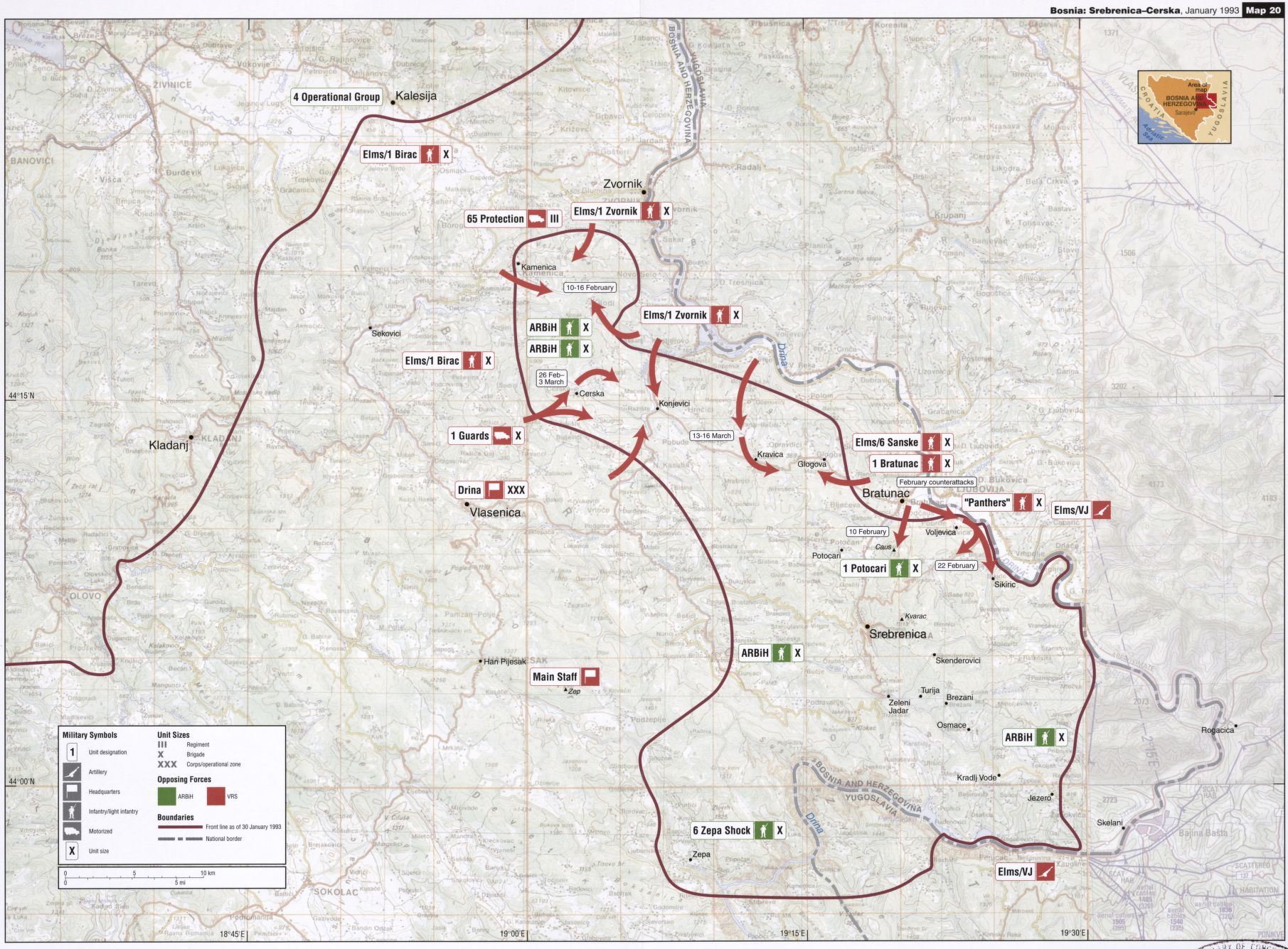
Eastern Bosnia battleground in January 1993.

Srebrenica was a Bosnian Muslim (Bosniak) enclave in a vulnerable location that was easily targeted by artillery. After VRS overran the town in April 1992, Muslim irregulars recaptured it in May. During the subsequent winter, the town was used as a starting point for Muslim guerrilla activity against Serb settlements in the eastern part of Bosnia. Muslim raids on Serb settlements enraged the VRS, inviting for revenge attacks. Bosnian Muslim forces attacked Kravica, a Serb village, in January 1993. The VRS responded with a counter-offensive, capturing Konjević Polje and Cerska, severing the Srebrenica–Žepa link and reducing the size of the Srebrenica enclave to 150 km^{2}. Thousands of Muslim refugees, cleansed from surrounding settlements, had flocked to the town, sleeping in the open. The population swelled to 50–60,000. The VRS blockaded aid convoys from entering the town. There were reports of terror inflicted by both sides in the months following January.

On 12 March, UNPROFOR commander Philippe Morillon had promised the town residents that they were under UN protection and that he would 'never abandon' them. This move angered his superiors, but made him a hero in Srebrenica. He had been held hostage by the Muslim citizens until he promised to bring security. The residents lived under siege conditions. Between March and April, 8–9,000 Bosnian Muslims were evacuated from the town by the UNHCR. The Bosnian Muslim government opposed these evacuation, characterized them as contributing to the ethnic cleansing of the territory.

At the beginning of April 1993, the Bosnian Serbs ordered through UNHCR the surrender of the Bosnian government within 48 hours. They required that the UN forces assist the VRS (headed by Ratko Mladić) by evacuating and disarming over 60,000 people in the enclave.

== Shelling ==
On 12 April 1993 a VRS artillery attack of two short bombardments on Srebrenica left 56 dead, including children, and 73 seriously wounded. Shells dropped on the densely packed streets of the town. 14 bodies of children were found in a school playground (soccer field), which had been hit by a shell at around 3 PM according to HRW. There was a total of 15 civilian casualties at the playground according to the ICTY.

The attack came after suspension of cease-fire talks, hours before NATO would implement a no-fly zone according to UNSCR 781. The VRS had earlier told UNHCR representatives that they would attack the town of Srebrenica within two days unless it surrendered. The Bosnian Serb suspension of talks and shelling of the town 'seemed a deliberate act of malice and political intent'. UN first reported that the shelling was a response to a Muslim attack, but later retracted the statement since there were no evidence for a Muslim aggression. The UNPROFOR's handling has been criticized as ineffective.

== Witness accounts ==
American journalist Chuck Sudetic interviewed Bosnian Army doctor Nedret Mujkanović who claimed 36 people dead on site and 102 seriously wounded at the playground, whom he treated. "People were sitting around in front of the school," he said. "The children were playing football and other games. In less than one minute, seven rockets from a multiple-rocket launcher fell in an area about half the size of a football field." He claimed that the VRS knew that there was a refugee camp at the school and that they directed their fire at that location.

== Aftermath and legacy ==
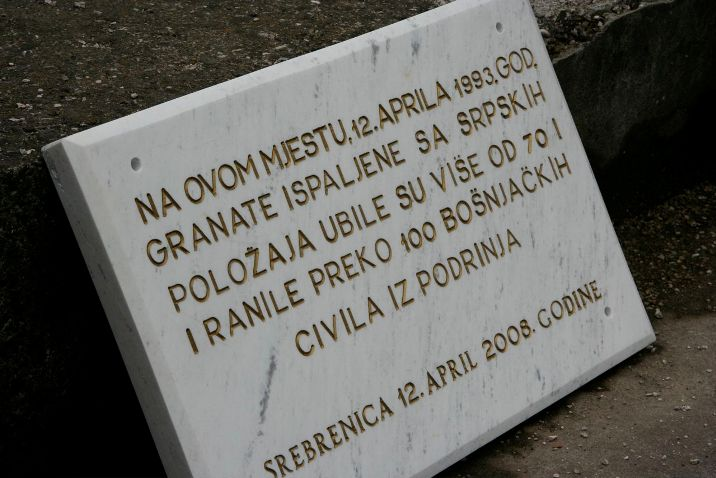
Srebrenica Children Massacre Memorial

On 16 April, the UN declared Srebrenica a safe zone, and also put the enclaves of Žepa and Goražde under UN protection.

A photograph of a blood-covered and blinded boy lying on a stretcher, Sead Bekrić, was widely broadcast and made the front cover of Newsweek. The word "Bosnia" was printed across Sead's injured chest. After seeing him on CNN, a wealthy Croatian-American couple paid for his location and evacuation.

The incident is included in the 26th point ("Shelling of civilian gatherings") in the initial indictment issued by the ICTY on 24 July 1995 against Bosnian Serb leaders Radovan Karadžić and Ratko Mladić. 15 civilian casualties at the Srebrenica playground are listed.

The incident is also mentioned in Emir Suljagić's personal account of the siege and fall of Srebrenica, Postcards from the Grave.

== See also ==
- Srebrenica massacre

== Sources ==
- Burg, Steven L.; Shoup, Paul S. (2015). Ethnic Conflict and International Intervention: Crisis in Bosnia-Herzegovina, 1990-93. Routledge. pp. 140–. ISBN 978-1-317-47102-8.
- Greenberg, Melanie C.; Barton, John H.; McGuinness, Margaret E. (2000). Words Over War: Mediation and Arbitration to Prevent Deadly Conflict. Rowman & Littlefield. pp. 51–. ISBN 978-0-8476-9892-9.
- Honig, Jan Willem; Both, Norbert (1996). Srebrenica: record of a war crime. Penguin. p. 94. ISBN 9780140261653.
- Klip, André (2005). The International Criminal Tribunal for the Former Yugoslavia 2001. Intersentia nv. pp. 602–. ISBN 978-90-5095-375-7.
- Seib, Philip M. (2002). The Global Journalist: News and Conscience in a World of Conflict. Rowman & Littlefield. pp. 60–. ISBN 978-0-7425-1102-6.
- "Case No. IT-95-5-I" (PDF). ICTY.
