= Suljagić =

Suljagić is a Bosnian surname. Notable people with the surname include:

- Emir Suljagić (born 1975), Bosnian journalist and politician
- Memnun Suljagić (born 1966), Bosnian footballer and youth coach
