= Hrnčići =

Hrnčići Хрнчићи
- Village
- Location within Bosnia and Herzegovina
- Coordinates: 44.2417°N 19.1442°E
- Country: Bosnia and Herzegovina
- Entity: Republika Srpska
- Municipality: Bratunac

Population (1991)
  - Total: 1,226
- Time zone: UTC+1 (CET)
  - Summer (DST): UTC+2 (CEST)

Hrnčići (Serbian Cyrillic: Хрнчићи) is a village in the municipality of Bratunac, Bosnia and Herzegovina.

== Notable people ==
This is the birthplace of Bosniak activist Fata Orlović, who later lived in Konjević Polje near Bratunac.

The Islamist Bajro Ikanović is also born in this village.
