= January 2021 Baghdad bombings =

Terrorist attack in Baghdad

- Part of the ISIL insurgency in Iraq
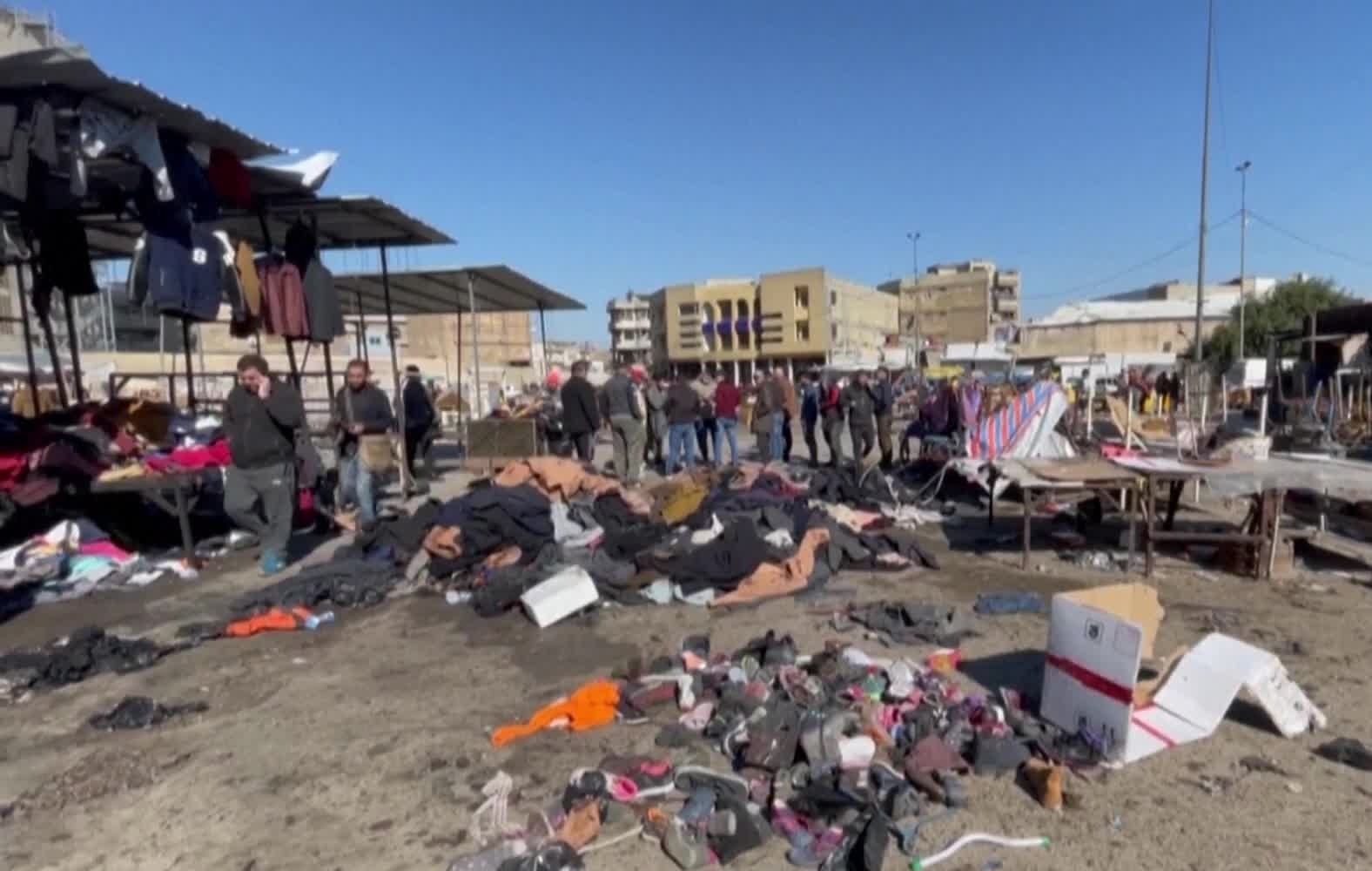
- Baghdad bombings aftermath, the Market

- The attack occurred in Baghdad, Iraq.
- Location: Baghdad, Baghdad Governorate, Iraq
- Date: 21 January 2021
- Target: Shia Muslims
- Attack type: Suicide bombing
- Weapon: Explosive belt
- Deaths: 34 (including two attackers)
- Injuries: 110
- Perpetrator: Islamic State of Iraq and the Levant
- Motive: Anti-Shi'ism

The January 2021 Baghdad bombings were a pair of terrorist attacks that occurred on 21 January 2021, carried out by two suicide bombers at an open-air market in central Baghdad, Iraq. They killed at least 32 people and injured another 110. This was the Iraqi capital’s first terrorist attack since 2019.

== Background ==
Since late 2017, the period in which the Islamic State was defeated, terrorist attacks in Iraq became rare. From 2003 to 2017, attacks were common in the entire country, with Baghdad and nearby cities being the main targets. The last major deadly attack against civilians, during the post-war period, occurred in January 2018 at the same location, leaving at least 35 people dead.

== Attack ==
In the early hours of the morning, a clothing market in Tayaran Square, central Baghdad, was crowded as people were shopping after the market recently reopened, after being closed for about a year due to the COVID-19 pandemic in Iraq. An attacker entered and yelled “My stomach is hurting!" in Arabic. As nearby people got close to him, he pressed a detonator in his hand and blew himself up, killing several people. A second suicide bomber then struck and killed 32 civilians and wounded more than 110 others. Several of these civilians were in critical condition.

== Responsibility ==
Amaq News Agency credited Islamic State of Iraq and the Levant bombers. The claim, which was released hours after the attack, stated that the organization targeted Shia Muslims. This was later backed up by an official statement from ISIL claiming responsibility for both attacks.

== Aftermath ==
The Kata'ib Hezbollah militia accused the United States, Israel and Saudi Arabia of being responsible for the attack, vowing to transfer the "battle" into Saudi Arabia.

On 22 January 2021, missile and drone strikes targeted Saudi capital Riyadh. Iraqi militia “The True Promise Brigades” claimed responsibility and said the attacks were done as revenge for the bombings done by ISIL, which they accuse Riyadh of supporting. Saudi government held the Yemeni Houthi movement responsible but the Houthis denied launching the strike. On 28 January, Abu Yasser al-Issawi, a senior ISIS commander, was killed by Iraqi Armed Forces in Al-Chai Valley, southern Kirkuk.

== International reactions ==
Bahrain, Canada, Egypt, France, Iran, Kuwait, Jordan, Lebanon, Malaysia, Tunisia, Turkey, Saudi Arabia, the United Arab Emirates, Qatar, the United States, Yemen, Palestine condemned the attacks.

The Gulf Cooperation Council condemned the attack with the Secretary-General Nayef Al-Hajraf “offering condolences and sympathy to the families of the victims and wished the injured a speedy recovery.”

== See also ==
- 26 July 2007 Baghdad market bombing
- 2021 Erbil rocket attacks
- War against the Islamic State
- List of terrorist incidents in 2021
- List of terrorist incidents in Iraq
- List of terrorist incidents linked to ISIL
- List of wars and battles involving ISIL
- Persecution of Shias by ISIL
- Timeline of Baghdad
