= Srebrenica Genocide Memorial =

Cemetery for the victims of the 1995 genocide

Srebrenica Genocide Memorial Srebrenica–Potočari Memorial and Cemetery to Genocide Victims
- Memorijalni centar Srebrenica–Potočari
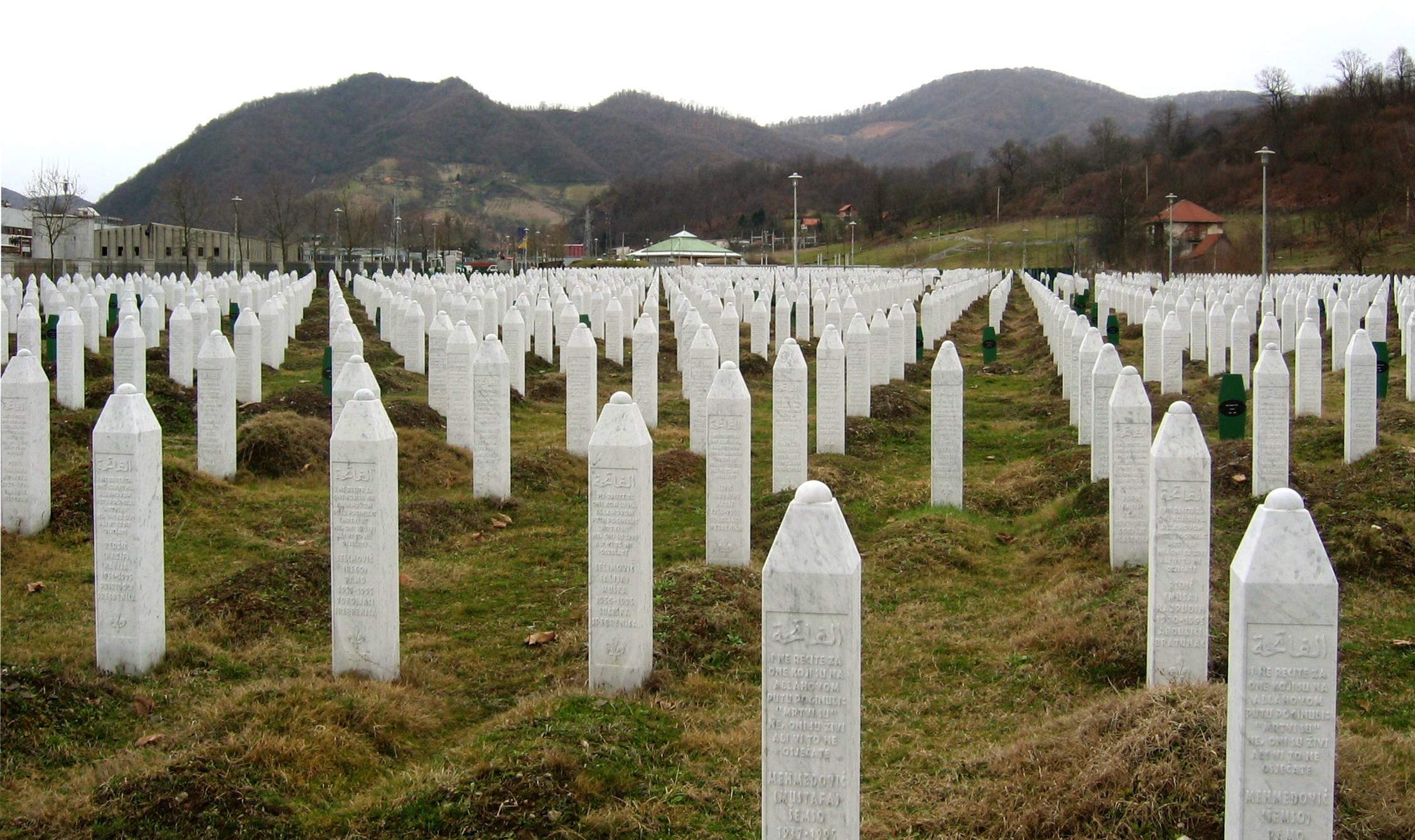
- The gravestones at the Memorial Center
- Interactive map of Srebrenica Genocide Memorial; Srebrenica–Potočari Memorial and Cemetery to Genocide Victims

Details
- Established: 20 September 2003; 22 years ago
- Country: Bosnia and Herzegovina
- Coordinates: 44°9′29″N 19°18′6″E
- Type: public, memorial
- Size: central area and graves: ~ 5 hectares (12 acres); total: > 10 ha (25 acres)
- No. of graves: 6,504 (of 8,372 carved names)
- Website: https://srebrenicamemorial.org
- Founded after Srebrenica massacre

The Srebrenica Genocide Memorial, officially known as the Srebrenica–Potočari Memorial and Cemetery for the Victims of the 1995 Genocide, is the memorial-cemetery complex in Srebrenica set up to honour the victims of the 1995 Srebrenica massacre. The victims—at least 8,372 of them—were male Muslim Bosniaks.

As of May 2017, 6,938 genocide victims had been identified through DNA analysis (conducted by the International Commission on Missing Persons) of human remains recovered from mass graves as of July 2021, 6,671 Bosnian Muslim victims had been buried at the memorial cemetery, while another 236 had been buried elsewhere.

== Background ==
The massacre in Srebrenica began in Potočari, where some 25,000 Bosniak Muslim refugees had desperately gathered awaiting evacuation. After entering the city on 11 July 1995, Bosnian Serb forces, led by Ratko Mladić, moved into Potočari and separated many Bosnian men and teenage boys from the rest of the crowd before killing them; some women and girls were raped and killed as well. The Dutch UN peacekeepers stationed in Srebrenica (Dutchbat) were unable to stop the massacre, despite having their headquarters in the town. In all, about 1,200 innocent people were murdered at Potočari before the survivors were evacuated to Tuzla.

In October 2000 Wolfgang Petritsch, the High Representative for Bosnia and Herzegovina, declared that the land in Potočari would be turned into a memorial and cemetery for the victims of the genocide. In May 2001, a foundation was established to oversee and finance construction of the Srebrenica Genocide Memorial. Two months later, around the time of the sixth anniversary of the massacre, a foundation stone was laid for the memorial in front of a crowd of 15,000 people. The first memorial was held in July 2002 with about 20,000 attendees. The first 600 victims were buried in the new cemetery in March 2003.

The current director of the memorial is Emir Suljagić.

== Opening ==
The $5.8 million memorial-cemetery complex was paid for with donations from private groups and governments. The United States provided $1 million toward the project. The memorial was opened by the former United States President, Bill Clinton, on 20 September 2003, when he told thousands of relatives of the Srebrenica massacre victims:

Bad people who lusted for power killed these good people simply because of who they were. But Srebrenica was the beginning of the end of genocide in Europe. [...] We remember this terrible crime because we dare not forget, because we must pay tribute to the innocent lives, many of them children, snuffed out in what must be called genocidal madness. [...] I hope the very mention of the name "Srebrenica" will remind every child in the world that pride in our own religious and ethnic heritage does not require or permit us to dehumanize or kill those who are different. I hope and pray that Srebrenica will be for all the world a sober reminder of our common humanity. [...] May God bless the men and boys of Srebrenica and this sacred land their remains grace.

Clinton was the President of the United States during much of the Bosnian war and presided over the Dayton peace agreement.

== Layout ==
The memorial centre consists of a cemetery west of road R453 linking Bratunac and Srebrenica, and an exhibition centre and offices in the ancient battery factory, which served as the headquarters of the Dutch UNPROFOR battalion during the siege of Srebrenica, east of the road.

Apart from the vast field of graves, the cemetery hosts an open-air mosque, a list of names of the victims engraved in a semi-circular stone installation, and a small exhibition hall for temporary exhibitions.

On the area of the ancient battery factory and Dutchbat headquarters, partly ruined industrial buildings host exhibitions commemorating the siege of Srebrenica, the Srebrenica genocide, and the consequences for the lives of survivors. The lives of some of the victims are illustrated, and the development of the genocide is explained in text, videos, and maps. Another exhibition in the former offices of the Dutch forces deals with the role of the international community in the siege and genocide. A UN lookout made of sandbags is also on display. Information boards explain the situation on the military base during the siege.

== Anniversaries ==
On 5 July 2005, Bosnian Serb police found two bombs at the memorial site, just days ahead of a ceremony to mark the massacre's 10th anniversary, when 580 identified victims were to be buried during the ceremony, and more than 50,000 people, including international politicians and diplomats, were expected to attend. The bombs would have caused widespread loss of life and injury had they exploded, and were probably aimed at plunging the region into further bloodshed.

On 11 July 2007, 30,000 gathered to the 12th anniversary. Carla del Ponte, the chief prosecutor of International Criminal Tribunal for the former Yugoslavia, also attended. On 12 July 2007, a day after the 12th anniversary of the massacre and the burial of a further 465 victims, a group of men dressed in Chetnik uniforms marched the streets of Srebrenica. They all wore badges of military units which committed the massacre in July 1995.

On 11 July 2009, marking the 14th anniversary, some 40,000 Bosniak mourners, a number of western diplomats, and civic associations from across the region attended the burial ceremony on Saturday for 534 newly identified victims. Among the victims were 44 teenagers. No Bosnian Serb high-level officials were present at the ceremony. Ethnically related incidents such as graffiti containing threats on a mosque and the vandalism of Bosnia and Herzegovina's national flag torn from the Bratunac town-hall building occurred. Members of the Ravna Gora Chetnik movement desecrated the flag of Bosnia and Herzegovina, marched in the streets wearing T-shirts with the face of Ratko Mladić and sang Chetnik songs. A group of men and women associated with Obraz "chanted insults directed towards the victims and in support of the Chetnik movement, calling for eradication of Islam". A full report of the incident was submitted to the local District Prosecutor's Office but no one has been prosecuted. Bosnia and Herzegovina does not have a law banning fascist organizations and similar groups and the police there considered it "freedom of association".

On 11 July 2010, the 15th anniversary of the massacre, 775 coffins of Bosnian Muslims were buried, including one Bosnian Croat. Serbian President Boris Tadić attended the ceremony.

On 17 November 2012, various war veteran groups from Bosnia and Herzegovina, Serbia, and Croatia visited the memorial and paid tribute.

Collective burials have also been annually held since 2012; the twenty-second one was held on 11 July 2017 when the remains of 71 newly identified victims were buried at the Memorial Center.

=== Judge Theodor Meron ===
In June 2004, Theodor Meron, President of the International Criminal Tribunal for the former Yugoslavia (ICTY), a holocaust survivor and a former legal adviser to the government of Israel, visited Srebrenica Genocide Memorial and stated:

The gravity of genocide is reflected in the stringent requirements which must be satisfied before this conviction is imposed. These requirements – the demanding proof of specific intent and the showing that the group was targeted for destruction in its entirety or in substantial part – guard against a danger that convictions for this crime will be imposed lightly. Where these requirements are satisfied, however, the law must not shy away from referring to the crime committed by its proper name. By seeking to eliminate a part of the Bosnian Muslims, the Bosnian Serb forces committed genocide. They targeted for extinction the forty thousand Bosnian Muslims living in Srebrenica, a group which was emblematic of the Bosnian Muslims in general. They stripped all the male Muslim prisoners, military and civilian, elderly and young, of their personal belongings and identification, and deliberately and methodically killed them solely on the basis of their identity. The Bosnian Serb forces were aware, when they embarked on this genocidal venture, that the harm they caused would continue to plague the Bosnian Muslims. The Appeals Chamber states unequivocally that the law condemns, in appropriate terms, the deep and lasting injury inflicted, and calls the massacre at Srebrenica by its proper name: genocide. Those responsible will bear this stigma, and it will serve as a warning to those who may in future contemplate the commission of such a heinous act."

== Gallery ==
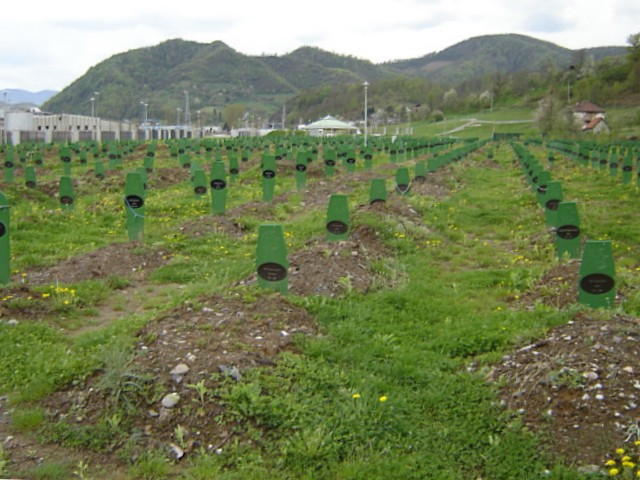
Graves at the Srebrenica–Potočari Memorial Center (2005)

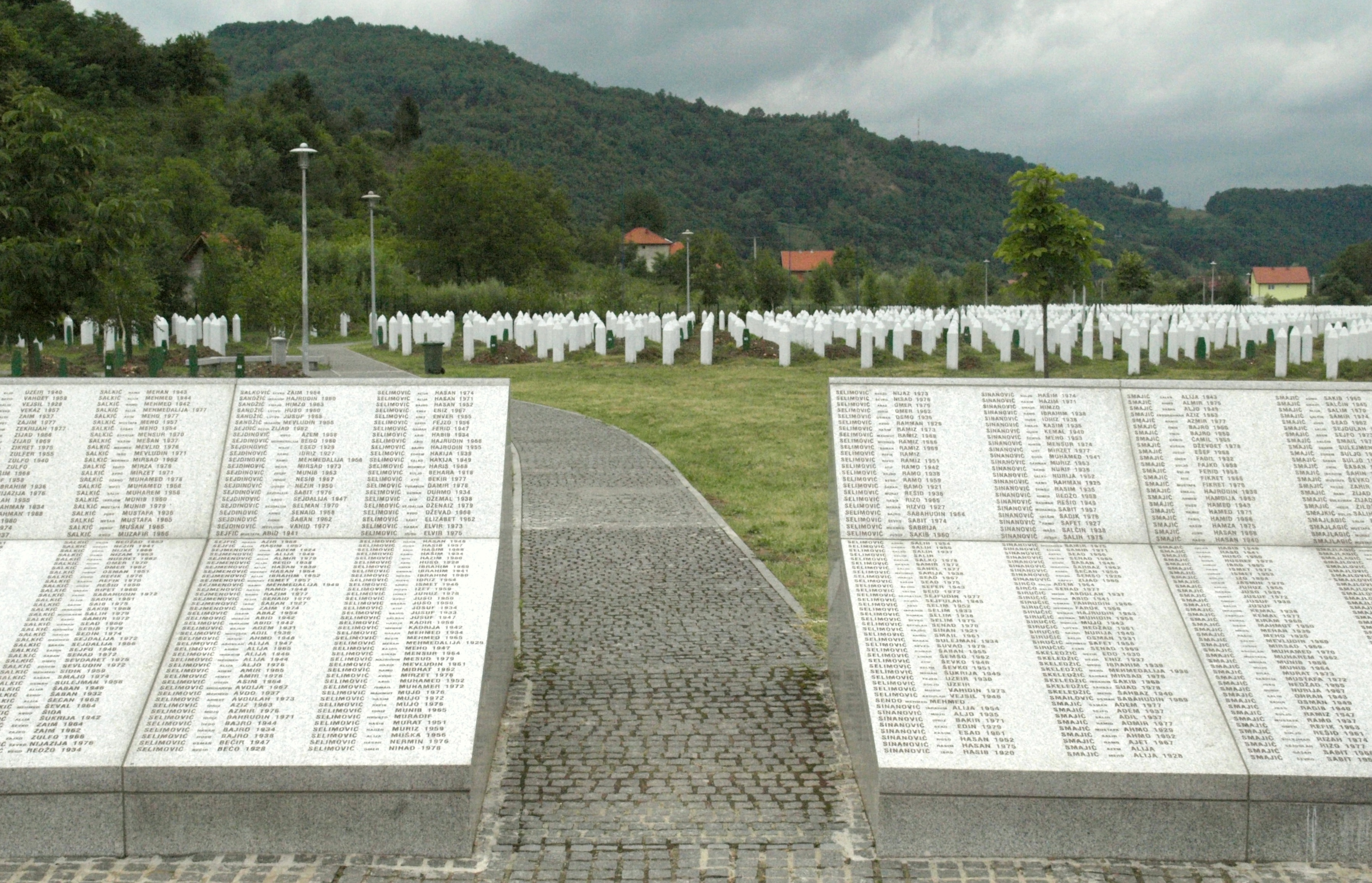
Graveyard (2008)

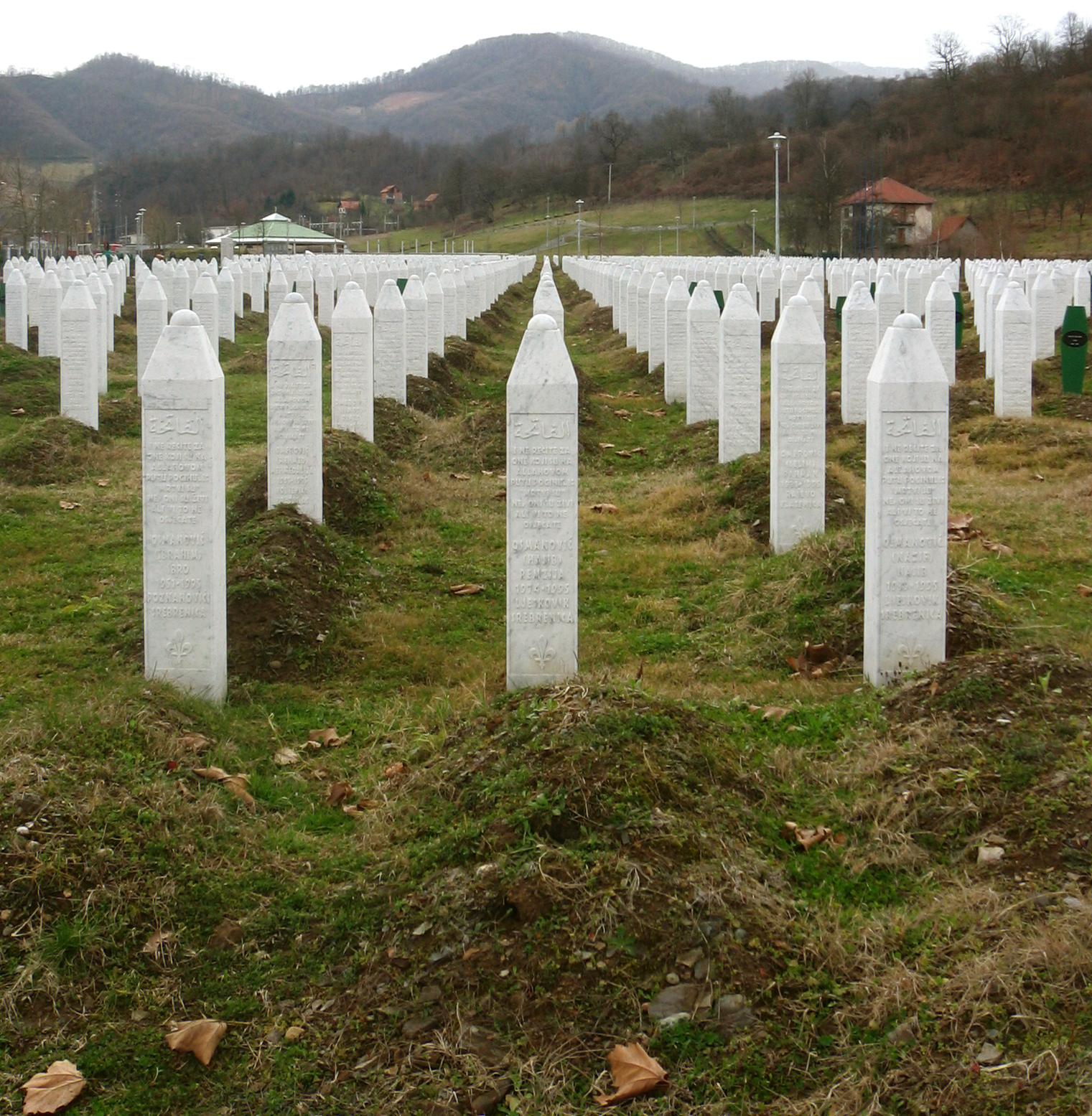
Gravestones (2009)

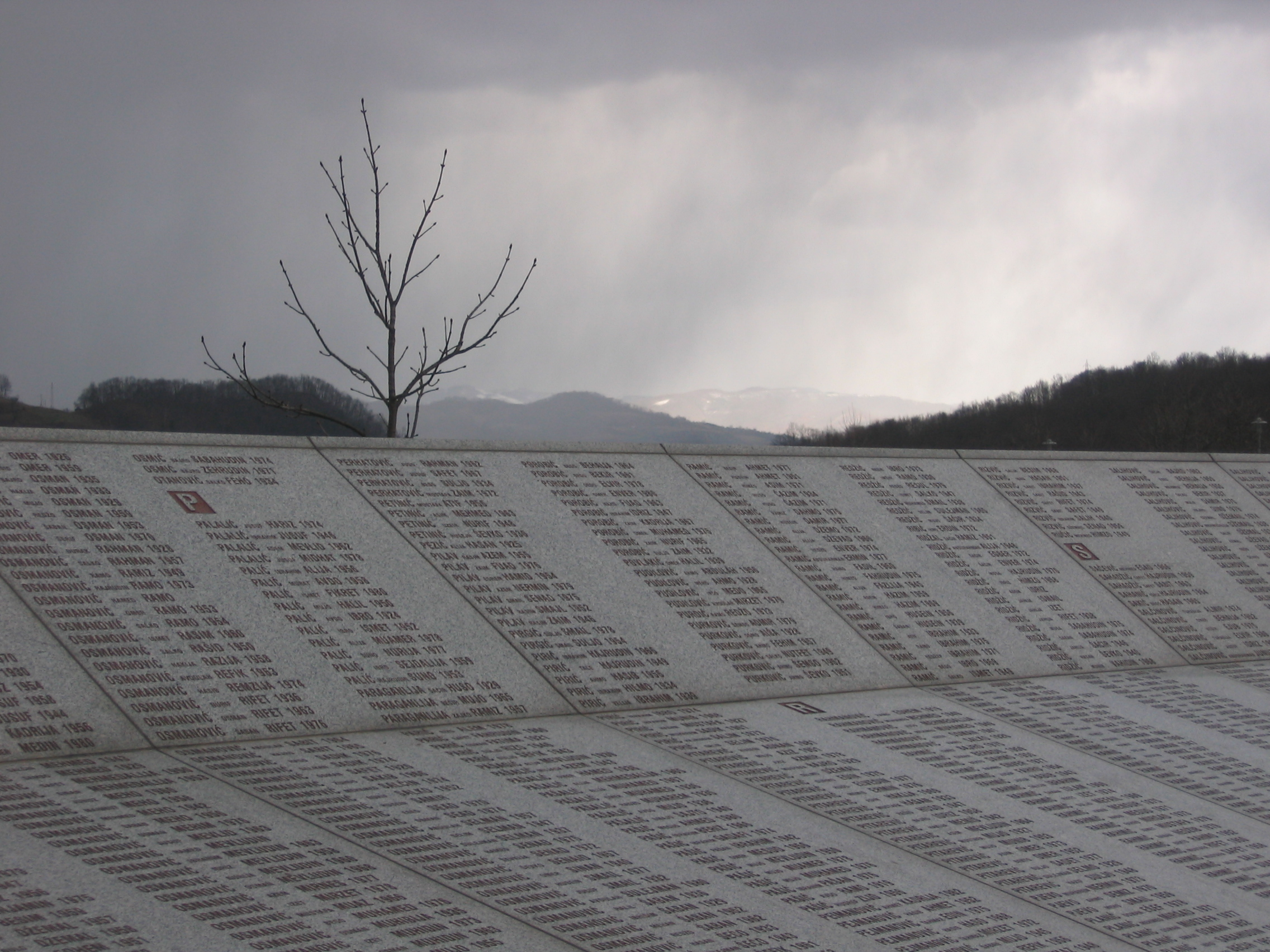
Part of the wall with names of the killed (2009)

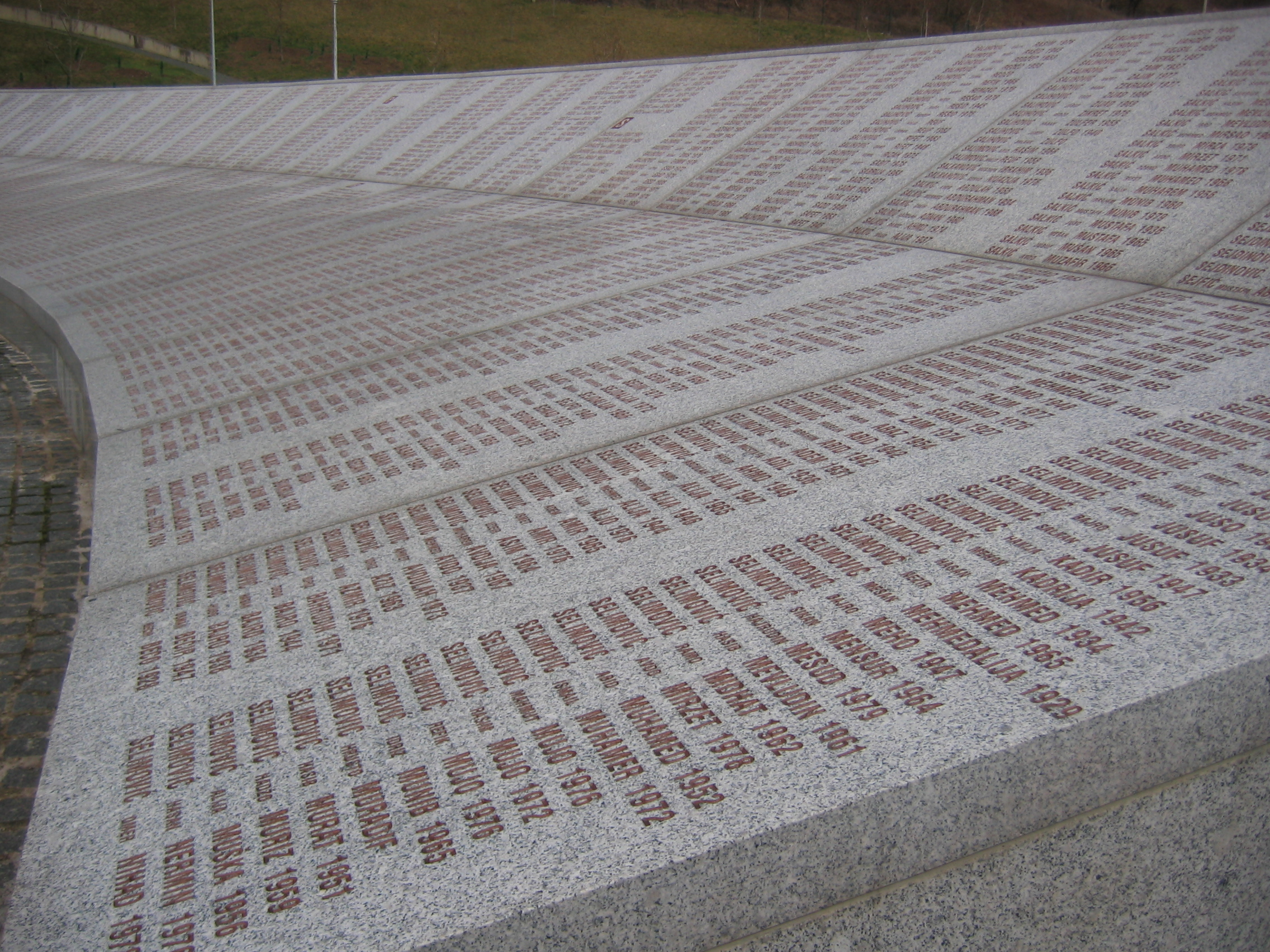
Part of the wall with names (2009)

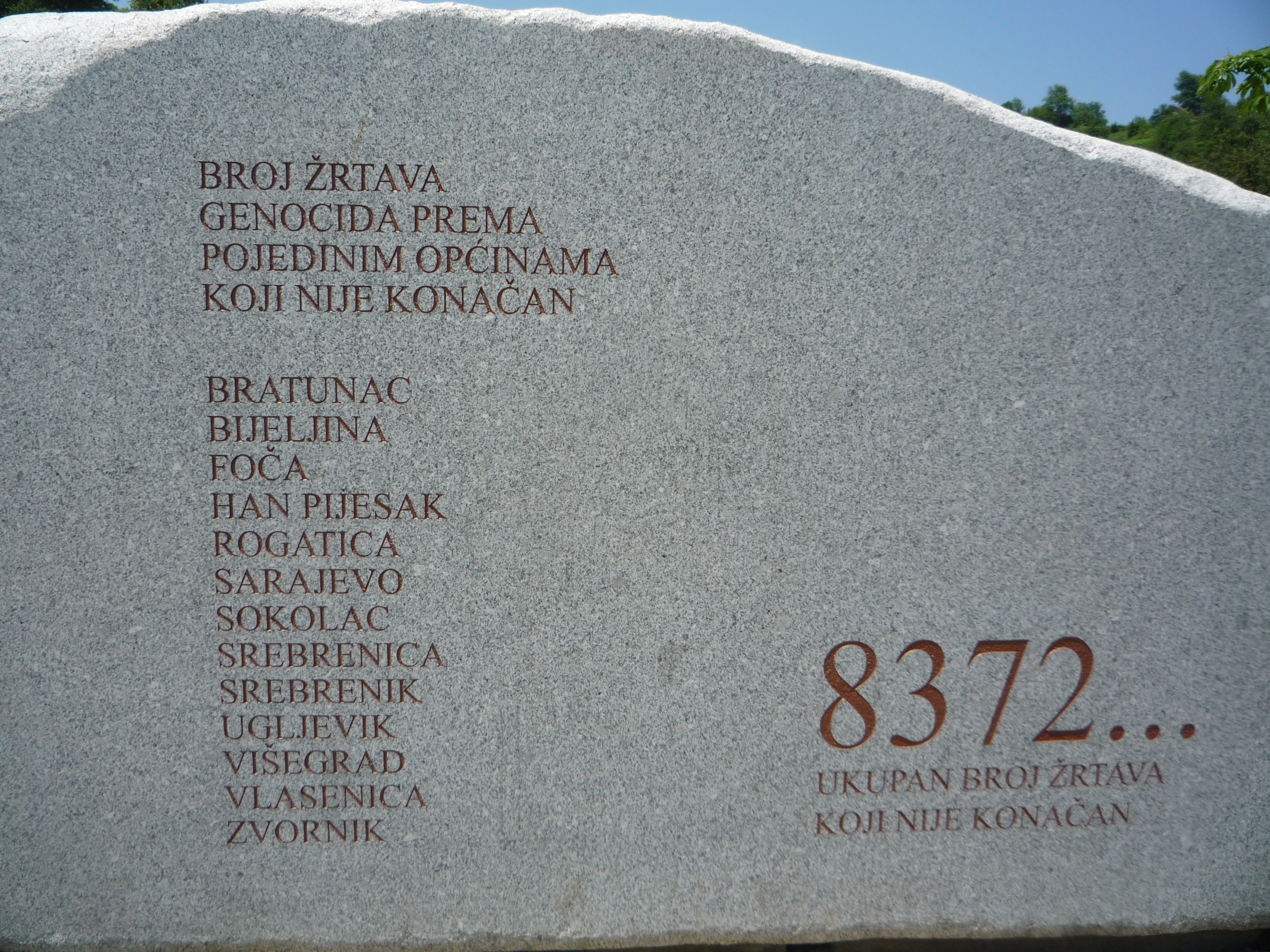
Provisional number of people massacred (2009)

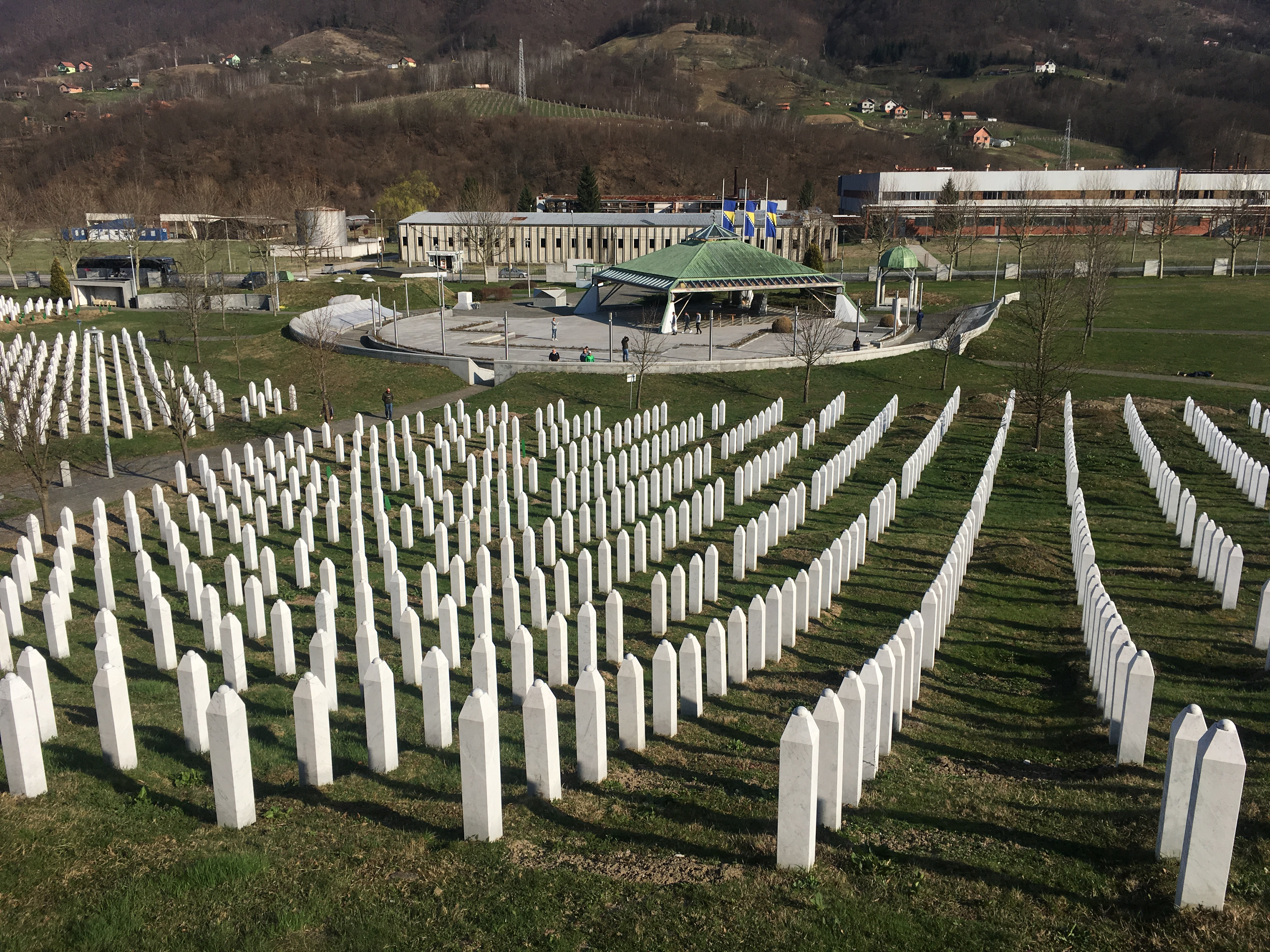
Gravestones and central memorial area (2019)

== See also ==
- Bosnian War
- Bosnian genocide
- Bosnian genocide denial
- Srebrenica massacre
- Srebrenica
- Potočari
- Mullivaikal Muttram
