= Fata Orlović =

Bosnian activist (born 1942)

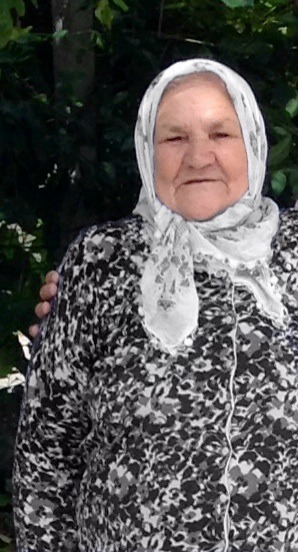
- Orlović in 2014
- Born: Fata Husejnović; 6 August 1942 (age 84); Hrnčići, Bratunac, Independent State of Croatia (now Bosnia and Herzegovina)
- Spouse: Šaćir Orlović (died)
- Children: 7

Fata Orlović (née Husejnović; born 6 August 1942) is a Bosnian woman who was in a legal battle with authorities of Republika Srpska since she moved back to her home in the Bosnian village of Konjević Polje near Bratunac five years after the end of the Bosnian War in 2000 until 2021. In 2000, Orlović, who had been living as a refugee and war widow ever since the end of the war, returned to her home in Konjević Polje to find that a Serbian Orthodox church had been built on the piece of her property. She was in the legal struggle to claim the right to the property for over 20 years.

== Pre-war life ==
Fata was born on 6 August 1942 to Muslim and ethnically Bosniak parents Šaban and Zlatka Husejnović, in the eastern Bosnian hamlet Hrnčići on the outskirts of Bratunac. She married Šaćir Orlović, with whom she had seven children including four daughters: Fatima, Zlatka, Hurija, and Senija; and three sons: Šaban, Hasan, and Ejub.

Before the war, Fata had four houses and four stables. Along with many Bosniaks living in the hill villages of the Drina Valley, she was expelled from the village by the Army of Republika Srpska during the war. Her husband Šaćir and between 22 and 28 other family members were killed and she and her seven children made refugees. Šaćir was killed in the Srebrenica massacre.

== Return to Konjević Polje and legal battle ==
When she returned to Konjević Polje in 2000, she found that her home had been completely demolished and a Serbian Orthodox church built on her land. The church was built in the summer of 1996, upon the end of the war.

Fata Orlović has fought tenaciously to have the church removed from her garden, in the face of bureaucratic resistance and physical intimidation.

She pursued a legal action through the courts which found in her favour and against the priest, ordering the church to be demolished. Although her lawyer advised her to file charges for the mistreatment, injuries and death threats she received, Fata preferred to set an example to her opponents, maintaining that "We should let things go now, it is the smartest thing to do. I am hurt, but I can not hurt anymore." She insisted that she was proud of herself and her children, and of her "smart but agonized people."

Her efforts were supported by journalists who wholeheartedly supported Fata and helped spread the news of her struggle.

In 2007, the Government of Republika Srpska agreed to fund the relocation of the church. The Office of the High Representative welcomed the agreement as a sign that Fata Orlović's right to private property would be respected.

Fata Orlović's fight against the church is regarded as a test of the potential for restoration of the rule of law in a divided Bosnia. According to James Rodehaver, human rights director for the Organization for Security and Co-operation in Europe (OSCE) in Sarajevo, the relocation of the church will be an important indicator of a return to the rule of law and the possibility of resolving the legacy of the war.

Fata Orlović had previously stated that she would get rid of the church even if it meant her own death.

She has had to build her own home on the charred remains of the old one, with her own funds and some assistance from Sulejman Tihić, former member of the government of Bosnia and Herzegovina, who provided roofing tiles, windows, and doors. For a long time she had to get by without electricity or a water supply.

== Awards ==
The US Embassy in Bosnia and Herzegovina nominated Fata Orlović for the international "The Woman of Courage" award, given to brave women who fight for their rights in a nonviolent way. Orlović was chosen as the 2007 Person of the Year by the Bosnian newspapers "Dnevni avaz" and "Preporod".

== Documentary ==
Orlović was the subject of an Al Jazeera Balkans documentary in November 2012 called The House That Fata Didn't Build.
