= Bajro Ikanović =

Bosnian Islamic State member (1976–2016)

- Born: 8 November 1976; Hrnčići, Bratunac, Bosnia and Herzegovina, Yugoslavia
- Died: 27 February 2016 (aged 39); Iraq
- Years active: 2013–2016

Bajro Ikanović (8 November 1976 – 27 February 2016) was a Bosnian Islamist, terrorist, and senior commander in the Islamic State in Syria and Iraq.

Ikanović was born in Hrnčići, Bratunac, eastern Bosnia and Herzegovina. Ikanović had previously been sentenced to eight years for terrorism offenses linked to the Bektašević case on 10 January 2007, which was reduced to four years on appeal on 21 May 2007. He was released from prison in 2011. According to the prosecution, "Mirsad Bektašević and Abdulkadir Cesur [had] the intention of committing a terrorist act on the territory of BiH or some other European country…the aim of this attach [sic] was to force the Bosnian government or government of another state to withdraw their forces from Iraq and Afghanistan."

Ikanović later took part in the Islamic State's operations. He was quoted in 2013 as saying that, by allowing jihad volunteers to leave the Balkans, "your intelligence agencies made a mistake thinking that they would be rid of us, however, the problem for them will be the return of individuals trained for war.” According to the United States Department of the Treasury, Ikanovic has held various leadership positions within the Islamic State in Iraq and Syria over the past several years, including on the Shura Council in 2014. In December 2013, Abu Omar al-Shishani promoted Ikanović to head of the largest ISIS military training camp in northern Syria. The State Investigation and Protection Agency opened an investigation against him on 10 June 2014 and the Prosecutor's Office submitted a report on the crime committed and the perpetrator due to the suspicion of having committed a criminal offense under Article 202d. CC BiH (Organizing and belonging to a terrorist group).

He was reported in one source to have died in Syria back in March 2016. In May 2016, Bosnian media reported different 'unconfirmed information' by the Bosnian State Investigation and Protection Agency that he had been killed in Iraq instead. As of 2024, his fate is unknown.
