= Abu Ahmad al-Alwani =

Islamic State commander (1972–2015)

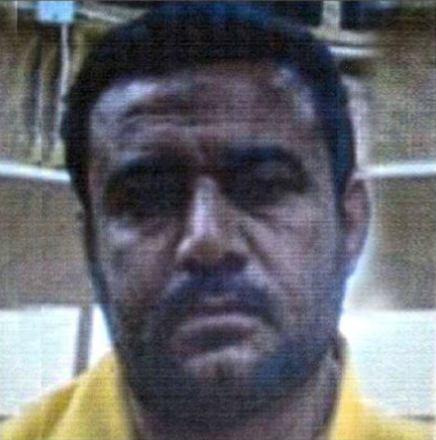
- Born: Waleed Jassem al-Alwani; 1972; Ramadi, Iraq
- Died: 27 December 2015 (aged 42–43); Ramadi, Iraq
- Military career
- Allegiance: Baathist Iraq (until 2003) Al-Qaeda (2006): Al-Qaeda in Iraq (2006); Islamic State of Iraq (2006–2013); Islamic State of Iraq and the Levant (2013–2014) Islamic State (2014–2015)
- Branch: Iraqi Army (until 2003); IS military (2014–2015)
- Rank: Commander
- Conflicts: Iraq War; Syrian Civil War

Waleed Jassem al-Alwani (1972 – 27 December 2015), also known by the nom de guerre Abu Ahmad al-Alwani, was a senior commander in the Islamic State (IS) and a prominent member of its military council. He was a former member of the Iraqi Army under Saddam Hussein.

Reports circulated in February 2015 in British tabloids that Al-Alwani was killed in an air strike. However, his death was never confirmed by the U.S. or the Islamic State and later reports named Alwani as a "very senior officer" in IS.

On 27 December 2015, after clearing IS from large parts of the city, the Iraqi Interior Ministry claimed that it had killed al-Alwani. A well-placed observer, claimed in early 2016 that al-Alwani was indeed dead, and had been replaced by Abu Umar al-Hadithi, about whom nothing is known.
