= Konjević Polje =

Village in Bratunac, Bosnia and Herzegovina

Konjević Polje Коњевић Поље
- Village
- Location within Republika Srpska Location within Bosnia and Herzegovina
- Coordinates: 44°15′30″N 19°06′19″E
- Country: Bosnia and Herzegovina
- Entity: Republika Srpska
- Municipality: Bratunac
- Time zone: UTC+1 (CET)
  - Summer (DST): UTC+2 (CEST)

Konjević Polje (Serbian Cyrillic: Коњевић Поље) is a village in the municipality of Bratunac, in the Drina Valley of northeastern Bosnia and Herzegovina. It practically merged with the neighboring village of Konjevići.

== Bosnian War ==
During the Bosnian Serb Army's campaign of ethnic cleansing in 1992, Konjević Polje became cut off from the main area of the Bosnian government-held territory and was part of the enclave of Srebrenica. The expulsion of the Bosniaks from the area along the Drina River had been the publicly proclaimed goal of the Republika Srpska from the start of the war. Two of the “strategic objectives or priorities of the Serb people in Bosnia and Herzegovina" were to "Establish state borders separating the Serb people from the other two ethnic communities" and "Establish a corridor in the Drina River valley, that is, eliminate the Drina as a border separating Serb states."

In his 25 November 2003 statement to the Office of the Prosecutor at the International Criminal Tribunal for the Former Yugoslavia, the Bosnian Serb war criminal Miroslav Deronjić affirmed that goal and referred to it as "liberation". He described the "liberation" of the area of Eastern Bosnia along the Drina corridor as involving a two-part plan devised in 1991 and 1992, involving the Bosnian Serbs first taking power in the municipalities in the Podrinje and then expelling the Bosniak population by force, specifically by forcibly transferring the women and children and often detaining and killing the men. In the so-called "Deronjić Statement", he specifically referred to the "liberation of Konjević Polje" (paras. 154, 156).

During the Bosnian Serb Army offensive of early 1993, the villages of Konjević Polje and Cerska were captured. Their Bosniak residents fled to Srebrenica and added to the town's already overcrowded refugee population. Refugees from Konjević Polje and Cerska were sheltering in the Srebrenica elementary school when it was shelled on 12 April 1993.

After the fall of Srebrenica, the road between Bratunac and Konjević Polje was a key place in which the Bosnian Serb Army forces attacked and broke the column of refugees fleeing towards government territory. Many of the refugees were captured and killed in nearby locations. The school in Konjević Polje was used to hold detainees before their execution.

== See also ==
- Fata Orlović
