= Iraqi insurgency (2017–present) =

Ongoing low-scale insurgency in Iraq

- Part of the Iraqi conflict and war against the Islamic State
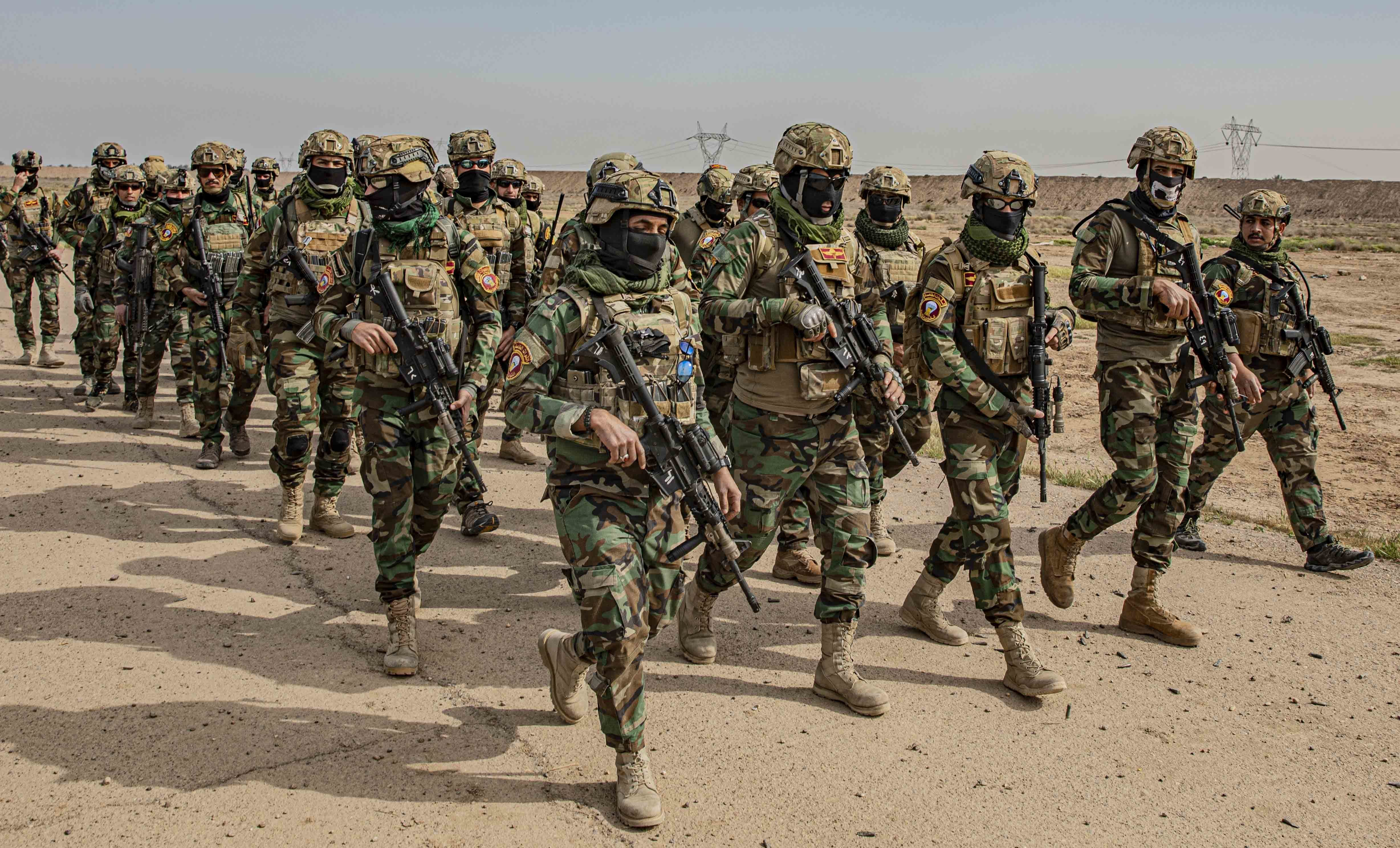
- The ISOF, which played the biggest role in curbing IS, in a military parade
Date	9 December 2017 – present (8 years, 10 months, 3 weeks and 1 day)
Location	Mountainous regions of Kirkuk, Salahaddin, Diyala, and Nineveh.
Status	Ongoing as a hit-and-run campaign

Belligerents
Iraq; Iraqi Police; Iraqi Armed Forces; ISOF; PMF; IRI; Kurdistan Region; Peshmerga; Tribal Mobilization; Nineveh guards	Islamic State; White Flags (2017–2018)

Commanders and leaders
Ali al-Zaidi Abdel Emir Yarallah Abdul-Amir al-Shammari Thabit Al Abassi Karim Abboud al-Tamimi Falih Alfayyadh Qais Khazali Hadi al-Amiri Nechirvan Barzani Sirwan Barzani Jaafar Sheikh Mustafa; Former: (Iraq) Haider al-Abadi; (Iraq) Adil Abdul-Mahdi; (Iraq) Mustafa Al-Kadhimi; (Iraq) Mohammed Shia al-Sudani; Qasim al-Araji; Yassin al-Yasiri; Othman al-Ghanmi; Erfan al-Hiyali; Najah al-Shammari; Juma Inad; Talib Shaghati; Abdel-Wahab al-Saadi; Masoud Barzani; Killed: Abu Mahdi al-Muhandis † (Popular Mobilization Forces commander, killed in American Airstrike); Lt. Col. Zaid Jassim Al-Shammari (Commander of 3rd Infantry Regiment); Abu Sadiq al-Khashkhashi † (commander of the Popular Mobilization Forces's 9th brigade); Maj. Gen. Ali Khalifa † (commander of the PMF); Lt. Col. Haidar Adel Mohammad (Senior Iraqi Army Commander) †; Col. Yasser al-Jourani (executed)	Abu Hafs al-Hashimi al-Qurashi; Hiwa Chor; Assi al-Qawali (POW) Killed: Abu Bakr al-Baghdadi † Abu Ibrahim al-Hashimi al-Qurashi † (killed in Syria) Abu al-Hasan al-Hashimi al-Qurashi † (killed in Syria) Abu al-Hussein al-Husseini al-Qurashi † Abu Ahmad al-Alwani † (killed in Iraq) Abu Yasser al-Issawi † (Former deputy leader of IS) Abu Hamza al-Qurashi † (Killed in Syria) Abu Fatima al-Jaheishi † Zulfi Hoxha † Bajro Ikanović † Abu Obeida Baghdad (POW) (executed) Ahmad Hamid Husayn Abd-al-Jalil al-Ithawi † (Chief of IS in Iraq) Omar Jawad al-Mashhadani † (Chief IS suicide attack organiser in Baghdad) Muthanna Shataran al-Marawi † (IS military commander in charge of the Al-Rutba region Osama al-Mulla † (IS's deputy security chief) 'Hawi the Great' † (High ranking IS Emir) (Islamic State) Rahel Mohammad Rostam † (Islamic State) Abdulrahman Rahim Qader † Abu Hudhayfah Al-Ansari † (Islamic State) Mullah Ismail Susayi (POW)

Units involved
Iraq; Iraqi Armed Forces; Iraqi Army; ISOF; Iraqi Air Force; PMF; Badr Organization; 21st Brigade; Liwa Ali al-Akbar; Iraqi Police; Islamic Resistance in Iraq; Asa'ib Ahl al-Haq; Kata'ib Hezbollah; Kurdistan Region; Peshmerga; Tribal Mobilization; Nineveh guards	Islamic State; Military of the Islamic State

Strength
Iraq: 530,000 personnel (including paramilitary forces)	Islamic State: around 2,500 ISIS fighters remain active in Syria and Iraq

Casualties and losses
Unknown; 12 killed, 2 HH-60 Pave Hawk helicopters crashed; 1 killed; 3 killed	7,516 killed (Iraqi government claim)

The Iraqi insurgency is an ongoing low-intensity insurgency that began in 2017 after the Islamic State (IS) lost its territorial control in the War in Iraq, during which IS and allied White Flags fought the Iraqi military (largely backed by the United States, United Kingdom and other countries conducting airstrikes against IS) and allied paramilitary forces (largely backed by Iran).

== Context ==
The insurgency is a direct continuation of the War in Iraq from 2013 to 2017, with IS continuing armed opposition against the Shia-led Iraqi Government. Along with the Islamic State, other insurgents fighting the government include a group known as the White Flags which is reportedly composed of former IS members and Kurdish rebels and is believed by the government of Iraq to be part of Ansar al-Islam and possibly affiliated with al-Qaeda. The group operates mostly in the Kirkuk Governorate and has used an assortment of guerilla tactics against government forces. In September 2017, Abu Bakr al-Baghdadi, the leader of IS, called on IS supporters around the world to launch attacks on Western news media and continued in his message the IS must focus on combating the two-pronged attack on the Muslim Ummah; these statements marked a departure from previous rhetoric which was focused on the state building of IS and heralded a shift in IS's strategy toward a classical insurgency.

== Course of the insurgency ==
Since IS's loss of all territory in Iraq in late 2017 which was declared as Iraq's victory over IS and widely seen as an end to the war, and declared as such by Iraq's Prime Minister Haidar al-Abadi, multiple incidents of violence have occurred being carried out by the conflicting sides, in spite of Iraq's declaration of victory over IS the group is widely seen as far from gone and continues to retain a presence throughout Iraq, and still capable of carrying out attacks and skirmishes with pro-government forces. IS has been waging a guerrilla war with a strong presence in the governorates of Kirkuk, Diyala, Saladin, and Sulaymaniyah, with local forces largely ill-equipped and inexperienced, IS has also taken advantage of the areas' rough terrain to carry out operations. IS has also made a notable presence in the cities of Kirkuk, Hawija and Tuz Khurmato and has carried out attacks at night in rural areas.

IS fighters also reportedly move through villages during the day without interference from security forces, and locals have been asked by IS to give fighters food and give information on the whereabouts of Iraqi personnel, locals have also stated that IS fighters will frequently enter into Mosques and ask for Zakat to fund the insurgency. IS's operations are reported to include assassinations, kidnappings, raids and ambushes.

As of 2021, U.S. officials warned that IS "remains capable of waging a prolonged insurgency” but also described IS in Iraq as "diminished”. Iraqi intelligence estimated that IS has 2,000–3,000 fighters in Iraq.

Following IS's defeat in December 2017, they have been greatly weakened and violence in Iraq has been sharply reduced. 20 civilians lost their lives from violence-related incidents during October 2024, the lowest figure in 21 years. By 2024, attacks claimed by IS have gone down by 94% compared to 2019. In 2025, a UN report submitted to the United Nations Security Council, assessed that the status of ISIS in Iraq is “at its weakest”, with fewer than five claimed attacks.

== Timeline ==
=== 2018 ===
In 2018, 3,643 IS militants, 937 Iraqi security forces, 11 American service members, 1 British service member were killed. The death toll in this year was noted to be the lowest since 2003, when the United States invaded the country.

Notable (Note: Defined as passing Wikipedia's notability guidelines and warranting an independent article) events this year include:

- 2018 Baghdad bombings: On 15 January 2018, two suicide bombings took place at al-Tayaran Square of Baghdad, killing 36 people and injuring more than 105 others.
- 2018 Asdira funeral bombing: On 12 April 2018, a bombing killed 25 people and wounded 18 others. The attack took place at a funeral for Iraqi fighters who had been killed by ISIS.

=== 2019 ===
In 2019, 1,129 IS militants and 387 Iraqi security forces were killed.

Notable events this year include:

- 2019 Karbala bombing: On 20 September, 2019, a bomb exploded on a minibus near Karbala, Iraq, killing 12 civilians and injuring at least five others. The bombing was one of the worst attacks against civilians since the end of the War in Iraq of 2013 to 2017.
- 2019 K-1 Air Base attack: A rocket attack was carried out on the K-1 Air Base in Kirkuk province in Iraq on 27 December 2019. The air base was one of many Iraqi military bases that host Operation Inherent Resolve (OIR) personnel and, according to the coalition, was attacked by more than 30 rockets. The identity of the perpetrators is disputed.

=== 2020 ===
In 2020, 777 IS militants and 412 Iraqi security forces were killed.

Notable events this year include:

- Withdrawal of United States troops from Iraq (2020–2021): On 20 March 2020, CJTF-OIR confirmed that certain troops would be withdrawing from Iraq due to the COVID-19 pandemic.

=== 2021 ===
In 2021, 487 IS militants and 409 Iraqi security forces were killed.

Notable events this year include:

- January 2021 Baghdad bombings: Two suicide bombers attacked an open-air market in central Baghdad, Iraq. They killed at least 32 people and injured another 110. This was the Iraqi capital's first terrorist attack since 2019.

=== 2022 ===
In 2022, 564 IS militants and 183 Iraqi security forces were killed. Furthermore, one US Marine died of non-combat related causes.

Notable events this year include:

- 2022 Diyala massacre: On January 21, 2022, several Islamic State gunmen raided an Iraqi Army base in rural al-Azim district, Diyala Governorate. At least 11 Iraqi soldiers were killed in their sleep.
- 2022 Kirkuk bombing: At least nine police officers were killed when a convoy hit a roadside bomb near Kirkuk, Iraq. The bombing was followed by a gun fight. One Islamic State militant was reported killed.

=== 2023 ===
In 2023, 281 IS militants, 61 Iraqi security forces and 3 French soldiers were killed.

=== 2024 ===
In 2024, 235 IS militants, 58 Iraqi security personnel and 42 civilians were killed. A further 166 IS militants were executed in prisons across Iraq.

Notable events this year include:

- 2024 Anbar raid: On 31 August 2024, a raid occurred in Al Anbar Governorate where at least fifteen Islamic State militants were killed and six U.S. soldiers were injured.

=== 2025 ===
In 2025, at least 90 IS fighters were killed in Iraqi security operations against the group.

91 ISIS Fighters were also arrested during 2025.

Notable events this year include:

- 2025 Duhok axe attack: On 1 April 2025, a Syrian national went on a short-lived spree of attacks against Assyrians celebrating the annual Kha b-Nisan festival in Duhok. Two people are confirmed to have been injured from the attacks, while other sources suggest that an additional third person was from the Asayish was injured. A source close to Iraqi Shafaq News stated that the attacker had conducted the attack as a terrorist operation linked to IS, but investigations have so far failed to uncover a specific motive.

=== 2026 ===
The Islamic State claimed an attack against the Iraqi military in May, its first attack in 2026.

== Gallery ==
Coalition airstrike on IS positions, Qanus Island, Iraq, September 2019

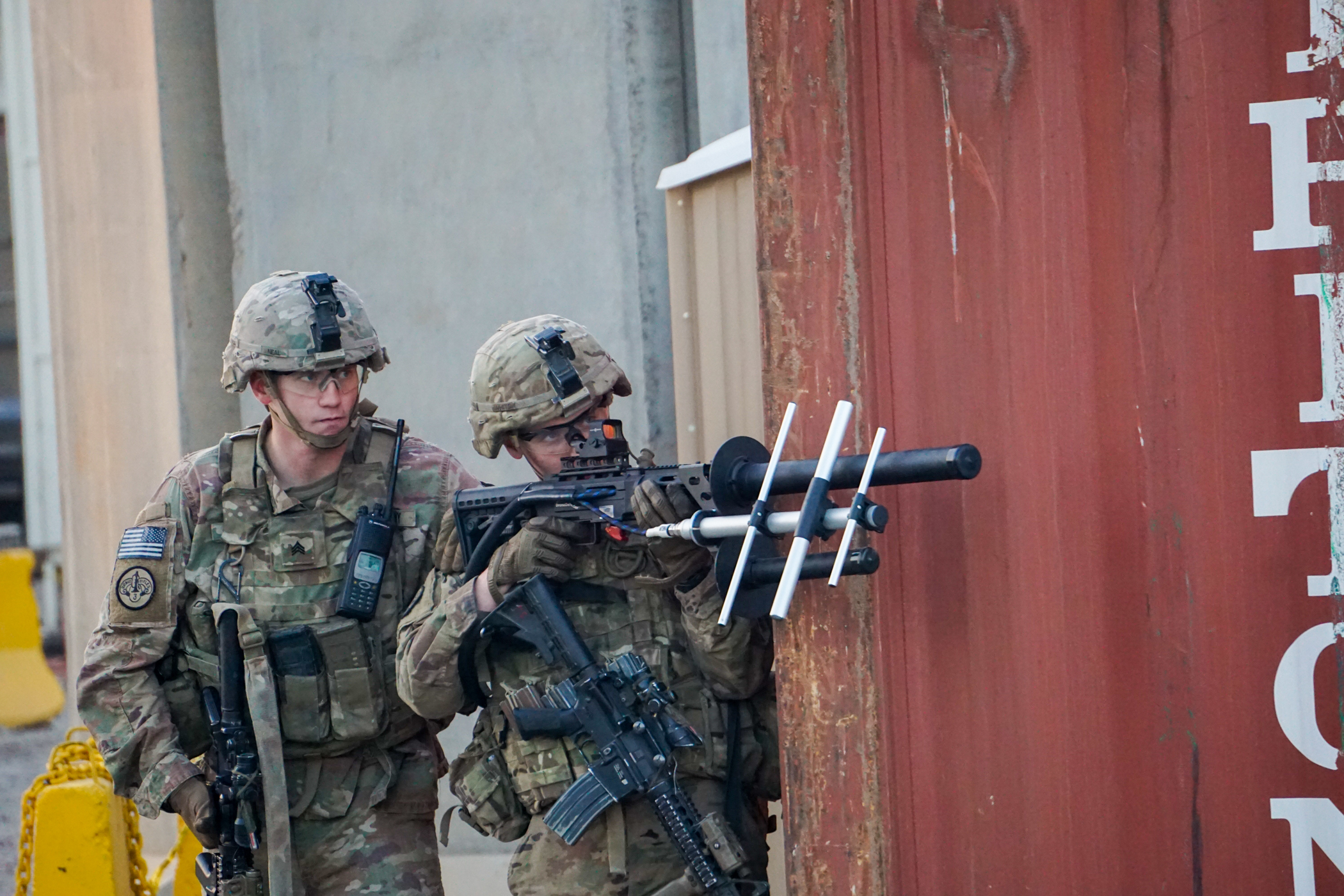
1st Squadron, 3rd Cavalry Regiment of the US Army drill with the Battelle Drone Defender in Iraq, 30 October 2018. US troops anticipate IS units deploying drones during reconnaissance or attacks

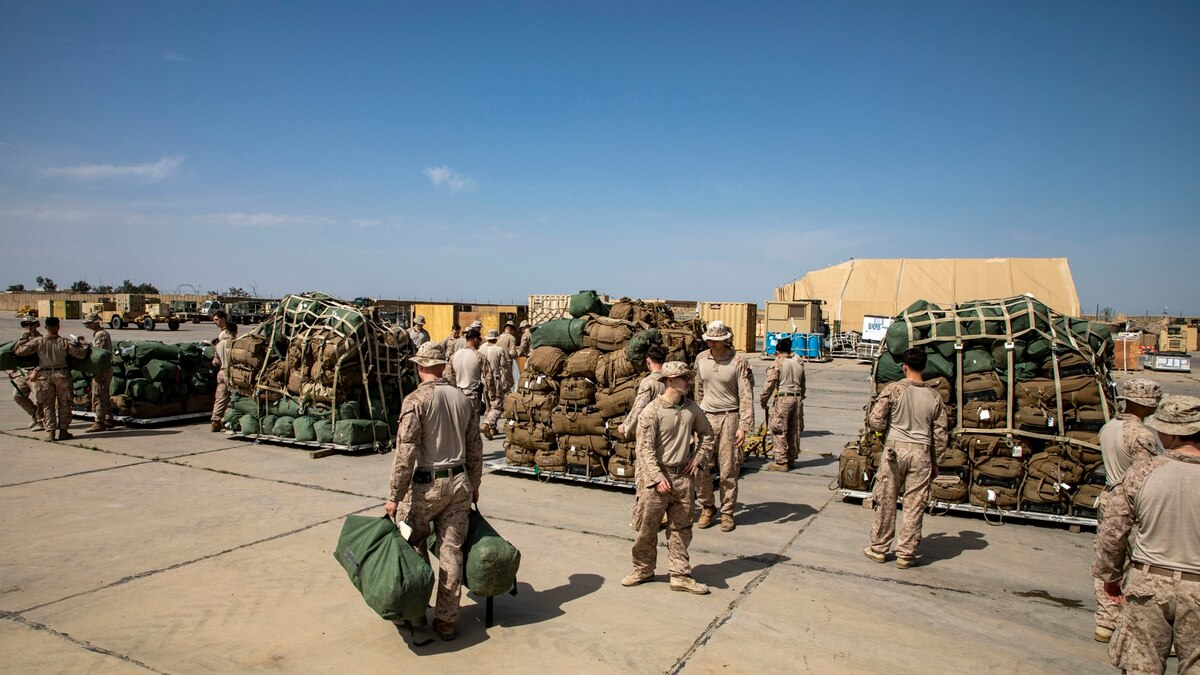
Marines of 2nd Battalion, 7th Marines packing up gear to withdraw from Al-Taqaddum Air Base, 24 March 2020

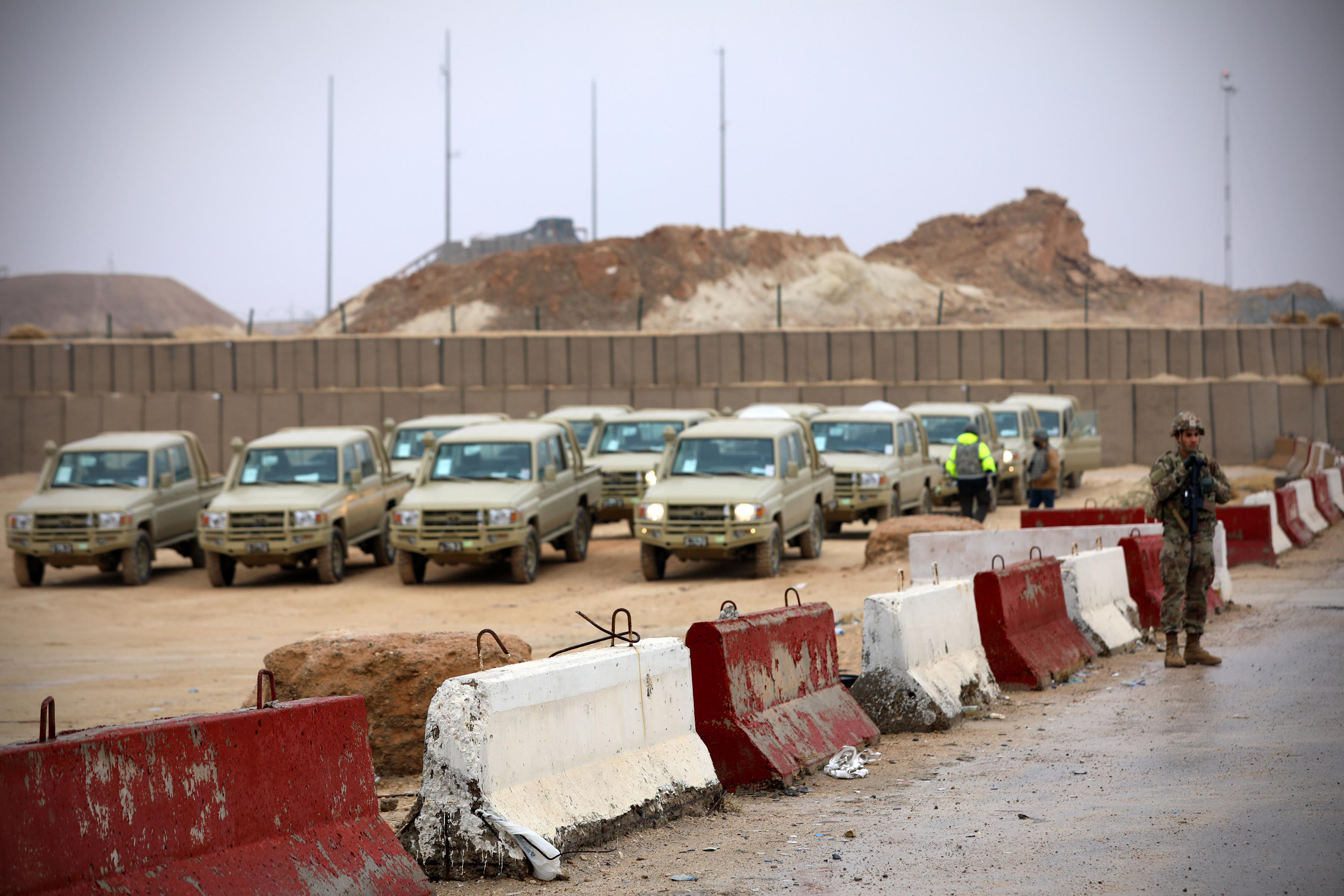
On 6 February 2021, the coalition's CTEF (Counter-IS Train and Equip Fund) program delivered 15 land cruisers and 36 M249 Squad Automatic Weapons to Iraqi security forces at Al Asad Airbase.

== See also ==
- Iraq Body Count project
- 2015–2018 Iraqi protests
- 2019–2021 Iraqi protests
- Eastern Syria insurgency, a similar insurgency in neighboring Syria
- Casualty recording
- List of terrorist incidents (1970–present)
