= 2019 Karbala bombing =

Terrorist incident in Iraq

- Part of the Iraqi insurgency (2017–present)
- Location: Karbala, Iraq
- Date: 20 September 2019
- Deaths: 12
- Injuries: 5

On 20 September, 2019, a bomb exploded on a minibus near Karbala, Iraq, killing 12 civilians and injuring at least five others. The bombing was one of the worst attacks against civilians since the end of the War in Iraq of 2013 to 2017.

== Attack ==
An unidentified man boarded a minibus in the southern Iraqi city of Karbala, disembarking a little later leaving a bag behind. It exploded shortly afterwards, killing 12 and wounding five others. A suspect was later arrested and the Islamic State claimed responsibility.
