= Qanus Island =

Island in the Tigris River in Iraq

Coordinates: 35°40′16″N 43°16′29″E

Coalition airstrike on Islamic State positions, Qanus Island, Iraq, September 2019

Qanus Island is a river island located in the Tigris River in Saladin Governorate, northern Iraq.

After it became a staging area for the terrorist organization Islamic State during an insurgency in the 2010s, it was bombed on 10 September 2019. American F-15 and F-35 fighter jets dropped 40 tonnes of explosives (more than 80,000 pounds of GPS-guided bombs) by the US-led coalition forces. According to Major General Eric T Hill, "We're denying Daesh the ability to hide on Qanus Island".
