= Postcards from the Grave =

Book by Emir Suljagić

- Author: Emir Suljagić
- Translator: Lejla Haverić
- Language: Bosnian
- Publisher: Saqi Books
- Publication date: July 31, 2005
- Pages: 196
- ISBN: 0-86356-519-0

Postcards from the Grave is a book by Emir Suljagić, relating to his experiences in Srebrenica, published on 31 July 2005 by Saqi Books (196 pages). It was translated into English by Lejla Haverić and includes an afterword by Ed Vulliamy.

Emir Suljagić is a journalist living in Sarajevo. His book is the first account of the genocide in Srebrenica to be published in English by a Bosnian who lived through it. It describes how in 1992, as a 17-year-old fleeing from the ethnic cleansing of the Drina Valley by the Bosnian Serb Army and its Serbian allies, together with his family he came to find shelter as a refugee in the besieged Bosnian Muslim-Bosniak enclave of Srebrenica. It gives an account of the hardships of daily life in the enclave and the personal impact on Suljagić, up until July 1995, when Suljagić survived the fall of the town and the subsequent genocidal Srebrenica massacre in which over 8,000, mainly men and boys, were killed by the Bosnian Serb army. As an interpreter for the UN, Suljagić himself was evacuated with the Dutch UNPROFOR battalion while almost every man he had ever known and many women too lost their lives.

The book is an unsentimental portrayal of life in a town where 'there were no laws and public authority was based on mutual balance of power.' For example, the author describes how his uncle was shot dead trying to get to humanitarian aid dropped by air into the enclave; the killer enjoyed impunity because of connections with leaders of the municipality. Nevertheless, Suljagić expresses respect for Naser Orić, commander of Srebrenica's defence, described as a charismatic and intimidating presence.

Suljagić's honesty about himself and others makes for a poignant contrast when he gives an insight into the emotions of people living in fear and isolation. He describes how people would come from across the enclave to get an opportunity to speak on the town's ham radio - the one remaining line of communication - to family and friends elsewhere. "No one ever said, "I love you." Never did an open love declaration pass through those wires, aerials and cables. And yet nowhere and never had there been more love concentrated on one spot than in that half-dark, grey room with bars on the windows."

He decided to write his testimony of the event, which he has dedicated to the victims of the massacre - "ten thousand people, ten thousand coffins, ten thousand gravestones", in order to counter the revisionist history being put forth by such figures as George Bogdanich. The book has received attention in the press and in after-action reports of the event as being accurate and undercutting many arguments of revisionists such as Lewis MacKenzie.
