= Abu Yasser al-Issawi =

ISIS commander (1978–2021)

- Born: Jabbar Salman Saleh Ali Al-Issawi; 1978; Fallujah, Iraq
- Died: 28 January 2021 (aged 43) Al-Chai Valley, Kirkuk, Iraq
- Allegiance: Islamic State (unknown-28 January 2021)
- Rank: Deputy Leader of the Islamic State in Iraq (until 28 January 2021)
- Conflicts: Iraqi insurgency

Abu Yasser al-Issawi (Arabic: أبو ياسر العيساوي, romanized: Abū Yāsir al-ʿĪsāwī; born Jabbar Salman Saleh Ali Al-Issawi, Arabic: جابر سلمان صالح علي العيساوي, 1978 – 28 January 2021) was a senior IS commander and Iraqi terrorist with the title of deputy caliph, and leader of the IS group in Iraq. He was killed in a military strike by Iraqi security forces in Al-Chai Valley, southern Kirkuk. The successful military strike and his death was announced by Iraqi Prime Minister Mustafa Al-Kadhimi after an intelligence-led operation.

However, The New York Times reported that al-Issawi, who was 43 years old and originally from Fallujah, died from an American airstrike, days after the Baghdad bombings.
