= 2018 Baghdad bombings =

Terrorist attacks in Baghdad

January 15, 2018 Baghdad bombings
- Part of the ISIL insurgency in Iraq (2017–present)
- Baghdad (Iraq)
- Location: Baghdad, Iraq
- Date: 15 January 2018
- Target: Civilians
- Attack type: Suicide bombings
- Deaths: 38 (including 2 attackers)
- Injuries: 105+
- Perpetrator: Islamic State of Iraq and the Levant

On Monday January 15, 2018, two suicide bombings took place at al-Tayaran Square of Baghdad, killing 36 people and injuring more than 105 others. These attacks were later claimed by the jihadist group Islamic State (IS).

== Attacks ==
On Monday January 15, 2018, two suicide bombings took place at al-Tayaran Square of Baghdad, killing 36 people and injuring more than 105 others. The attackers struck during rush hour in the city's Tayran Square, which is usually crowded by laborers seeking work. No group immediately claimed responsibility for the attack but it bore all the hallmarks of the Islamic State group, which has claimed many such attacks in the past.

== Responsibility claim ==
Two days later (on Wednesday January 17, 2018) the jihadist group Islamic State (IS) "claimed responsibility for the twin suicide bombings in Baghdad this week", though the New York Times suggested that the delay, and a number of errors in the claim, may show that the group's "media apparatus has been disrupted". According to the New York Times, which relied on a translation of the IS statement provided by SITE Intelligence Group, the IS claim's errors included that the attack "had occurred at Aden Square in Baghdad, where the police said an attack was foiled on Saturday, rather than in Tayaran Square, where Monday’s explosions took place", and that IS "said that there were three attackers, not two ... and said that the first two detonated their explosive vests in quick succession, while the third hit another gathering in the same area sometime after the first two explosions". IS referred to "the open-air market that was attacked as a gathering of 'rafidha' and of 'polytheists', two words they use to refer to Shiite Muslims in a derogatory manner".
