= Timeline of the Islamic State (2020) =

This is a timeline of IS-related events that occurred in the year 2020.

== Timeline ==
=== January ===
- On 9 January in a gunfight at a Niger military base, 89 Niger Armed Forces soldiers and 77 IS militants killed during the battle.

=== February ===
- On 2 February, two people were stabbed in Streatham, London, and one more had minor injuries. The perpetrator, Sudesh Amman, who was a fighter of Islamic State and had previously praised it, was shot dead by police.
- On 9 February an individual conducted a vehicle-borne improvised explosive device (VBIED) suicide attack targeting a military outpost in southern Algeria, near the border with Mali, killing himself and one Algerian soldier.

=== March ===
- On 6 March, IS gunmen killed 32 people and injured over 80 people at a ceremony in Kabul, Afghanistan.
- On 25 March, IS killed 25 people in a gurdwara in Kabul, Afghanistan.

=== April ===
- On April 27, a French man who pledged allegiance to IS intentionally rammed his car into two police officials, gravely injuring both, near Paris.

=== May ===
- On 12 May, gunmen executed a mass shooting at a hospital's maternity ward. 80 patients were evacuated, 24 victims, including newborn babies, mothers, and nurses, killed by the gunmen and all three attackers killed by the army; An hour after the Kabul attack, a suicide bombing took place in Kuz Kunar, Nangarhar Province at the funeral of a police commander, killing 32 mourners and injuring 133 others.

=== August ===
- On August 3, the IS launched an attack on an Afghan prison that left at least 29 dead.
- On August 6, IS-SP attacked an EAF checkpoint with small arms resulting in the deaths of 15 EAF soldiers near Wasit in South Sinai, Egypt.
- On August 21, militants led by IS-affiliated terrorist Khaled al-Talawi killed two police officers and one civilian in the town of Kaftoun in northern Lebanon. The LAF apprehended and killed al-Talawi on September 13 near Tripoli. As a result, four LAF soldiers were killed during the operation.

=== November ===
- Between November 2–3, five were killed in Stadttempel, Vienna, including the perpetrator. The Vienna Police Department confirmed that the attacker was an Islamic State sympathizer, and that the attack was motivated by Islamic extremism.

=== December ===
- On 30 December, an assault targeted a convoy of Syrian regime soldiers and militiamen of Bashar al-Assad's elite Fourth Brigade returning from their posts in Deir Ez-Zor. The bus was ambushed in a well-planned operation near the village of Shula by jihadists who set up a false checkpoint to stop the convoy and detonated bombs before opening fire.
