= Emir Suljagić =

Bosnian journalist and politician

Director of the Srebrenica Genocide Memorial
- Incumbent
- Assumed office 15 October 2019
- Preceded by: Mersed Smajlović

Deputy Minister of Defense
- In office 31 March 2015 – 10 December 2015
- Minister: Marina Pendeš

Minister of Education of Sarajevo Canton
- In office 13 January 2011 – 29 February 2012
- Preceded by: Safet Kešo
- Succeeded by: Fahrudin Oručević

Personal details
- Born: 21 May 1975 (age 51) Ljubovija, SR Serbia, Yugoslavia
- Party: Civic Alliance (2016–present)
- Other political affiliations: Social Democratic Party (2007–2013); Democratic Front (2013–2015)
- Spouse: Aida Bjelopoljak
- Education: University of Sarajevo

Emir Suljagić (born 21 May 1975) is a Bosnian journalist and politician who is currently the Manager of the Srebrenica Genocide Memorial. He served as Minister of Education of Sarajevo Canton from 13 January 2011 until 29 February 2012 and was also Deputy minister of Defense from 31 March 2015 to 10 December 2015.

Suljagić is most known for his work in advocating for the rights of survivors of the Srebrenica genocide. His book, Postcards from the Grave, is the first account of the genocide to be published in English by a Bosnian survivor and has so far been translated into nine other languages.

== Early life and education ==
Emir Suljagić was born on 21 May 1975 in Ljubovija, SR Serbia, SFR Yugoslavia. During the Bosnian War, he was a refugee. Suljagić was 17 years old when his family fled the ethnic cleansing of the Drina valley in 1992 and took refuge in Srebrenica. He taught himself English and became an interpreter for the United Nations (UN) forces stationed in the town. It was thanks to his employment as a UN interpreter that Suljagić survived the mass execution of the men and boys of the enclave that followed the fall of the town.

After the war, Suljagić attended the University of Sarajevo, where he studied political science. He later obtained an MA in Democracy and Human Rights from the University of Sarajevo and the University of Bologna (2005) and a PhD in Political Science from the Institute for Peace Research and Security Studies at the University of Hamburg (2010).

== Political activism ==
In 2006, Suljagić was elected as an advisor to the Chairman of the Council of Ministers of Bosnia and Herzegovina, Adnan Terzić, where he designed and implemented the communication strategy for the office of the Prime Minister, supervised the PR staff and served as the key spokesman and media contact. Following this, from 2009 – 2011, Suljagić served as the Director of Communications of the Office of Mayor of Sarajevo where he successfully conducted negotiations between Office of the Mayor and Al Jazeera English on the sale of the city-owned frequency and launch of Al Jazeera Balkans based in Sarajevo. During 2010, Suljagić was the Head of Communications for the Social Democratic Party (SDP) of Bosnia and Herzegovina where he spearheaded the development of messaging and strategy for the SDP's winning campaign during the 2010 parliamentary and presidential elections, doubling the number of votes since 2006 and leading to the biggest election victory in the SDP's century-long history.

In the 2010 parliamentary and presidential elections, Suljagić won a ministry seat and became the Minister of Education in the Government of the Sarajevo Canton. During his active mandate (2011 – 2012), Suljagić was directly responsible for 10,000 employees of the Ministry and an annual budget of 120 million Euros. He introduced centralized financial management into the public pre-school system of Canton Sarajevo and pursued a new policy of inclusive education for Roma and children with disabilities. In addition to this, Suljagić was elected as the Deputy Defense Minister in the Council of Ministers in Bosnia and Herzegovina in 2015.

Between 2012 and 2014, Suljagić founded and coordinated two separate political initiatives, ''Vote for Srebrenica'' and the ''1 March Coalition''. The ''Vote for Srebrenica'' campaign successfully negotiated the candidacy of a joint candidate by four different pro-Bosnian parties for mayor in the 2012 local elections in Srebrenica, thus preserving the voice of the Bosniak minority in Srebrenica. The ''1 March Coalition'' is the largest post-war network of survivors, refugees, internally displaced persons, and civic organizations with the goal of voter registration in their pre-war places of residence.

In 2022, Suljagić voiced support for Ukraine in the Siege of Mariupol and drew comparisons with Bosnia's plight in the Bosnian War. In contrast, Suljagić attracted criticism for his refusal to comment on the Gaza war, where he argued that "this is not our battle" and that he will not use the work of the Srebrenica Genocide Memorial "at the altar of whatever Hamas's agenda is".

== Journalism and academic career ==
Suljagić's first journalistic role was as a reporter, investigative reporter, and editor in the leading Bosnian weekly news-magazine ''Dani“ where he covered a wide range of issues, from corruption to war-crimes. He received the ''Karim Zaimović Best Journalist under 25 Award '' in 1999. From 2002 – 2004, Suljagić reported from the International criminal tribunal for the former Yugoslavia (ICTY) in The Hague for the Institute for War and Peace Reporting (IWPR). He was the first journalist to publish evidence showing Slobodan Milošević’s regime directly participating in the Srebrenica genocide.

In 2010, Suljagić received the Dayton Literary Peace Prize.

Suljagić has given interviews and provided commentaries on a range of issues, including genocide denial, post-conflict recovery, and human rights, to many national and international media outlets including CNN, Al Jazeera, BBC, New York Times, Die Presse, Die Zeit, Suddeeutsche Zeitung, El Pais, TRT, Politico, FTV BiH, Federalni Radio, NTV Hayat, Face TV, TV1, HRT, and BIRN.

In 2017, he started teaching at the International University of Sarajevo and in 2019 served as the Dean of the Faculty of Business and Administration. Currently, he teaches genocide studies and security studies courses at the International University of Sarajevo as an adjunct professor.

In 2007, as a survivor, Suljagić joined the project ‘‘Personal stories of the Victims for the Permanent Exhibition of Memorial Room of Memorial Center Srebrenica-Potočari’’ and was actively engaged the work of the Memorial Center since then. Most recently, Suljagić was appointed the Director of the Srebrenica-Potočari Memorial Center.

== Personal life ==
After his marriage to Behija Selimović had ended some time in the early 2010s, Emir married Aida Bjelopoljak, a Kakanj-born Sarajevo gynecologist, in 2023. Their daughter was born in 2020.

== Publications ==
=== Refereed publications ===
==== Books ====
Emir Suljagić. Ethnic Cleansing: Politics, Policy, Violence - Serb Ethnic Cleansing Campaign in former Yugoslavia, Nomos Publishers, Berlin, 2010

==== Book chapters ====
Emir Suljagić. ''Justice squandered? The trial of Slobodan Milošević“ in Ellen E. Lutz and Caitlin Reiger (eds) Prosecuting Heads of State, Cambridge University Press, Cambridge, 2009

==== Articles ====
Emir Suljagić. “Premošćavanje jaza između države i društva: Krizni štab kao ključni mehanizam etničkog čišćenja”, Pregled, No. 1, Vol. LVII, 2017

Emir Suljagić. ''The Role of Croatia in Bosnia and Herzegovina: Antemurale Christianitatis as a Policy of Choice“, Insight Turkey, 2019 Spring, Vol. 21 / No. 2 / 2019

Emir Suljagić. „Logori i prakse u logorima kao sastavni dio strategije etničkog čišćenja: moralni napad na žrtve“, Pregled, No. 3, Vol. LIX, 2018

==== Policy Brief ====
Emir Suljagić, Reuf Bajrović and Richard Kraemer, ''Bosnia on the Russian Chopping Block: The Potential for Violence and Steps to Prevent it'', Foreign Policy Research Institute, Philadelphia, 2018

=== Non-refereed publications ===
==== Books ====
Emir Suljagić. Postcards from the Grave; Bosnian (DANI, Sarajevo, 2005), Croatian (Dureieux, Zagreb, 2005), English (Saqi Books, London, 2005), Dutch (Arbeiderspers, Amsterdam, 2006), Spanish (Gutenberg Galaxica Barcelona, 2007), Polish (Wydawnictwo Czarne, Warszawa, 2007), German (Czolnay, Vienna, 2009); Italian (Beit Casa Editrice, Trieste, 2010); Norwegian (Capellen Damm, 2010); Persian (Ketabestan, 2018)

Emir Suljagić. ''Samouk'', Sarajevo, Buybook, 2014

Emir Suljagić. ''Srebrenica MCMXCV'', Vrijeme, Zenica, 2017

==== Articles ====
Emir Suljagić. Srebrenica – Remembering the Future, Vaclav Havel, Madeleine Albright, Marieluise Beck, Chris Keulemans, Slavenka Drakulic und Susan Sontag, Heinrich-Böll-Stiftung, Sarajevo, 2005

Emir Suljagić. “Letter to a Serb friend”, in Srebrenica – from denial to recognition, Ed. Sonja Biserko, Helsinki Committee for Human Rights in Serbia, Belgrade, 2005

Emir Suljagić. ''The Line that Stretches from Srebrenica to Homs'', Transitions Online, 2 March 2012

Emir Suljagić. ''Bosnia: Heading Towards Institutional Gridlock?”, The Centre on Russia, Caucasus and Central Asia, Italian Institute for International Political Studies; 16 May 2018

Emir Suljagić. “Targeting ‘Turks’: How Karadzic Laid the Foundations for Genocide”, Balkan Insight, April 15, 2019

==== Newspaper Op/Eds ====
Emir Suljagić. ʺTruth at The Hagueʺ, New York Times, 1 June 2003

Emir Suljagić. ʺHolding Serbia accountableʺ, Boston Globe, 4 March 2007

Emir Suljagić. ʺBosnia and Herzegovina is Andalusia in the Makingʺ, Al Jazeera, 1 September 2018

Emir Suljagić. ʺNew Srebrenica 'investigation' will deny the reality of genocideʺ, Middle East Eye, 17 March 2019

==== Research reports ====
Emir Suljagić. Bosnia and Herzegovina: Key Obstacles to the Stabilization and Democratization, „Basic Instinct - The Case for More NATO In The Western Balkans“, Center For Euro-Atlantic Studies of Serbia, September 2017

Emir Suljagić. BOSNIA AND HERZEGOVINA: THE STATE OF FROZEN PEACE (Possibility of Renewal of Large-scale Violence in Short and Medium Term), June 2009 (Commissioned by the United Kingdom Department for International Development)
