= List of terrorist incidents in 2024 =

This is a list of terrorist incidents in 2024, including attacks by violent non-state actors for political motives. Note that terrorism related to drug wars and cartel violence is not included. Ongoing military conflicts are listed separately.

== Guidelines ==
- To be included, entries must be notable (have a stand-alone article) and described by a consensus of reliable sources as "terrorism".
- List entries must comply with the guidelines outlined in the manual of style under MOS:TERRORIST.
- Casualties figures in this list are the total casualties of the incident including immediate casualties and later casualties (such as people who succumbed to their wounds long after the attacks occurred).
- Casualties listed are the victims. Perpetrator casualties are listed separately (e.g. x (+y) indicate that x victims and y perpetrators were killed/injured).
- Casualty totals may be underestimated or unavailable due to a lack of information. A figure with a plus (+) sign indicates that at least that many people have died (e.g. 10+ indicates that at least 10 people have died) – the actual toll could be considerably higher. A figure with a plus (+) sign may also indicate that over that number of people are victims.
- If casualty figures are 20 or more, they will be shown in **bold**. In addition, figures for casualties more than 50 will also be **underlined**.
- Incidents are limited to one per location per day. If multiple attacks occur in the same place on the same day, they will be merged into a single incident.
- In addition to the guidelines above, the table also includes the following categories:

0 people were killed/injured by the incident.
1–19 people were killed/injured by the incident.
20–49 people were killed/injured by the incident.
50–99 people were killed/injured by the incident.
100+ people were killed/injured by the incident.

== List ==
Total incidents: 73

| Date | Type | Dead | Injured | Location | Article | Details | Perpetrator(s) | Part of | |
|---|---|---|---|---|---|---|---|---|---|
| 2 January | Stabbing, attempted assassination | 0 | 1 | Gadeokdo, South Korea | Attempted assassination of Lee Jae-myung | Democratic Party of Korea leader Lee Jae-myung was stabbed in the neck while visiting the construction site of an airport. The suspect was arrested on the scene. | Kim Jin-sung | 2024 South Korean legislative election | |
| 3 January | Suicide bombings | 103 (+2) | 284 | Kerman, Iran | 2024 Kerman bombings | A double suicide bombing occurred on the fourth anniversary of Qasem Soleimani's assassination during a commemorative ceremony. | Islamic State – Khorasan Province | Assassination and terrorism in Iran | |
| 7 January | Mass shooting, shootout | 3 | 1 (+2) | Wadi al-Haramiya, West Bank | Wadi al-Haramiya shooting | Two Palestinian gunmen opened fire at civilians, killing two people. Israeli police returned fire, shooting and injuring a police woman and the two suspects, and accidentally killing a young girl. | Two Palestinian gunmen | Israeli–Palestinian conflict | |
| 15 January | Vehicular attack, stabbing | 1 | 18 | Ra'anana, Israel | 2024 Ra'anana attack | Two Palestinians rammed a car into pedestrians in the city of Ra'anana, after they exited the car they also stabbed one person. | Hamas | Israeli–Palestinian conflict | |
| 27 January | Mass shooting | 9 | 3 | Saravan, Iran | 2024 Saravan killings | 12 Pakistani workers were shot by militant gunmen. Nine of the twelve who were shot, were killed. | Three unknown gunmen | Sistan and Baluchestan insurgency and 2024 Iran–Pakistan conflict | |
| 28 January | Shooting | 1 | 1 | Istanbul, Turkey | 2024 Istanbul church shooting | Two men started shooting in the Church of Santa Maria during Sunday Mass. The Islamic State claimed responsibility. | Islamic State | Turkey–Islamic State conflict | |
| 28 January | Drone attack | 3 | 47 | Rukban, Jordan | Tower 22 drone attack | A drone attack on U.S. military outpost Tower 22 killed 3 U.S. military personnel and wounded 47 others. | Ansar Allah al-Awfiya and Islamic Resistance in Iraq | Middle Eastern crisis (2023–present) | |
| 30 January | Bombing | 4 | 5 | Sibi, Pakistan | 2024 Sibi bombing | A bombing at a Pakistan Tehreek-e-Insaf political rally killed four people and injured five others. The Islamic State – Pakistan Province claimed responsibility. | Islamic State – Pakistan Province | Insurgency in Balochistan | |
| 6 February | Bombings | 10 | 20+ | Mogadishu, Somalia | 2024 Mogadishu market bombing | Four blasts went off in different areas of the crowded Bakaara Market. | Al-Shabaab (suspected) | Somali Civil War | |
| 6 February | Mass shooting | 1 (+2) | 7 | Istanbul, Turkey | 2024 Istanbul Palace of Justice shooting | Two suspects attacked a security checkpoint near the Istanbul Justice Palace before being killed in a shootout with police. | Revolutionary People's Liberation Party/Front | DHKP/C insurgency in Turkey | |
| 7 February | Bombings | 28–30+ | 40+ | Pishin District and Qilla Saifullah District, Pakistan | 2024 Balochistan bombings | Two bombings occurred at separate political offices in Balochistan province a day before the 2024 Pakistani general election. | Islamic State – Pakistan Province | Insurgency in Balochistan | |
| 9 February | Mass shooting | 25 | Unknown | Mucojo, Mozambique | 2024 Mucojo attack | Militants stormed a military position of the Mozambique Defence Armed Forces. | Islamic State – Mozambique Province | Insurgency in Cabo Delgado | |
| 16 February | Mass shooting | 2 (+1) | 4 | Kiryat Malakhi, Israel | 2024 Kiryat Malakhi attack | A Palestinian man shot at people waiting at a bus stop. The attacker was killed by a bystander. | Fadi Jamjoun | Israeli–Palestinian conflict | |
| 19-20 February | Mass shooting/stabbing | 24+ | Unknown | Beni Territory and Mambasa Territory, DRC | 2024 East Congo attacks | Allied Democratic Forces militants stormed towns in Beni and Mambasa territory killing 11 civilians in Beni and 13 in Mambasa. | Allied Democratic Forces | 2021–2024 Democratic Republic of the Congo attacks | |
| 25 February | Attack | 15 | 2 | Essakane, Burkina Faso | Essakane church massacre | Militants catholic churchgoers during a sunday mass. | Islamic State – Sahel Province | Islamist insurgency in Burkina Faso | |
| 28 February | Suicide car bombing, hostage taking | 30-32 | Several dozen | Kwala, Koulikoro Region, Mali | Kwala attack | A suicide car bomber blew himself up at the Malian military camp before 100+ militants raided it, taking weapons, ammunition and equipment. | Jama'at Nasr al-Islam wal-Muslimin | Mali War | |
| 29 February | Mass shooting | 2 (+3) | 0 | Eli, West Bank | 2024 Eli shooting | A Palestinian police officer shot at Israeli civilians at a gas station. The shooter and two other terrorists involved in the attack were killed. | Mohammad Manasrah | Middle Eastern crisis (2023–present) | |
| 1 March | Bombing | 0 | 9 | Bengaluru, India | 2024 Bengaluru cafe bombing | Two terrorist placed a bag containing a bomb inside the Rameshwaram Cafe in Bengaluru, India. | Islamic State | Terrorism in India | |
| 7 March | Kidnapping | 0 | 0 | Kuriga, Kaduna State, Nigeria | Kuriga kidnapping | More than 287 children and a teacher were kidnapped from their school in Kuriga by terrorists with guns on motorcycles. | Unknown terrorists | Nigerian bandit conflict | |
| 14 March | Suicide car bombing, siege | 8 (+6) | 27 | Mogadishu, Somalia | 2024 Mogadishu SYL Hotel attack and siege | An al-Shabaab suicide bomber drove a car loaded with explosives to the front of the SYL Hotel. After the explosion militants sieged the hotel. After more than 13 hours, the siege was ended by security forces. | Al-Shabaab | Somali Civil War | |
| 20 March | Bombings, shootout | 2 (+8) | 0 | Gwadar, Balochistan, Pakistan | 2024 Gwadar attack | Eight Majeed Brigade terrorists detonated bombs at the Gwadar Port Authority Complex before being killed in a shootout with Pakistani security forces. | Balochistan Liberation Army | Insurgency in Balochistan | |
| 21 March | Suicide bombing | 21 (+1) | 50 | Kandahar, Afghanistan | 2024 Kandahar New Kabul Bank bombing | An Islamic State suicide bomber, identified by IS as Mu’awiyah al-Panjshiri, blew himself up at a New Kabul Bank in the PD-1 area of the city of Kandahar, Southern Afghanistan, as Taliban members were withdrawing their salaries, killing 21 people and wounding 50 others. | Islamic State – Khorasan Province | Islamic State–Taliban conflict | |
| 21 March | Suicide bombings, ambush | 23-30 (+30) | 17 | Teguey, Niger | Teguey attack | Jihadist militants ambushed a convoy of the Nigerien Army, and then detonated their explosive vests killing and wounding multiple soldiers. | Islamist insurgency in Niger | | |
| 22 March | Mass shooting, bombing, arson | 151 | 609 | Krasnogorsk, Russia | Crocus City Hall attack | A mass shooting and multiple explosions occurred at the Crocus City Hall in Krasnogorsk, Moscow Oblast. A fire broke out during the attack. The Islamic State claimed responsibility. | Islamic State – Khorasan Province | Terrorism in Russia | |
| 26 March | Suicide bombing | 6 (+1) | 0 | Shangla District, Pakistan | 2024 Shangla bombing | A suicide bombing occurred when an explosive laden vehicle rammed itself into a bus carrying Chinese nationals who were being taken to the Dasu Dam. All 6 people in the bus and the attacker were killed. | Unknown | Anti-China terrorism in Pakistan and insurgency in Khyber Pakhtunkhwa | |
| 30 March | Car bombing | 8+ | 30+ | Azaz, Syria | 2024 Azaz bombing | A car bomb exploded at a crowded market. No group has claimed responsibility, but a militant from Ahrar al-Sham was arrested. | Ahrar al-Sham (suspected) | Syrian civil war | |
| 31 March | Mass shooting, assault, looting, ambush | 73+ | 2+ | Tawori, Burkina Faso | Tawori attack | Jihadist militants attacked multiple groups of Burkinabe soldiers in Tawori. The militants also attacked the village of Tawori and a nearby gold mine. | Jama'at Nusrat al-Islam wal-Muslimin | Islamist insurgency in Burkina Faso | |
| 12 April | Kidnapping, execution | 9 | 0 | Shangla District, Pakistan | Nushki incident | Armed attackers intercepted a bus from Quetta to Taftan and abducted nine passengers, which were later found shot dead. | Balochistan Liberation Army | Insurgency in Balochistan | |
| 12 April | Stabbing | 1 | 0 | Malachei HaShalom, West Bank | Killing of Benjamin Achimeir | 14-year-old Benjamin Achimeir was fatally stabbed by a Palestinian man. | Ahmed Dawabsha | Israeli–Palestinian conflict | |
| 12–13 April | Rioting, arson, assault, shooting | 4 | Dozens | West Bank, State of Palestine | April 2024 Israeli settler rampages | After the killing of Benjamin Achimeir, many Israeli settlers attacked Palestinian Arab areas of the West Bank. | Israeli settlers, Hilltop Youth | Anti-Palestinianism | |
| 15 April | Mass stabbing | 0 | 3 (+1) | Wakeley, Australia | 2024 Wakeley church stabbing | A 16-year-old boy stabbed three people at the Christ The Good Shepherd Church before being taken into custody. | 16-year-old boy, name unreleased | Terrorism in Australia | |
| 29 April | Mass shooting | 6 | 1 | Guzara, Herat Province, Afghanistan | 2024 Guzara Attack | An unknown man stormed into a Shia mosque shooting and killing 6 people and injuring 1. | Unknown man | Terrorism in Afghanistan | |
| 17 May | Stabbing, shooting | 2 (+1) | 1 | Ulu Tiram, Malaysia | 2024 Ulu Tiram police station attack | A man attacked the police station in Ulu Tiram to seize firearms for Jemaah Islamiyah. The attacker was shot and killed by the police. | Jemaah Islamiyah | Terrorism in Malaysia | |
| 17 May | 6 May | Firebombing | 3 | 8 | Buenos Aires, Argentina | 2024 Buenos Aires firebomb attack | A 62 years-old man attacked a boarding house with molotov bombs. The attack was found to have been motivated by homophobia. | Unidentified 62 years-old man | Terrorism in Argentina |
| Mass shooting | 7 | 7 | Bamyan, Afghanistan | 2024 Bamyan shooting | Gunmen opened fire on a vehicle carrying foreign tourists from Spain, Norway, Lithuania, and Australia, alongside their Afghan guides, in the city of Bamyan, Central Afghanistan. | Islamic State – Khorasan Province | Islamic State-Taliban conflict | | |
| 26 May | Suicide bombings, shooting | 5 (+31–100) | Several dozen | Mourdiah and Niamana, Mali | Mourdiah attack | Militants attacked a Malian Army base and a Wagner Group base, killing 5 people. | Jama'at Nasr al-Islam wal-Muslimin | Mali War | |
| 31 May | Stabbing | 1 | 5 (+1) | Mannheim, Germany | 2024 Mannheim stabbing | A man stabbed several people at a rally. A police officer who was injured in the attack died two days later. | Sulaiman Ataee | Islamic terrorism | |
| 5 June | Shooting | 0 | 1 (+1) | Beirut, Lebanon | 2024 Beirut US embassy shooting | An attacker shot at the US embassy in Beirut injuring a security guard before being shot and arrested. | Islamic State (suspected) | Middle Eastern crisis (2023–present) | |
| 8 June | Bombings, Car Bombings | 79+ (+60) | Unknown | El Dher District, Somalia | 2024 El Dher attack | Al-Shabaab militants attacked four military bases and overran the town of El Dher for several hours, killing 25-59+ people. 60+ militants were also killed. | Al-Shabaab | Somali Civil War | |
| 9 June | Ambush, mass shooting | 9 | 41 | Reasi district, India | 2024 Reasi attack | A group of gunmen ambushed a passenger bus carrying Hindu pilgrims, causing it to crash into a ravine. | Lashkar-e-Taiba (suspected) | Kashmir conflict | |
| 16 June | Hostage taking | 0 (+5) | 0 (+1) | Rostov-on-Don, Russia | Rostov-on-Don pre-trial detention center hostage crisis | Militants took people hostage before five of them were killed, and the sixth was injured and captured. No hostages were injured or died during the crisis. | Islamic State | Terrorism in Russia | |
| 23 June | Mass shooting, spree shooting, arson | 22 (+5) | 45 | Dagestan, Russia | 2024 Dagestan attacks | Two synagogues, two Eastern Orthodox churches, and a traffic police post were attacked simultaneously with automatic weapons and Molotov cocktails. | Islamic State | Terrorism in Russia | |
| 29 June | Crossbow attack | 0 (+1) | 1 | Belgrade, Serbia | 2024 attack on the Israeli embassy in Belgrade | An armed assailant attacked the Israeli embassy in Serbia and shot an officer in the neck who was guarding it before being fatally shot by police. | Salahudin Zujovic | Islamic terrorism in Europe | |
| 29 June | Bombings | 32 (+3) | 48 | Borno State, Nigeria | 2024 Gwoza bombings | At least three bomb blasts targeted several areas in Gwoza killing thirty-two people and injuring forty-eight others. | Islamic State – West Africa Province (suspected) | Terrorism in Nigeria | |
| 1 July | Slashing, mass shooting | ~40 | Unknown | Djiguibombo, Mali | Djiguibombo massacre | Around forty people were killed at a wedding ceremony by unknown militants. Some victims throats were slit, while others were shot. | Unidentified attackers | Mali War | |
| 13 July | Grenade explosions, shootout | 3 (+5) | 21 | Mogadishu, Somalia | 2024 Mogadishu prison attack | Al-Shabaab militants attacked soldiers and attempted to break out of jail by using grenades and firearms. Three soldiers and five militants were killed. | Al-Shabaab | Somali Civil War | |
| 14 July | Car bombing | 9 (+1) | 20 | Mogadishu, Somalia | Top Coffee bombing | A car bomb exploded in Boondheere, Mogadishu killing at least 9 and injuring another 20. | Al-Shabaab | Somali Civil War | |
| 15 July | Mass shooting | 6 (+3) | 30+ | Muscat, Oman | 2024 Muscat mosque shooting | A mass shooting occurred at a Shia mosque in Muscat, Oman. The Islamic State claimed responsibility. | Islamic State | Islamic terrorism | |
| 15 July | Bombing | 8 (+10) | 141+ | Bannu Cantonment, Khyber Pakhtunkhwa, Pakistan | Bannu Cantonment attack | 10 members of the Hafiz Gul Bahadur group of the Pakistani Taliban exploded a vehicle filled with explosives causing a wall to collapse, killing eight soldiers and injuring 141 others, including at least 7 civilians. All 10 militants were killed. | Hafiz Gul Bahadur Group | Insurgency in Khyber Pakhtunkhwa | |
| 27 July | Rocket attack | 12 | 42+ | Majdal Shams, Golan Heights | Majdal Shams attack | An explosive projectile struck a soccer field in Majdal Shams, killing twelve people and injuring at least 42 others. | Hezbollah (accused) | Israel–Hezbollah conflict (2023–present) | |
| 2 August | Suicide bombing, mass shooting, shootout | 50+ (+6) | 212+ | Mogadishu, Somalia | 2024 Lido Beach attack | A suicide bomber detonated an explosive on Lido Beach near the Beach View Hotel. After the bombing, Al-Shabaab militants stormed a hotel and started shooting and killing people. In total, at least 50 people died, including six attackers and a soldier. | Al-Shabaab | Somali Civil War | |
| 11 August | Bombing | 1 | 11+ | Kabul, Afghanistan | 2024 Kabul bus bombing | A bomb exploded on a bus in Kabul, killing one person and injuring at least eleven others. | Islamic State | Islamic State–Taliban conflict | |
| 17 August | Suicide bombing | 20+ (+1) | 10+ | Mogadishu, Somalia | 2024 Mogadishu tea shop bombing | An IED suicide bombing at a tea shop in Mogadishu killed at least twenty, and injured ten others. | Al-Shabaab | Somali Civil War | |
| 18 August | Suicide bombing | 0 (+1) | 1 | Tel Aviv, Israel | Lehi Street bombing | A suicide bomber detonated his backpack containing explosives, killing himself and injuring a bystander. | Hamas, Palestinian Islamic Jihad | Gaza war | |
| 23 August | Hostage taking, attempted bombing, mass stabbing | 9 (+4) | 2 | Surovikino, Russia | Surovikino penal colony hostage crisis | Four Islamic State attackers took at least four prison guards hostage. Thirteen people were killed, including five employees and all four attackers. Two others are injured. | Islamic State | Terrorism in Russia | |
| 25 August | Mass stabbing | 3 | 8 | Solingen, Germany | 2024 Solingen stabbing | An attacker stabbed multiple people at the 650th anniversary of Solingen festival, killing three people and injuring eight others. | Issa Al H. | Terrorism in Germany | |
| 25 August | Mass shooting | 600+ | 300+ | Barsalogho Department, Burkina Faso | 2024 Barsalogho massacre | Militants fired on civilians and soldiers digging defensive trenches around security outposts, killing at least 600 people and injuring at least 300 others. Several militants were also killed. | Jama'at Nasr al-Islam wal-Muslimin | Jihadist insurgency in Burkina Faso | |
| 26 August | Mass shootings, clashes, ambushes, suicide bombings, arsons | 74+ (+21) | Unknown | Balochistan, Pakistan | August 2024 Balochistan attacks | BLA attackers committed ambushes, arsons, clashes, shootings and suicide bombings in Balochistan, killing at least 74 people, including at least 14 soldiers (102 claimed by BLA, 14 claimed by Pakistan) and at least 60 civilians. At least 21 militants were also killed. | Balochistan Liberation Army | Insurgency in Balochistan | |
| 1 September | Mass shooting | 3 (+1) | 0 | Tarqumiyah, Palestine | 2024 Tarqumiyah shooting | Three Israeli police officers were shot in a drive-by shooting by a lone wolf gunman who was later killed when Israeli soldiers besieged his house in Hebron. | Khalil al-Rahman Brigade | Israeli–Palestinian conflict | |
| 2 September | Suicide bombing | 6 (+1) | 13 | Qala Bakhtiar neighbourhood, Kabul, Afghanistan | 2024 Qala Bakhtiar bombing | Six people including a woman were killed and thirteen others were injured when a suicide bomber detonated his explosives outside a government building in Qala Bakhtiar neighbourhood, Kabul, Afghanistan. The Islamic State claimed responsibility a day later, claiming that they killed at least 45 people but the claim is unconfirmed. | Islamic State | Islamic State–Taliban conflict | |
| 3 September | Massacre, mass shooting, arson, looting | 130+ | 30+ | Tarmuwa, Yobe State, Nigeria | Tarmuwa massacre | Over 50 armed Islamic State extremists carried out mass shootings in homes and markets, set ablaze and looted shops and houses and shot worshippers, killing at least 130 villagers, accused of collaborating with the Nigerian military. | Islamic State – West Africa Province | Boko Haram insurgency | |
| 5 September | Shooting | 0 (+1) | 0 | Munich, Germany | 2024 Munich shooting | An 18 year old Austrian resident, armed with an old repeating rifle with bayonet, opened fire on German Police at the Israeli Embassy in Munich. He was a supporter of the Syrian terrorist group Jabhat al-Nusra. | Emrah Ibrahimović | Islamic terrorism | |
| 8 September | Mass shooting | 3 (+1) | 0 | Allenby Bridge | 2024 Allenby Bridge shooting | A Jordanian truck driver opened fire on the Allenby Bridge at the border, killing three Israeli border guards. The gunman was fatally shot. | Maher Diab Hussein Al-Jazi | | |
| 12 September | Mass shooting | 15 | 6 | Between Ghor Province and Daykundi Province, Afghanistan | 2024 Afghanistan bus shooting | Four ISKP militants opened fire at a minibus in Afghanistan, killing fifteen people and injuring six others. | Islamic State – Khorasan Province | Afghan conflict | |
| 17 September | Gunfire, arson | 81-100+ | 255+ | Bamako, Mali | 2024 Bamako attacks | Armed men attacked several places in Bamako, killing at least 81 people and injuring 255 others. | Jama'at Nasr al-Islam wal-Muslimin | Mali War | |
| 1 October | Mass shooting, stabbing attack | 7 (+2) | 17 | Jaffa, Tel Aviv, Israel | 2024 Jaffa shooting | Two gunmen armed with knives and firearms attacked people at a light rail in Jaffa. The perpetrators fatally shot 7 people and injured 17 others before being fatally shot by police and armed civilians. | Hamas | Middle Eastern crisis (2023–present) | |
| 6 October | Mass shooting, stabbing attack | 1 (+1) | 13 | Beersheba, Israel | 2024 Beersheba bus station shooting | A lone gunman attacked people at a McDonald's at a bus station in Beersheba, killing a police officer and injuring 13 others. The attacker was fatally shot by police. | Ahmad Said Suliman al-Uqbi | Middle Eastern crisis (2023–present) | |
| 18 October | Shooting | 0 (+2) | 2 | Neot HaKikar, Israel | 2024 Neot HaKikar shooting | Two gunmen from Jordan opened fire on Israeli troops, lightly injuring two soldiers, before the gunmen were killed in a shootout. | Muslim Brotherhood | Gaza war | |
| 23 October | Mass shooting, bombings | 5 (+2) | 22 | Kahramankazan, Ankara, Turkey | 2024 Turkish Aerospace Industries headquarters attack | Two terrorists armed with automatic assault rifles and grenades killed five people and injured 22 others at the Turkish Aerospace Industries headquarters in Ankara. | Kurdistan Workers' Party | Terrorism in Turkey | |
| 27 October | Vehicle-ramming attack | 1 (+1) | 40 | Tel Aviv, Israel | 2024 Tel Aviv truck attack | A man rammed his truck into people at a bus stop near the Mossad headquarters in Tel Aviv. One person was killed and 40 others were injured. The perpetrator was shot dead by an armed civilian. | Rami Nasrallah Natour | Gaza war | |
| 9 November | Suicide Bombing | 31 (+1) | 62+ | Quetta, Pakistan | 2024 Quetta railway station bombing | A suicide bombing by a Balochistan Liberation Army member inside a railway station killed at least 32 people and injured 62 others. | Balochistan Liberation Army | Insurgency in Balochistan | |
| 13 November | Suicide bombing | 0 (+1) | 0 | Brasília, Brazil | 2024 Brasília attack | A suicide bombing by an attacker who exploded a device in front of the Supreme Federal Court Palace. Another bomb was detonated in his own car at the National Congress parking lot. | Francisco Wanderley Luiz | Terrorism in Brazil | |
| 21 November | Mass shooting, ambush | 54 | 86 | Kurram District, Pakistan | 2024 Kurram massacre | At least 4 gunmen opened fire on an over 200 vehicle convoy carrying Shiite Muslims. Initially targeting the police vehicles escorting the convoy, the gunmen soon turned to the passengers. | Islamic State – Pakistan Province (suspected) | Sectarian violence in Pakistan | |
