= List of Islamist terrorist attacks =

The "black flag of jihad" as used by jihadist militants since c. the late 1990s.

The following is an incomplete list of Islamist terrorist attacks.

== 1980s ==
Location	Date	Description	Deaths	Injuries
France	December 1985 – September 1986	1985–86 Paris attacks, a series of over a dozen bombings in Paris by the Iranian-sponsored Committee for Solidarity With Arab and Middle Eastern Political Prisoners.	13	225
Israel	July 7, 1989	Tel Aviv–Jerusalem bus 405 suicide attack in Kiryat Ye'arim, Jerusalem District, by a Palestinian Islamic Jihad militant.	16	27

== 1990s ==
Location	Date	Description	Deaths	Injuries
United States	February 26, 1993	World Trade Center bombing in New York City.	6	1,042
Tanzania	August 7, 1998	1998 United States embassy bombings in Dar es Salaam and Nairobi.	224	4,000+
Kenya	August 7, 1998	1998 United States embassy bombings in Dar es Salaam and Nairobi.	224	4,000+

== 2001–2010 ==
=== 2001 ===
Location	Date	Description	Deaths	Injuries
United States	September 11	A series of four coordinated terrorist attacks by al-Qaeda involving the hijacking and crashing of passenger jet airliners.	2,977	25,000+

=== 2002 ===
Location	Date	Description	Deaths	Injuries
Indonesia	October 12	2002 Bali bombings in the tourist district of Kuta on the island of Bali.	202	240

=== 2003 ===
Location	Date	Description	Deaths	Injuries
Saudi Arabia	May 12	Riyadh compound bombings – Al-Qaeda attackers drove three car bombs into residential compounds housing Westerners and others. Nine bombers and another 3 insurgents also died.	27	160

=== 2004 ===
Location	Date	Description	Deaths	Injuries
Spain	March 11	Madrid train bombings.	193	2,050

=== 2005 ===
Location	Date	Description	Deaths	Injuries
United Kingdom	July 7	7 July 2005 London bombings – Four suicide bombers attacked London Underground trains and a double decker bus during the morning rush hour.	52	~784
Egypt	July 23	2005 Sharm El Sheikh bombings – Bombing attacks through shopping and hotel areas in the Red Sea resort of Sharm el-Sheikh.	88	~150
Indonesia	October 29	2005 Tentena market bombings. Three attacks in crowded markets and a bus.	60	180+
Jordan	November 9	2005 Amman bombings. A series of coordinated suicide attacks on hotels in Amman. Four attackers including a husband and wife team were involved.	60	115+

=== 2006 ===
Location	Date	Description	Deaths	Injuries
Egypt	April 24	2006 Dahab bombings – Bomb attacks on the resort city of Dahab.	23	~ 80
India	July 11	2006 Mumbai train bombings: Seven bomb blasts over a period of 11 minutes on the Suburban Railway in Mumbai.	209	700+

=== 2008 ===
Location	Date	Description	Deaths	Injuries
India	May 13	Nine synchronized blasts in Jaipur, claimed by the Indian Mujahideen, suspected to be carried out by the Harkat-ul-Jihad al-Islami.	80	216
India	July 26	2008 Ahmedabad bombings	56	200+
India	November 26	A series of coordinated attacks on Mumbai. The Indian government blamed Pakistan-based militant group Lashkar-e-Taiba and stated that the attackers were citizens of Pakistan, which the Pakistani government first rejected but then accepted when given proof. One of the attackers, Ajmal Kasab, was caught alive.	166+	300+

=== 2009 ===
Location	Date	Description	Deaths	Injuries
Pakistan	March 3	A bus carrying Sri Lankan cricketers was fired upon by 12 gunmen, believed to be members of Lashkar-e-Jhangvi, near Gaddafi Stadium in Lahore. Six members of the Sri Lanka national cricket team were wounded and six Pakistani policemen and two civilians were killed.	8	9

=== 2010 ===
Location	Date	Description	Deaths	Injuries
Russia	March 29	Moscow Metro bombings. Caucasus Emirate claimed responsibility	40	102
Pakistan	May 28	2010 Ahmadiyya mosques massacre Tehrik-i-Taliban Pakistan claimed attacks on two mosques belonging to the Ahmadiyya Muslim Community	86	45+
Pakistan	July 1	July 2010 Lahore bombings, anti-Sufi attack.	42+	175+

== 2011–2020 ==
=== 2012 ===
Location	Date	Description	Deaths	Injuries
France	March 11 – 22	Toulouse and Montauban shootings – Mohammed Merah, a French citizen of Algerian extraction, attacked French soldiers and later children and a teacher from a Jewish school in Montauban and Toulouse.	7	5
Russia	May 3	Makhachkala attack carried out by the Caucasus Emirate.	14	130

=== 2013 ===
Location	Date	Description	Deaths	Injuries
United States	April 15	Boston Marathon bombing – Two brothers, Tamerlan and Dzhokhar Tsarnaev, planted two bombs near the finish line of the Boston Marathon in Massachusetts.	3	183
United Kingdom	May 22	Murder of Lee Rigby in Woolwich, London	1	0
Kenya	September 21	Westgate shopping mall attack in Nairobi	67	175

=== 2014 ===
Location	Date	Description	Deaths	Injuries
Nigeria	February 14	Borno Massacre	200+	
Iraq	June 10	Badush prison massacre. The Islamic State of Iraq and the Levant (ISIL) killed at least 670 Shia prisoners in an attack on the Badush prison. ISIL first separated the Sunni inmates before executing the remaining prisoners.	670	
Iraq	August	Genocide of Yazidis by the Islamic State. An estimated 7,000 women and girls were also forced into sex slavery, according to the United Nations.	5,000	4,200–10,800
Russia	October 5	2014 Grozny bombing	6	12
Canada	October 22	2014 shootings at Parliament Hill, Ottawa. Lone attacker shot a soldier at a war memorial and attacked Parliament.	1	3
United States	October 23	2014 Queens hatchet attack. Zale H. Thomson, also known as Zaim Farouq Abdul-Malik, attacked four New York City policemen in the subway with a hatchet, severely injuring one in the back of the head and injuring another in the arm before being shot to death by the remaining officers. A civilian bystander was also shot.	0	5
Nigeria	November 28	Kano bombing	120	260
Russia	December 4	2014 Grozny clashes	26	
Australia	December 15–16	Lindt Cafe siege. A lone gunman, Man Haron Monis, held hostage 18 customers and employees of a Lindt Café in Martin Place, Sydney, Australia for 16-hours. A police Tactical Operations Unit stormed the café when a hostage was killed by Monis, who was shot dead by the police. Another hostage was killed by a ricochet from a police firearm.	3	4
Pakistan	December 16	2014 Peshawar school massacre	140	
Yemen	December 16	2014 Radda bombings. Two suicide car bombers rammed their vehicles into a Shiite rebel checkpoint.	26	
Nigeria	December 18	2014 Gumsuri kidnappings. Boko Haram insurgents also kidnapped at least 185 women and children.	32	
France	December 20	2014 Tours police station stabbing. A man yelling Allahu Akbar attacked a police office with a knife. He was killed and three police officers were injured.	1	3

=== 2015 ===
Location	Date	Description	Deaths	Injuries
France	January 7	Two brothers, Saïd and Chérif Kouachi, forced their way into the offices of the French satirical weekly newspaper Charlie Hebdo in Paris and opened fire.	12	11
Nigeria	January 8	Boko Haram attacked the town of Baga. Another 2,000 were missing.	200+	–
Denmark	February 14–15	2015 Copenhagen shootings. A gunman opened fire at the Krudttoenden café and later at the Great Synagogue in Copenhagen.	2	5
Tunisia	March 18	Bardo National Museum attack. Militants linked to ISIL attacked the Bardo National Museum with guns.	21	50+
Yemen	March 20	2015 Sana'a mosque bombings. Bombings on several Shia mosques by ISIL.	142	351
Libya	March 25	ISIL affiliates, the Shura Council of Benghazi Revolutionaries carried out suicide bombings in Benghazi.	12	25
Kenya	April 2	Garissa University College attack by Al-Shabaab.	148	79
Iraq	April 17	A series of bombings by ISIL in Baghdad.	40+	59+
Iraq	April 17	A car bomb exploded at the entrance of the US consulate in Erbil. ISIL took credit for the attack.	3	5
Afghanistan	April 18	A suicide bomb detonated in front of a bank in Jalalabad. ISIL claimed responsibility.	33	100+
Somalia	April 20	A minivan of UN workers was bombed by Al-Shabaab in the Puntland region.	9	4
Iraq	May 3	Two car bombs were detonated ten minutes apart in Baghdad. ISIL claimed responsibility for the attacks.	19	
United States	May 3	Two gunmen attacked the Curtis Culwell Center during a 'Draw Muhammad' cartoon art exhibit in Garland, Texas.	2	1
Afghanistan	May 4	A government bus was attacked by a suicide bomber in Kabul.	1	15
Iraq	May 10	Two car bombs were detonated ten minutes apart in Baghdad and the surrounding towns of Taji and Tarmiyah. ISIL claimed responsibility.	14	30
Afghanistan	May 10	A bus carrying government employees was attacked in Kabul by a suicide bomber. The Taliban claimed responsibility.	3	10
Pakistan	May 13	A bus carrying Shia Muslims was attacked by six armed gunman who rode up in motorcycles. Several Islamist groups claimed responsibility.	45	13
Afghanistan	May 14	A hotel hosting a cultural event was attacked by Taliban fighters in Kabul leaving 14 dead including an American, an Italian, and 4 Indians.	14	
Afghanistan	May 19	A suicide car bombing detonated in the parking lot of a Justice Ministry building in the diplomatic section of Kabul.	4	42
Saudi Arabia	May 22	A suicide bomber attacked a Shia mosque during prayer in al-Qadeeh village. ISIL claimed responsibility.	21	90+
Iraq	May 28	Two car bombs were set off minutes apart targeting the Cristal Grand Ishtar Hotel and the Babylon.	10	30
Saudi Arabia	May 29	A suicide bomber attacked a Shia mosque in Dammam, detonating the bomb in the parking lot.	4	
Turkey	June 5	2015 Diyarbakır rally bombings – Twin bombing of a Peoples' Democratic Party (HDP) rally.	4	100+
France	June 26	Saint-Quentin-Fallavier attack – A beheading in a factory near Lyon, with the head marked with Arabic writing and Islamist flags. Gas canisters set off a fire.	1	11
Tunisia	June 26	2015 Sousse attacks – A gunman named Seifeddine Rezgui attacked a hotel targeting European tourists staying there.	38	39
Nigeria	June 26–30	Boko Haram killed attacked and bombed villages, mosques, and other public spaces.	200	
Nigeria	July 7	A bomb exploded in a government office in Zaria.	20	
Cameroon	July 13	Two suicide bombers exploded in a bar in Fotokol and killed 13 people, including a soldier from Chad who was killed in the second explosion.	15	
Nigeria	July 17	Two towns were attacked by two suicide bombers.	62	
Turkey	July 20	2015 Suruç bombing in Kurdish majority city of Suruç. ISIL claimed responsibility.	33	104
Nigeria	July 22	A series of explosions at two bus stations in Gombe.	40	
Cameroon	July 26	A suicide bomber detonated at a popular nightclub in Maroua.	15	
India	July 27	2015 Gurdaspur attack Three Islamic terrorists of Pakistani origin from Indian-administrated Kashmir disguised in army uniforms attacked the Dina Nagar police station in Gurdaspur District of Punjab. The attack killed 3 policemen, 4 civilians and 15 others were injured. All 3 attackers were killed by security forces.	10	15
Nigeria	August 11	Explosions at a crowded market in Sabon Gari.	47	
Iraq	August 13	August 2015 Baghdad bombing. A truck bomb in a market.	70+	200
France	August 21	2015 Thalys train attack. Shooting and stabbing in train traveling from Amsterdam to Paris. The incident was believed by French police to be an Islamist terrorist attack.	0	5
Nigeria	August 28–30	Boko Haram members attacked three villages. 68 alone were killed in the village of Baanu.	79	
Nigeria	September 10	Explosion at a refugee camp for people fleeing Boko Haram.	2	
Iraq	September 17	Two suicide bombings in Baghdad. ISIL claimed responsibility.	12	55
Nigeria	September 21	Multiple explosions.	54	
Yemen	September 24	A bomb attack on a Shia mosque in Sana'a during prayers for the Muslim holiday of Eid al-Adha. Claimed by ISIL.	25	
Bangladesh	September 29	Three men on a motorbike shot and killed an Italian aid worker. The attack was claimed by ISIL.	1	
Nigeria	October 1	Multiple suicide bombings by Boko Haram.	14	39
Israel	October 1	Gunmen opened fire on a car near Nablus on the northern West Bank, killing a man and woman. Four of their children were also in the car and witnessed the attack, but were uninjured. The attackers were praised by Hamas.	2	
Australia	October 2	2015 Parramatta shooting. A NSW Police Force civilian employee was shot dead outside NSW Police Force headquarters on Charles Street, Parramatta, Sydney by a 15-year-old lone gunman. The gunman then engaged with NSW Police Special Constables in a shootout before being killed.	2	
Bangladesh	October 3	A Japanese man was shot and killed. The attack was claimed by ISIL.	1	
Iraq	October 3	Two suicide bombings in Shiite majority neighbourhoods in Baghdad. Attack claimed by ISIL.	20	61
Afghanistan	October 5	Two suicide bombings in Kabul targeted an intelligence centre. Claimed by the Taliban.	2	3
Somalia	October 7	Al-Shabaab militants ambushed and killed the nephew of Somali president Hassan Sheikh Mohamud.	2	
Turkey	October 10	2015 Ankara bombings. ISIL is suspected.	109	500+
Chad	October 10	Multiple suicide bombings blamed on Boko Haram.	33	51
Nigeria	October 22	Boko Haram attack in Borno State.	20	
Nigeria	October 23	Two separate mosques were attacked by suicide bombers.	42	
Niger	October 28	Boko Haram militants attacked a village, allegedly burning down houses and cars during the rampage.	13	
Egypt	October 31	Bomb on board a Russian jet brought it down in the Sinai peninsula.	224	
Lebanon	November 12	Twin suicide bombings in Beirut.	42	
France	November 13	A series of terrorist attacks in Paris involving a series of coordinated attacks which consisted of mass shootings and suicide bombings. This incident was the deadliest event on French soil since World War II.	137	416
Iraq	November 13	Suicide attack at a Shia funeral.	21	
Philippines	November 17	A Malaysian national was beheaded by Abu Sayyaf.	1	
Nigeria	November 17	A suicide attack at a market in Yola blamed on Boko Haram.	30+	80+
Bosnia and Herzegovina	November 18	A lone wolf Islamist killed two soldiers and injured civilians in Sarajevo.	3	5
Nigeria	November 18	Two explosions blamed on Boko Haram struck a phone market in Kano.	15	100+
Iraq	November 20	A suicide bomber detonated inside a Shiite mosque.	11	5
Cameroon	November 21	Suicide bombing blamed on Boko Haram.	10	
Nigeria	November 22	Suicide bombing.	8	
Tunisia	November 24	2015 Tunis bombing. ISIL claimed responsibility for an attack on a bus transporting members of the Presidential Guard.	14	11
Egypt	November 24	November 2015 Sinai attack. A day after the second round of parliamentary elections closed, militants attacked a hotel housing election judges in the provincial capital of al-Arish in North Sinai.	7	10+
Niger	November 25	Boko Haram attacked a village, shot residents and fired rockets.	18	
Nigeria	November 27	Boko Haram suicide attack on a Shia procession.	22	
Egypt	November 28	Islamist gunmen killed four security personnel in an attack at a police checkpoint in Saqqara.	4	
Mali	November 28	Militants fired rockets on a MINUSMA peacekeeping forces base. Ansar Dine claimed responsibility.	3	20
United States	December 2	In the 2015 San Bernardino attack, married couple Rizwan Farook and Tashfeen Malik opened fire in an office.	14	22
Chad	December 5	Four female suicide bombers from Boko Haram attacked the island of Koulfoua on Lake Chad.	19	130+
Yemen	December 6	The governor of Aden, Jaafar Mohammed Saad, was killed in a car bomb attack claimed by ISIL.	1	
Afghanistan	December 8	In the 2015 Kandahar Airport attacks several Taliban members attacked Kandahar Airport and surrounding areas.	70+	35
Iraq	December 9	A suicide bomber detonated in the doorway of a Shiite mosque.	11+	20
Afghanistan	December 11	In the 2015 Spanish Embassy attack in Kabul, Taliban militants detonated a car bomb and stormed a guesthouse near the embassy.	6	
Syria	December 11	Tell Tamer bombings. Three truck bombs set off by ISIL in Tell Tamer.	60	80
Iraq	December 12	A militant detonated his explosives in a truck at an Iraqi position near the Saudi border.	6	14
Syria	December 12	Islamists detonated a car bomb near an hospital in central Homs. 16 killed.	16	0
Nigeria	December 13	Boko Haram attacked the villages of Warwara, Mangari, and Bura-Shika.	30	20
Afghanistan	December 21	A suicide bomber on a motorcycle detonated near Bagram Airfield.	7	3
Nigeria	December 26	Boko Haram gunmen raided Kimba village, opening fire on residents and torching their homes.	14+	
Afghanistan	December 28	A Taliban suicide bomber detonated on a road near a school close to Kabul International Airport.	2	33
Nigeria	December 28	Fourteen Islamist female suicide bombers aged 12–18 attempted to simultaneously attack Maiduguri. Seven of the bombers were shot dead by security forces while three managed to escape and detonate themselves in Baderi and near a mosque, killing 26 people and wounding another 85.	36	85
Pakistan	December 29	A suicide bomber detonated in the entrance of an office of the National Database and Registration Authority in Mardan.	27	50+
Russia	December 29	A gunman opened fire on a group of residents who were visiting a viewing platform at the fortress in Derbent, Dagestan. ISIL claimed responsibility.	1	11

=== 2016 ===
Location	Date	Description	Deaths	Injuries
Afghanistan	January 1	A Taliban suicide bomber detonated himself in a French restaurant in Kabul.	2	15
India	January 2	In the 2016 Pathankot attack suspected Jaish-e-Mohammed militants attacked an air base killing 7 security force members.	7	
Libya	January 7	In the Zliten truck bombing, Islamist militants detonated a truck bomb at the al-Jahfal police training camp in Zliten.	50+	100+
France	January 7	In the January 2016 Paris police station attack an Islamist from Morocco wearing a fake explosive belt attacked police officers with a meat cleaver. He was shot dead.	1	0
Libya	January 7	Car bombing at a checkpoint in the oil port of Ras Lanuf.	7	11
Egypt	January 8	In the 2016 Hurghada attack two militants armed with a melee weapon and a signal flare stormed the Bella Vista Hotel.	0	3
France	January 11	A 15-year-old Turkish ISIL supporter attacked a teacher from a Jewish school in Marseille with a machete.	0	1
Iraq	January 11	ISIL gunmen detonated suicide vests in a shopping mall.	20	40+
Turkey	January 12	In the 2016 Istanbul bombing an ISIL suicide bomber detonated in the historical centre of Istanbul.	11	15
Indonesia	January 14	2016 Jakarta attacks which were orchestrated by ISIL.	2	24
Burkina Faso	January 15	In the 2016 Ouagadougou attacks Islamist gunmen armed with heavy weapons attacked the Cappuccino restaurant and the Splendid Hotel in Ouagadougou.	20+	15+
Pakistan	January 21	Bacha Khan University attack. The Taliban claimed responsibility for the attack.	22	
Somalia	January 22	Al-Shabab attack on beachside restaurant.	20	
Cameroon	January 25	Suspected Boko Haram insurgents blew themselves up in a market.	25	62
Nigeria	January 30	Boko Haram gunmen raided a village.	65	136
Uruguay	March 10	A 35-year-old man called Carlos Omar Peralta López from Paysandú repeatedly stabbed to death a Jewish merchant while screaming "Allah is great!" some months after his supposed conversion to Islam and assuming the identity of "Abdullah Omar". The victim's son was injured while trying to stop the attack.	1	1
Ivory Coast	March 13	In the 2016 Grand-Bassam shootings, Al-Qaeda gunmen stormed 3 hotels in Grand-Bassam.	18	
Turkey	March 19	March 2016 Istanbul bombing; carried out by an ISIL member	5	36
Iraq	March 20	In Anbar, ISIL suicide bombers attacked a municipal building	24	
Belgium	March 22	2016 Brussels bombings. Two suicide bombings in Brussels Airport and one bombing in the Brussels Metro.	35	300+
Yemen	March 25	Three ISIL suicide bombers struck security checkpoints in Aden.	29	
Iraq	March 25	A suicide bomber blew himself up at a football stadium in Iskandariya, south of Baghdad. ISIL claimed responsibility for the attack.	30	95
Pakistan	March 27	The 2016 Lahore suicide bombing targeted Christians who had gathered on Easter in Gulshan-e-Iqbal Park. The blast was orchestrated by Jamaat-ul-Ahrar, a Pakistani Taliban faction.	70	300
Afghanistan	April 19	The April 2016 Kabul attack targeted a security team responsible for protecting government VIPs in Kabul. It was the Taliban's biggest attack on an urban area since 2001.	64	347
Bangladesh	April 23	Attackers hacked a university professor to death in Rajshahi. ISIL claimed responsibility for the attack stating that they assassinated him "for calling to atheism".	1	
Bangladesh	April 25	Two gay rights activists were hacked to death in Dhaka. An Al-Qaeda affiliated group claimed responsibility for the attacks.	2	
Iraq	May 11	Car bomb attack on a market in Baghdad. ISIL claimed responsibility.	40	60
United States	June 12	Mass shooting at a nightclub in Orlando, Florida. The shooter, Omar Mateen, pledged allegiance to ISIL by specifically calling police and journalists several times during the incident.	49	53
France	June 14	A police officer and his wife were stabbed to death in Magnanville by a man swearing his allegiance to ISIL.	2	
Jordan	June 21	An ISIS militant attacked a refugee camp at an army post near Rukban. ISIL later claimed responsibility.	6	14
Pakistan	June 22	Assassination of Amjad Sabri, claimed by a splinter group of the Pakistani Taliban who accused him of blasphemy.	1	
Turkey	June 28	A simultaneous terrorist attack, consisting of shootings and suicide bombings at the international terminal of Terminal 2 of Istanbul Atatürk Airport.	45	230
Bangladesh	July 1	Gunmen killed 20 hostages in the affluent Gulshan Thana neighborhood of Dhaka. Thirteen hostages were rescued; two police officers and six attackers were killed. One attacker was taken into custody. ISIL claimed responsibility, but according to Bangladeshi officials, the attack was carried out by homegrown militant group Jamaat-ul-Mujahideen Bangladesh. On August 27, Bangladeshi police killed three militants whom they accused of perpetrating the Dhaka attack, including Tamim Ahmed Chowdhury, a 30-year-old Canadian citizen born in Bangladesh, who was described as "one of the main suppliers of funds and arms for several recent attacks".	26	
Iraq	July 3	July 2016 Baghdad bombings Two coordinated bomb attacks.	341+	246
Indonesia	July 4	A suicide bomber attacked a police station in Central Java, killing himself and injuring a police officer.	1	1
Iraq	July 7	A coordinated attack involving suicide car bombers, suicide bombers on foot, and gunmen against the mausoleum of Muhammad ibn Ali al-Hadi, a Shi'ite holy site in Baghdad. ISIL claimed responsibility.	56	75
France	July 14	2016 Nice truck attack.	87	450+
Germany	July 18	A 17-year-old Afghan refugee went on a stabbing spree inside a train near Würzburg. The attacker was shot dead when he attacked the arriving police officers.	1	5
Germany	July 24	A suicide bombing outside a wine bar in Ansbach, in which a bomber tried to bomb a large music festival going on at the time. Many videos were discovered of him pledging allegiance to ISIL and Abu Bakr al-Baghdadi. The bomber was the only fatality.	1	15
France	July 26	A priest's throat was slit and four nuns were taken hostage in a church in Rouen. ISIL claimed responsibility for the attack. The two attackers were shot dead by authorities. One of the men was known to the French intelligence services and was on the French government's terror watch-list.	3	
Pakistan	August 8	77 people were killed and over 100 injured by a suicide bombing at a government hospital in Quetta.	77	100+
United States	September 17–19	2016 New York and New Jersey bombings – three bombs exploded and several unexploded ones were found in the New York metropolitan area. The perpetrator was subsequently charged with attempting to radicalize fellow jail inmates to espouse violent jihadist beliefs.	0	31
Pakistan	November 12	Bombing at the Shah Noorani shrine in Balochistan. More people were killed and injured during the stampede that resulted from people fleeing the blast. ISIL claimed responsibility.	56	102
United States	November 28	Ohio State University attack. Car ramming attack and mass stabbing at Ohio State University. The perpetrator, Abdul Razak Ali Artan, was a Muslim Somali refugee and legal permanent resident of the United States.	0	11
Egypt	December 11	A suicide bomber killed 27 people and injured 47 others at St. Peter and St. Paul's Church (commonly known as El-Botroseya Church) in Cairo. ISIL claimed responsibility.	29	47
Germany	December 19	2016 Berlin truck attack during which a truck was driven into the Christmas market next to the Kaiser Wilhelm Memorial Church at Breitscheidplatz in Berlin.	12	56

=== 2017 ===
Location	Date	Description	Deaths	Injuries
Turkey	January 1	An ISIL gunman opened fire on a crowd of people in the Reina Nightclub in Istanbul.	39	70
Iraq	January 2	A suicide bomber with a truck full of explosives attacked a predominantly Shia market in Baghdad. ISIL took responsibility for the attack.	36	52
Afghanistan	February 8	ISIL militants attacked a convoy of aid workers of the Red Cross.	6	0
Afghanistan	February 11	Taliban suicide car bomber killed seven people outside a bank in Lashkargah.	7	21
Pakistan	February 16	During the Sehwan suicide bombing a suicide bomber entered the main hall of the Shrine of Lal Shahbaz Qalandar in Sehwan and detonated his payload amid dozens of worshippers.	91+	300+
Iraq	February 19	Two suicide bombings that hit districts recently retaken from ISIL in eastern Mosul. The first attack targeted an army checkpoint, killing three soldiers, and the second a gathering of civilians in the commercial district known as "My Fair Lady," killing two.	5	0
Pakistan	February 21	Three militants threw hand grenades and opened fire as they launched an assault in Tangi, near the border with Afghanistan. Two of the men blew themselves up during the 20-minute gun battle with security forces at the gate, while the third was shot dead by police before he could detonate his explosive vest.	7	22
Egypt	February 22	Two Coptic Christians were found killed in Al-Arish. The two were believed to have been kidnapped by militants from the ISIL-affiliated group "Sinai Province."	2	0
Afghanistan	March 8	Gunmen dressed as medics attacked a military hospital in Kabul in an assault claimed by ISIL.	40+	50+
Iraq	March 8	Two suicide bombers blew themselves up at a wedding party in Hajaj, near Tikrit. ISIL claimed responsibility.	26	67
United Kingdom	March 22	A man drove a car into pedestrians on the south side of Westminster Bridge.	6	49
Russia	April 3	A suicide bomber blew himself up on the St. Petersburg metro. The bomber was born in Kyrgyzstan and had ties to radical Islamists.	5	15
Sweden	April 7	2017 Stockholm truck attack – A rejected Uzbek asylum seeker stole a beer truck and drove onto a crowded high street to mow down as many pedestrians as possible. According to his testimony he wanted to pressure Sweden into ending its support for the fight against ISIL.	5	15
Egypt	April 9	Palm Sunday church bombings on Christian churches in Tanta and Alexandria.	47	100+
France	April 20	Three police officers and a bystander were shot by an attacker wielding an AK-47 rifle on the Champs-Élysées in Paris. The attacker was shot dead. He had a note defending ISIL, and had previously attempted to communicate with its fighters in Iraq and Syria.	2	3
United Kingdom	May 22	The Manchester Arena bombing – an Islamist extremist suicide bomber detonated a shrapnel-laden homemade bomb as people were leaving the Manchester Arena following a concert by American singer Ariana Grande.	22	1,017 (112 hospitalised)
Egypt	May 26	A gunman opened fire on a convoy carrying Coptic Christians traveling from Maghagha in Minya Governorate.	28	22
United Kingdom	June 3	The 2017 London Bridge attack was an incident where an attacker ran over multiple pedestrians on London Bridge. On Borough Market the occupants of the van stabbed multiple people before being shot by police.	11	48
France	June 6	2017 Notre Dame attack – A lone wolf carrying knives in his rucksack used a hammer to attack an officer guarding Notre-Dame de Paris. A video pledging allegiance to ISIL was later found.	0	2
Iran	June 7	2017 Tehran attacks – In the first attacks orchestrated by ISIL in Iran, Tehran was targeted by suicide bombers and teams of gunmen when they stormed Iran's parliament and the nearby shrine of Ruhollah Khomeini. All 4 attackers at the parliament were killed.	22	43
Iraq	June 9	Suicide bombing in Karbala. The attack was claimed by ISIL.	30	36
India	July 11	2017 Amarnath Yatra massacre – 8 Hindu civilian pilgrims were killed in an Islamist terror attack.		
Egypt	July 14	2017 Hurghada attack – An attacker with a knife stabbed foreign tourists.	2	4
Pakistan	August 7	A truck carrying explosive material accidentally went off at Band Road in Lahore. A few hours after the attack, a clash erupted between 7 militants and the CTD team in which 4 militants were shot dead while 3 others managed to escape. The militants were identified as from the Pakistani Taliban.	2	35
Spain	August 17–18	2017 Barcelona attacks – Three separate attacks in Barcelona.	15	120
Finland	August 18	2017 Turku attack – Stabbing attack in Turku by an eighteen-year-old Moroccan asylum seeker named Abderrahman Bouanane. According to the police he was a radicalized lone wolf influenced by ISIS. The attacker was shot in the leg by police and was arrested. Police later discovered that the attacker had also planned attacks at different sites. Three other suspects, all Moroccans, were remanded in custody in connection with the attack. He was convicted for terrorism and murder. It was the first time a Finnish court has decreed that a crime was a terrorist act. Finland's prime minister described the stabbings as the country's first terrorist attack in history.	2	8
United Kingdom	September 15	A bomb wrapped in a plastic grocery bag concealed in a bucket exploded at the height of the morning rush at the London Underground. ISIL claimed responsibility for the bombing.	0	29
United States	October 31	2017 New York City truck attack – A man drove a pickup truck into cyclists and runners along about 1 mile (2 km) of a bicycle path in Lower Manhattan, New York City. After leaving the vehicle, the driver wielded two guns (later found to be a paintball gun and a pellet gun); he was shot in the abdomen by police and arrested. An ISIL flag and a document that read either "It will endure." or "Islamic State will endure forever." in Arabic were found in the truck.	8	12
Egypt	December 29	A gunman opened fire outside a church in Cairo before attempting to storm the building, at least seven people were killed. He had earlier shot at a store, killing two people inside. The Interior Ministry said that the shop was owned by a Copt and that the two dead were Christian men. ISIL claimed responsibility for the attacks.	at least 9	0

=== 2018 ===
Location	Date	Description	Deaths	Injuries
Iraq	January 15	2018 Baghdad bombings.	38	105
Afghanistan	January 20	2018 Inter-Continental Hotel Kabul attack.	40	22
Afghanistan	January 24	Save the Children Jalalabad attack	6	27
Afghanistan	January 27	Kabul ambulance bombing.	103	235
Russia	February 18	Kizlyar church shooting	6	5
Somalia	February 18	February 2018 Mogadishu attack.	45	36
Burkina Faso	March 2	2018 Ouagadougou attacks	30	85
Afghanistan	March 21	March 2018 Kabul suicide bombing	33	65
France	March 23	Carcassonne and Trèbes attack – Hostage crisis	5	15
Somalia	April 1	2018 African Union base attack in Bulo Marer.	59 (+30)	Unknown
Afghanistan	April 22	22 April 2018 Kabul suicide bombing	69	120
Afghanistan	April 30	30 April 2018 Kabul suicide bombings	29	50
Nigeria	May 1	2018 Mubi suicide bombings	86	58
Libya	May 2	2018 attack on the Libyan High National Elections Commission	16	20
Netherlands	May 5	Stabbing attack in The Hague.	0	3
France	May 12	2018 Paris knife attack	2	4
Indonesia	May 13	2018 Surabaya bombings	25	55
Belgium	May 29	2018 Liège attack	4	4
Afghanistan	July 1	July 2018 Jalalabad suicide bombing	20	20
Pakistan	July 10	2018 Peshawar suicide bombing	22	75
Pakistan	July 13	2018 Mastung and Bannu bombings	154	223
Syria	July 25	2018 As-Suwayda attacks – A string of suicide bombings and gun attacks that took place in and around As-Suwayda. The attacks were committed by ISIL.	258 (+63 attackers)	180
Tajikistan	July 29	Terrorist attack against cyclists in Tajikistan – Assailants rammed American and European cyclists with a car in the Khatlon region, then attacked them with knives and an axe.	4	2
Jordan	August 12	An explosion near a police van in Fuheis. Officials claimed that the attackers supported ISIL, but did not have links to the organisation.	5	26+
Netherlands	August 31	2018 Amsterdam stabbing attack – A 19-year-old Afghans with a German residence permit, stabbed two American tourists with a knife at Amsterdam Centraal station. After the attack he was shot by police in his lower body and arrested.	0	2
Iran	September 22	2018 Ahvaz military parade attack – Militants wearing khaki uniforms shot at a military parade in Ahvaz. ISIL claimed the attack.	24+	20
Egypt	November 2	Islamic militants ambushed three buses carrying Christian pilgrims returning from a remote Coptic Christian monastery and opened fire. ISIL claimed responsibility.	7	19
Australia	November 9	2018 Melbourne stabbing attack – A man of Somali origin set a car on fire and stabbed multiple people in Melbourne. He was shot dead after confronting officers on a busy street. ISIS claimed responsibility for the attack, but authorities said he was only inspired by the group and there did not appear to be direct links.	1	2
Morocco	December 17	Murders of Louisa Vesterager Jespersen and Maren Ueland – Two female Scandiniavian tourists, a Danish and a Norwegian, were killed (one beheaded) near Imlil in the Atlas Mountains; the murderers filmed their action while branding the two women 'enemies of God' and saying their actions were God's will. Four suspects were arrested and Moroccan authorities said that they had pledged allegiance to the ISIL beforehand.	2	0

=== 2019 ===
Location	Date	Description	Deaths	Injuries
Kenya	January 15	Nairobi DusitD2 complex attack – Al-Shabaab militants attacked the DusitD2 hotel in Nairobi.	21+	0
Philippines	January 27	2019 Jolo Cathedral bombings – Two bombs exploded at the Our Lady of Mount Carmel Cathedral, Jolo, as worshipers gathered for Sunday Mass. ISIL claimed responsibility.	20+	102
India	February 14	A man rammed his car full of explosives into a convoy of soldiers. The attack was claimed by Pakistan-based terrorist organization, Jaish-e-Mohammed.	40 (+1)	35
Sri Lanka	April 21	2019 Sri Lanka Easter bombings – on Easter Sunday, three churches across the country and three luxury hotels in Colombo were bombed. Later that day, there were smaller explosions at a housing complex and a guest house. Authorities confirmed that the bombers were Sri Lankan citizens associated with National Thowheed Jamaath (NTJ), a local militant radical Islamist group, but foreign links were suspected.	269 (+8 bombers)	500+
Sri Lanka	April 27	April 2019 Kalmunai shootout – Security forces and militants from NTJ allegedly linked to ISIL clashed after the security forces raided a militant safe house, upon which three suicide bombers blew themselves up.	16	2
France	May 24	2019 Lyon bombing – Explosion outside a bakery in the center of Lyon. The suspect, a migrant from Algeria possessing jihadist propaganda, his parents and sibling were arrested.	-	13
Philippines	May 26	Abu Sayyaf militants attacked a group of soldiers in Jolo Island.	7	2
Afghanistan	August 17	17 August 2019 Kabul bombing – A suicide bomber detonated a bomb in a wedding hall.	92	142
United Kingdom	November 29	2019 London Bridge stabbing – Convicted Islamist terrorist Usman Khan stabbed members of the public on London Bridge before being wrestled to the floor by pedestrians and then shot dead by police.	2	3

=== 2020 ===
Location	Date	Description	Deaths	Injuries
Afghanistan	March 25	Kabul gurdwara attack –ISIL gunmen attacked a Sikh religious gathering and took dozens of hostages. At least 25 people were killed. After six hours of fighting 80 hostages were rescued.	25	—
Philippines	August 24	2020 Jolo bombings – A motorcycle bomb exploded on a busy street in Jolo, Sulu. As police and the military responded, a female suicide bomber detonated a second bomb, killing at least 14 people and wounding 75. ISIL is suspected of being behind the bombings.	14	75
France	October 16	Murder of Samuel Paty – A middle-school teacher was attacked and beheaded by an 18 year-old Chechen. The teacher had previously shown Charlie Hebdo-Cartoons depicting Muhammad during class. The culprit forewarned of his intentions using his Twitter account.	1	
Afghanistan	October 24	October 2020 Afghanistan attacks – A suicide bombing outside an educational centre in Kabul. The ISK claimed responsibility for the attack.	30+	70+
France	October 29	2020 Nice stabbing – Stabbing attack in Notre-Dame de Nice, one of the victims was beheaded.	3	
Austria	November 2	2020 Vienna attack – Shooting in Stadttempel, Vienna. The Vienna Police Department confirmed that the attacker was an ISIL sympathizer, and that the attack was motivated by Islamic extremism.	4	15
Mozambique	November 10	ISIL-linked militants attacked a village and turned a football pitch into an "execution site", where they beheaded and dismembered residents. State media reported that several more people were beheaded in another village. Executions and beheadings reportedly continued for two days.	50+	Unknown

== 2021–present ==
=== 2021 ===
Location	Date	Description	Deaths	Injuries
Pakistan	January 3	2021 Machh attack – ISIL claimed responsibility for killing miners in Machh, Balochistan, after kidnapping them and taking them to the mountains.	11	—
Iraq	January 21	January 2021 Baghdad bombings – ISIL targeted Shia muslims in a clothing market in Tayaran Square.	32	110
Niger	March 21	2021 Tahoua attacks – Gunmen attacked several villages around Tillia, Tahoua Region, Niger. While the attack was not claimed, the perpetrators are suspected to be the Islamic State in the Greater Sahara.	141	Unknown
Afghanistan	May 8	2021 Kabul school bombing – The attack targeted a girls' school in Dashte Barchi, a predominantly Shia area in western Kabul, Afghanistan. The attack took place in a neighborhood frequently attacked by ISIS-K.	90	240
Iraq	July 19	Near the eve of Eid al-Adha, an ISIL suicide bomber detonated his vest in a crowded market in the densely populated neighbourhood of Sadr City. Some shops burned down as a result of the explosion.	30	50
Afghanistan	August 26	2021 Kabul airport attack; ISIL claimed two suicide attacks near Hamid Karzai International Airport. 13 US service members and at least 170 Afghans were killed in the attacks.	183	200
New Zealand	September 3	2021 Auckland supermarket stabbing: An ISIL supporter stabbed multiple people before being shot by police in Auckland.	1	6

=== 2022 ===
Location	Date	Description	Deaths	Injuries
Pakistan	March 4	2022 Peshawar mosque attack – ISIS-K attacked a Shia mosque at Qissa Khwani Bazaar in Peshawar.	63+	196+
Somalia	March 23	March 2022 Somalia attacks; a series of coordinated attacks by al-Shabaab jihadists in Mogadishu and Beledweyne.	40+	108+
Nigeria	June 5	Owo church attack; mass shooting and bomb attack at a Catholic church in the city of Owo, Nigeria. Several members of the Islamic State – West Africa Province were arrested after the attack.	40+	Unknown
Burkina Faso	June 11	Seytenga massacre – Jihadists from the Islamic State in the Greater Sahara attacked the town of Seytenga, Burkina Faso.	100+	Unknown
Norway	June 25	2022 Oslo shooting – Shooting in a busy nightlife district.	2	21
India	June 28	Murder of Kanhaiya Lal – A Hindu tailor was murdered by two Muslim assailants in Udaipur. The assailants captured the attack on camera and circulated the video online. In a second video (taken after the attack), the assailants boasted about the murder to avenge the insult to Islam and also made threats against Prime Minister Narendra Modi.	1	
United States	August 12	Stabbing of Salman Rushdie – The Satanic Verses author Salman Rushdie was stabbed 33 years after a 1989 fatwa by Ayatollah Khomeini, condemning him for the book's allegorical presentation of the possible validity of the so-called Satanic Verses content of the Quran.		2
Egypt	August 30	A Christian father and son, Salama Waheeb and his son Hany, were shot dead in Gelbana, 20 kilometres east of El Qantara by ISIL militants. They were working in their fields at the time.	2	
Afghanistan	September 30	September 2022 Kabul school bombing – A suicide bombing suspected to be carried out by ISK at a tutorial centre during a mock exam for both men and women in a Hazara neighbourhood.	25	36
France	October 7	In Chateau-Thierry, a Muslim man stabbed his mother and younger brother and then went on a stabbing spree along the street before being apprehended by police while making Islamic prayers at the roadside.		6
Somalia	October 29	2022 Somali Ministry of Education bombings – Al-Shabaab claimed responsibility for a double car bombing in Mogadishu.	121+	350+

=== 2023 ===
Location	Date	Description	Deaths	Injuries
India	January 1–2	2023 Rajouri attacks – The first attack was a shooting which killed 4 people and injured 9. The second attack was an IED which killed 5 and injured 3.	7	12
India	April 8	Elathur train attack – Sharukh Saifi arsoned coach number D1 of the Alappuzha-Kannur Express, killing 3 passengers, including a child and injuring 9 anothers.		
Pakistan	July 30	2023 Khar bombing – ISK carried out a suicide bombing at a Jamiat Ulema-e-Islam (F) rally in Khar, Bajaur District, Khyber Pakhtunkhwa. and injuring over 200 others.	63+	200+
Mali	September 7	September 2023 Mali attacks – Al-Qaeda linked JNIM militants attacked a vessel carrying civilians on the Niger River.	154	Unknown
France	October 13	Arras school stabbing – A teacher was stabbed to death and two other people were wounded. The attacker shouted "Allahu akbar" according to police.	1	2
Afghanistan	October 13	2023 Pul-i-Khumri bombing – During prayer, there was an explosion in the Imam Zaman mosque. Some of the injuries were treated at Pul-i-Khumri Hospital while others were transferred to Kunduz hospital for treatment. The Islamic State – Khorasan Province claimed responsibility for the attack, identifying the attacker as "Sayfullah al-Muwahhid".	7	17
Belgium	October 16	2023 Brussels shooting – Two Swedish nationals were shot dead and a third person injured in the attack. In a video posted on social media, a man identifying himself as the gunman claimed "to be inspired by the Islamic State".	2	1

=== 2024 ===
Location	Date	Description	Deaths	Injuries
Iran	January 3	2024 Kerman bombings – ISIS-K carried out a suicide bombing on a commemorative ceremony for assassinated Iranian general Qasem Soleimani at his grave in eastern Kerman.	103	284
Turkey	January 28	2024 Istanbul church shooting – Two gunmen entered the Church of Santa Maria in Istanbul during Sunday mass and shot and killed a man before leaving. Islamic State claimed responsibility for the attack.	1	1
Russia	March 22	2024 Crocus City Hall attack – ISIS-K carried out an attack at a concert hall in Moscow, killing 145. Russian officials at first attempted to associate the attack with Ukraine, but it was later admitted to be the work of Islamic terrorists.	145	551
Afghanistan	May 17	2024 Bamyan shooting- a group of foreign tourists was attacked by gunmen at a market in Bamyan Province in central Afghanistan. ISIS-K claimed responsibility for the attack.	7	7
India	June 9	2024 Reasi attack – Pakistani-backed Islamist terrorists belonging to The Resistance Front attacked Hindu pilgrims returning from pilgrimage.	9	14
Russia	June 23	2024 Dagestan attacks-Two synagogues, two Eastern Orthodox churches, and a traffic police post were attacked simultaneously with automatic weapons and Molotov cocktails. ISIS claimed responsibility for the attack.	22	45
Oman	July 16	2024 Muscat mosque shooting-A shooting occurred in a Shia mosque in Muscat, Oman leaving 9 dead including three attackers and 30-50 injured. The ISIS have claimed responsibility for the attack.	9	30–50
Somalia	August 2	2024 Lido Beach attack – A suicide bomber detonated an explosive on Lido Beach near the Beach View Hotel. After the bombing, Al-Shabaab militants stormed a hotel and started shooting and killing people.	50+	212+
Burkina Faso	August 25	2024 Barsalogho attack – Al-Qaeda linked JNIM militants attacked civilians and soldiers digging defensive trenches around security outposts, killing at least 600 people and injuring at least 300 others.	600+	300+
Nigeria	September 3	Tarmuwa massacre – Boko Haram militants attacked a village in Yobe State, killing at least 130 villagers accused of collaborating with the Nigerian military.	130+	30+
Mali	September 17	2024 Bamako attacks – Armed men attacked several places in Bamako, killing at least 77 people and injuring 255 others. Al-Qaeda linked Jama'at Nasr al-Islam wal-Muslimin have claimed responsibility for the attack.	77+	255+

=== 2025 ===
Location	Date	Description	Deaths	Injuries
United States	January 1	2025 New Orleans truck attack – Shamsud-Din Bahar Jabbar (age 42) intentionally drove a pickup truck into a crowd of New Year Day's revelers on Bourbon Street in New Orleans' French Quarter early in the day, killing at least 14 people (excluding the perpetrator) and injuring 57 others and two police officers, before being killed in a shootout with police. The rear bumper of the truck held a black ISIS flag and the driver was found to have posted videos on social media pledging his support for the Islamic State group.	15	57
Austria	February 25	2025 Villach stabbing attack – 23-year-old Syrian attacked pedestrians with a knife and showed the Tawhid finger afterwards.	1	5
India	April 22	2025 Pahalgam attack – Terrorists affiliated with The Resistance Front, an affiliate of Pakistan-based Lashkar-e-Taiba and Hizbul Mujahideen, opened fire on a group of tourists at the Baisaran Valley in Jammu and Kashmir, India, and massacred at least 28 people and injured more than 20 others.	28	20
Syria	June 22	Mar Elias Church attack – at least one attacker opened fire and detonated an explosive device inside the Greek Orthodox Mar Elias Church as people were praying in Damascus, Syria, killing at least 25 people and injuring 63 others. The Syrian Ministry of Interior said the Islamic State was responsible for the suicide attack, while a group calling itself Saraya Ansar al-Sunnah claimed responsibility for the attack.	At least 25	63
India	November 10	2025 Delhi car explosion – a car exploded near the Red Fort in Delhi, India, killing at least 15 people and injuring more than 20 others.	At least 15	20+
Pakistan	November 11	2025 Islamabad suicide bombing – a suicide bomber set off an explosion outside of the District Judicial Complex in Islamabad, the capital of Pakistan, killing 12 people and injuring 36, after attempting to enter the structure. Jamaat-ul-Ahrar, a faction of the Tehrik-e-Taliban Pakistan (TTP), claimed responsibility for the attack.	13 (+1)	36
Australia	December 14	2025 Bondi Beach shooting – a terrorist mass shooting occurred at Archer Park beside Bondi Beach in Sydney, Australia, in the late afternoon during a Hanukkah celebration attended by approximately one thousand people. Two gunmen shot at the crowd, killing 15 people, including a child.	16 (+1)	40 (+1)

== See also ==
- List of terrorist incidents
- List of terrorist incidents linked to the Islamic State
- Terrorism in Europe
