= Barsalogho massacre =

Central Burkina Faso massacre by jihadist insurgents

- Part of Islamist insurgency in Burkina Faso
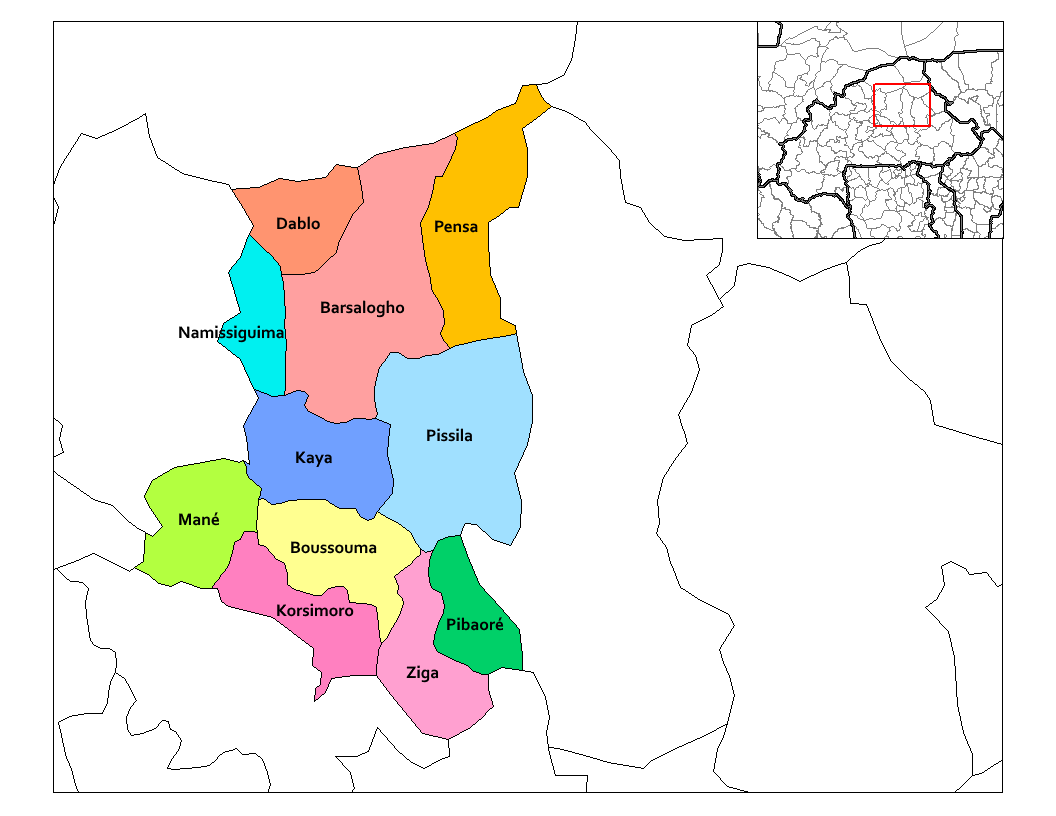
- Location of Barsalogho Department in Sanmatenga Province, Burkina Faso
- Location: 13.415°N 1.0564°W; Barsalogho, Barsalogho Department, Burkina Faso
- Date: 24 August 2024
- Target: Civilians digging trenches
- Deaths: 200–600
- Injuries: 300
- Perpetrator: Jama'at Nasr al-Islam wal-Muslimin

On 24 August 2024, jihadists from Jama'at Nusrat al-Islam wal-Muslimin (JNIM) killed between 200 and 600 civilians digging trenches for the Burkinabe government around the town of Barsalogho, Sanmatenga Province, Burkina Faso. The massacre is the deadliest in Burkinabe history, and the deadliest attack in the Islamist insurgency in Burkina Faso.

== Background ==
Much of northern and eastern Burkina Faso has been the frontline of an insurgency waged by Jama'at Nusrat al-Islam wal-Muslimin (JNIM) and the Islamic State in the Greater Sahara since 2015, with these groups intensifying their attacks on civilians seen as sympathetic to the government since 2019. Within Burkina Faso, ISGS is predominantly active in the tri-border area between Mali, Niger, and Burkina Faso. Since the September 2022 Burkina Faso coup d'état that saw Ibrahim Traoré rise to power, the Burkinabe government and VDP auxiliaries have conducted massacres against civilian areas that have killed hundreds of civilians.

By August 2024, JNIM was encroaching the city of Kaya in Barsalogho Department, which represented the last defensive line between JNIM and the Burkinabe capital Ouagadougou. New trenches had been built around the city of Barsalogho in 2022, and were expanded extensively in 2023. A western trench was built between 6 and 18 August, and an eastern trench, where the attack took place, was built between 22 and 24 August.

The trenches were built by civilians forcefully recruited by the government, and the jihadists attacked while construction was ongoing. JNIM accused the victims of being collaborators with the government or militiamen, although video footage showed all civilians unarmed. Many civilians had previously resisted efforts by the government to dig trenches. On the morning of the attack, jihadists had been spotted nearby. Burkinabe junta leader Ibrahim Traoré had earlier said "Everyone has to get to work ... I don't want to hear anymore 'we are under attack'. You are going to mobilize your populations to dig trenches while the machines arrive at your home."

== Attack ==
At about 9am on 24 August, armed men rode up to the eastern trench on motorcycles while a large number of civilians were digging. At the time of the attack, fifteen Burkinabe soldiers and fifteen VDP militiamen were guarding the civilians. In one area, twenty motorcycles had come from the direction of Nyanga, and the militants dismounted when they got closer to the trenches. Immediately after dismounting, the militants opened fire on the civilians digging. A survivor of the massacre said that he was four kilometers from the town when he heard gunshots, and hid in the trench to survive. As he was crawling, he stumbled upon dead bodies and "there was blood everywhere on my way. There was screaming everywhere."

Videos of the massacre, taken mostly by JNIM fighters, show dozens of bloodied men with shovels and pickaxes lying in the trenches. A survivor told Human Rights Watch that the militants shot like they had endless ammunition. The soldiers and VDP on site were either killed fighting back in the massacre or fled. Soldiers at the military base in the town of Barsalogho, which was not attacked, dispatched a military vehicle and an ambulance, both of which were captured. The perpetrators spoke Fulfulde, the language of the Fulani people. The attack ended around 4pm.

== Aftermath ==
=== Casualties and responsibility ===
The Burkinabe government did not release a casualty count, but security minister Mahamadou Sana vowed retribution against the perpetrators. Sana stated that several people were killed, and the wounded were receiving humanitarian assistance.

The United Nations estimated that 200 people were killed and 140 were injured, but the Collectif Justice Pour Barsalogho, a human rights organization founded by survivors shortly after the attack, stated that 400 people were killed. CNN, citing a French government assessment, estimated that over 600 people were killed. The bodies were dumped at the Barsalogho City Hall, where witnesses said that around 250 to 300 corpses were deposited. Videos showed 133 corpses in the trenches.

Medical sources at the hospital in Kaya said 300 gravely wounded victims were outside the hospital after the attack. Some wounded were treated at a local hospital in Barsalogho or in Ouagadougou.

JNIM stated that the attack was retribution for the Yirgou massacre, where in 2019 pro-government militias killed over 300 Fulani civilians. In their statement, JNIM claimed responsibility for the massacre and said that over 300 people were killed. They also stated that none of the people killed were civilians, but instead soldiers or collaborationist militiamen.

=== Aftermath ===
On 18 August 2024, JNIM fighters attacked a Malian Army and Wagner Group base in Melgue, Mali. A video of the attack circulated online on the same day as the Barsalogho massacre and was misattributed to the incident.

Following the attack, VDP militiamen began using machinery to finish digging the trenches.

== See also ==
- War in the Sahel
- 2024 Bamako attacks
- List of terrorist incidents in 2024
- List of Islamist terrorist attacks
