= 2024 Bamako attacks =

Mali attack by jihadist insurgents

- Part of Mali War
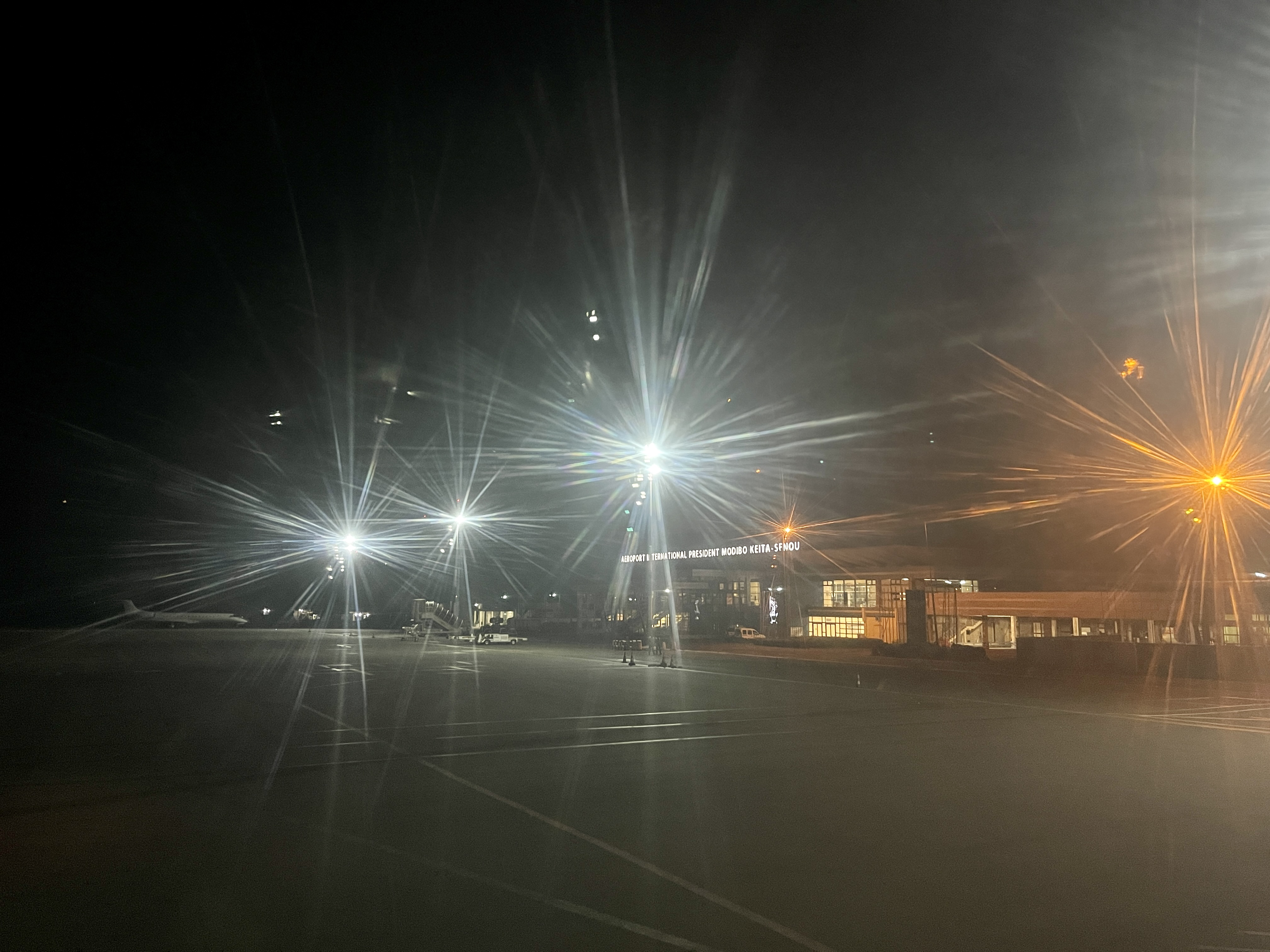
- Modibo Keita International Airport in 2023
Date	17 September 2024
Location	Faladie and Modibo Keita International Airport, Bamako, Mali
Result	Inconclusive: JNIM causes heavy losses in Malian troops and equipment; Malian forces quell attack

Belligerents
Mali Armed Forces; Mali Gendarmerie; Wagner Group	Jama'at Nusrat al-Islam wal-Muslimin

Commanders and leaders
Oumar Diarra	Salman al-Bambari; Abdul-Salam al-Fulani

Strength
Unknown	10 (per JNIM)

Casualties and losses
77-100 killed	10 killed (per JNIM); 20 killed or arrested (per Mali)
- 1 UN personnel injured 1 alleged militant lynched

On 17 September 2024, gunmen from a cell of Jama'at Nasr al-Islam wal-Muslimin (JNIM) attacked several locations across Bamako, the capital of Mali, including Malian Army and Wagner Group bases and Modibo Keita International Airport. About 100 Malian soldiers and policemen were killed and more than 255 others were injured.

== Background ==
Al-Qaeda aligned groups have waged an insurgency in central and northeastern Mali since 2012, and gaining steam in 2017 with the formation of Jama'at Nasr al-Islam wal-Muslimin. Bamako, the Malian capital, had been attacked a few times in 2015 with the most notable being the Radisson Blu attack that killed 22. Since then, no attacks have occurred in Bamako, although JNIM cells have expanded westward into Koulikoro Region and Sikasso Region since then.

== Attacks ==
The attacks began in the early morning of 17 September 2024 at around 05:00, when gunmen attacked several locations across Bamako including the Banankabougou neighborhood, the Faladie military police school housing elite units of the Malian gendarmerie in the southeast of Bamako, and the nearby military airport, which the JNIM claimed to have fully taken. The attacks prompted the closure of Modibo Keita International Airport, which adjoins the military airport and a Wagner Group base located there, while clashes were also reported at a police station controlling access to the former.

JNIM fighters released videos destroying six aircraft, including two Casa C-295 of the Malian Air Force, and one video showing a militant setting fire to the engine of the presidential jet. In their statement claiming responsibility for the attack, JNIM stated that it destroyed a drone, planes, and several armored vehicles. An aircraft used for humanitarian work by the World Food Programme was also damaged on the ground.

In Faladie, government forces quickly quelled the attack, although at the airport clashes lasted for nine hours. Chief of Staff Oumar DIarra visited Faladie later that day and stated all JNIM fighters had been killed or captured.

== Casualties ==
Malian junta authorities did not release a death toll, only acknowledging "some loss of human life." At least twenty people were arrested by Malian forces in connection to the attack, but JNIM stated that the arrested weren't affiliated with them. One of the detainees was lynched and his body burned by a crowd.

JNIM, in their statement claiming responsibility, stated that the attack left several hundred people dead or wounded and caused "heavy losses to Wagner's mercenaries." JNIM stated around ten fighters took part in the attack and all were killed. Salman al-Bambari was reported by JNIM to have led the assault on the gendarmerie school with two teams of inghimasi, while Abdul-Salam al-Fulani led the assault on the airport.

According to civilian and military sources interviewed by RFI, over seventy people were killed during the attacks, including 20 at the air base. 200 Malian gendarmes and soldiers were wounded as well. Le Monde reported that at the gendarmerie school in Faladie, over sixty gendarme students were killed. That same day, Agence France-Presse reported a toll of 77 killed and 255 injured, with one officer stating over a hundred people were killed, with a list of 81 names. Malian daily newspaper Le Soir de Bamako announced the funerals of over fifty student gendarmes. One UN security personnel was injured.

At least ten Wagner soldiers were killed in the attack, according to a Malian military source.

== Reactions ==
The attacks were condemned by multiple countries and organizations including the United Nations, the African Union, ECOWAS, the World Food Programme, Senegal, France and the United Kingdom.

Criticism of the attacks within Mali was limited due to severe restrictions on freedom of expression by the ruling military junta, with the exception of a few media outlets such as the Senegalese newspaper Nouvel Horizon, which wrote that it was "time to apportion blame at all levels". On 19 September, Abdoulaye Coulibaly, the governor of Bamako, ordered the indefinite closure of seven livestock markets in the city for "reasons of public order", raising concerns that it was being used to target members of the Fulani ethnic group, who operate most of the markets and are accused of supporting Islamist militants due to high membership rates in the said groups.

On 24 September, Mali's military leader Assimi Goïta held a meeting with the country's defense establishment to review security arrangements and "adjust strategy". Goita also paid tribute to the victims of the attack, adding that it showed "the imperative need to remain vigilant and maintain an exemplary operational stance in all circumstances".

Jean-Herve Jezequel, Sahel project director at the International Crisis Group, said that one possible reason for the attack could be that "the jihadists are trying to send a message to the Malian authorities that they can hit them anywhere and therefore that the big cities must also be protected". He said the militants may want to force Mali to concentrate its resources in areas where more people live and deploy fewer troops in rural areas where the jihadists have their strongholds.

In neighboring Burkina Faso, the government banned the Voice of America from broadcasting in the country for three months starting in October 2024, citing a journalist calling the attack in Bamako "courageous" among other reasons.

== See also ==
- War in the Sahel
- 2024 Barsalogho attack
- List of terrorist incidents in 2024
- List of Islamist terrorist attacks
