= 2024 Kandahar New Kabul Bank bombing =

Islamic State attack in Afghanistan

- Part of Islamic State–Taliban conflict
- 2024 Kandahar New Kabul Bank bombing (Afghanistan)
- Location: 31°37′12″N 65°42′57″E; Kandahar, Afghanistan
- Date: 21 March 2024; 2 years ago 8:00 (UTC+04:30)
- Target: Taliban
- Attack type: Suicide bombing
- Weapon: Explosive belt
- Deaths: 21+
- Injuries: 50+
- Perpetrator: Islamic State – Khorasan Province
- Assailant: Asadbek Madiyarov

On 21 March 2024, IS–K carried out a suicide bombing on a New Kabul Bank branch in Kandahar, Afghanistan around 8:00 AFT (03:30 GMT) killing at least 21 and injuring at least 51, targeting Taliban workers who were collecting their wages.

Hospital staff stated that the dead included several members of the Taliban.

The suicide bomber was identified by the pro-Taliban al-Mirsad website as Asadbek Madiyarov, a citizen of Uzbekistan.

Iran and Pakistan both condemned the attack.

== See also ==
- List of terrorist incidents linked to Islamic State – Khorasan Province
- List of terrorist incidents in 2024
- List of massacres in Afghanistan
