= Tarmuwa massacre =

2024 massacre in Tarmuwa, Nigeria

- Part of the Boko Haram insurgency
- Location: Mafa, Tarmuwa, Yobe State, Nigeria
- Date: 3 September 2024
- Target: Villagers, worshippers, and farmers
- Attack type: Mass shootings · massacre · looting · arson
- Weapons: Firearms; Fire; Rocket-propelled grenades
- Deaths: 130
- Injuries: 30+
- Perpetrator: Islamic State
- No. of participants: 50+
- Motive: Revenge for villagers telling security operatives about their activities

On 3 September 2024, over 50 armed Islamic State militants attacked the district of Tarmuwa in Yobe State, Nigeria, killing 130 villagers.

== Background ==
The Boko Haram insurgency began in 2009, when the group started an armed rebellion against the government of Nigeria.

ISWAP claimed that the men of the village were "supporting and coordinating" with the Nigerian army and therefore labeled them as "apostates", heading to the village to commit this massacre.

== Attack ==
The attack began when over 50 extremists on motorcycles carried out attacks in the Nigerian local government area of Tarmuwa. The extremists looted and set shops, houses and schools ablaze, carried out mass shootings at markets and houses, shot worshippers and farmers. 130 villagers were killed in the attack. The militants put up posters during the massacre threatening to do the same to other villages who commit "treachery".

== Responses ==
The Nigerian police blamed the attack on Boko Haram.

Community leader Zanna Umar confirmed that at least 102 villagers were killed, and stated "We are still working to search for more because many people are still missing"

Local chief Buba Adamu stated “This is the first time our community has faced such a devastating attack,” and “We never imagined something like this could happen here.”

President Bola Tinubu condemned the attack as an "atrocious and cowardly act of terror".

Two mass burials were held a day after the attack on 4 September. 87 people were buried in the village of Babbangida, while 40 others were buried in Mafa.

== Responsibility ==
On 12 September, the Islamic State, via its weekly Al-Naba newsletter, claimed responsibility for the massacre, stating that their fighters had separated the men from the women and children, before executing 127 of them (the men), while at least 30 others were wounded.

The group continued by adding that they left behind a letter at the scene of the massacre accusing the villagers of collaborating with the Nigerian military against the jihadists. The group also accused the villagers of being responsible for the deaths of 9 IS fighters in recent months, as well as requesting for the Nigerian military to set up a military base in the town. IS also alleged that nearby villages had stopped interacting with these accused villagers due to their alleged "collaboration" with the Nigerian military, and that IS fighters had warned them many times to stop assisting the military.

The newsletter also featured two graphic images showing Islamic State members standing over a large pile of dead men.

== See also ==
- List of terrorist incidents in 2024
- List of Islamist terrorist attacks
- List of massacres in Nigeria
