= 2024 Ulu Tiram police station attack =

Armed attack in Ulu Tiram, Malaysia

- Location: 1°36′02.9″N 103°49′14.8″E; Ulu Tiram Police Station, Ulu Tiram, Johor, Malaysia
- Date: 17 May 2024; 02:30 a.m. (UTC+8:00)
- Target: Royal Malaysia Police
- Attack type: Stabbing attack, shooting, terrorism
- Weapons: Parang; Walther P99 pistol; HK MP5 Submachine Gun
- Deaths: 3 (including the perpetrator)
- Injuries: 1
- Perpetrator: Radin Luqman Radin Imran
- No. of participants: 1
- Motive: Seizing firearms to commit other attacks (suspected), Islamic extremism
- Accused: 5 family members of the perpetrator
- Convictions: Radin Imran Radin Mohd Yassin (father): Inciting, promoting or soliciting property for the commission of terrorist acts (Section 130G) — 30 years imprisonment; Soliciting or giving support to terrorist groups or for the commission of terrorist acts (Section 130J(1)) — 30 years imprisonment; Possession of items associated with terrorist groups or terrorist acts (Section 130JB(1)(a)) — 3 years imprisonment; Radin Romyullah (brother): Soliciting or giving support to terrorist groups or for the commission of terrorist acts (Section 130J(1)(a)) — 30 years imprisonment; Possession of items associated with terrorist groups or terrorist acts (Section 130JB(1)(a)) — 3 years imprisonment; Rosna Jantan (mother): Intentional omission to give information relating to terrorist acts (Section 130M) — 4 years imprisonment
- Convicted: Father, mother, and brother convicted; Two sisters acquitted

The 2024 Ulu Tiram police station attack was an attack that occurred on 17 May 2024 on the Malaysian police station in Ulu Tiram, Johor, Malaysia. Two police officers were killed while one was left injured. The sole attacker, identified as Radin Luqman Radin Imran, was fatally shot thereafter. Malaysian authorities initially identified the deceased suspect as a member of Jemaah Islamiyah (JI) due to his father's connection with the terrorist group, although it was later reported that he had no involvement with JI and had acted alone. Instead, it was later confirmed that the attack was inspired by the ideologies of the Islamic State (IS) terror group, and the father of the suspect has been indoctrinating his family with extremist beliefs years prior to the attack.

== Incident ==
On 17 May 2024, at around 1 am, two college students who was a couple at the time entered the Ulu Tiram police station to file a report regarding an alleged molestation incident that occurred two years ago. One of the students, Muhamad Farhan Haiqim Mohd Isa, spoke to a police officer, Constable Ahmad Azza Fahmi Azhar, outside the station for about 30 minutes. After which a man dressed in black, wearing a mask, with an IS flag drapped over its shoulder (Note: The detail of the attacker wearing an Islamic State flag or banner was not reported in the news, and was only revealed by a law enforcement source in a CTC Sentinel publication.) arrived at the station compound with a motorcycle and parked at the side of the station. Ahmad Azza Fahmi then went to investigate the man.

After 15 minutes, Muhamad Farhan heard loud screams from Azza Fahmi as he was fatally slashed in his head by the man and had his firearm, a Walther P99 pistol, taken by the suspect. Mohamad Farhan then rushed back into the station building to call for help, and hid under a table with his girlfriend.

At around 2:30 am, the police station chief Inspector Mohd Hisyam Ezahar received a distress call from Lance Corporal Muhammad Aznel Salleh, informing him about a masked man armed with a parang had entered the station. The station chief, who was at his rental house at the time, ordered the crime prevention patrol units to be contacted and sent a message to the station's WhatsApp group instructing all personnel to return immediately, before rushing to the scene by his own vehicle.

Two policemen in the crime prevention patrol unit, Corporal Mohd Khairul Azhar Abbi Paisa and Corporal Mohd Hasif Roslan, rushed back to the station with their Toyota Hilux after receiving the message from their station chief Mohd Hisyam. Upon arrival, they found the surroundings dim and quiet.

After exiting their vehicle, Mohamad Aznel shouted at them to retreat from the front of the station and told them that Ahmad Azza Fahmi had been attacked. Mohd Khairul then saw the attacked police officer lying on the ground between the station building and the barracks area, with slash wounds across his face from the ear to the mouth.

Mohd Khairul, Aznel, and another policeman Muhamad Syafiq then took cover near a vending machine at the front of the station, before a man emerging from the barracks area firing shots at them under low-light conditions. Aznel then instructed Mohd Khairul and Muhamad Syafiq to move to the back of the station to locate the attacker, but both men were being fired upon again.

The three policemen then ran back and regrouped behind the station chief's office, before Aznel went out to seek assistance while the two remaining officers and Mohd Hasif took cover near an armoured vehicle located at the front of the station. During this time, the officers attempted to assess the back of the station building and saw the attacker continue to fire shots at them.

Mohd Hasif, in an attempt to draw the attacker's attention, ran to the station's gate and was subsequently shot in the left shoulder and hip. Following this, Muhamad Syafiq was also shot in the head by the attacker when him and Mohd Khairul were taking cover at the front of the armoured vehicle.

Mohd Khairul then saw the attacker attempting to remove Muhamad Syafiq's HK MP5 submachine gun from his body, when he peered from under the front tyre of the armoured vehicle. This prompted him to fire a shot at the attacker with his pistol, which hit the attacker, who was still able to move. Mohd Khairul then attempted to fired a second shot but the pistol was jammed. After moving to the back of the vehicle and clearing the jam, he fired a second shot and successfully hit the attacker again. The attacker, who was wearing dark clothes, a mask, and carrying a backpack, then lies lifeless beside Muhamad Syafiq near the front left tyre of the armoured vehicle.

According to a testimony by Mohd Khairul later in a court trial, the gunfight lasted for around 30 to 40 minutes, and there are only five police officers on duty at that night, of which two were stationed at the police report counter, one for sentinel duty, and the remaining two for patrol duty in the police district.

During the ordeal, when the station chief Mohd Hisyam arrived at the scene, he found Aznel and Mohd Hasif at the flyover opposite the police station, where Aznel was in a state of panic while Mohd Hasif was bloodied and injured. He told both of his men to wait there before attempting to enter the station. He was however stopped by his men and was forced to regrouped with his men outside.

The station chief then contacted his superiors and the district police chief, who ordered him to wait for the CID team to arrive. The situation ended when the CID team arrived at the scene at around 3:30 am, in which two policemen, Ahmad Azza Fahmi and Mohd Syafiq, and the attacker, later identified as Radin Luqman Radin Imran, were confirmed to have died on the scene, while Mohd Hasif was rushed to the hospital for treatment.

Meanwhile, the two college students who hid inside the station building made an emergency call through 999 after hearing the gunshots, and the station soon received a phone call from the dispatch center, which was picked up by Muhamad Farhan himself, one of the college students, who confirmed with the dispatch center that a shooting incident has occurred. They remained in the station building until they were escorted to the flyover opposite the station.

Following the attack, forensic search on the crime scene recovered a parang, a survival knife, (Note: The survival knife was not used in the attack.) a Walther P99 pistol, a HK MP5 submachine gun, a self-made zinc-plated armor, (Note: This home-made armor consisted of metal sheets, zinc, papers, and clothes, which were stuffed inside the backpack.) a backpack, and an Islamic State banner.

=== Arrests ===
Both college students, who was filing a police report at the station, were apprehended for questioning in relation to their connection to the attack. At aroun 6 or 7 am, police traced the registration number of the motorcycle rode by the attacker and stormed his family home in Ulu Tiram, resulting in the arrest of five of his family members who were also suspected to be members of JI. The police also seized four handphones, six books (some titled "jihad", one titled "Al-Jihad Sabiluna" and one titiled "Shariat-Minhaj-Ujian"), four air rifles, nine PVC pipes suspected to be used to produce air rifles, and a pouch containing 42 marbles. Other weapons such as bows, a crossbow, arrows, spears, parangs, kerambits and knives were also seized.

On 19 May, it was revealed that the family have been living in isolation before their arrests, with the attacker only attending school up until Standard Four; his elder brother up to Form Five; one younger sister until Standard Six, and his youngest sister never attended school.

On 21 May, both of the college students were released unconditionally by the police on the instructions of the Attorney General's Chambers. No reasons were given on their release.

On 24 May, all five of the suspect's family members were re-arrested under the Security Offences (Special Measures) Act 2012 (SOSMA) after their initial remand order expired on that day.

On 19 June, the suspect's five family members, including his parents, an elder brother and two sisters, were officially charged in court for alleged terrorism-related offences. Local authorities identified the suspect's mother as a Singaporean citizen, while the rest of the suspect's family members were Malaysians.

== Court trials ==
=== Criminal charges ===
On 19 June 2024, all five family members of the perpetrator were charged before the Johor Bahru Sessions Court under heavy security presence. They were all initially unrepresented in court, but were later represented by defence lawyer Faizal Rahman. Their respective charges are as follows:

Radin Imran Radin Mohd Yassin, father, 62:

- Promoting Islamic State (IS) related terrorism ideology to all his five family members between end of 2014 and 17 May 2024 — charged under Section 130G(a) of the Penal Code, punishable with up to 30 years imprisonment;
- Supporting IS terrorism activities by possessing four self-made air rifles at around 10:45am on 17 May 2024 — charged under Section 130J(1)(b) of the same Code, punishable with up to 40 years imprisonment;
- Pledging allegiance (bay'ah) to IS leader Abu Bakar al-Baghdadi at the end of 2014 — charged under Section 130J(1)(a), punishable with up to 40 years imprisonment;
- Possessing an IS-related book titled "Hakikat Islam & Hakikat Syirik" who was authored by Abu Sulaiman Aman Abdurrahman — charged under Section 130JB(1)(a), punishable with up to 7 years prison and a fine.

Radin Romyullah, brother, 34:

- Pledging allegiance to IS leader Abu Bakar al-Baghdadi between the end of 2014 and May 2017 — charged under Section 130J(1)(a), punishable with up to 40 years imprisonment;
- Possessing an external hard disc that contained materials related to IS and the group's activities — charged under Section 130JB(1)(a), punishable with up to 7 years imprisonment and a fine.

Rosna Jantan, mother, 59; Farhah Sobrina, sister, 23; Mariah, sister, 19:

- Deliberately omitting to give information related to terrorism between April 2017 and 17 May 2024 — charged under Section 130M, punishable with up to 7 years imprisonment or a fine, or with both.

All the charges were alleged to have committed in a house at No. 15, Lot 1288, Jalan Rabani, Kampung Sungai Tiram, Johor. No bail were offered to the accused as they were detained under SOSMA.

On 31 July, the court ordered one of the accused, Mariah, the youngest sister in the family, to be sent to hospital for treatment, after the defence lawyer noticed signs of depression on Mariah during his meetup with the five accused at the Simpang Rengam Prison back in late June 2024. On 2 September, the prosecution requested for a discharge not amounting to acquittal (DNAA) on the fourth charge of Radin Imran on ground of technicality, and replaced it with a similar charge, which was allowed by the court.

On 24 September, their cases were transferred to the Kuala Lumpur High Court on the request of the prosecution. The father and the brother were subsequently transferred to the Sungai Buloh Prison, while the mother and one of the sisters, Farhah Sobrina were transferred to the Kajang Prison. Meanwhile, Mariah was further ordered to undergo one month of mental evaluation at the Permai Hospital in Johor Bahru.

On 30 September, the mother pleaded not guilty to her charge before the Kuala Lumpur High Court, while the brother similarly pleaded not guilty to all two of his charges before the same court on 16 October. The father and Farhah Sobrina also denied guilt on all their charges on 23 October, followed by Mariah who also pleaded not guilty on 27 November. Although the prosecution requested for all five accused to be tried together in the same trial, the High Court however on 20 January 2025 rejected the application and only allowed for the cases of the mother and the two sisters be tried together, citing potential prejudices against the interests of the accused.

=== Trials and testimonies ===
During a court trial on 9 April 2025, Muhamad Farhan Haiqim Mohd Isa, 24, the male college student who was filing a police report with his then-girlfriend on the day of the incident and was subsequently arrested, testified in court that he was held in the same jail cell with the father and brother of the perpretrator at the Seri Aman police station's lock-up after the incident.

During his conversation with the father in the cell, he testified that the father was sadden on why his son did not invite him to join the attack against the police station. The father, Radin Imran, said to him that a "green bird" has taken his son's spirit to heaven. The father also purportedly told Muhamad Farhan that it is "halal (permissible) for them to shed the blood of police, soldiers and government officials". Radin Imran also stated that he rarely left the house, but if he did, he "had a duty to wage jihad to spread his beliefs". Radin Imran was also dissatisfied with his elder brother who did not subscribe to his ideology, and expressing intention to kill him.

Muhamad Farhan testified that he initially felt sympathy for the arrested father, but later perceived him as a dangerous individual and feared for his safety. Meanwhile, he described that Radin Romyullah, the brother of the perpetrator, as a quiet man and hence did not speak to the brother in the jail cell.

Following Farhan's testimony, the defence team argued that Farhan's testimony is biased and irrelevant to the current case, as he was detained under Section 302 of the Penal Code for suspected murder, while his clients were charged under other provisions of the law. He also argued that the prosecution had not reveal the relevant documents beforehand and only presented the testimony at this stage, therefore it is unfair for his clients.

In response, the prosecution rebutted that it is a direct conversation between the witness and the accused, not a re-telling by a third party. The prosecution also cited that under Section 18A of SOSMA, any oral or written statement by the accused at anytime can be admitted as evidence in court.

The judge then allowed the prosecution to proceed with the examination-in-chief over Farhan's testimony, and directs that the court will decide whether such testimony is relevant or not during the course of the trial. The judge also ordered the prosecution to hand in relevant documents to the defence on that day, after the defence team citing they will be unable to proceed with the cross examination before obtaining such documents from the prosecution.

The documents were handed to the defence at 9:00 pm, and the defence requested for a postponement of the trial on the next day, citing further discussion is needed with his clients over the documents and needing time for his clients to recount the incident that happened two years ago. The request was granted by the court and the trial was adjourned until 17 April.

On 17 April, the defence team further disputed Farhan's credibility, citing that there are discrepancies with his clients' account on their placement in the lock-up, where according to the accused's account, the two accused (Radin Imran and Radin Romyullah) were placed at the front area of the lock-up while Muhamad Farhan was detained at the back area, contradicting with Farhan's testimony. The defence team therefore requested for the lock-up registration records and CCTV recordings from the prosecution as proof.

On the same day, Assistant Superintendent Cassidy Banta testified in court that when the police stormed the attacker's house and informed his parents of Radin Luqman's death and his killings of two policemen, the mother reacted by stating that "Alhamdulillah, baguslah tu" (Praise be to God, that is good), while his father also said that "Saya cuma kesal kerana dia tidak ajak saya ikut bersama" (I only regret that he did not ask me to go along).

=== Confessions ===
On 27 April, in a written statement made under Section 18A of SOSMA, the brother of the attacker, Radin Romyullah, admitted to wishing to kill any police officer wherever he encountered them, if given the opportunities. He also admitted to fantasising about loading his family into a van packed with explosives to attack the National Day parade, targeting the security forces such as police and military, particularly commandos.

He also considered his younger brother's attack justifiable as he saw the police and military as infidels. He further stated that he knew his beliefs are contrary to Malaysian laws and have to hide it from public knowledge. However, he stated that he still maintained such beliefs to this day and viewed his younger brother's actions as part of jihad.

Radin Romyullah also stated that his father told him that "there's no need to go far for jihad, see them anywhere, came in quietly, zass" while making a striking hand gesture. He further explained that "see them anywhere" meant seeing the police, while the "zass" sound and striking hand gesture referred to the use of sharp object to kill police officers.

Menwhile, the prosecution claimed that the father often declared those who do not share his beliefs as infidels, frequently preached about taghut (idols or false authorities), and incited hatred towards the government and security forces. The prosecution described that Radin Imran's family have been living in isolation from the local community since they moved into their house in 1990s. Words expressing hatred against government and security forces were also found written on the walls of his house, some of which declared the government and security forces as taghut and must be fought with. In between 2013 and 2015, Radin Imran were exposed to IS ideology and began seeing Abu Bakar al-Baghdadi as a symbol of his struggle. He also expressed intentions to attack police and police station, and viewed deaths in such attacks as martyrdom. The father in a written statement admitted that he believes the IS terror group that emerged back in 2014 is the caliphate promised by Prophet Muhammad and he had pledged allegiance to the group in Arabic.

In a similar written statement, the mother also admitted that a few days before the incident, her husband had asked their elder son Radin Romyullah whether he dare to attack a police station, and talked about "living an honour life and dying a martyr". She also confessed that her husband had indoctrinated the whole family with IS ideology with videos from the terror group.

=== Sentencing ===
On 27 April 2026, the father of the perpetrator, Radin Imran Radin Mohd Yassin, 64, changed his plea and pleaded guilty to all four terrorism-related charges under the Penal Code. He was sentenced by the Kuala Lumpur High Court to 30 years imprisonment each for the first three charges, and 3 years for the last offence.

The brother of the perpetrator, Radin Romyullah, 36, also pleaded guilty to his two charges of providing support to terrorist acts and possessing IS-related materials. He was sentenced to 30 years imprisonment for the first charge, and 3 years imprisonment for the second charge.

The mother of the perpetrator, Rosna Jantan, 61, was also sentenced to 4 years jail after pleading guilty to the charge of failing to disclose information relating to terroristic ideology. Meanwhile, the sisters of the perpetrator, Farhah Sobrina, 25, and Mariah, 21, were acquitted after the prosecution withdrew the charges of failing to disclose information relating to terroristic ideology against them.

The High Court then ordered all of the prison sentences of Radin Imran, Radin Romyullah, and Rosna Jantan to run concurrently from 17 May 2024, the date of their arrest.

== Aftermath ==
=== Funerals ===
The bodies of the two slain policemen and the attacker were taken to the Sultan Ismail Hospital for autopsy on 17 May 2024, the day of the incident. The remains of the two policemen were taken to the Tunku Laksamana Abdul Jalil Mosque in the Johor contingent police headquarters the following morning for funeral prayers. The funeral prayers were attended by inspector-general of police Razarudin Husain, home minister Saifuddin Nasution Ismail, and queen Raja Zarith Sofiah, as well as other police officers and the family members of the deceased policemen.

After the funeral prayers in Johor, the body of Ahmad Azza Fahmi was sent back to his hometown in Kampung Poh Tambahan, Bidor, Perak and was buried at the Kampung Poh Muslim Cemetery at 6:43 pm on that day. The burial ceremony was joined by around 1,000 people, including deputy inspector-general of police Ayob Khan Mydin Pitchay, police officers, family members, and villagers. Meanwhile, the remains of Muhamad Syafiq Ahmad Said was sent back to his home in Taman Seri Mahkota Jaya, Gambang, Pahang, before being buried at the nearby Batu 8 Muslim Cemetery at 5:50 pm.

On 20 May 2024, the Fatwa Committee under the Johor State Islamic Religious Department declared the two deceased policemen as martyrs (syahid akhirat), as they died while defending the safety of the country and in the cause of God. Simultaneously, the Fatwa Committee directs that the funeral rites for the attacker, Radin Luqman, may not be conducted in any mosque or surau and that he shall be buried away from other graves in the cemetery, to serve as a "warning" or "reminder". The remains of the attacker was buried at the rear of the Kampung Sungai Tiram Muslim Cemetery in Batu 19, Kampung Sungai Tiram, Johor, 300 metres away from other existing graves, at 12:30 pm on that day. His funerals was attended only by a few villagers, with several police officers guarding at the scene.

A new surau, Surau Al-Fahmi, was built in Kampung Poh Tambahan, Bidor, which is named after the slain police officer Ahmad Azza Fahmi. Construction started in August 2024 and it became operational in March 2025. Part of the construction funds came from the RM13,000 donation received by Fahmi's father from the Retired Senior Police Officers' Association (RESPA), while the remaining funds came from the Perak state government, which contributed RM400,000.

=== Recovery ===
Mohd Hasif Roslan, the police officer who was struck in his left shoulder and the hip during the gunfight, was transferred from the hospital's red zone to normal ward later in the same day of the incident. He was discharged from the hospital on 25 May and was given two months leave. He returned to police duty in mid-August 2024 at the Kota Tinggi police district headquarters.

=== Rank promotions and financial aid ===
On 15 June 2024, Mohd Hasif, who have served with the police force for 14 years, was promoted to the rank of Sergeant. His two other surviving colleagues, Mohd Khairul and Muhamad Aznel, were also both promoted to the rank of Corporal. As for the two deceased policemen, Ahmad Azza Fahmi and Muhamad Syafiq, who have only served in the force for less than two years, were posthumously promoted to the rank of Corporal. The family of the two deceased policemen also each received ex gratia and insurance payouts totaling around RM280 thousands from the government.

On 22 August 2024, after a month of donation drives, RESPA successfully collected a total of RM34,000 in funds for the deceased and injured officers, where RM13,000 each were handed to the family of the two deceased policemen while the remaining RM8,000 was given to the injured officer, Mohd Hasif.

=== 2024 National Day celebration ===
On 31 August 2024 at National Day celebration in Putrajaya, Mohd Khairul, the police officer who shot dead the attacker, was chosen by Bukit Aman to lead the Rukun Negara recital ceremony and the chanting of "Merdeka" during the celebration.

=== Defamation case ===
On 5 September 2024, a man from Masai, Johor was arrested for defamation after one of the relatives of the deceased policeman Ahmad Azza Fahmi filed a police report over his accusations posted on Facebook which stated that the deceased policemen deserved to die because they often extort money from others. The man, Wan Abd Qayyum Wan Mohd Radzuan, 25, eventually pleaded guilty to the charge of defamation under Section 500 of the Penal Code and was sentenced to 7 days jail and a RM800 fine by the magistrate court on 11 September.

=== Stripping of Singaporean citizenship ===
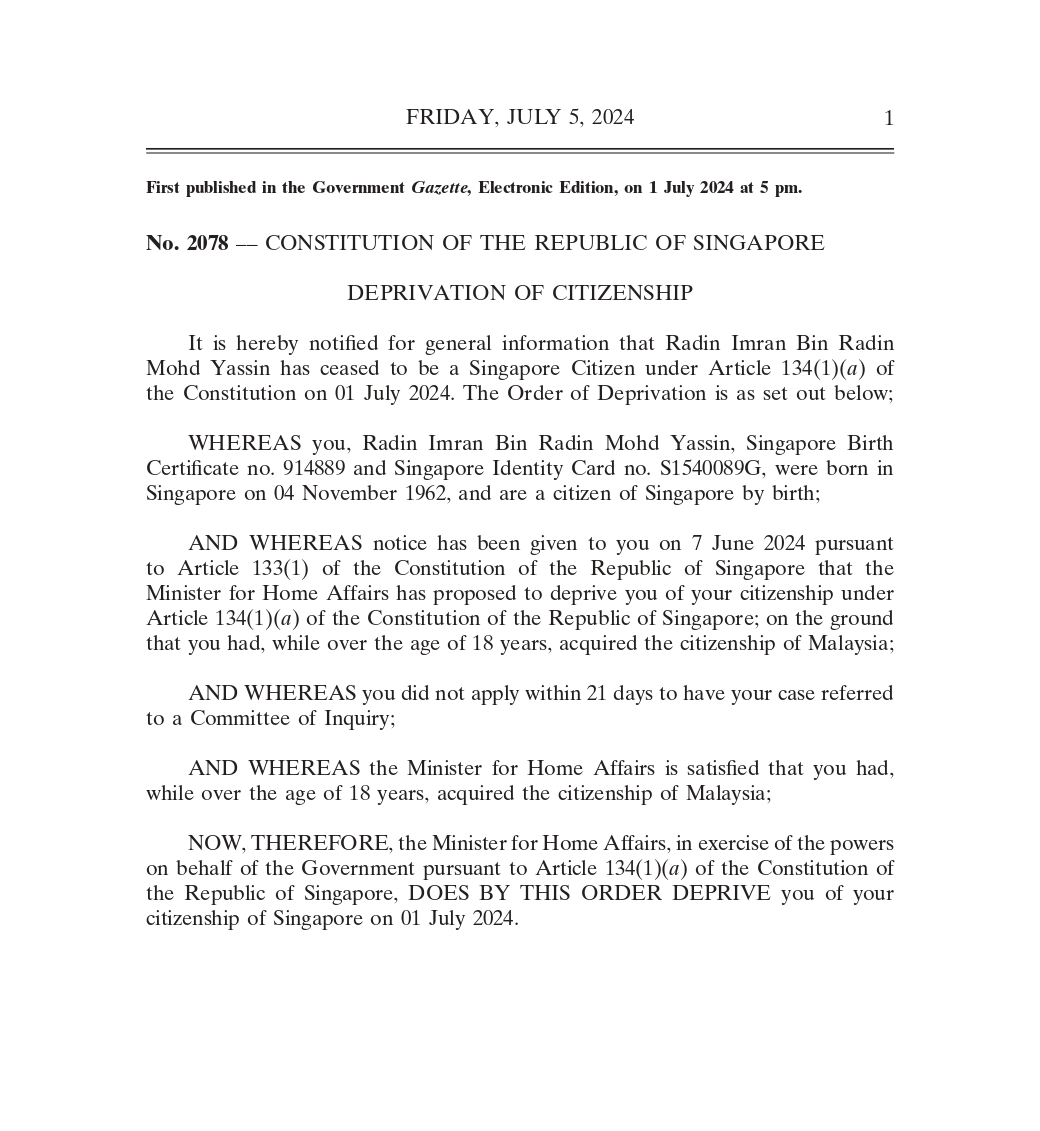
The order to deprive Radin Imran's Singaporean citizenship by the Singaporean government, published on 1 July 2024.

Radin Imran, the father of the perpetrator, was born in Singapore on 4 November 1962 and is a Singapore citizen at birth. He later moved to Malaysia and eventually naturalised as a Malaysian citizen.

On 7 June 2024, less than a month after the attack, the Singaporean government through a notice in its gazette formally proposed to deprive his Singaporean citizenship, citing his double citizenship status, which goes against the Constitution of Singapore. Radin Imran was officially stripped of his Singaporean citizenship on 1 July 2024, after no petition or appeal against the deprivation proposal was received from Radin Imran.

=== Similar incidents ===
The attack was followed by several further incidents, including a death threat to a Democratic Action Party (DAP) member of parliament (MP), and two individuals trying to trespass into the Istana Negara. Another individual was arrested after trying to snatch a police sub-machine gun at the Dato Keramat police station in Penang. None of these subsequent events appear to be related to the Ulu Tiram incident.

== Reactions ==
=== Domestic ===
The Yang di-Pertuan Agong, Sultan Ibrahim Iskandar, offered condolences to the families of the killed police officers.

Prime Minister Anwar Ibrahim said that firm action should be taken against those who attempt to create chaos in Malaysia to the extent of causing deaths. Anwar said he supports all efforts made by the police and asked the public to give their full cooperation to the authorities.

Deputy Prime Minister Ahmad Zahid Hamidi reminded the police to redoubling their efforts and not taking any terrorist threat lightly following disclosure by the Southeast Asian Regional Centre for Counter-Terrorism (SEARCCT) that terrorist groups are using online video games to recruit youth to join their movement.

The Malaysian Islamic Party questioned the security preparedness of the country's civil forces and also requested the Home Ministry to answer on why the police failed to stop the attack from happening.

Home Minister Saifuddin Nasution Ismail affirmed that the attack was carried out by a lone suspect and that they had former terrorist or militant group members under constant monitoring. Due to the attack, the previous procedure of keeping the police stations' main gates opened around the clock had been modified to have the gates shut at 10.00 p.m. each night.

=== International ===
- Indonesia: Following the attack, the Indonesian National Police counter-terrorist unit Detachment 88 imposed tighter monitoring and surveillance of terrorist networks and their activities nationwide.
- Singapore: The Ministry of Foreign Affairs condemned the attack and extended sympathies and condolences to the families of the killed and injured officers. The ministry also advised Singaporeans travelling to Malaysia to take necessary precautions. Authorities also stepped up security measures at the Causeway and Second Link border checkpoints, which resulted in a longer than usual time required to cross the borders.
- United States: US ambassador to Malaysia Edgard Kagan expressed his condolences to the families of the two policemen killed in the incident, stating US willingness to assist the Malaysian authorities in combating terrorism. He added the tragedy serves as a reminder that both US and Malaysia share common interests against terrorism and cannot afford to relax their vigilance.

==== Jemaah Islamiyah ====
Abu Bakar Ba'asyir, the co-founder of the militant group Jemaah Islamiyah (JI), condemned the incident and insisted he personally was not involved in the attack through a video sent by his son to Malaysiakini. He further expressed that whoever accuses or trying to implicate him with the attack are lying and asking them to prove it in front of Allah and advising Muslim youths to not follow hardline ways by easily labelling others as infidels without any reasons based on the Quran. He stated that Islam should be defended only through dawah and prayers, not by killings or bombings.

Subsequently, the whole JI terror group was disbanded by its leaders on 30 June 2024, a month after the attack.

== See also ==
- Bukit Kepong incident — Similar incident in 1950 during the Malayan Emergency, where communist guerillas of the Malayan People's Liberation Army (MPLA) attacked the area surrounding the Bukit Kepong Police Station.
- List of terrorist incidents in 2024
