= Wadi al-Haramiya shooting =

2024 terrorist mass shooting attack in Wadi al-Haramiya

- Part of the Israeli–Palestinian conflict
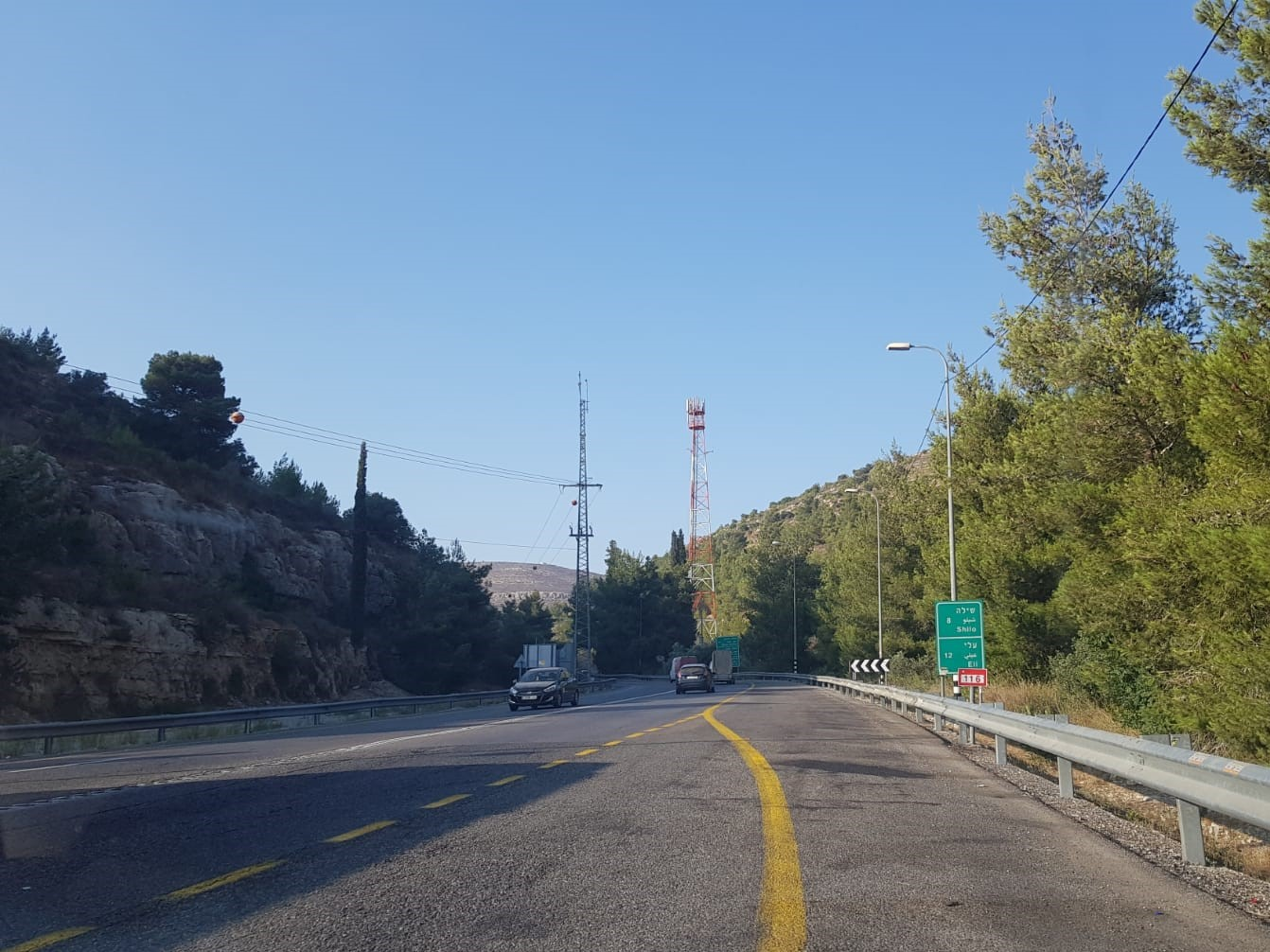
- The junction between Route 60 and Route 465 near Wadi al-Haramiya in 2019

- Location of Wadi al-Haramiya, West Bank
- Native name: הפיגוע בוואדי חרמיה (2024)
- Location: 32.0015°N 35.1512°E; Wadi al-Haramiya, Benjamin Mountains, West Bank
- Date: 7 January 2024
- Attack type: Mass shooting
- Deaths: 3 Civilians
- Injuries: 3, including two gunmen
- No. of participants: 2

On 7 January 2024, a Palestinian gunman opened fire on a civilian vehicle moving along "The British Police cross section" between Route 60 and Route 465 near Wadi al-Haramiya. He targeted a vehicle with an Israeli license plate, killing a 30-year-old Arab-Israeli man from East Jerusalem. A woman, also a resident of East Jerusalem, was severely injured, and died from her wounds two weeks later.

== Attack ==
At 7:27 in the morning of 7 January 2024, a drive-by shooting towards a civilian vehicle with an Israeli registration plate occurred on Wadi al-Haramiya. Half an hour later the victim was identified as Amar Mansur, an Arab-Israeli. The police later declared the attack was a terror attack. Dr. Lara Tannous, a pharmacist from East Jerusalem was seriously injured and died from her injuries on January 25.

== Aftermath ==
Israeli police opened fire at two suspects at a West Bank checkpoint, hitting the two suspects and a police officer, as well as killing a four-year-old Palestinian girl in an adjacent vehicle.

That night, Yamam forces arrested two doctors and a nurse in Ramallah as suspects of helping the shooters.

== See also ==
- Wadi al-Haramiya sniper attack (2002)
