= 2024 Istanbul church shooting =

Anti-Christian attack in Istanbul, Turkey, on January 28th, 2024

Coordinates: 41.16049601°N 29.0419256°E

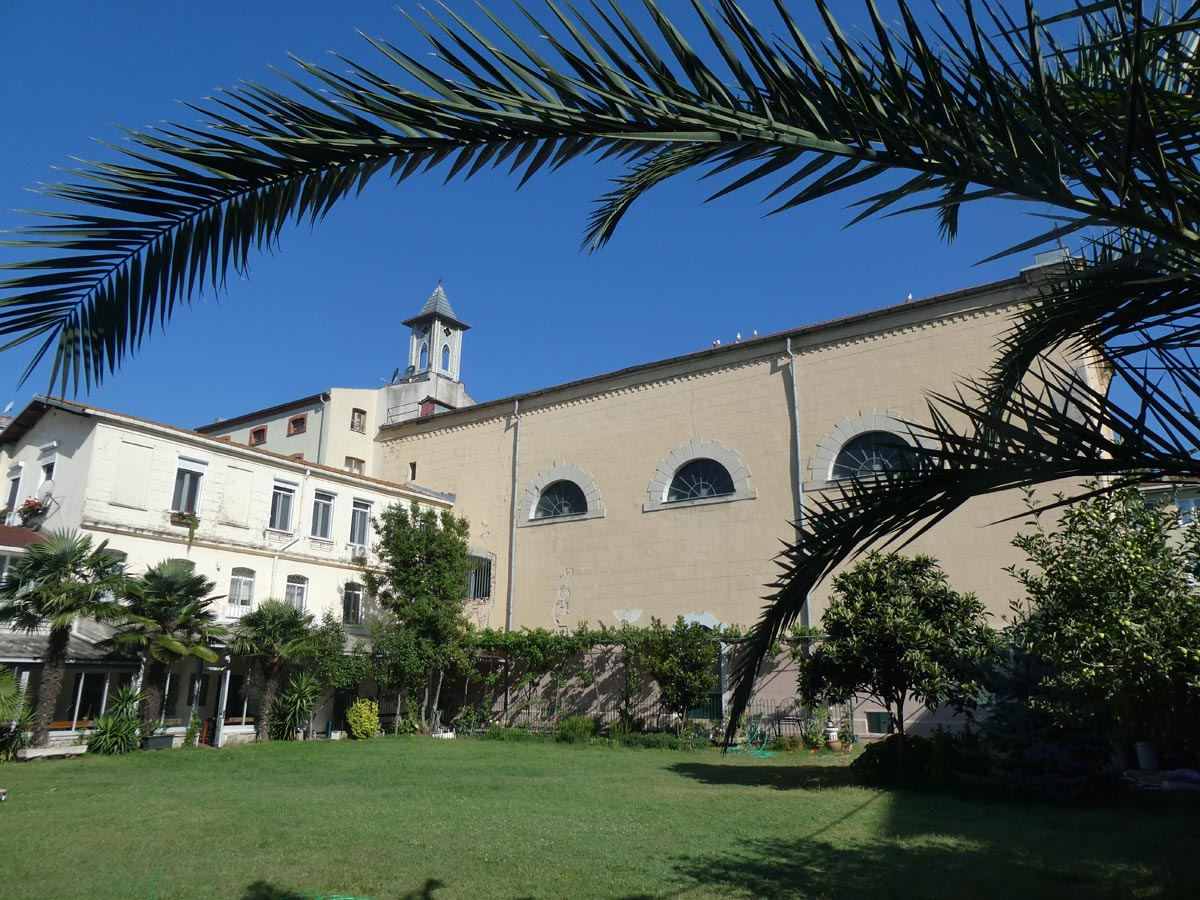
- The Church of Santa Maria in 2023
- Location: Istanbul, Turkey
- Date: 28 January 2024 c. 11:40 a.m. (TRT)
- Target: Church of Santa Maria
- Attack type: Shooting
- Deaths: 1
- Injuries: 1
- Victim: Tuncer Cihan
- Perpetrator: Islamic State
- Assailants: Amirjon Kholiqov and David Tanduev
- Motive: Islamic extremism Anti-Christian sentiment

The 2024 Istanbul church shooting (Turkish: 2024 İstanbul kilise saldırısı), was an attack by the Islamic State on the Church of Santa Maria, a Roman Catholic church located in Istanbul, Turkey, on 28 January 2024.

== Background ==
On 3 January 2024, Turkish authorities arrested 25 suspected members of the Islamic State across the country on suspicion of plotting attacks on churches and synagogues. The attack on 28 January was the group's first attack on a religious target in Turkey, having previously been responsible for other attacks such as the Istanbul nightclub shooting in 2017 and the 2015 Ankara bombings.

The Church of Santa Maria was built in the 19th century and lies on the European side of the Bosphorus in the Büyükdere neighborhood of Sarıyer municipality. It is run by an order of Franciscan friars from Italy.

== Attack ==
On 28 January 2024, at around 11:40 am TRT (8:40 GMT), two masked gunmen entered the church during Sunday Mass and began shooting, killing one person and injuring another. The shooting caused chaos in the church and the attackers fled instantly. The mayor of Sarıyer, Şükrü Genç, said that there were between 35 and 40 people inside the church at the time, and that the attackers left the scene after their weapons jammed, having fired two rounds. Among those in attendance at the service was the Polish consul-general, Witold Lesniak, and his family, who were all unharmed.

The attackers were reported to have driven to church using a car that had been brought from Poland the previous year and had not been used until then. Security footage taken before the attack showed the gunmen, one of whom was wearing sunglasses, wearing black ski masks while concealing their hands in their pockets. The suspected attackers were arrested by police while fleeing the church. Ministry of the Interior Ali Yerlikaya later confirmed that the attackers were a Tajikistani citizen Amirjon Kholiqov and Russian citizen David Tanduev, who were both members of the Islamic State. The Islamic State claimed responsibility for the attack on Telegram, saying that it was part of its leader's call to kill Jews and Christians everywhere. Another Russian, Viskhan Soltamatov, was arrested on 17 September 2024 and is the suspected mastermind behind the attack.

The governor of Istanbul, Davut Gül, said that the lone fatality was a Turkish national, and that no one else was injured in the attack. The fatality was later identified as a 52-year-old man by the name of Tuncer Cihan, who was described by his nephew as "a mentally disabled individual who had no connection to politics or organizations" and that he had visited the church because someone had invited him there, before he became a "victim of fate." However, another relative of Cihan stated that he was seeking to convert to Christianity but had not yet been baptized. A lawyer for the church said that Cihan belonged to the Alevi community.

== Aftermath ==
Flowers and candles were laid at the church following the attack, while a Turkish flag was hung over its door. Church officials said that masses would resume on 1 February.

=== Reactions ===
==== Domestic ====
Police sealed off the streets leading to the church, while a ban on media coverage of the attack was ordered by Turkish authorities. President Recep Tayyip Erdoğan phoned consul Lesniak and the priest of the church, Reverend Anton Bulai, and gave his condolences, and stated that "necessary steps are being taken to catch the perpetrators as soon as possible."

Interior minister Ali Yerlikaya said that "we will never tolerate those who try to disrupt the peace of our country — terrorists, their collaborators, both national and international criminal groups, and those who aim at our unity and solidarity." Yerlikaya added that 47 people had been detained following police raids on 30 locations as part of the investigation into the shooting.

The mayor of Istanbul, Ekrem İmamoğlu expressed his support for religious minorities in the city and assured them that "there are no minorities in this city or this country, we are all actual citizens."

==== International ====
Pope Francis expressed his "closeness to the community of the Santa Maria Draperis Church in Istanbul" at the end of his weekly Angelus prayer in Saint Peter's Square in Vatican City.

Italian foreign minister Antonio Tajani expressed his "condolences and firm condemnation" of the attack, and stated that he is "certain that the Turkish authorities will arrest those responsible."

== See also ==
- Catholicism in Turkey
- Istanbul nightclub shooting
- Terrorism in Turkey
- Turkey–Islamic State conflict
- Murder of Luigi Padovese
- Zirve Publishing House murders
- Attempted assassination of Pope John Paul II
