= 2024 attack on the Israeli embassy in Belgrade =

Terrorist incident in Serbia

Attack on the Israeli embassy in Belgrade
- Belgrade (Belgrade)
- Location: Belgrade, Serbia
- Date: 29 June 2024; Around 11:00 AM (UTC +1)
- Target: Israeli embassy
- Attack type: Crossbow attack
- Deaths: 1 (the perpetrator)
- Injuries: 1 gendarme
- Perpetrators: Miloš Žujović, Islamic State (claimed responsibility)
- Motive: "Israelis killing Muslims" (in the Gaza war); ISIS inspired terrorism

An attack on the Israeli embassy in Belgrade, the capital of Serbia, took place on 29 June 2024. It was carried out by Miloš Žujović, a supporter of the Islamic State. Žujović, a convert to Islam, wounded a Serbian gendarme with a crossbow. The gendarme returned fire and killed him.

== Attack ==
The Israeli embassy in Belgrade is located in the wealthy Dedinje neighborhood. According to interior minister Ivica Dačić, the attacker approached a small building near the embassy around 11:00, asking about a museum. The attacker then opened the door to the small building and fired a crossbow at a Serbian gendarme guarding the embassy, wounding him in the neck. The officer returned fire, killing the assailant.

== Perpetrators and aftermath ==
Miloš Žujović, the perpetrator

The perpetrator was identified as Miloš Žujović (Serbian Cyrillic: Милош Жујовић; born 1999), also known by his Islamic name Salahudin, a local of Mladenovac who had converted to Islam and joined the Wahhabi movement. After converting to Islam, Žujović moved to the Muslim-majority city of Novi Pazar with his wife who is from Plav, Montenegro. Interior minister Ivica Dačić branded the incident as a terrorist attack, declaring a red threat level from terrorism. The same day, an alleged co-perpetrator and a known radical Islamist Igor Despotović was arrested in Belgrade. As reported, Despotović had a long and continuous communication with Žujović and was already previously convicted for inciting terrorist attacks.

Prior to the attack, Žujović recorded a video message for his wife, mentioning "Israelis killing Muslims", alluding to the Gaza war.

Following the attack, Serbian president Aleksandar Vučić visited the wounded gendarme Miloš Jevremović in the hospital and condemned the attack. Vučić stated the authorities are searching for more co-perpetrators.

The police operation continued in the following days, with the arrest of Kemal Begović from Novi Pazar, and Haris Šund, a citizen of Bosnia and Herzegovina, suspected of having connections with Islamic extremists. It was reported that among other things, Islamic State symbols and a video message pledging allegiance to that organization belonging to the arrested have been found.

On July 4, 2024, the Islamic State-controlled newspaper al-Naba published its 450th issue where they took credit for the attack on the Israeli embassy, featuring an image of Miloš Žujović pledging allegiance to the Islamic State, titling the release “They are us and we are them”.

On 18 August, 2024, Senad Ramović Becan, who had been on the run since the attack as well as being charged in connection to it, was killed in a shootout with officers of the Special Anti-Terrorist Unit during an attempt arrest according to Serbian authorities. According to Serbian authorities, he was a Wahhabi who had rented an apartment to Žujović, who attacked the embassy, as well as having played a key role in his radicalization. Previously, in 2007, he had been arrested after an armed confrontation with authorities along with 14 accomplices and two years later sentenced to 13,5 years in prison for planning acts of terrorism.
