= Mahamadou Sana =

- Sana in 2026

Minister of Security of Burkina Faso
- Incumbent
- Assumed office August 1, 2024
- Preceded by: Emile Zerbo

Deputy Director-General of the National Intelligence Agency of Burkina Faso
- In office October 2022 – August 1, 2024

Personal details
- Born: October 24, 1983 (age 42) Bouake, Ivory Coast
- Education: University of Ouagadougou

Mahamadou Sana is an Ivorian-Burkinabe politician who has served as the Minister of Security since 2024.

== Biography ==
Sana was born on October 24, 1983, in Bouaké, Ivory Coast. He moved to Burkina Faso in high school, and completed his primary schooling in Pouytenga. Between 2003 and 2007, he attended the University of Ouagadougou and received a master's degree in economic sciences. He first became a police officer in 2009, working his way up to head of police intelligence in 2011 and then chief of police for Ouagadougou-Donsin Airport in 2015 until 2017. From March to October 25, 2022, Sana served as Minister-Delegate to the Minister of Territorial Administration, serving in security alongside Boukare Zoungrana and then Emile Zerbo.

After the September 2022 Burkina Faso coup d'état that brought Ibrahim Traoré to power, Sana was promoted to deputy director-general of the Burkinabe spy agency ANR alongside Oumarou Yabre.

Since August 1, 2024, Sana has been Minister of Security, having served as Deputy Minister of Security prior to his promotion and succeeding Zerbo. As minister, Sana has been a staunch ally of President Ibrahim Traoré with the primary job of undermining domestic opposition and threats to Traore's rule. This included an alleged April 2025 coup plot which Sana said was sponsored by the Ivory Coast and a January 2026 coup plot that involved $125,000 of foreign funding. Alongside Yabre, Sana has cracked down on European and Western aid workers and facilities in Burkina Faso.
