= Nushki shooting =

Abduction and Shooting in Nushki, Pakistan

Nushki Incident
- Date: 12 April 2024
- Venue: Noshki district
- Location: Balochistan, Pakistan
- Cause: Suspected ethnic separatist militants Indian spy-related hatred
- Target: Passengers from Punjab
- Deaths: 9

The Nushki incident took place on 12 April 2024 in the Nushki district of Balochistan province of Pakistan, where armed attackers kidnapped 9 passengers and later killed them. The victims, all men from Punjab, were traveling in a bus from Quetta to Taftan when the assailants stopped, identified and took them away. Their bodies were later found under a bridge, each shot to death.

== Incident ==
On the late night of Friday 12 April 2024, a bus from Quetta to Taftan was intercepted by armed assailants. The attackers checked the identity cards of the passengers and kidnapped nine of them. The victims, all men, belonged to Mandi Bahauddin, Wazirabad and Gujranwala areas of Punjab. Their bodies were later found under a bridge near a hill, all shot to death.

Balochistan Liberation Army (BLA) in a press release claimed responsibility of the killings and also claimed that upon identifying the nine individuals who were killed, were identified as officials of Pakistani intelligence agencies and multiple identity cards and a significant quantity of SIM cards were found in their possession.

== Reactions ==
Prime Minister Shahbaz Sharif strongly condemned the attack and called it an incident of terrorism. He expressed his condolences to the families of the victims and assured that the culprits and their facilitators will be punished.

Pakistan People's Party (PPP) Chairman Bilawal Bhutto Zardari has also strongly condemned the incident. He demanded from the Chief Minister of Balochistan that the killers of innocent people should be brought to justice.
