= 2024 Bamyan shooting =

Terrorist attack in Afghanistan

- Part of Afghan conflict and terrorism in Afghanistan
- Location: Bamyan, Afghanistan
- Date: 17 May 2024
- Attack type: Mass shooting
- Deaths: 7
- Injuries: 7
- Perpetrator: Islamic State – Khorasan Province
- No. of participants: 4 (per Taliban government)
- Motive: Islamic extremism

On 17 May 2024, a group of foreign tourists were attacked by gunmen in a public market in Bamyan Province, Afghanistan. The attack happened during the daytime. It caused panic among local residents and visiting tourists.

Taliban-led Interior Ministry spokesman Abdul Matin Qani said that three Spaniards and three Afghans were killed, including a Taliban member. Eight other people were injured, including one Lithuanian, one Norwegian, one Australian and one Spaniard.

The Islamic State – Khorasan Province (IS-KP) claimed responsibility two days later. The shooting raised new concerns about the security situation in Afghanistan under Taliban rule. It also highlighted the ongoing threat of terrorism in the region.

== See also ==
- List of terrorist incidents linked to Islamic State – Khorasan Province
