= Church of Saint Mary of Büyükdere, Istanbul =

Catholic church in Istanbul, Turkey

Church of Santa Maria, Istanbul
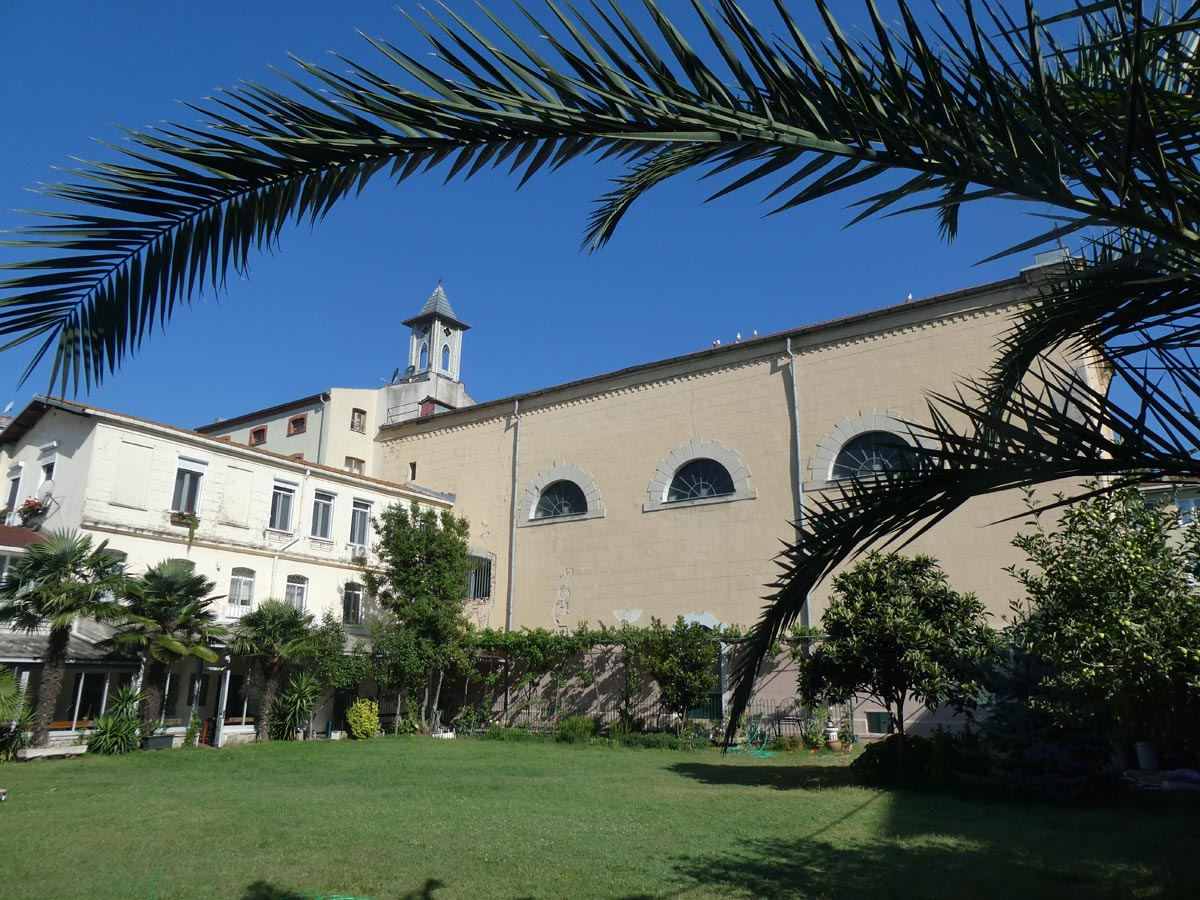
- Church of Santa Maria in Istanbul

- Location of the church in Istanbul

Religion
- Affiliation: Roman Catholic
- Diocese: Büyükdere, Sarıyer
- Province: Istanbul
- Year consecrated: 1864; 162 years ago
- Status: active

Location
- Country: Turkey
- Coordinates: 41.16056°N 29.04194°E

Architecture
- Architect: Gaspare Fossati (1809–1883)
- Completed: 1864; 162 years ago

The Church of Santa Maria (Turkish: Meryem Ana Doğuş Kilisesi or Santa Maria İtalyan Latin Katolik Kilisesi; Italian: Convento della Natività della Beata Vergine Maria di Büyükdere) is a Catholic church in Istanbul, Turkey.

== History ==
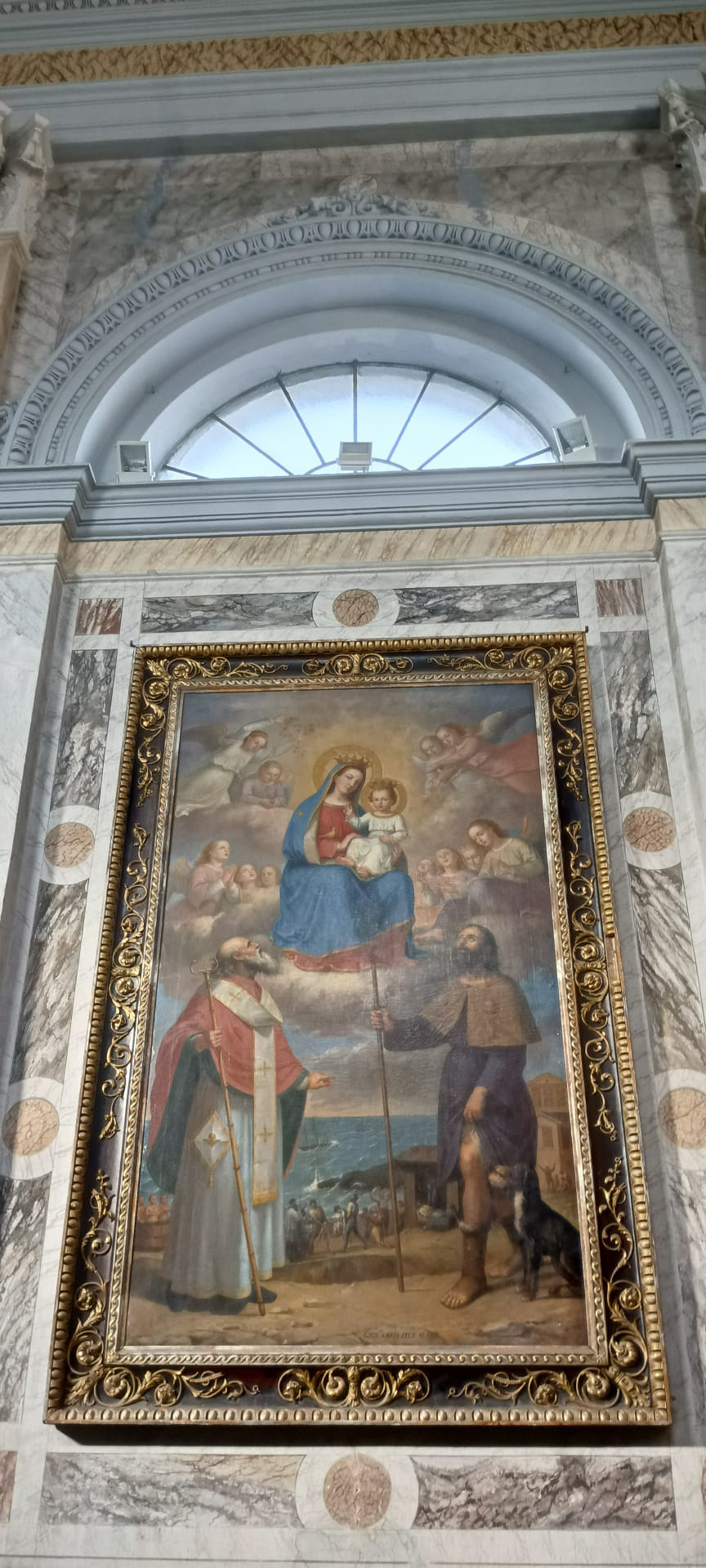
Oil painting in the church depicting a scene from the Bible

Located in the Büyükdere quarter of Sarıyer district in northern Istanbul, the church was founded by Franciscan priests, and dedicated to Virgin Mary. The construction of the church began in 1864, and it was opened to worship in 1866. The building was designed by the Swiss architect Gaspare Fossati (1809–1883) as a two-storey, basilica-plan church in neoclassical style. The altar, tabernacle and interior walls of the church feature numerous large-sized oil paintings in Marian art with depictions of stories and descriptions from the Bible. The church organ, which was built by Rieger Orgelbau, and was initially brought in 1875 for the chapel of the French Lycée Notre Dame de Sion Istanbul, was installed in 1914.

== Armed attack ==
On 28 January 2024, two masked men entered the church during the Sunday morning worship, and opened fire on people around 11:40 local time. It was reported that around 35 to 40 people were present in the church, and these threw themselves on the ground after the shooting began. One man, 52 year old Tuncer Cihan was killed in the shooting. The motive for the attack was not evident. According to a statement of Minister of the Interior Ali Yerlikaya, it is considered that the suspects are members of the terrorist organization Islamic State, being one of Tajikistani and the other of Russian origin.
