= Dominica–Tajikistan relations =

- Dominica: Tajikistan

Dominica–Tajikistan relations refers to the bilateral relations between Dominica and Tajikistan. The two nations have diplomatic relations through their joint membership in the United Nations. On 13 April 2011, diplomatic relations were officially entered into by both countries' ambassadors to the UN in New York. These were Dominica's Vince Henderson and Tajikistan's Sirodjidin Aslov. On 11 February 2025, representatives of both countries agreed on mutual exemption of visa requirements. Citizens of both countries will be allowed to remain in the respective country for 90 days. It is seen as a reflection of a broader strategy in Tajik foreign relations of expanding "islands of friendship around the world".
