= Readovka =

Russian online news resource

- Type: News website
- Founder: Alexey Kostylev
- Editor-in-chief: Alexey Kostylev
- Founded: 2014; 12 years ago
- Language: Russian
- Headquarters: Roslavl Smolensk Oblast, Russia
- Sister newspapers: Ready, Glavnoye v gorode, Readovka67
- Website: readovka.news

Readovka is a Russian online news resource, founded in 2011 in Smolensk as a public page on VKontakte. In 2014, its owner created the Readovka website, which at that time specialised in regional news. In 2017 it started to cover events in Russia and internationally. The Readovka media holding includes the "Ready" communication agency, as well as a group of regional projects united by the "Main in the City" brand.

== History ==
In 2011 Alexey Kostylev created a public page on VKontakte, "Important in Smolensk", about the city. In 2014, Kostylev set up the Readovka website, focussing on events in the Smolensk Oblast region. The name "Readovka" comes from Readovsky Park in Smolensk and from the English word "read". On 9 February 2017, it was registered as an online news resource.

In 2017 Kostylev tried to move the editorial office from Smolensk to Moscow; this failed, but Kostylev separated the editorial offices with a separate division in the capital. In November 2020, the head office was moved to Moscow. At the same time, the company started publishing Readovka67, with news about events in Smolensk and the Smolensk Oblast. The media holding also owns the Readovka.by publication about Vitebsk (Belarus), the Ready PR agency and the Readovka.space website.

In 2022, a division was launched to develop a network of local projects united by the Main in the City brand. As of June 2022, platforms have been set up in cities including Sochi, Donetsk, and Kherson. The main platform of the Readovka publication is the Telegram channel of the same name, founded in 2018. In March 2022 the Readovka team set up a Telegram channel "Readovka Explains", where staff briefly answer questions about current events, including in Ukraine and internationally in connection with the 2022 Russian invasion of Ukraine. In April 2022, the publication crossed the mark of one million subscribers, and, according to the Tgstat service, is one of the five most cited media in the country.

According to the Polish TV channel Belsat TV, in March 2022, some of Yevgeny Prigozhin’s employees became employees of Readovka.

A number of Russian opposition and some Western publications classify Readovka as a pro-Kremlin resource. However, Kostylev denies this, stating that Readovka "remains in line with independent journalism".

In the aftermath of the Crocus City Hall attack, Readovka was one of the Russian media outlets that began sending the message that "not all Tajiks are terrorists" and "disturbing the interethnic harmony in Russia and making us hate each other is the goal of our real enemies, Ukraine and the West". However, many Russian nationalists accused Readovka of becoming a "Tajik media outlet".

== Litigations and blockings ==
In 2020, Shkolnik-UZ LLC filed a lawsuit due to the publication on Readovka's Telegram channel of an article about Shkolnik-UZ's possible connection with the poisoning of a student at Moscow School No. 1206.

On 7 July 2021, Readovka was compelled by the Vidnovsky City Court of the Moscow Oblast to block its website temporarily. Readovka said that this was because the deputy of the United Russia party, Dmitry Sablin, had complained about a series of articles on possible undeclared income and Sablin's participation in the seizure of the "Lenin State Farm" and the Kolkhoz-stud farm named after Maksim Gorky in the Moscow Oblast, posted on the site on 28 January 2020. On 30 August 2021, Roskomnadzor entered a page on the Readovka.ru website into the register of information prohibited in Russia. In the same year, the publication moved to the Readovka.news domain. On 3 September 2021, after deleting seven articles about Sablin, Roskomnadzor unblocked the publication’s website.

On February 26, 2022, Roskomnadzor blocked the Readovka.news website due to an article with the headline "Roskomnadzor decided to block all Telegram in Russia due to Readovka’s post about the lawlessness of migrants in the Kaluga Oblast".

== Criticism ==
In 2021, Meduza journalist Ivan Golunov accused Readovka of contributing to the closure of the Anti-Corruption Foundation (FBK). According to Golunov, Readovka journalists turned to FBK lawyer Lyubov Sobol for help in investigating the case of an outbreak of dysentery in Moscow in 2018. After the publication of the investigation materials on the FBK website, the Moskovsky Shkolnik food plant filed a lawsuit against FBK. The fund lost the case, and its accounts, after a series of guilty verdicts and large fines in other cases, were blocked by a court decision, after which the fund announced its closure. Kostylev denied the accusations, saying that before turning to Sobol for help, Readovka had approached other media outlets, including Meduza, and been refused.

On 8 April 2022, Readovka announced a boycott of Dmitry Peskov, press secretary of the President of Russia, due to his positive remarks about TV presenter Ivan Urgant who left Russia after the invasion of Ukraine.

On 11 April 2022, the "We Can Explain" Telegram channel published an article about changes in the editorial office of Readovka since the outbreak of hostilities in Ukraine. According to the dismissed employees, the publication previously had a Russian nationalist bias. It had reported on the actions of political activists, but after February 24, it switched to military propaganda.

In April 2022, Readovka reported that at a closed briefing by the Russian Ministry of Defense, the Ministry had said that 13,414 Russian soldiers had been killed during the Russian invasion of Ukraine. Readovka later removed the report. On April 22, 2022, the editors of Readovka published an official announcement that the community on VKontakte had been hacked and that the source of the hack had been identified. The editors said that the hacking was carried out by a former employee, and that the reported briefing had not taken place.
