= Visa policy of Tajikistan =

Policy on permits required to enter Tajikistan

Visitors to Tajikistan must obtain a visa from one of the Tajikistan diplomatic missions unless they are citizens of one of the visa-exempt countries, or citizens who may obtain a visa on arrival, or citizens eligible for an e-Visa.

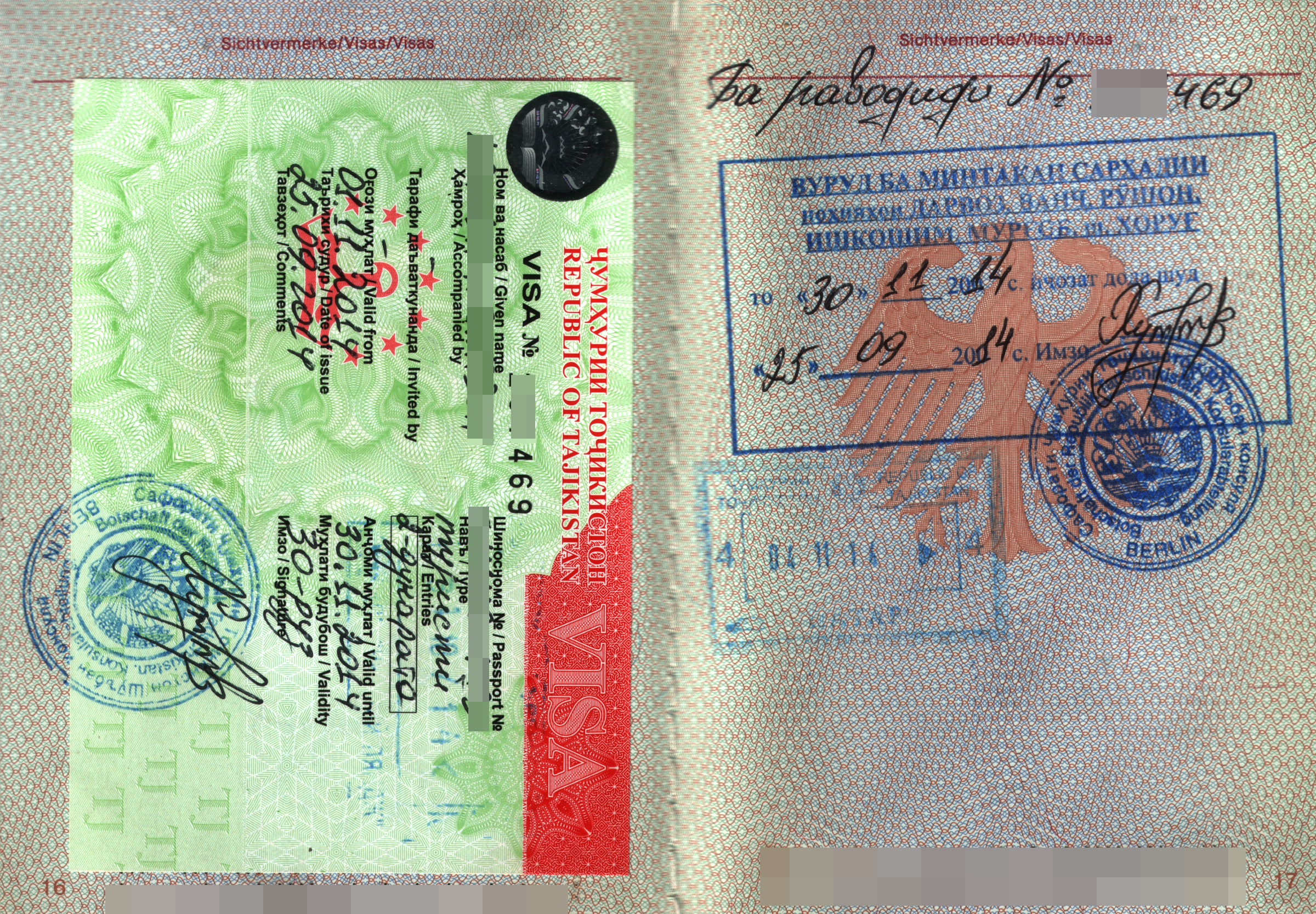
Tajikistani tourist visa along with Gorno-Badakhshan Permit

Tajikistan's visa and other migration policies are also implemented in accordance with the mobility rights arrangements within the Commonwealth of Independent States.

== Visa policy map ==
Visa policy of Tajikistan Tajikistan Visa not required (unlimited period) Visa not required (90 days) Visa not required (30 days) Visa on arrival / eVisa eVisa Visa required

== Visa exemption ==
=== Ordinary passports ===
Citizens of the following countries may enter Tajikistan without a visa for the following period:

Unlimited period

- Belarus
- Georgia
- Kazakhstan
- Kyrgyzstan
- Russia

90 days

- Armenia
- Azerbaijan
- Dominica
- Ukraine

90 days within any 180 days

- Moldova

30 days

- All European Union member states

- Andorra
- Argentina
- Australia
- Bahamas
- Bahrain
- Bosnia and Herzegovina
- Brazil
- Brunei
- Canada
- Chile
- Costa Rica
- Cuba
- Dominican Republic
- Ecuador
- Iceland
- Indonesia
- Jamaica
- Japan
- Jordan
- Kuwait
- Liechtenstein
- Malaysia
- Maldives
- Marshall Islands
- Mexico
- Monaco
- Mongolia
- Montenegro
- New Zealand
- Norway
- Oman
- Philippines
- Qatar
- Saint Kitts and Nevis
- Saint Lucia
- Saint Vincent and the Grenadines
- San Marino
- Saudi Arabia
- Serbia
- Singapore
- Solomon Islands
- South Korea
- Sri Lanka
- Switzerland
- Thailand
- United Arab Emirates
- United States
- Uzbekistan
- Vatican City

30 days within any 90 days

- Iran

Date of visa changes

Citizens of Armenia, Azerbaijan, Belarus, Georgia, Kazakhstan, Kyrgyzstan, Moldova, Russia, and Ukraine have never required a visa to enter Tajikistan.

- 19 March 2018: Uzbekistan (resumed)
- 1 January 2022: Argentina, Australia, Austria, Bahrain, Belgium, Brunei, Canada, Chile, Croatia, Cuba, Czechia, Denmark, Dominicana, Ecuador, Estonia, Finland, France, Germany, Greece, Hungary, Iceland, Indonesia, Italy, Jamaica, Japan, Jordan, Kuwait, Latvia, Liechtenstein, Lithuania, Luxembourg, Malaysia, Maldives, Monaco, Netherlands, New Zealand, Norway, Philippines, Poland, Portugal, Qatar, Saudi Arabia, Singapore, South Korea, Spain, Sri Lanka, Sweden, Switzerland, Thailand, Turkey, United Arab Emirates, United States of America
- 1 May 2024: Andorra, Bahamas, Bosnia and Herzegovina, Brazil, Bulgaria, Costa Rica, Cyprus, Ireland, Malta, Marshall Islands, Mexico, Mongolia, Montenegro, Oman, Romania, Saint Kitts and Nevis, Saint Lucia, Saint Vincent and the Grenadines, San Marino, Serbia, Slovakia, Slovenia, Solomon Islands, Vatican City
- 10 August 2024: Iran
- 17 July 2025: Dominica

Cancelled:

- 10 June 1999: Turkmenistan
- 11 September 2000: Uzbekistan (was resumed in 2018)
- 20 April 2024: Turkey

In addition, citizens of China holding a passport endorsed "for public affairs" may enter Tajikistan without a visa for a maximum stay of 30 days.

==== Visa exemption for elderly visitors ====
Citizens of the following countries who are aged 55 and over may enter Tajikistan without a visa for a maximum stay of 14 days:

- Albania
- Algeria
- Barbados
- China
- Fiji
- Laos
- Lebanon
- Madagascar
- Morocco
- Nicaragua
- North Macedonia
- Panama
- Tunisia
- Vanuatu
- Vietnam

=== Non-ordinary passports ===
Holders of diplomatic passports of Afghanistan, Jordan, Turkmenistan, Uzbekistan and holders of diplomatic or official/service passports of Brunei, China, Hungary, India, Iran, Italy, Morocco, North Korea, Pakistan, Palestine, Romania, Saudi Arabia, Serbia, Singapore, South Korea, Turkey may enter Tajikistan without a visa.

=== Future changes ===
Tajikistan has signed visa exemption agreements with the following countries, but they have not yet entered into force:

Country	Passports	Agreement signed on
Seychelles	All	September 2026
Venezuela	Diplomatic, service	September 2022

== Visa on arrival ==
Citizens of the following countries may obtain a visa on arrival at Dushanbe International Airport for the following period:

2 months

- Morocco

45 days

- Algeria
- Egypt
- Lebanon
- South Africa
- Tunisia
- Turkmenistan
- Venezuela
- Vietnam

== Electronic visa (e-Visa) ==
Tajikistan launched an e-Visa on 1 June 2016.

The e-Visa may be used at any border crossing, and is granted for tourism and business. Along with an e-Visa, visitors can choose to purchase a permit to visit the Gorno-Badakhshan Autonomous Region for US$20 through the same e-Visa application.

Citizens of the following countries and territories may obtain a single or multiple entry e-Visa for $30 or $50 respectively for a maximum stay of 60 days within 90 days:

- All European Union member states

- Albania
- Algeria
- Andorra
- Antigua and Barbuda
- Argentina
- Australia
- Bahamas
- Bahrain
- Bangladesh
- Barbados
- Belize
- Benin
- Bhutan
- Bolivia
- Bosnia and Herzegovina
- Brazil
- Brunei
- Burkina Faso
- Cape Verde
- Cambodia
- Cameroon
- Canada
- Chile
- China
- Colombia
- Congo
- Costa Rica
- Cuba
- Dominican Republic
- Ecuador
- Egypt
- El Salvador
- Fiji
- Ghana
- Grenada
- Guatemala
- Guyana
- Haiti
- Honduras
- Hong Kong
- Iceland
- India
- Indonesia
- Iran
- Israel
- Jamaica
- Japan
- Jordan
- Kenya
- Kuwait
- Laos
- Lebanon
- Liechtenstein
- Macau
- Madagascar
- Malaysia
- Maldives
- Marshall Islands
- Mauritius
- Mexico
- Monaco
- Mongolia
- Montenegro
- Morocco
- New Zealand
- North Macedonia
- Nicaragua
- Norway
- Oman
- Pakistan
- Palestine
- Panama
- Papua New Guinea
- Paraguay
- Peru
- Philippines
- Qatar
- Saint Kitts and Nevis
- Saint Lucia
- Saint Vincent and the Grenadines
- San Marino
- Saudi Arabia
- Senegal
- Serbia
- Seychelles
- Singapore
- Solomon Islands
- South Africa
- South Korea
- Sri Lanka
- Sudan
- Suriname
- Switzerland
- Taiwan
- Tanzania
- Thailand
- Trinidad and Tobago
- Tunisia
- Turkmenistan
- Uganda
- United Arab Emirates
- United Kingdom
- United States
- Uruguay
- Uzbekistan
- Vanuatu
- Vatican City
- Venezuela
- Vietnam

Stateless persons who were citizens of Tajikistan may also obtain an e-Visa.

== Online visa application ==
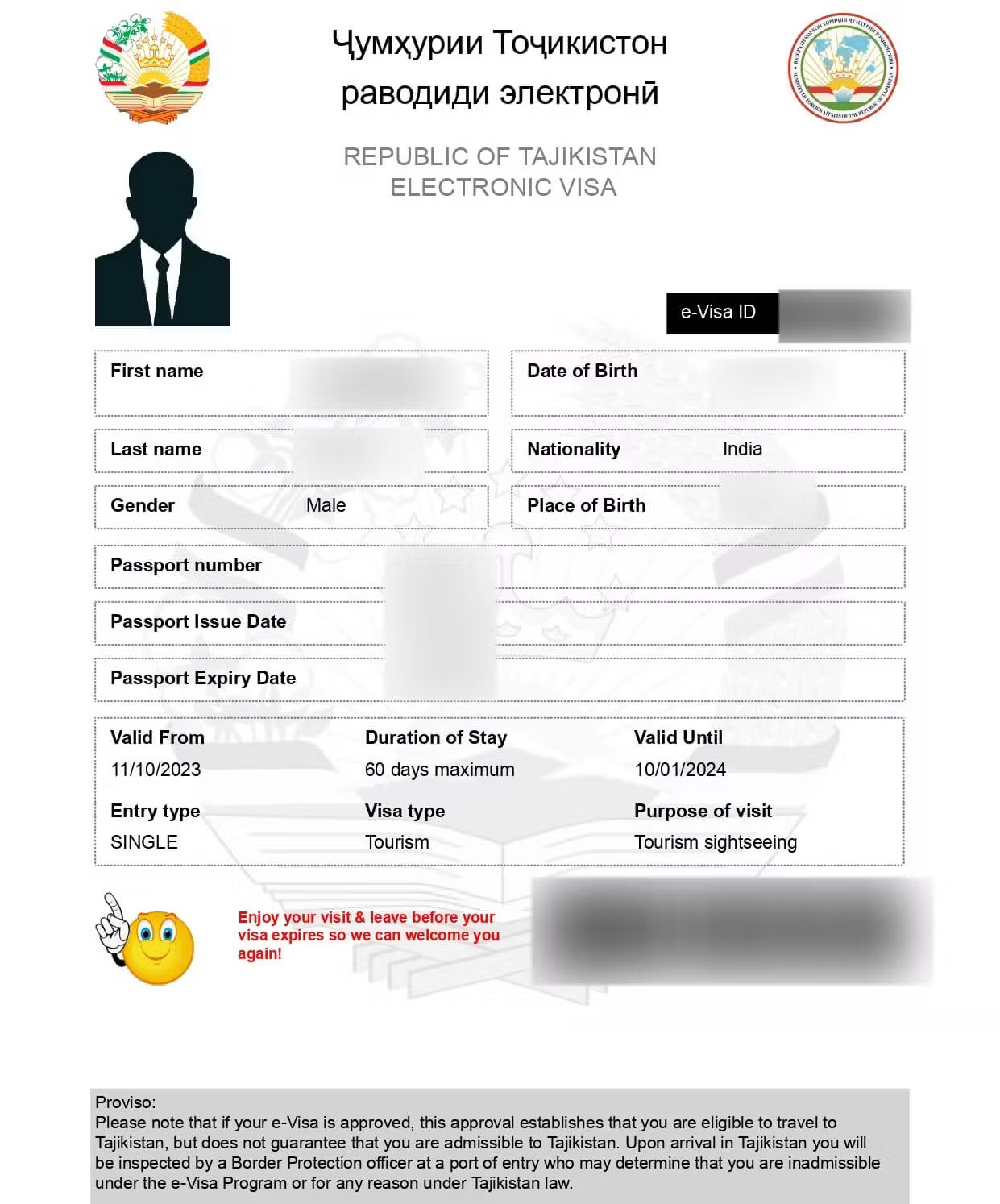
Sample of Tajikistani eVisa

Citizens of any country may apply for a regular visa online. If the visa application is successful, the visa may be obtained either from the Tajikistan embassy or consulate or on arrival at Dushanbe International Airport.

Citizens of Yemen may apply for a visa online, which will allow them to travel to Dushanbe International Airport and obtain a visa on arrival which is valid for a maximum stay of 45 days.

== Gorno-Badakhshan ==
A special permit is required to visit the regions within the Gorno-Badakhshan Autonomous Province. OVIR permit required (15+5 Tajikistani Somoni) and another special permit (free of charge) is required for Lake Sarez.

== Admission restrictions ==
Tajikistan does not recognize the passports of Abkhazia, Kosovo, Northern Cyprus, the Sahrawi Republic, Somaliland, South Ossetia and Transnistria.

== Visitor statistics ==
Year	Visitors
1992—1996	No data
1997	▲2,100
1998	▲3,200
1999	▲3,500
2000	▲7,700
2001	▼5,200
2002—2007	No data
2008	▲325,000
2009	▼207,000
2010	▼160,000
2011	▲183,000
2012	▲244,000
2013	▼208,000
2014	▲213,700
2015	▲463,700
2016	▼325,000
2017	▲430,900
2018	▲ More 1,155,000
2019	▲ More 1,320,000
2020	▼ More 410,000
2021	▲ More 517,000

Most visitors arriving in Tajikistan were from the following countries of nationality:

Country	2021	2020	2019	2017	2016	2015	2014
Uzbekistan	▲305,411	▼271,118	▲853,634	▲733,153	▲254,481	▲219,255	▼158,928
Russia	▲136,319	▼54,971	▲212,062	▲157,910			
Kyrgyzstan	▲60,788	▼45,922	▲116,277	68,788			
Afghanistan	▲15,112	▼6,122	▲22,856	8,827			
Kazakhstan	▲14,300	▼9,687	▲20,930	13,933			
China	▲4,006	▼3,187	▲20,200	8,059			
Turkey	▲3,466	▼2,750	▲6,607	4,075			
United States	▲3,221	▼2,456	▲6,631	3,418			
Belarus	▲2,588	▼871	▲2,459	1,979			
Iran	▲2,576	▼533					
India	2,551	No data	▲3,808	1,038			
Ukraine	1,967	No data	▲3,427	1,613			
South Korea	1,448	No data	▲1,561	715			
Germany	1,440	No data	▲3,987	2,256			
Pakistan	1,309						
France	1,266	No data	▲2,015	1,252			
Japan	1,220	No data	▲1,814	565			
United Kingdom	1,088	No data	▲2,533	1,440			
Italy	1,044	No data	▲1,899	644			
Canada	831	No data	▲1,470	768			
Azerbaijan	385						
Armenia	266						
Moldova	219	No data	▲1,562	1,010			
Turkmenistan	▲201	▼135	▲2,341	1,257			
Other countries	More 44,000						

== See also ==
- Visa requirements for Tajik citizens
