= Gavrilov Blood Center =

Hospital in Russia

The Gavrilov Blood Center (Russian: Центр крови Гаврилова) of the Moscow Health Department is a medical institution in Moscow, Russia specializing in transfusion of blood and its components. Named after O. K. Gavrilov, it is Russia's largest transfusion centre.

It has two premises, at 14 Polikarpova Street and 31 Bakinskaya Street respectively.
