= Tajik passport =

Passport issued to Tajik nationals

- The front cover of a post-2010 Tajik biometric passport
- Type: Passport
- Issued by: Tajikistan
- First issued: February 1, 2010
- Purpose: Identification
- Eligibility: Tajik citizenship

1993 Tajikistan Passport

2005 Tajikistan Passport

Tajik passports (Tajik: Тоҷик Шиноснома, Toçik Şinosnoma) are issued to citizens of the Republic of Tajikistan to enable them to travel outside the country. It is the international proof of identity of any Tajik citizen.

== Biometric passport ==
On February 1, 2010, biometric passports were introduced in Tajikistan. Approximately 100,000 blank biometric passports, including 20,000 blank diplomatic biometric passports, 20,000 blank service biometric passports and 60,000 blank ordinary biometric passports were printed. The chip and antenna are not easily visually recognisable, but their presence is indicated using the ICAO biometric passport symbol at the bottom of the front cover.

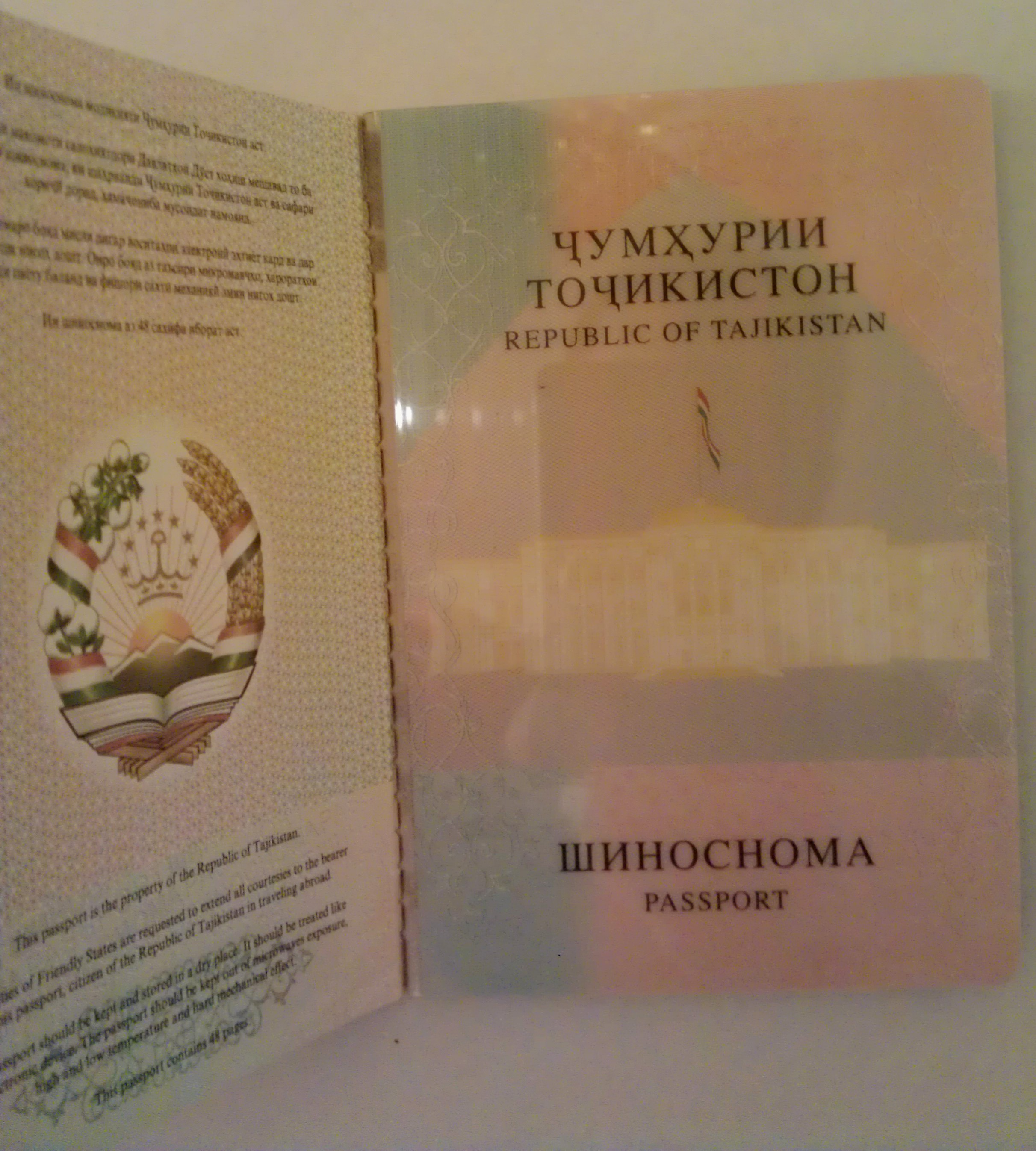
Tajikistan Biometric Passport: Inside cover

== Validity ==
The ordinary Tajik biometric passport is issued to Tajik citizens for 10 years, while the diplomatic and service biometric passports are issued for 5 years for international travel.

== Types ==
There are three types of Tajik passports:

Ordinary

- Issuable to all citizens of the Republic of Tajikistan for international travel.

Service

- Issued to individual citizens who work for the government, in order to travel for state business.

Diplomatic

- Issuable to all diplomats of Republic of Tajikistan overseas as well as to their family members.

== Passport cover ==
Pre-biometric Tajik passport covers are blue with the words Republic of Tajikistan inscribed on top of the booklet in Tajik language and also inscribed in English at the bottom. The Tajik coat of arms is emblazoned in the center of the cover page, followed on the bottom by the inscription of the word "PASSPORT" in Tajik and English.

== See also ==
- Republic of Tajikistan
- Foreign relations of Tajikistan
- List of passports
