= Timeline of Kabul =

The following is a timeline of the history of Kabul, Afghanistan.

== Prior to 20th century ==
- Circa 1500–1200 B.C. – The Rigveda, a book of Vedic Sanskrit hymns, called this town "Kubha". By about 1000 BC the Zend Avesta of Zoroastrianism mentioned the region and praised it as ideal.
- c. 678–549 BCE. - Kabul valley was part of the Median Empire.
- c. 549 BCE. the Median Empire was annexed by Cyrus the Great and Kabul valley became part the Achaemenid Empire.
- c. 330 BCE. the Achaemenid empire was conquered by Alexander the Great.
- c. 305 BCE. the valley is seized by Alexander's general Seleucus, becoming part of the Seleucid Empire.
- c. 5th century CE – Bala Hissar (fortress) built.
- 565 – Kabul Shahi is in power.
- 794 – Shahi capital relocated to Kabul from Kapisa.
- 1461 – Wali khan Beg is in power.
- 1502 – Arghunid Muqim in power.
- 1504 – Siege of Kabul; Mughal Babur in power.
- 1528 – Gardens of Babur developed outside city.
- 1545 – Mughal Humayun in power.
- 1637 – Char Chatta Bazaar built.
- 1646 – Shahjahani Mosque built.
- 1738 – Persian Nader Shah captures citadel.
- 1747 – Ahmad Shah Durrani in power.
- 1772 – Timur Shah Naizy in power.
- 1773 – Durrani capital relocated to Kabul from Kandahar (approximate date).
- 1793 – Timur Shah Mausoleum built.
- 1838 – British troops arrive.
- 1839 – 7 August: Shah Shujah Durrani in power.
- 1841 – 2 November: Uprising against Shah Shujah Durrani.
- 1842
  - Battle of Kabul.
  - 19 February: The Jalalabad earthquake caused severe damage and 500 deaths.
- 1850 – Char Chatta (bazaar) restored.

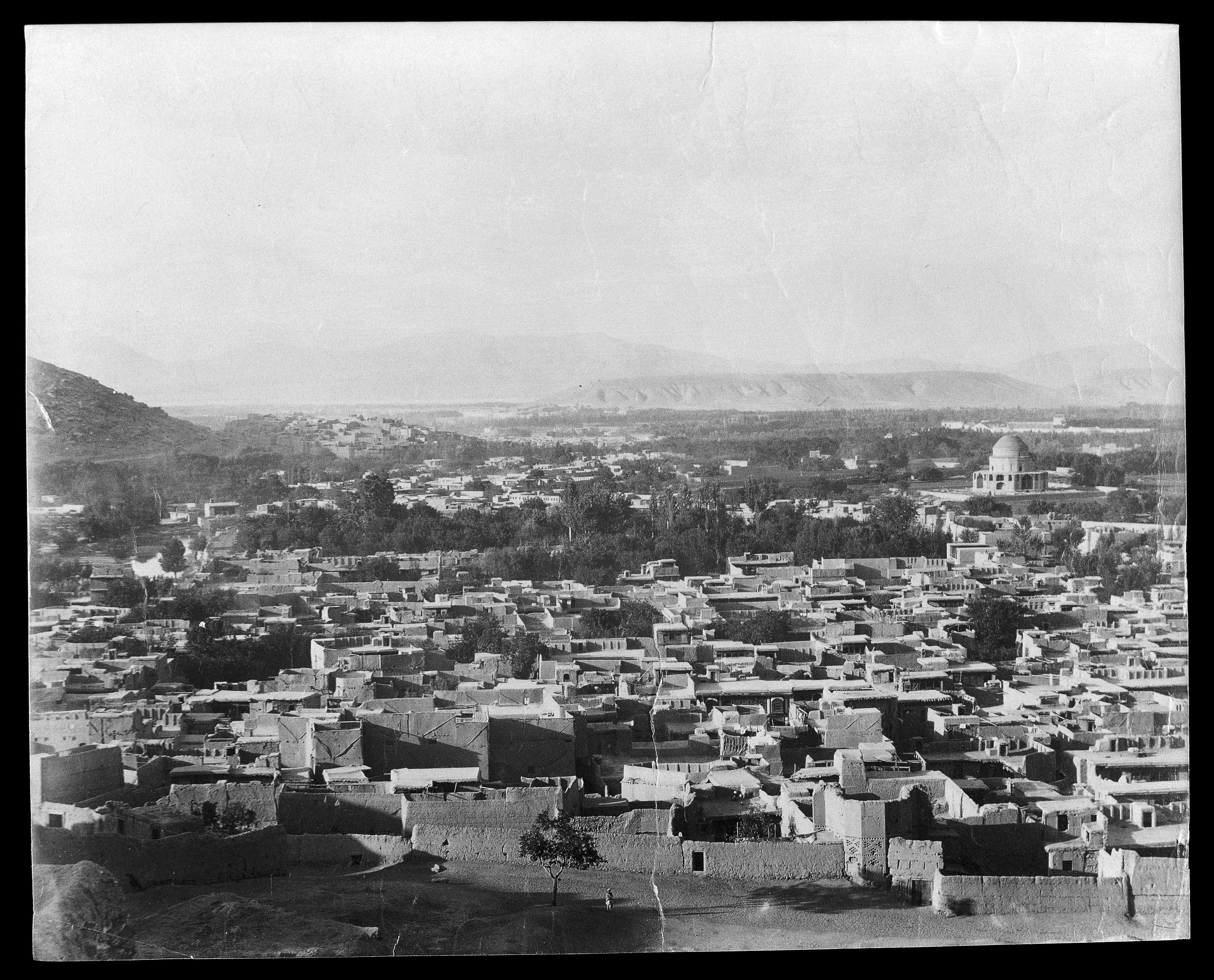
Panoramic view of Kabul, 1890s

- 1879
  - 3 September: British residency attacked.
  - October: British occupy Kabul.
  - December: Siege of the Sherpur Cantonment.
- 1880 - Accession of Abdur Rahman Khan as Emir of Afghanistan.

== 20th century ==
- 1901
  - Arg (presidential palace) built.
  - Population: 140,000 (estimate).
- 1903 – Habibia High School founded.
- 1913 – Clock tower built.
- 1919
  - Mu'arrif-i ma'arif begins publication.
  - Id Gah Mosque and Amir 'Abd al-Rahman Mausoleum built.
- 1920s
  - Shah-Do Shamshira Mosque built.
  - Tajbeg Palace and Darul Aman Palace built outside city.
- 1922 / 1301 SH
  - Lycée Esteqlal established.
  - Solar Hijri calendar officially adopted in Afghanistan.
- 1923 – Kabul–Darulaman Tramway constructed.
- 1924 – Amani High School founded.
- 1928 – Paghman Gardens open.
- 1931
  - Kabul University established.
  - National Museum of Afghanistan relocated to Darulaman from Koti Bagcha.
- 1933 – 8 November: Mohammed Nadir Shah assassinated.
- 1940 – Radio Kabul begins broadcasting with 20 kilowatt transmitter.
- 1948 – Ghulam Mohammad Farhad becomes mayor.
- 1957 – Sherpur Mosque built.
- 1961 – Jangalak neighborhood established.
- 1965 – Population: 435,000.

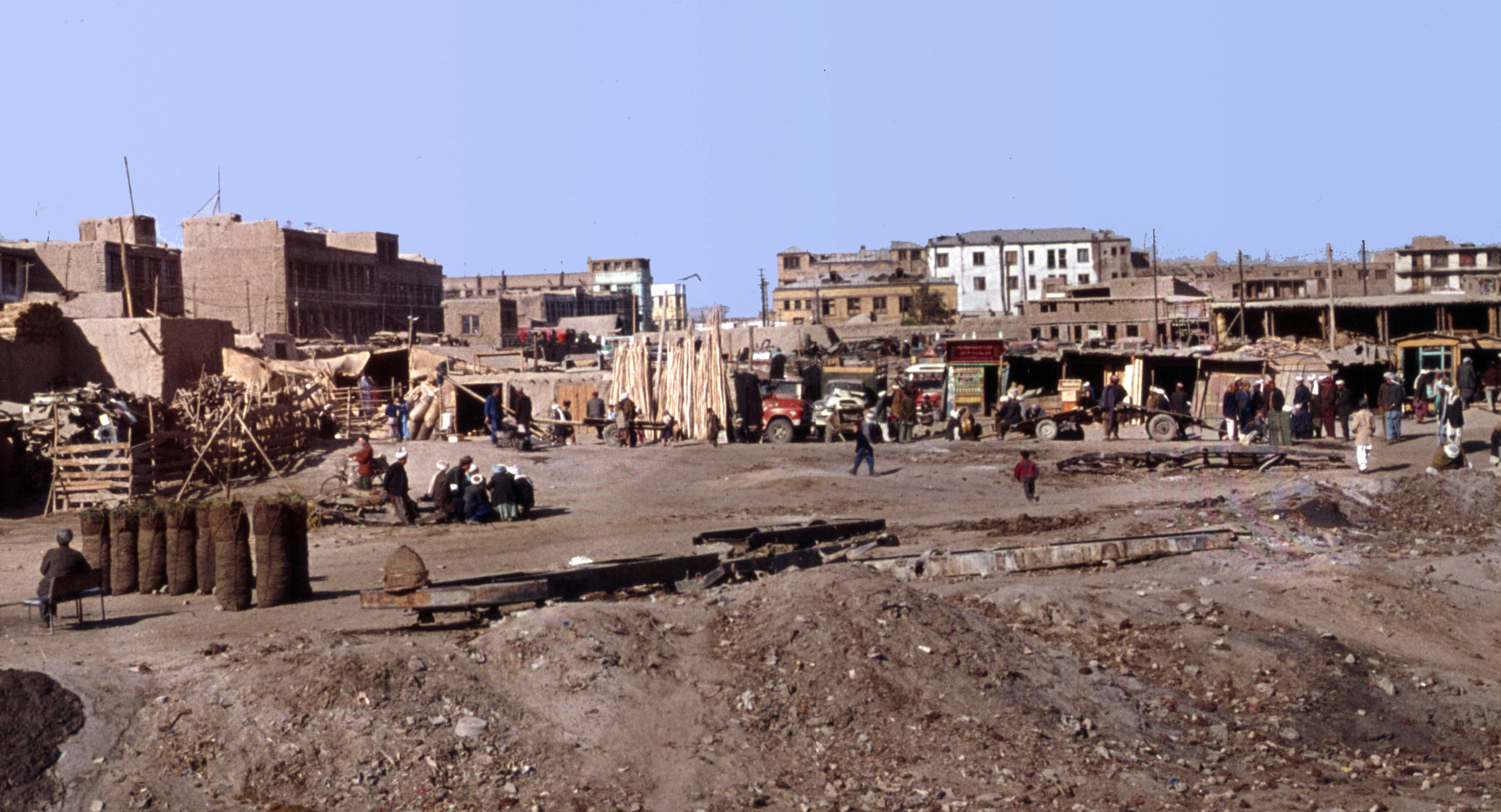
Market 1976

- 1967
  - Kabul Zoo inaugurated.
  - Kabul Golf Club opens outside city.
- 1968 – Naghlu Dam begins generating hydroelectric power.
- 1969 – Hotel Inter-Continental in business.
- 1970 – Kabul Airport in operation (approximate date).
- 1973 – Population: 318,094 city; 534,350 urban agglomeration.
- 1975 – Rock music festival held.

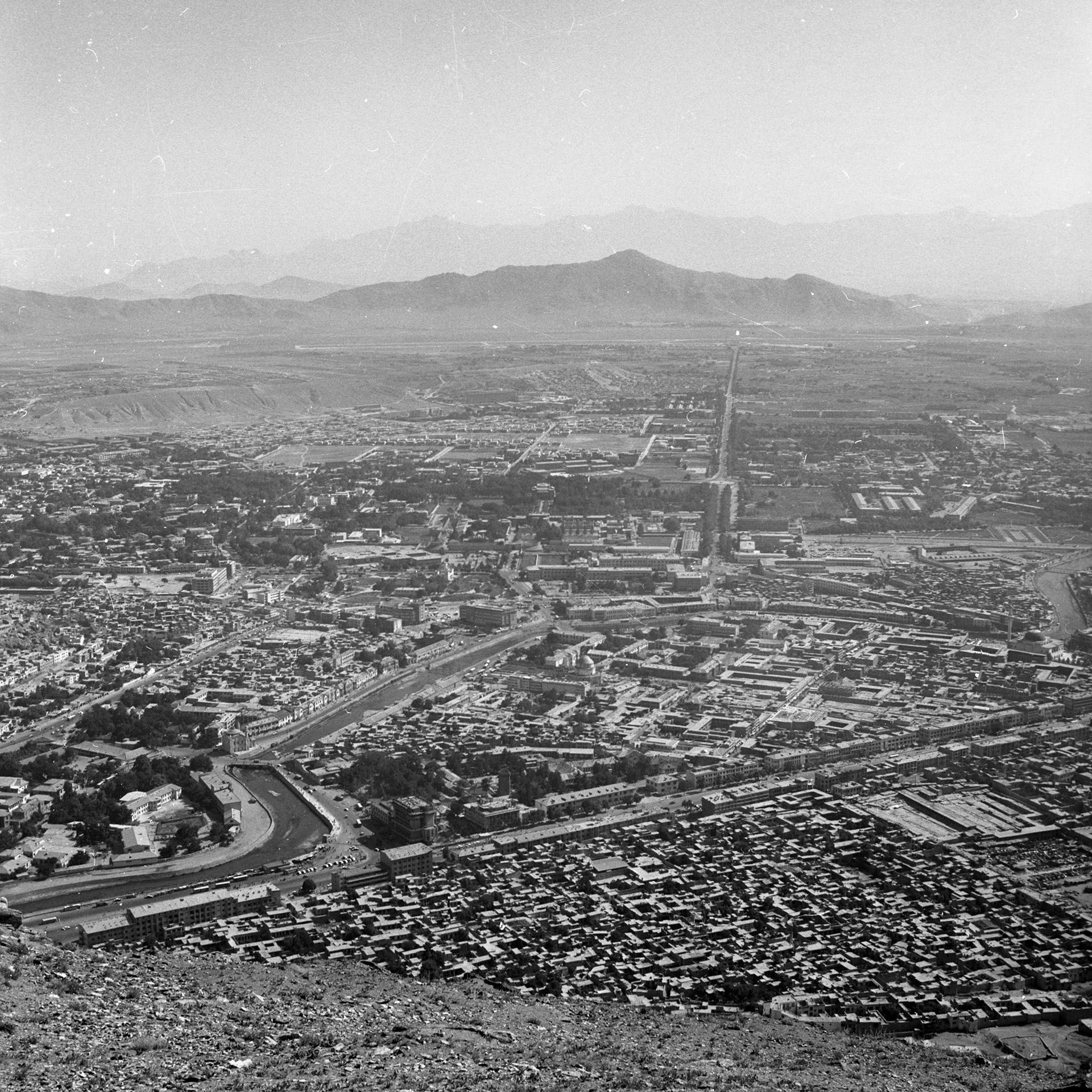
View towards Kabul in June 1976

- 1977 – Revolutionary Association of the Women of Afghanistan founded.
- 1978
  - April: Anti-Daoud demonstrations.
  - 28 April: Coup.
- 1979 – 27 December: Soviet forces occupy city.
- 1980 - 22 February: 3 Hut uprising
- 1988 – Population: 1,424,400 (estimate).
- 1989 – Soviet troops withdraw.
- 1992 – April: Battle of Kabul (1992–1996) begins.
- 1995 – 6 September: Pakistani embassy sacked.
- 1996 – 27 September: Taliban take city.

== 21st century ==
- 2001
  - November: City besieged by United States forces.
  - Population: 2,080,000 (estimate).
- 2002
  - January: Marjan of Kabul Zoo dies.
  - Nejat Drug Rehabilitation Centre active.
  - September: Bombing.
- 2003
  - December: Constitutional convention.
  - Khwaja Faqiron Mosque reconstructed.
  - Music school established.
- 2004
  - Jamhuriat Hospital built.
  - Sultani Museum established.
- 2005
  - French Medical Institute for Children established.
  - City administrative sectors expand to 18 (from 11).
  - Kabul City Center (shopping mall) opens.
- 2008
  - January: Serena Hotel attack.
  - July: Bombing of Indian embassy.
- 2009
  - February: Raids.
  - August: Bombing of NATO building.
  - October: Bombing of Indian embassy.
  - October: UN attack.
  - Air pollution in Kabul reaches annual mean of 86 PM2.5 and 260 PM10, much higher than recommended.
- 2010
  - January: Muhammad Yunus Nawandish becomes mayor.
  - January attack.
  - February attack.
  - May bombing.
- 2011
  - May: Bombing of military hospital.
  - June: Inter-Continental Hotel attack.
  - September attack.
  - December: Bombing at mosque.
  - Kabul National Cricket Stadium opens.
  - Institute for Afghan Arts & Architecture established.
- 2012
  - February: Quran burning protests.
  - April attacks by Taliban.
  - May: Assassination of Arsala Rahmani Daulat.
  - Abdul Rahman Mosque and Afghanistan Football Federation stadium open.
  - Population: 3,289,000 (estimate).
- 2013
  - June bombings.
  - Presidential palace attack.
- 2014
  - Restaurant bombing.
  - Serena Hotel attack.
  - December bombings.
- 2015
  - Park Palace guesthouse attack.
  - Parliament attack.
  - 7 August attacks.
  - 10 August bombing.
  - 22 August bombing.
  - Spanish Embassy attack.
- 2016
  - February bombing.
  - April attack.
  - Attack on Canadian Embassy guards.
  - July bombing near Deh Mazang square.
  - 1 August attack.
  - American University attack.
  - September attack.
  - November bombing.
  - Population: 3,817,241 (estimate).
- 2017
  - January bombing.
  - Supreme Court bombing.
  - Hospital attack.
  - May bombing.
  - 3 June bombing.
  - June mosque attack.
  - 24 July bombing.
  - Iraqi embassy attack.
  - 28 December bombing.
- 2018
  - 4 January bombing.
  - Inter-Continental Hotel attack.
  - Ambulance bombing.
  - March bombing.
  - 22 April bombing.
  - 30 April bombings.
  - August bombing.
  - September attacks.
  - November bombing.
- 2019
  - Mosque bombing.
  - 1 July attack.
  - 25 July bombings.
  - 28 July bombing.
  - 7 August bombing.
  - 17 August bombing.
  - 2 and 5 September bombings.
  - 17 September bombing.
  - November bombing.
- 2020
  - February bombing.
  - 6 March shooting.
  - Gurdwara attack.
  - University attack.
- 2021
  - School bombing.
  - Mosque bombing.
  - June bombings.
  - Fall of Kabul

== See also ==
- History of Kabul
- List of rulers of Kabul
- List of newspapers in Kabul
- List of universities in Kabul Province
- List of schools in Kabul
- Timelines of other cities in Afghanistan: Herat
- Timeline of Afghan history

== Bibliography ==
Published in 19th century

- Jedidiah Morse; Richard C. Morse (1823), "Cabul", A New Universal Gazetteer (4th ed.), New Haven: S. Converse
- Alexander Burnes (1973), Cabool: being a personal narrative of a journey to, and residence in that city, in the years 1836, 7, and 8, London: J. Murray (published 1842), OCLC 7415868
- Mountstuart Elphinstone (1842), "(City of Caubul)", An Account of the Kingdom of Caubul (2nd ed.), London: R. Bentley, OCLC 03061751
- G.T. Vigne (1843), "(Kabul)", A Personal Narrative of a Visit to Ghuzni, Kabul and Afghanistan (2nd ed.), London: G. Routledge, OCLC 6388460
- Joshua Duke (1883), "(Kabul City)", Recollections of the Kabul campaign, London: W. H. Allen & Co., OCLC 5729453
- Edward Balfour (1885), "Kabul", Cyclopaedia of India (3rd ed.), London: B. Quaritch

Published in 20th century

- "Kabul City", Imperial Gazetteer of India (New ed.), Oxford: Clarendon Press (published 1908), 1907
- Holdich, Thomas Hungerford (1910). "Kabul" . Encyclopædia Britannica. Vol. 15 (11th ed.). pp. 624–625.
- Angus Hamilton (1910), "Kabul", Afghanistan, Boston: J. B. Millet Company, OCLC 2086903
- Schellinger and Salkin, ed. (1996). "Kabul". International Dictionary of Historic Places: Asia and Oceania. UK: Routledge. ISBN 978-1-884964-04-6.
- Who Governs Kabul? Explaining Urban Politics in a Post-War Capital City, London: Crisis States Research Centre, 2000 – via International Relations and Security Network

Published in 21st century

- C. E. Bosworth, ed. (2007). "Kabul". Historic Cities of the Islamic World. Leiden: Koninklijke Brill.
- "Kabul". Grove Encyclopedia of Islamic Art & Architecture. Oxford University Press. 2009.
