= List of terrorist attacks in Kabul =

This is a list of terrorist attacks in Kabul, the capital of Afghanistan.

== 1995 ==
- September 6: 1995 attack on the Embassy of Pakistan in Kabul

== 2002 ==
- September 5: 2002 Kabul bombing

== 2003 ==
- July 9: 2004 attack on the Embassy of Pakistan in Kabul

== 2004 ==
- January 14: 2008 Kabul Serena Hotel attack
- July 7: 2008 Indian embassy bombing in Kabul

== 2009 ==
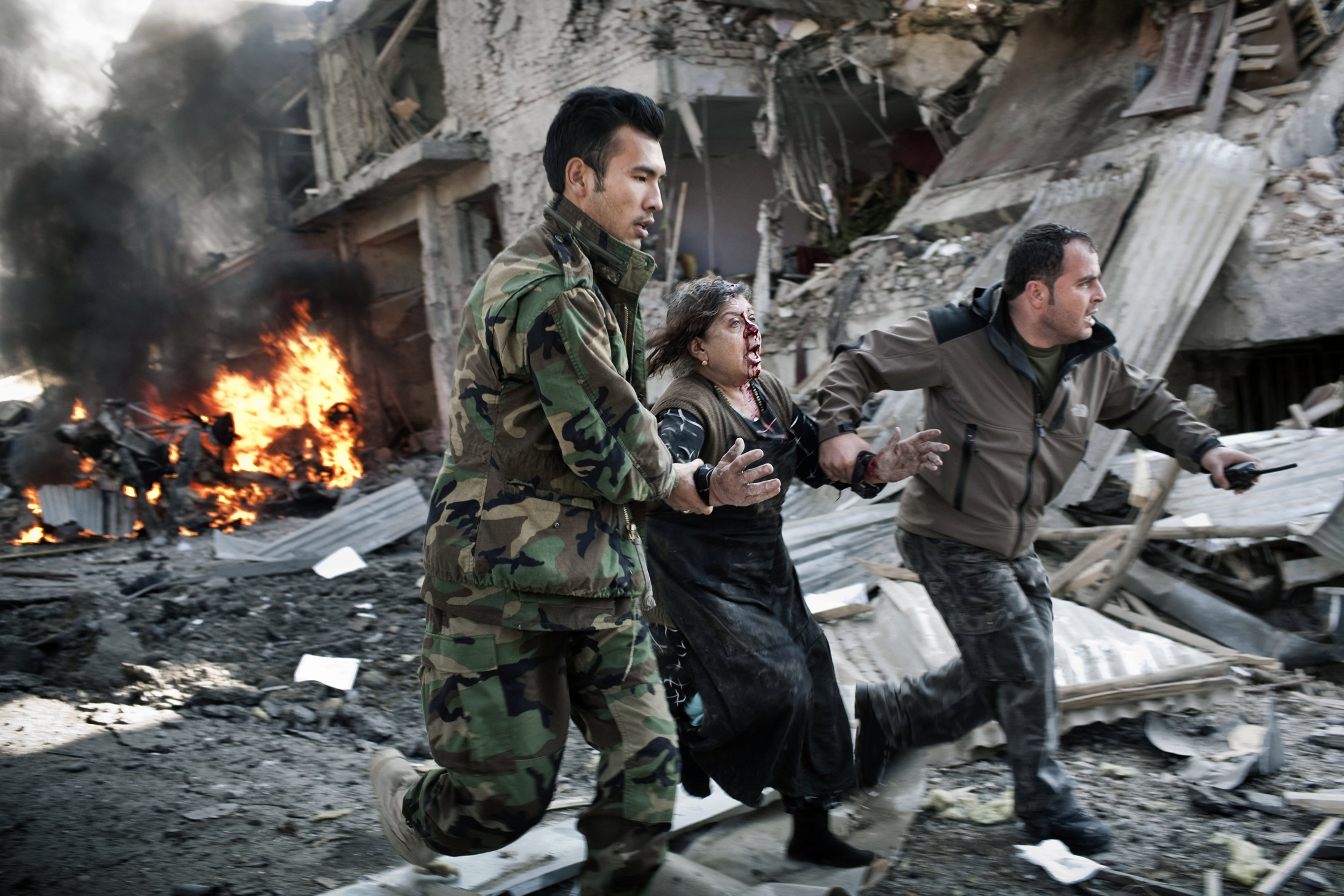
Security forces rush a woman away from the scene of a suicide bombing on December 15, 2009.

- February 11: February 2009 Kabul raids
- August 15: 2009 NATO Afghanistan headquarters bombing
- October 8: 2009 Kabul Indian embassy attack
- October 28: 2009 UN guest house attack in Kabul
- November 13: 2009 NATO convoy attack near Camp Qargha in Kabul

== 2010 ==
- January 18: January 2010 Kabul attack
- February 26: February 2010 Kabul attack
- May 18: May 2010 Kabul bombing

== 2011 ==
- June 28: 2011 Inter-Continental Hotel Kabul attack
- September 13: September 2011 Kabul attack
- December 6: 2011 Afghanistan Ashura bombings
- May 21: On 20 May 2011, a Taliban Haqqani suicide bomber detonated himself in a highly guarded area where there is a military hospital named Sardar Mohammad Daud Khan Hospital, killing six medical students and injuring 23 more.

== 2012 ==
- April 15: April 2012 Afghanistan attacks

== 2013 ==
- June 11: 11 June 2013 Kabul bombing
- June 25: 2013 Afghan presidential palace attack

== 2014 ==
- January 17: January 2014 Kabul restaurant attack
- March 20: 2014 Kabul Serena Hotel shooting
- December 11: December 2014 Kabul bombings

== 2015 ==
- May 13: 2015 Park Palace guesthouse attack
- June 22: 2015 Kabul Parliament attack
- August 7: 7 August 2015 Kabul attacks
- August 10: 10 August 2015 Kabul suicide bombing
- August 22: 22 August 2015 Kabul suicide bombing
- December 11: 2015 Spanish Embassy attack in Kabul

== 2016 ==
- February 1: A suicide bombing by the Taliban at a police station killed 20 police officers.
- April 19: April 2016 Kabul attack
- June 20: Kabul attack on Canadian Embassy guards
- July 23: July 2016 Kabul bombing
- August 1: A Taliban truck bomb killed a police officer and one of the attackers, after which the remaining two Taliban attackers were shot dead.
- August 24: American University of Afghanistan attack
- September 5: September 2016 Kabul attacks
- November 21: A suicide bombing at a mosque kills around 30 people.

== 2017 ==
- January 10: The first of the January 2017 Afghanistan bombings was a twin suicide bombing in front of the National Assembly of Afghanistan in Kabul, killing 46 people. Later attacks took place in Kandahar and Lashkargah.
- February 7: A suicide bombing near the Supreme Court of Afghanistan killed at least 20 people.
- March 8: March 2017 Kabul attack
- May 31: May 2017 Kabul attack
- June 3: Three bombings at the funeral of a protester who died the day before killed at least 20 people.
- June 15: A suicide bombing at a mosque killed four people.
- July 24: A Taliban suicide bombing kills at least 35 people.
- July 31: A suicide bombing followed by a gun attack on the embassy of Iraq in Kabul left two Afghan embassy workers and all four attackers dead.
- October 20: 20 October 2017 Afghanistan attacks
- December 28: 28 December 2017 Kabul suicide bombing

== 2018 ==
- January 2: A car bomb wounded three police officers.
- January 4: A suicide bombing killed 20.
- January 20: 2018 Inter-Continental Hotel Kabul attack
- January 27: Kabul ambulance bombing
- January 29: Shooting at the Marshal Fahim National Defense University
- February 24: A suicide bomber blew himself up near a security post, killing at least three people and wounding several others.
- March 9: A suicide bomber blew himself up, killing at least seven people, according to officials. The attack was apparently intended to hit crowds gathered to commemorate the death of Abdul Ali Mazari, a political leader from the mainly Shiite Hazara minority.
- March 21: March 2018 Kabul suicide bombing
- April 22: 22 April 2018 Kabul suicide bombing
- April 30: 30 April 2018 Kabul suicide bombings
- June 4: A suicide bomber detonated his explosives targeting a gathering of Afghanistan's top clerics in Kabul, killing at least 14 people and wounding 19. Shortly afterwards, a magnetic bomb attached to a police car exploded and as a result three people were wounded, the Islamic State – Khorasan Province claimed responsibility.
- June 11: 17 people were killed and 40 others were seriously injured after a suicide bomber detonated his explosives at an Afghan ministry. ISIS–K claimed responsibility.
- July 15: A suicide bomber detonated near a government ministry, killing eight people and wounding 17 others. The ISIS–K claimed responsibility.
- July 22: 23 people, including an AFP driver, were killed and 107 others injured in a suicide bombing near Kabul International Airport as scores of people were leaving the airport after welcoming home Afghan Vice President Abdul Rashid Dostum from exile, ISIS–K claimed responsibility.
- August 13: A suicide bomber detonated outside an Afghan election office killing one and injuring another person, the Taliban is suspected of the attack.
- August 15: A suicide bombing by the Islamic State in an educative academy left at least 48 killed and 67 injured.
- September 5: September 2018 Kabul attacks: 26 people were killed and 91 were injured in suicide blasts targeting a wrestling club and emergency teams, two journalists were among the dead. ISIS–K claimed responsibility for the bombing.
- September 9: A suicide bomber on a motorbike blew himself up near a group of people commemorating the death anniversary of a famed resistance leader, killing at least seven people and injuring an additional 25, officials said. ISIS–K claimed responsibility for the attack.
- November 20: November 2018 Kabul bombing: A suicide bombing on a gathering of religious scholars killed 55 people and injures 94.
- December 24: December 2018 Kabul attack: A suicide and gun attack on a government compound killed at least 43 people and at least 10 people were wounded, interior ministry spokesman Najib Danish said. Most of the victims were civilians. No group immediately claimed responsibility for the attack.

== 2019 ==
- May 24: 2019 Kabul mosque bombing
- July 1: 1 July 2019 Kabul attack
- July 19: A bombing outside Kabul University kills eight people.
- July 25: Three different bombings, variously claimed by the Taliban and the Islamic State, kill at least 15 people in total.
- July 28: 28 July 2019 Kabul suicide bombing
- August 7: 7 August 2019 Kabul bombing
- August 17: 17 August 2019 Kabul bombing
- September 2 and 5: 2 and 5 September 2019 Kabul bombings
- September 17: 17 September 2019 Afghanistan bombings
- November 13: A car bombing kills 12 people.

== 2020 ==
- February 11: A suicide bombing kills at least six people.
- March 6: 6 March 2020 Kabul shooting
- March 25: Kabul gurdwara attack
- May 12: Three gunmen wearing police uniforms carried out a mass shooting in the maternity ward of a hospital. The hospital is located in the predominately Shi'ite Hazara neighborhood of Dashte Barchi and is assisted by Médecins Sans Frontières (Doctors Without Borders) personnel. The attackers killed 24 people and injured another 16.
- May 30: A private bus carrying 15 employees of the Khurshid TV news station was hit by a roadside bomb, killing an economic reporter, Mir Wahed Shah, a technician, Shafiq Amiri, and wounding seven other people. The United States, the European Union, and NATO condemned the attack.
- June 5: An hour-long gun battle erupted in Gul Dara district when insurgents attacked a police checkpoint, killing three police officers.
- June 12: A Sunni mosque was bombed, killing four people and injuring another eight. On 17 June, twelve security forces members were killed and five were wounded during a Taliban attack in Aqcha District, Jowzjan Province. Four soldiers were taken hostage in the attack, and five Taliban militants killed.
- July 14: Five civilians were killed and another 11 wounded when their car hit a suspected Taliban roadside bomb.
- July 19: Two soldiers were killed after Taliban gunmen opened fire on them while they were traveling on a motorcycle.
- August 19: A magnetic mine killed one and injured another. Also, a rocket attack left at least 3 people dead and another 16 were injured in Kabul.
- September 8: One Taliban member was killed and another two were wounded after they attacked security forces in Kabul Province.
- September 9: At least 10 people were killed and another 16 were injured in a bombing.
- September 16: A member of the Afghan National Directorate of Security was shot dead and his driver was injured.
- September 21: One child was killed and another three people were injured when two mines exploded.
- October 24: A suicide bombing at an education centre killed 24 people, mostly students.
- October 26: At least three people were injured by a magnetic mine explosion.
- October 27: A magnetic mine explosion left at least three people dead and at least 10 injured in Kabul.
- November 2: 2020 Kabul University attack
- November 7: A bomb attached to the vehicle of former TOLO TV presenter Yama Siawash exploded, killing the journalist and two other civilians while they were inside the car.
- November 21: 23 rockets hit the commercial area, parks, shopping areas, killing eight people and injuring more than 30.
- December 20: A car bomb exploded, targeting the convoy of MP & founder of Khan Steel Haji Khan Mohammad Wardak beside the 3rd Gate of Ahmadi Plaza in Spin Kalay Square of Khushal Khan PD5. Khan survived the attack, but at least 10 civilians were killed and 52 others were injured. Several cars and houses were damaged nearby. The blast was condemned by the Taliban and the former government while no group claimed responsibility.

== 2021 ==
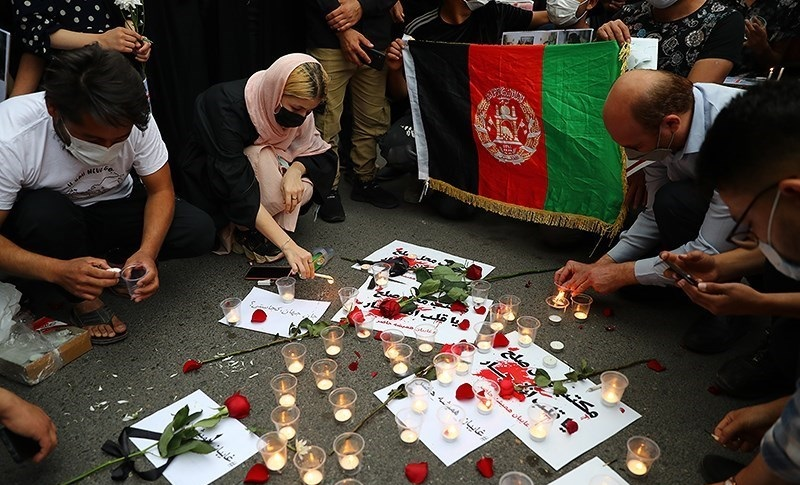
Iranian civilians lay flowers in memory of the victims of the 2021 Kabul school bombing

- May 8: 2021 Kabul school bombing: A car bomb and two other improvised explosive devices explode outside a secondary school in the Dashte Barchi neighborhood in western Kabul, killing 90 people, most of whom were students.
- May 14: An explosion at a mosque killed 12 people, including the imam.
- June 1: Two vehicle bombings killed at least ten people.
- August 3: A Taliban suicide bombing and shooting targeted the house of Minister of Defence Bismillah Khan Mohammadi, killing at least eight people. Khan Mohammadi was unharmed.
- August 26: 2021 Kabul airport attack
- September 18: A car bombing occurs in Dasht-e-Barchi, wounding at least two people.
- October 3: Several people are killed and at least 20 wounded by a bombing outside Eid Gah Mosque which the targeted memorial service for Taliban spokesman Zabihullah Mujahid’s mother.
- October 20: At least two people wounded when a grenade was launched from Kabul Zoo and successfully struck Taliban security forces stationed in Dehmazang Square in Police District 3 of Kabul. A separate, more powerful IED explosion which targeted a Taliban pickup truck killed at least one person and wounded at least seven, including three students.
- October 21: Explosion blew up a power pylon in Qala Murad Beg area of Kabul province, cutting off a 220 kV imported power line which provided power to residents of Kabul and neighboring provinces.
- November 2: 2021 Kabul hospital attack
- November 13: At least two killed and at least five injured in IED explosion which struck a bus in traveling on the main avenue in Dashti Barchi neighborhood. The blast targeted members of the Hazara minority community
- November 17: Twin blasts in western Kabul's Dasht-e Barchi neighborhood killed one and wounded six others.
- November 23: A huge explosion ripped through Kabul's Kandahar Market. At least 2 Taliban security personnel were injured in the explosion, which resulted from the detonation of a magnetic mine which was attached to a Taliban Ranger vehicle. Gunfire was reported in the area of this explosion as well. The area ia also known as the Mujahidin Bazaar and was formerly known as Bush Market.
- November 25: Explosion occurs at a traffic circle in Karte Parwan, casualties unknown. Interior Ministry claims no casualties.
- November 30: At least five people were wounded in an explosion in Kabul's Police District Six, including Taliban fighters. Despite denial of casualties from the Interior Ministry and local authorities, injuries to five people, including security personnel, during the blast were confirmed by eyewitnesses as well as the local media outlet Ariana News. It was also revealed that the blast occurred near the prominent Habibia High School.
- December 4, 2021: Explosion occurs on Kabul's Fifth Taimani Street, no casualties immediately reported.
- December 10, 2021: Two separate explosions in Kabul kill two people and wound four others. One explosion occurred on a minibus in the Dasht-e-Barchi district of Kabul, while the second explosion occurred was in the district's Dehbouri area.
- December 14: A roadside bomb exploded targeting an IEA vehicle around 11am in Tank Logar area of PD8. One civilian was killed and two members of the Islamic Emirate of Afghanistan were injured. So far, no group has claimed responsibility.
- December 23: A car bomb explodes near the gate outside the main passport department office. Islamic State later claims responsibility for the attack.

== 2022 ==
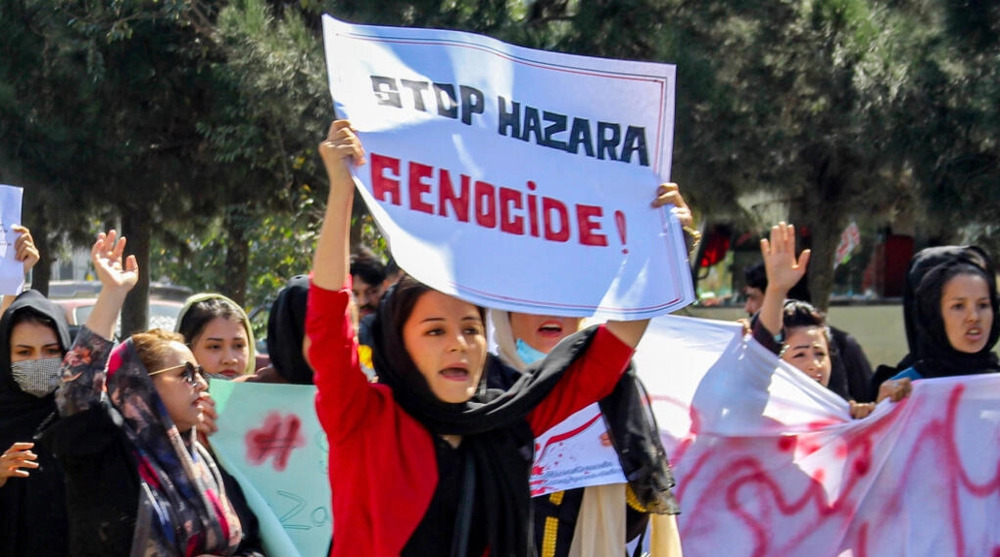
Hazara women condemning the September 2022 Kabul school bombing

- January 3: A landmine explosion occurs in front of the district office of Kabul's 11th police district.
- January 12: Aqil Jan Ozam, deputy spokesman for the Interior Ministry, announces that an explosion targeted a military vehicle in Kabul's police district 9, injuring at least 2 Taliban members.
- January 13: Roadside bomb explodes in the Parwan-i-Seh area.
- January 16: A child is killed and two Taliban security personnel wounded by a bombing in Butkhak area.
- January 17: An explosion and gunshots are heard in Niezbag locality.
- April 3: At least one killed and at least 58 wounded in grenade blast at Kabul's Sarai Shahzada money exchange market.
- April 19: April 2022 Kabul school bombing
- April 29: April 2022 Kabul mosque bombing
- April 30: One killed and at least three injured in Kabul bus attack.
- May 25: May 2022 Kabul mosque bombing
- June 11: At least four killed in minibus bombing.
- June 18: Bombing at Sikh temple kills two and injures seven.
- July 29: At least two killed and 13 wounded in grenade explosion which took place among a crowd of spectators during a cricket match at Kabul International Cricket Stadium.
- August 5: An 5 August 2022 Kabul bombing: A bombing in a Shia residential area killed at least eight people.
- August 6: Three people killed, 22 wounded in IED explosion the Pol-e-Sukhta area.
- August 11: Suicide blast occurs at seminary, killing prominent Taliban religious leader Sheikh Rahimullah Haqqani. ISIS–K claimed responsibility for killing a prominent Taliban cleric at his religious center in Kabul.
- August 13: Four people, including two Taliban security forces, were wounded by an IED explosion.
- August 17: Dozens were killed in an explosion in a mosque. Many were reported killed in the explosion. Residents nearby also heard gunshots after the explosion occurred. Kabul's Emergency Hospital received at least 27 victims of the explosion. 2 arrived deceased, while another died undergoing treatment. Among those killed was the mosque's imam Mawlawi Amir Muhammad Kabuli, a prominent Taliban cleric who also ran an Islamic school at the site of the explosion. It was later reported that 21 people were killed and 33 were wounded, though some witnesses at the scene put the death toll higher, with one witness claiming that "many other Taliban, as well children, were martyred” and that the total number of actual casualties was "more than 100 (killed and wounded)."
- August 31: Explosion and attack occurs in the Khair Khana area in District 11. At least 3 Taliban members killed and 7 injured. Target was a Taliban convoy which was returning from a military parade in Bagram. Another explosion in Kabul's Police District 17 kills 2 and injures 3.
- September 5: Bombing of the Russian embassy in Kabul
- September 10: Two back-to-back IED explosions occur at bus stop in Poole Khoshk area of western Kabul's Dasht-e-Bachi settlement, injuring at least 3 people.
- September 23: September 2022 Kabul mosque bombing: A car bomb explodes near a mosque in Kabul's prominent Wazir Akbar Khan neighborhood, with government officials claiming at least 7 people killed and 41 injured. Local Afghan media claims at least 9 killed.
- September 30: September 2022 Kabul school bombing
- October 5: An explosion occurs at mosque near Interior Ministry headquarters, killing at least four people and injuring 25.
- October 15: Explosion occurs at security checkpoint in Kabul's 2nd district.
- October 28: An explosion occurs at Sheikh Mohammad Rohani Mosque in Kabul's 5th police district. Taliban claim 7 injured, while locals claim 10 injured.
- November 2: A roadside mine strikes minibus carrying Ministry of Rural Rehabilitation and Development workers. Seven reported as injured.
- November 12: Two explosions occur, the first in Charahi Sedara area and then near Jamhuriat hospital located in the city's fourth security area.
- November 17: An explosion occurs near a mosque in prominent Wazir Akbar Khan neighborhood. Interior Ministry spokesman reports 14 casualties, including four dead.
- November 21: An explosion targets a car, killing two people.
- December 12: 2022 Kabul hotel attack: An attack occurs at hotel in the Kabul Longan Hotel, with at least three civilians dead and 18 injured. Two foreigners are reported to be among those injured.
- December 23: Local media reports an explosion at a mosque in Police District 5, casualties reported.
- December 25: An explosion reported in Daraulman area of Kabul's Police District 6

== 2023 ==
- January 1: 2023 Kabul airport bombing: An explosion occurs outside the military airport; multiple casualties are reported. A Kabul resident told Agence France-Presse that an air force officer was among those killed.
- January 11: Ministry of Foreign Affairs of Afghanistan bombing: A bombing occurs outside Afghan Foreign Ministry headquarters, killing at least five people and injuring more than 40 others.
- January 30: Explosion reported in Kabul's Kote Sangi district.
- February 4: Explosion in Kabul's Pashtunistan Watt neighborhood wounds at least two people.
- February 5: Explosive laden vehicles manage to infiltrate Kabul's Green Zone, Saudi Arabian embassy forced to evacuate.
- February 21: Bomb attached to vehicle explodes near Abul Fazl Shrine in Kabul's Police District 2. No casualties reported, but the blast was acknowledged to be massive.
- February 23: Senior Taliban commander killed at checkpoint blast that also seriously injured four others in the Sartapeh area of Kabul.
- March 9: Explosion reported in Khushal Khan area of Kabul’s Police District 5.
- March 10: Blast occurs at the intersection of Spin Kelly in the Khushal Khan Mina area, fifth district of Kabul, two people were injured.
- March 27: At least six killed and several injured at second attack near Afghan Foreign Ministry headquarters since January.
- August 21: At least two people were killed in magnetic mine explosion outside Justice Ministry headquarters.
- October 28: 4 people lost their lives and 7 others suffered severe injury after a bomb explosion by ISIS.
- November 8: November 2023 Kabul bombing.

== 2024 ==
- January 6: A bomb exploded on a minibus, kills at least two and wounds 14 in Dashti Barchi area of Kabul.
- January 11: Two separate bomb explosions occurred at separate locations in Kabul's Dasht-e-Barchi area. First explosion occurs near mosque, while second detonates outside a commercial center, killing 2 and wounding 14.
- September 2: A suicide attack in the Qala Bakhtiar area killed at least 6 and wounds 13. The attack was later claimed by the Islamic State in Khorasan.

== 2026 ==
- 19 January:Kabul Chinese Restaurant Explosion Incident
