= 2017 Afghanistan attack =

2017 Afghanistan attack may refer to:

- January 2017 Afghanistan bombings
- February 2017 Supreme Court of Afghanistan attack
- March 2017 Kabul attack
- 2017 Nangarhar airstrike
- 2017 Afghanistan–Pakistan border skirmish
- May 2017 Kabul attack
- 3 June 2017 Kabul bombing
- June 2017 Herat mosque bombing
- June 2017 Kabul mosque attack
- June 2017 Lashkargah bombing
- 24 July 2017 Kabul bombing
- 2017 attack on the Iraqi embassy in Kabul
- August 2017 Herat mosque attack
- 28 December 2017 Kabul suicide bombing
