= September 2019 Kabul bombings =

September 2019 Kabul bombings may refer to:

- 2 and 5 September 2019 Kabul bombings
- 17 September 2019 Afghanistan bombings, one of which occurred in Kabul
