= August 2015 Kabul attacks =

August 2015 Kabul attacks may refer to:

- 7 August 2015 Kabul attacks
- 10 August 2015 Kabul suicide bombing
- 22 August 2015 Kabul suicide bombing
