= August 2019 Kabul bombing =

August 2019 Kabul bombing may refer to:

- 7 August 2019 Kabul bombing
- 17 August 2019 Kabul bombing
