= 1 July 2019 Kabul attack =

Terrorist attack in Kabul

- Part of War in Afghanistan (2001–present)
- Kabul (Afghanistan)
- Location: Kabul, Afghanistan
- Date: 1 July 2019
- Target: Defense Ministry building
- Attack type: Car bombing Mass murder Mass shooting
- Weapons: Car bomb Guns
- Deaths: 40 (+5)
- Injuries: 105+
- Perpetrator: Taliban

On 1 July 2019, a combined gun and bomb attack took place in the Wazir Akbar Khan neighborhood of Kabul, Afghanistan. The attackers initially detonated a bomb-laden truck, after which five gunmen entered a nearby building under construction and fired on Afghan security personnel evacuating people onto the street. At least forty-five were killed, including the five attackers. The spokesman for the Afghan Ministry of Public Health, Wahidullah Mayar, said that 116 civilians, including 26 children and 5 women, were wounded. The Taliban claimed the responsibility for the bomb attack in Kabul and said although civilians were not the Taliban target, some were injured.

== Background ==
The attack occurred during the ongoing Taliban–United States peace talks in Doha, Qatar. In the days before the attack, the militant group carried out multiple deadly attacks on security forces all across the country.

According to The New York Times, the violence in Afghanistan has increased during the 18th year of the United States military presence in Afghanistan.

== Attack ==
The Taliban attacked Afghanistan's capital housing military and government buildings using a powerful car bomb on 1 July 2019, and a gunfight began soon after. The attacks killed 40 civilians and injured 116. The bomb exploded during the morning in Kabul when the streets were filled with people.

The attack happened in two stages. The first was the detonation of a truck or minibus bomb, packed full of explosives, in central Kabul. The explosion happened in the Puli Mahmood Khan area of the Wazir Akbar Khan neighborhood during rush hour. The area houses many government, diplomatic, and military buildings and installations. The blast was powerful, shaking buildings up to 2 kilometers (1.2 miles) away, sending a plume of smoke in the air and destroying many cars and buildings. At least 51 students were injured during the blast, which damaged two nearby schools and shattered windows of three others. The Pashto media organization Shamshad TV said their office was hit by the blast, with one security guard killed and several journalists wounded. The TV station aired images of broken glass and the damage to its office in the aftermath of the bombing. The New York Times reported that 40 people were killed in the car bombing, 34 civilians and 6 security forces.

After the explosion, five attackers entered a nearby building under construction and opened fire on security personnel in the street, sparking a gunfight. The shootout lasted for over 7 hours until all 5 attackers were killed by responders. The spokesman for the Ministry of Interior Affairs, Nasrat Rahimi, said after the explosion, attackers entered the Ministry of Defense building, and two car bombs exploded separately near the museum site and the television site. The attackers had been surrounded by the ministry security forces and one of them was killed. He finally added that a child, a security guard of Shamshad TV, and 2 soldiers of the Special Forces were killed during the attack incident and more than 210 people had been rescued during the operation.

An office belonging to the Afghan Football Federation was damaged during the incident, and its chief, Yosuf Kargar, and several players injured.

The Afghanistan Ministry of Education spokesman, Nooria Nazhat, announced that 51 students from two schools near the blast site were hurt by flying shards of glass, and the explosion resulted in part of the school collapsing.

== Responsibility ==
The Taliban militant group has claimed responsibility for the attack, saying that it attacked "the defence ministry’s technical installation".

Zabihullah Mujahid, one of two official spokesmen for the Taliban, mentioned on a Twitter account that a logistics and engineering unit of the Ministry of Defense was the intended target. He added that people were not the target of attacks, but some of them have been wounded.

== Aftermath ==
Many of the people wounded in the attack were taken into local hospitals, including many school children. After the attack, many residents and lawmakers criticized security and intelligence agencies, demanding to know how a truck full of explosives and five attackers managed to enter the area, which contains many secure buildings and compounds, among them the United States embassy and the Kabul Presidential Palace.

== See also ==
- 2019 Kabul mosque bombing
- 2019 Ghazni bombing
- 28 July 2019 Kabul suicide bombing
- List of terrorist attacks in Kabul
