= Timeline of Herat =

The following is a timeline of the history of the city of Herat, Afghanistan.

== Prior to 15th century ==
- 500 BCE - Persian town in Aria established (approximate date).
- 330 BCE - Artacoana captured by Alexander III of Macedon.
- 167 BCE - Town becomes part of the Parthian Empire.
- 127 BCE - Town becomes part of the Kushan Empire
- 642 CE - Siege of Herat; Arabs in power.
- 1042 - City besieged by Seljuq Tughril.
- 1064 - Alp Arslan in power.
- 1102 - Earthquake.
- 1157 - The city was destroyed by an irruption of the Ghuzz, the predecessors of the modern Turkomans.
- 1163 - Bobrinski Bucket produced in Herat.
- 1175 - Ghurids in power.
- 1197 - Conflict between blacksmiths' and coppersmiths' bazaars.
- 1201 - Construction of new Friday Mosque begins.
- 1221 - City sacked by Mongols.
- 1244 - Shams al-Din Kurt in power.
- 1300 - Herat Citadel reinforced.
- 1364 - Earthquake.
- 1380 - City taken by forces of Timur.

== 15th-19th centuries ==
- 1405 - Capital of Timurid dynasty relocated to Herat from Samarkand.
- 1410 - "Bazaars reconstructed."
- 1425 - Tomb of Khwaja 'Abd Allah Ansari built at Gazurgah (near city).
- 1438 - Gawhar Shad Mausoleum built.
- 1448 - Siege of Herat (1448).
- 1460s - "Royal Canal" built.
- 1469 - Sultan Husayn Mirza Bayqarah in power.
- 1482 - Ikhlasiyya (educational and charitable complex) built outside city (approximate date).
- 1500 - Friday Mosque rebuilt.
- 1507 - Uzbek Muhammad Shaybani in power.
- 1510 - City taken by Safavid Shah Ismail; Shamlu Turkomans in power.
- 1528 - Safavid Shah Tahmasp in power.
- 1716 - Abdali Afghan revolt.
- 1729 - Nader Shah in power.
- 1732 - Afghan revolt suppressed.
- 1750 - City becomes part of the Durrani Empire.
- 1801 - City becomes independent.
- 1807
  - July–August: City is besieged by Iran.
- 1818
  - April: City incorporated into the Durrani Empire. Later that year the Durranis are kicked out of most of Afghanistan, Herat becomes their last stronghold.
- 1837
  - 23 November: Siege of Herat by Persian forces begins.
- 1842
  - Early 1842: Yar Muhammad Khan Alakozai deposes Kamran Shah and becomes the new ruler.
- 1851
  - June 11: Sa'id Muhammad Khan in power.
- 1852
  - March–May: City is briefly occupied by the Persians.
- 1855
  - September 15: Muhammad Yusuf in power.
- 1856
  - April: Persian siege of Herat begins.
  - October 25: Persians take the city of Herat.
- 1857
  - September: Persian control of city ends per Treaty of Paris; Sultan Jan installed as ruler of Herat.
- 1862
  - 27 July: City is besieged by the Muhammadzais.
- 1863
  - 26 May: City taken by forces of Dost Mohammad Khan.
  - Mohammad Yaqub Khan in power.
- 1880 - Abd al-Rahman Khan in power.
- 1885 - Under the orders of the Amir, the Mosalla was destroyed.

== 20th century ==
- 1922 / 1301 SH - Solar Hijri calendar officially adopted in Afghanistan.
- 1925 - Herat National Museum established.
- 1947 - Radio Kabul transmissions begin to reach Herat (approximate date).
- 1960s - Kandahar-Herat highway constructed.
- 1973 - Population: 108,750.
- 1979
  - March: Uprising.
  - City bombed by Soviet forces.
- 1988 - Population: 177,300 (estimate).
- 1993 - Mines cleared.

== 21st century ==
- 2010 - Population: 410,700.
- 2016 - Population: 491,967.

== See also ==
- List of governors of Herat province
- Khorasan
- Timelines of other cities in Afghanistan: Kabul

== Bibliography ==
Published in 19th century

- Jedidiah Morse; Richard C. Morse (1823), "Herat", New Universal Gazetteer (4th ed.), New Haven: S. Converse
- Lal, Mohan (1834). "A Brief Description of Herat". Journal of the Asiatic Society of Bengal. 3: 9–18.
- Narcisse Perrin (1842), "Hérat", L'Afghanistan (in French), Paris: Bertrand
- J.P. Ferrier (1857), "(Herat)", Caravan journeys and wanderings in Persia, Afghanistan, Turkistan, and Beloochistan, translated by W. Jesse (2nd ed.), London: J. Murray
- Muhammad Isfizari (1861–63). Extraits de la chronique persane d'Herat [Extracts from the Persian chronicle of Herat] (in French). Translated by Barbier de Meynard. Paris: Imprimerie impériale.
- Hippisley Cunliffe Marsh (1876). "Description of a Journey Overland to India, via Meshed, Herat, Candahar and the Bolan Pass, in the Year 1872". Proceedings of the Royal Geographical Society of London. 21.
- George Bruce Malleson (1880). Herat: the granary and garden of Central Asia. W.H. Allen & Co.
- Edward Balfour (1885), "Herat", Cyclopaedia of India (3rd ed.), London: B. Quaritch
- C.E. Stewart (1886). "Herat Valley and the Persian Border, from the Hari-Rud to Sistan". Proceedings of the Royal Geographical Society and Monthly Record of Geography. 8 (3): 137–156. doi:10.2307/1800963. JSTOR 1800963.
- Charles Edward Yate (1888), "Herat and its Antiquities", Northern Afghanistan, Edinburgh: W. Blackwood & Sons
- "Herat". Brockhaus' Konversations-Lexikon (in German). Leipzig: Brockhaus. 1896.

Published in 20th century

- Holdich, Thomas Hungerford (1910). "Herat" . Encyclopædia Britannica. Vol. 13 (11th ed.). pp. 330–332.
- Sayfi Harawi (1944). M.S. Siddiqi (ed.). Tarikh-nama-yi Harat (in Persian). Calcutta.
- A. Lezine (1963). "Herat, notes de voyage". Bulletin d'Études Orientales (in French). 18.
- Nancy H. Wolfe (1966). Herat, a pictorial guide.
- Paul English (1973). "The Traditional City of Herat, Afghanistan". In L.C. Brown (ed.). From Medina to Metropolis. Princeton: Darwin Press.
- D. Brandenburg (1977). Herat: eine timuridische Hauptstadt (in German). Graz.
- A.W. Najimi (1988). Herat, the Islamic City: A Study in Urban Conservation. London.
- Rafi Samizay (1989). "Herat: Pearl of Khurasan". Environmental Design: Journal of the Islamic Environmental Design Research Centre (1–2). Archived from the original on 24 December 2007.
- Felicia J. Hecker (1993). "A Fifteenth-Century Chinese Diplomat in Herat". Journal of the Royal Asiatic Society. 3.
- Olivier Tirard-Collet (1998). "After the War: the Condition of Historical Buildings and Monuments in Herat, Afghanistan". Iran. 36.
- Jurgen Paul (2000). "The Histories of Herat". Iranian Studies. 33 (1–2): 93–115. doi:10.1080/00210860008701977. S2CID 162247245.

Published in 21st century

- Josef W. Meri, ed. (2006). "Herat". Medieval Islamic Civilization. Routledge. ISBN 978-0-415-96691-7.
- C. Edmund Bosworth, ed. (2007). "Herat". Historic Cities of the Islamic World. Leiden: Koninklijke Brill. ISBN 978-9004153882.
- Michael R.T. Dumper; Bruce E. Stanley, eds. (2008), "Herat", Cities of the Middle East and North Africa, Santa Barbara, USA: ABC-CLIO
- "Herat". Grove Encyclopedia of Islamic Art & Architecture. Oxford University Press. 2009.
