= American University of Afghanistan attack =

2016 terrorist attack

- Part of the War in Afghanistan
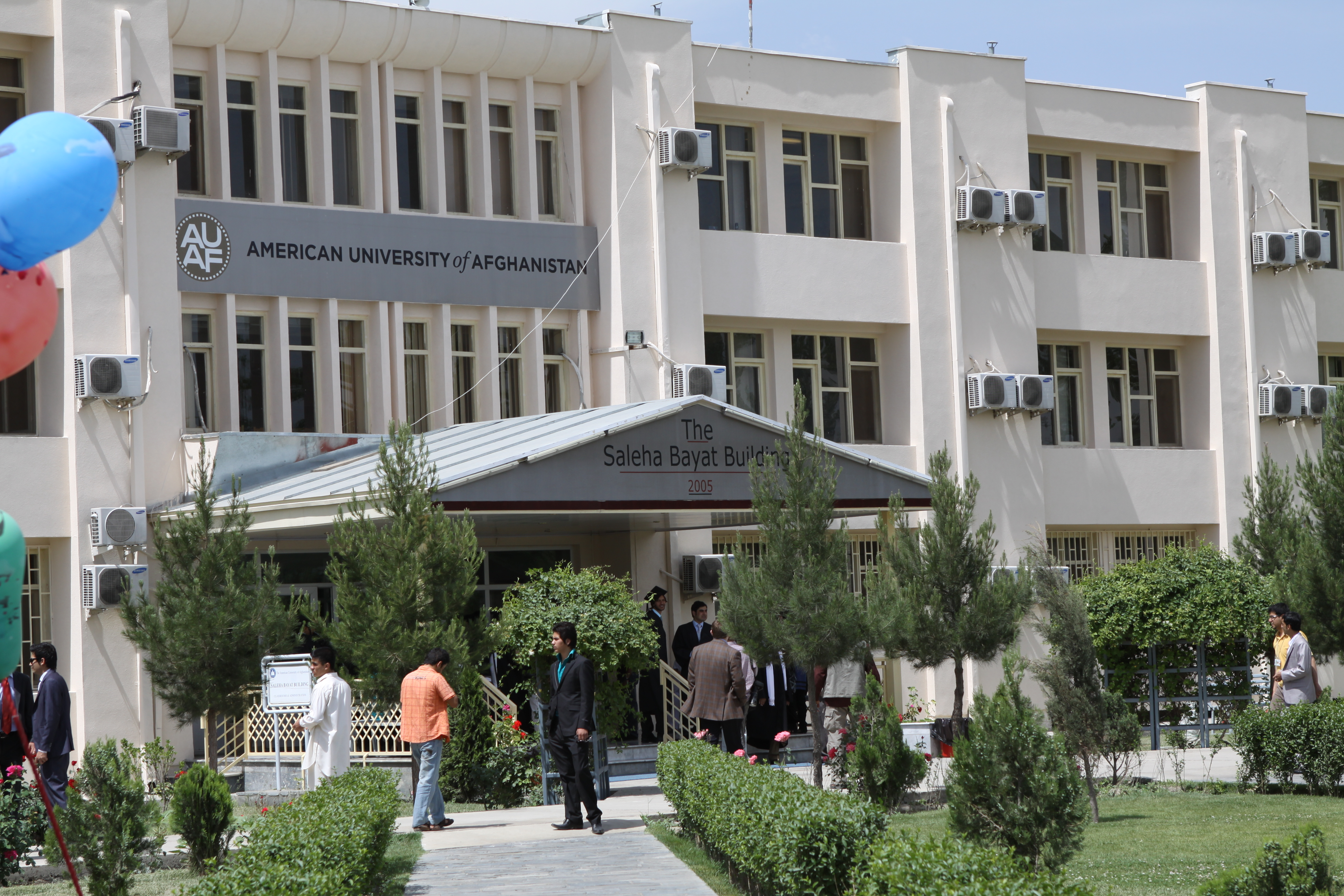
- The American University of Afghanistan
- Location: 34°28′32″N 69°7′34″W; American University of Afghanistan, Kabul, Kabul Province, Islamic Republic of Afghanistan
- Date: 24 August 2016; Approximately 7:00 p.m. - 5:00 a.m. (UTC+04:30)
- Target: University students & workers
- Attack type: Car bombings, mass shootings, school shooting
- Weapons: Truck bomb, guns
- Deaths: 17 (+3 attackers)
- Injuries: 53+
- Defenders: Security guards at the university and nearby educational institutions; Policemen; Afghan Special Forces assisted by the International Security Assistance Force

On 24 August 2016, attackers who are suspected members of the Taliban stormed the American University of Afghanistan in Kabul, Afghanistan, using a car bomb and automatic weapons. Thirteen people were killed, including seven university students, one policeman, three security guards at the university, a university professor (Naqib Ahmad Khpulwak) and Faculty of Computer Science (Omer Farooq Hazarbuz) was badly injured. Fifty to at least 53 people were injured, some critically. Three of the attackers were killed by Afghan Special Forces. This was the first direct attack on the university, although two professors were kidnapped just outside the university a few weeks earlier.

== Background ==
Afghanistan had been experiencing a significant amount of terror attacks during the War in Afghanistan, including the large July 2016 Kabul bombing. In the past, incidents related to employees at the American University of Afghanistan include a terror attack on a restaurant in which around 21 people were killed, including two AUAF employees, and a kidnapping of two foreign professors by men dressed in Afghan National Police uniforms on August 7. American special forces later failed in an operation to try to rescue them.

The American University of Afghanistan was chartered in 2004 and established in 2006. It is an "Independent, self-governing, not-for-profit university operating on the US liberal arts model". Founded by Dr. Sharif Fayez, it is Afghanistan's "top institution for higher education", with many foreign employees, and is supported in part by prominent U.S. politicians.

== Attack ==
The attack began at 19:03 during the evening classes at the university, when around 700 students were in attendance. The university was surrounded by a fortified wall. A truck filled with explosives was driven up to the wall and blown up, leaving a large hole in the wall. Two assailants then entered the compound, prompting employees and students to panic while fleeing and hiding. A nearly ten-hour-long siege then ensued, which lasted overnight. Hundreds of trapped students "pleaded for help" as an explosion followed gunshots, some sending messages on Twitter. Students used furniture in the classroom to barricade doors, with others making a "mad scramble to escape through windows" while pushing each other out, some from dangerous heights.

Afghan National Army troops belonging to an elite unit led operations to secure the campus while exchanging gunfire with the assailants. United States led military coalition foreign troops assisted in the operations, including mentors from the Norwegian Special forces group Marinejegerkommandoen to rescue the 200 students trapped inside the school. Associated Press and Agence France-Presse photographer Massoud Hossaini was stuck and wounded inside the university and tweeted updates, along with other reporters such as CBS producer Ahmad Mukhtar.

During the chaos, seven university students, one policeman, three security guards at the university, and one university professor were killed. A guard from a neighboring vocational school for visually impaired people was also killed. Most people were killed from bullets that traveled through windows. At least 50 to at least 53 people were also injured.

== Aftermath ==
The Taliban was suspected to be behind the attack but has not yet claimed responsibility. The Islamic State of Iraq and the Levant is also a suspect.

Laura Bush, a major supporter of the university, denounced the attack along with the U.S. State Department and offered her condolences. She also issued a statement.

The American University of Afghanistan temporarily closed indefinitely "in the wake of the despicable terrorist attack on the university". University President Mark English was interviewed on the American National Public Radio. The university also issued a statement:

“American University of Afghanistan is dedicated to its educational mission in service to Afghanistan and has no intention of giving in to terror. As our faculty member Naqib Ahmad Khpulwak, who was killed in this attack, had said, those who care about the future of Afghanistan cannot back down to insurgents and criminals who threaten a future of possibility. Our firm resolve is to move forward,”

— American University of Afghanistan, University World News

AUAF English professor Raj Chandarlapaty reflected on the challenging plight of the university:

“There are no easy answers for them. They have the philosophy, ‘We’re not going to surrender, we’re not going to give in to terrorism.’”

The university reopened in March 2017.

== See also ==
- List of terrorist incidents in August 2016
- July 2016 Kabul bombing
- September 2016 Kabul bombing
- List of terrorist attacks in Kabul
