= 2019 Ghazni bombing =

Suicide bomb attack in Ghazni

- Ghazni (Afghanistan)
- Location: Ghazni, Afghanistan
- Date: 7 July 2019
- Attack type: Suicide car bomb
- Deaths: 14 (+1 perpetrator)
- Injuries: 180
- Perpetrator: Taliban

A suicide car bombing occurred in Ghazni, Afghanistan on 7 July 2019. It killed 14 people and injured another 180. The Taliban has claimed responsibility for the attack.

== See also ==
- July 2019 Kabul attack (disambiguation)
