= 2018 Inter-Continental Hotel Kabul attack =

Attack in Afghanistan

- Part of the War in Afghanistan
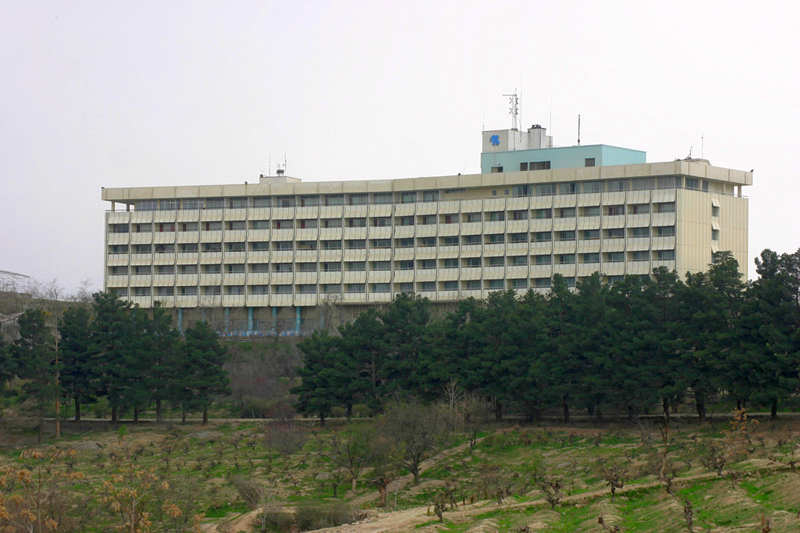
- The Hotel Inter-Continental Kabul, where the attack took place
- Location: 34°32′13″N 69°07′31″E; Kabul, Afghanistan
- Date: 20 January 2018
- Target: Foreign citizens and Afghan government officials
- Attack type: Shooting, hostage taking, arson
- Deaths: 40 (+6 attackers)
- Injuries: 14
- Perpetrator: Taliban

On 20 January 2018, a group of four or five gunmen attacked the Inter-Continental Hotel in Kabul, Afghanistan, sparking a 12-hour battle. The attack left 40 people dead including 14 foreigners, while 14 others were injured.

== Background ==
Kabul was held by the NATO-supported Afghan government, though both the Taliban and Islamic State were able to launch destructive attacks on the capital in the preceding months, including a suicide bombing less than a month prior to the Inter-Continental raid.

== Attack ==
On 20 January 2018, around 21:00 local time gunmen armed with light weapons and rocket-propelled grenades stormed the Inter-Continental Hotel in Kabul, opening fire and taking hostages. It is believed the gunmen targeted foreigners.

Some hotel guests tried to escape the gunmen by tying bed sheets together and climbing down from the upper floors of the building, which was partially set on fire. Afghan special forces were lowered by helicopters onto the hotel's roof in an attempt to neutralize the attackers. Later, soldiers from the Afghan National Army with the assistance of Norwegian special forces from the Marinejegerkommandoen responded to the attack and exchanged gunfire with gunmen in the hotel.

Afghan officials said the attack was over by the morning hours of 21 January, with four attackers and at least 18 others killed, including 14 foreigners. More than 160 people had been rescued from the hotel, while a number of others remained missing. These included 16 employees of Afghan airline Kam Air, which announced that 11 out of the 42 people working for the company who had been present were killed during the attack, while 15 others survived.

=== Aftermath ===
At least two senior Afghan officials said that Afghanistan's intelligence agency had reports that the Pakistan-based Haqqani network, an arm of the Taliban, was responsible for the attack. The Taliban later claimed responsibility for the attack in a statement, warning Afghan civilians to avoid locations frequented by foreigners. Weeks prior to the attack, U.S. President Donald Trump suspended military aid to Pakistan accusing it of providing a safe haven for terrorist groups who launched attacks in Afghanistan. On January 22, Trump pressured Pakistan to expel the Taliban and Haqqani leaders.

The Afghan interior ministry said a private firm had taken responsibility for securing the Intercontinental Hotel around three weeks before. The ministry said it was investigating how the attackers had managed to enter the building. Thirty-four provincial officials were gathered at the hotel to participate in a conference organized by the Telecommunication Ministry. An official at that ministry said that more than 100 IT managers and engineers were on site when the attack took place.

Members of the Afghan parliament criticized the fact that the hotel's security was in the hands of a private company. Parliament announced plans to hold a special session regarding the issue.

=== Victims ===
Nationality	Deaths	Wounded	Total	Ref.
Afghanistan	25	12	37	
Ukraine	7	0	7	
United States	4	2	6	
Venezuela	2	0	2	
Germany	1	0	1	
Kazakhstan	1	0	1	
Total	40	14	54	

== See also ==
- 2011 Inter-Continental Hotel Kabul attack
- Kabul ambulance bombing
- List of terrorist attacks in Kabul
