= 6 March 2020 Kabul shooting =

Terrorist attack in Afghanistan

2020 Kabul shooting
- Part of the War in Afghanistan (2001–2021)
- 6 March 2020 Kabul shooting (Afghanistan)
- Location: Kabul, Afghanistan
- Date: 6 March 2020; 6 years ago (AFT (UTC+04:30))
- Target: Politicians
- Attack type: Missile, shootings
- Deaths: 32
- Injuries: 82
- Perpetrator: Islamic State of Iraq and the Levant – Khorasan Province

On 6 March 2020, a mass shooting occurred in Kabul, Afghanistan. Two gunmen fired from a building under construction, killing 32 people and injuring another 82. The terrorist attack happened during a ceremony to commemorate the 25th anniversary of the assassination by the Taliban of Afghan Shia leader Abdul Ali Mazari. The ceremony was attended by Afghan politician Abdullah Abdullah, who escaped unharmed. The two gunmen were killed later the same day. The Islamic State of Iraq and the Levant claimed responsibility for the attack.

== See also ==
- List of terrorist incidents linked to Islamic State – Khorasan Province
- List of terrorist attacks in Kabul
