= 2015 Kabul Parliament attack =

2015 Taliban attack on the National Assembly building in Kabul, Afghanistan

Kabul Parliament attack
- Part of the 2015 War in Afghanistan
- Kabul (Afghanistan)
- Location: Kabul, Afghanistan
- Date: June 22, 2015
- Target: National Assembly
- Attack type: Car bombing, mass shooting
- Weapons: AK-47 assault rifles RPG launchers
- Deaths: 9 total 2 civilian 7 Taliban
- Injuries: 40 (civilian)
- Perpetrator: Taliban
- Motive: Attack targeting new defense minister Mohammed Masoom Stanekzai

The 2015 Kabul Parliament attack occurred on June 22, 2015, when members of the Taliban detonated a car bomb outside the National Assembly in Kabul then attacked the building with assault rifles and RPGs. Two civilians and seven Taliban died in the attack.

== Background ==
In 2014, the US and NATO powers withdrew most of their combat troops, leaving 13,000 troops in the Resolute Support Mission to continue serving in an advisory and counter-terror capacity. From 2015 onwards, the ongoing war against the Taliban insurgency has been fought primarily by the Afghan security forces. ISIL, which has taken territory in Iraq, has declared their support for the Taliban, carrying out a suicide bomb attack in Jalalabad in April that killed more than 30 people and injured 100 others.

The attack came amid intensifying Taliban attacks around the Northern city of Kunduz, as part of a major offensive in an attempt to capture the city. Tens of thousands of inhabitants have been displaced internally in Afghanistan by the fighting. The Kunduz province has been a region of heavy fighting from 2009 onwards.

== The attack ==
A Taliban fighter driving a car loaded with explosives managed to get through security checkpoints before detonating the vehicle outside the parliament's gates. Six Taliban insurgents with AK-47 rifles and RPGs took up positions in a construction site nearby. Members of Parliament were evacuated to safety, while security forces battled the insurgents in a two-hour gun battle. Afghan Interior Ministry spokesman Sediq Sediqqi said all seven attackers were killed by police and no MPs were wounded.

== Casualties and responsibility ==
The UN mission in Afghanistan says a woman and a child were killed in the attack, and 40 civilians were injured.

Taliban spokesman Zabiullah Mujahid claimed responsibility for the attack, saying that it was timed to coincide with a parliamentary speech of the new defense minister Mohammed Masoom Stanekzai.

Lt. Gen. Abdul Rahman Rahimi, Kabul's Chief of Police, says that the police will investigate how the attackers got so close to parliament.

== See also ==
- 2015 Park Palace guesthouse attack
- February 2010 Kabul attack
- War in Afghanistan (2015–2021)
- Withdrawal of U.S. troops from Afghanistan (2011–2016)
- List of terrorist incidents, 2015
- List of terrorist attacks in Kabul
