= 17 August 2019 Kabul bombing =

Suicide bombing at a wedding in Kabul

- Part of the War in Afghanistan (2001–2021) and Persecution of Shias by the Islamic State
- Bombing site (Afghanistan) Bombing site (Kabul)
- Location: 34.5007°N 69.1452°E; Kabul, Afghanistan
- Date: 17 August 2019; 10:40 p.m. (AFT; UTC+04:30)
- Target: Shia Hazara civilians
- Attack type: Suicide bombing
- Weapon: Explosive belt
- Deaths: 92
- Injuries: 182
- Perpetrator: Islamic State of Iraq and the Levant – Khorasan Province
- Motive: Anti-Shi'ism

On 17 August 2019, a suicide bombing took place during a wedding in a wedding hall in Kabul, Afghanistan. At least 92 people were killed in the attack and over 140 injured. The Islamic State of Iraq and the Levant claimed responsibility for the bombing, stating that the attack targeted the Shi'ites. More than 1,000 people were gathered for the wedding when the attack took place. The attack occurred a day before the 100th Afghan Independence Day, causing the government to postpone the planned celebrations taking place at the Darul Aman Palace. It was the deadliest attack in Kabul since January 2018.

== Attack ==
The suicide bombing occurred at approximately 10:40 p.m. Afghanistan Time (UTC+04:30) in western Kabul, in an area heavily populated by the Shia Hazara minority, inside the "Dubai City" wedding hall. The suicide bomber detonated the explosives in the men's section of the wedding hall, near the stage where musicians were playing, at a time when hundreds were inside the building for a wedding ceremony. The bomber detonated a suicide vest packed with ball bearings.

The explosion occurred shortly before the wedding ceremony was supposed to start. According to the wedding hall's owner, more than 1,200 people had been invited to the event, with a mixed group of Shi'ites and Sunnis attending. Most of the attendees were ethnic Hazaras. Both the bride and the groom were Shi'ite, and both from modest working class families, with the groom working as a tailor. Their families had discussed how to schedule the timing of the wedding to try to minimize the risk of an attack.

At least 63 people were initially killed and 182 injured. While the bride and groom survived, both lost several family members. Many children were also among those killed. 17 more people succumbed to their injuries in the days after the attack, bringing the death toll to 80. The final death toll was put at 92.

== Responsibility ==
The day after the attack, a local affiliate of the Islamic State of Iraq and the Levant (ISIL, also known as ISIS, the Islamic State, or Daesh) claimed responsibility for the attack. The statement of responsibility claimed that after the suicide bombing inside the wedding hall, a car bomb was also detonated outside as emergency vehicles were arriving. The follow-up car bombing has not been confirmed by the authorities.

The Taliban denied responsibility for the attack, with a spokesman stating that the Taliban "condemns [the bombing] in the strongest terms".

== Reactions ==
=== Domestic ===
President of Afghanistan Ashraf Ghani declared a day of mourning. He also stated that the Taliban can not fully escape blame for the attack either, saying that "The Taliban cannot absolve themselves of blame for they provide platform for terrorists."

The Taliban denied responsibility for the attack and condemned it. The group's spokesperson Zabiullah Mujahid said in a statement that the group "strongly condemns explosion [sic] targeting civilians inside a hotel in Kabul city," while also adding that "Such barbaric deliberate attacks against civilians including women and children are forbidden and unjustifiable."

== See also ==
- List of terrorist incidents linked to Islamic State – Khorasan Province
- Islamic State of Iraq and the Levant – Khorasan Province
- Persecution of Hazara people
- List of terrorist attacks in Kabul
