= 2015 Spanish Embassy attack in Kabul =

Attack at the Spanish Embassy

- Part of the Taliban insurgency
- 2015 Spanish Embassy attack in Kabul (Kabul)
- Location: Shir Pur, Kabul, Afghanistan
- Date: 11 December 2015
- Attack type: Suicide bombing, Raid
- Deaths: 9 (including 3 perpetrators)
- Injuries: 7
- Perpetrator: Taliban

On 11 December 2015, Taliban militants detonated a car bomb and stormed a guesthouse near the Spanish embassy in the Shirpour district of Kabul, Afghanistan—home to many foreign embassies and high-ranking government officials. Nine people died in the attack, including four Afghans, two Spanish military policemen and three Taliban fighters. Security forces, including Norwegian special forces, took more than ten hours to bring the area back under control.

The Taliban claimed responsibility for the attack.

In October 2016, a member of the Norwegian Marinejegerkommandoen was awarded a medal for saving lives of Spanish diplomats during the incident. The soldier was shot three times during the incident. The medal was handed out at the Spanish embassy in Oslo, Norway by the Spanish ambassador to Norway.

== See also ==
- War in Afghanistan (2001–present)
- List of terrorist incidents, 2015
- List of terrorist attacks in Kabul
