= Kabul ambulance bombing =

2018 terrorist attack in Kabul, Afghanistan

- Part of the War in Afghanistan
- Blast site (Kabul) Blast site (Afghanistan)
- Location: 34°31′37″N 69°10′09″E; Kabul, Afghanistan
- Date: 27 January 2018 (UTC+04:30)
- Attack type: Suicide car bombing
- Weapon: Bomb
- Deaths: 103
- Injuries: 235
- Perpetrator: Taliban

On 27 January 2018, an ambulance was used as a vehicle-borne improvised explosive device near Sidarat Square in Kabul, Afghanistan. At least 103 people were killed and 235 others wounded in the attack. The Taliban claimed responsibility for the attack.

== Bombing ==
On 27 January 2018, insurgents blew up an explosives-packed ambulance near an interior ministry building on a busy and heavily-guarded street in the Afghan capital Kabul during rush hour. The bombers detonated the explosives while passing through the second in a series of checkpoints near Kabul's embassies and government buildings including the European Union embassies. The explosion was so powerful that the shock was felt around the capital, collapsing buildings and destroying façades in the immediate area. The Jamhuriat Hospital, government offices, businesses and a school are close to the site of the blast. It was the third major attack in seven days, following shootings at an aid agency in Jalalabad, Nangarhar Province, and at the Inter-Continental Hotel in Kabul. Officials confirmed that the bomb was hidden in the ambulance and detonated at a second police checkpoint. Its blast also destroyed vehicles, shops, and buildings nearby.

The attack occurred on a street, locally known as Chicken Street, near a building run by the Interior Ministry. Various government agencies have offices there and the road had security checkpoints in place. The coordinator for the Italian aid group Emergency that operates a trauma center described the event as a "massacre". According to reports, the vehicle was stopped at a second security checkpoint after passing the primary one claiming they had a patient. When police attempted to stop the vehicle from going further, the driver detonated the bomb. Relatives were reported to be queuing at the city morgue. The scene of the attack was described as one of carnage with shattered bodies, many unidentifiable, lying all over.

=== Perpetrators ===
The Taliban claimed responsibility for the attack. The Afghan government described it as a crime against humanity, and accused Pakistan of providing support to the attackers. Pakistan denies supporting militants carrying out attacks in Afghanistan.

== Aftermath ==
The third major attack in Afghanistan within a week, President Ashraf Ghani again blamed Pakistan for failing to move against Taliban terrorists. Ghani vowed revenge against the Taliban in retaliation. In addition, Ghani sent an Afghan intelligence delegation to Pakistan to hand over "undeniable" evidence that the terrorists of the bombing were planning the attack within Pakistan. Peace prospects with the Taliban also took a downward turn following increasing outrage over the attacks, with a presidential spokesman saying that the Taliban "has lost the opportunity for peace talks". The use of an ambulance to deliver the bomb was described as an act of perfidy by the International Committee of the Red Cross.

== See also ==
- List of terrorist attacks in Kabul
