= December 2014 Kabul bombings =

Series of bombings in Afghanistan

- Part of the Taliban insurgency
- Kabul (Afghanistan)
- Location: Kabul, Afghanistan
- Date: December 11, 2014
- Attack type: Suicide bombing
- Deaths: 12
- Injuries: 7
- Perpetrator: Taliban

The December 2014 Kabul bombings refer to series of bombings that happened on December 11, 2014, in Kabul, Afghanistan.

== First attack ==
The first attack was carried out by the Taliban and was targeting Afghan soldiers. During the attack six of the soldiers were killed.

== Second attack ==
A couple of hours later a second attack was carried out by a 16-year-old who blew himself up at the French high school's auditorium which killed 6 civilians and wounded 16 more. The auditorium was showing a play called Heartbeat: Silence After the Explosion which ironized the event. After the explosion there was a panic which was followed by an investigation during which the witnesses claimed that it all happened back stage with reporters and their TV cameras were covering the event. The Taliban have claimed responsibility for this attack as well, and said that the play undermined Islamic values. According to BBC reporter Mike Wooldridge, the attack was meant to undermine confidence among Afghans in the new government and its security forces.

After the investigation it was revealed by the Afghan Deputy Interior Minister Mohammad Ayoub Salangi that one of the bodies belonged to a German national.

== Condemnations ==
The attack was condemned by the Laurent Fabius who said that no French citizens were hurt in the attack. It was also condemned by French President Francois Hollande who called it "odd" and was quoting saying by U-T San Diego:

By attacking this target, the terrorists were targeting culture and creativity

== See also ==
- List of terrorist attacks in Kabul
