= Raj Chandarlapaty =

- Born: Raj Chandarlapaty; May 12, 1970 (age 56); Toronto, Ontario, Canada
- Citizenship: United States
- Education: University of South Florida
- Occupations: Educator and author
- Spouse: Sujatha Vaddadi Rao
- Writing career
- Language: English
- Subject: Beat literature
- Notable works: Seeing the Beat Generation (2019); Re-creating Paul Bowles, the Other, and the Imagination (2014); The Beat Generation and Counterculture (2009)

Raj Chandarlapaty (born May 12, 1970) is an American educator and author. Chandarlapaty is a product of the American philological tradition and has researched the contributions of Jack Kerouac and William S. Burroughs. His archival research, including previously unconsidered letters, "places them and their work in a context much larger and diverse than heretofore considered."

== Bibliography ==
- Psychedelic Modernism: Literature and Film. (Wilmington, DE: Vernon Press, 2024)
- 'The Hipster'. From McKinley, Maggie, ed, Norman Mailer in Context (New York: Cambridge University Press, 2021), 193–201.
- Seeing the Beat Generation: Entering the Literature through Film (Jefferson, NC: McFarland & Company, 2019)
- Re-creating Paul Bowles, the Other, and the Imagination: Music, Film, and Photography (London: Lexington Books, 2014)
- The Beat Generation and Counterculture: Paul Bowles, William S. Burroughs, Jack Kerouac (New York: Peter Lang, 2009)
