= 28 July 2019 Kabul suicide bombing =

Car bombing in Afghanistan

- Kabul location
- Location: Kabul, Afghanistan
- Date: July 28, 2019
- Target: Amrullah Saleh
- Attack type: Shooting, suicide bombing
- Deaths: 20+
- Injuries: 50
- Perpetrator: Unknown

On 28 July 2019, a suicide car bombing occurred in the Kabul office of the Vice Presidential candidate Amrullah Saleh. The bombing killed over 20 and injured over 50, including slightly wounding Saleh. Four gunmen then stormed the building and laid siege for hours before being killed.

== Casualties ==
Twenty people were killed, and 50 others wounded, including Amrullah Saleh who was slightly injured in the blast.

== Responsibility of the attack ==
There was no immediate claim of responsibility for the attack but ISIL and the Taliban both frequently carry out attacks in this region.

== See also ==
- 1 July 2019 Kabul attack
- List of terrorist attacks in Kabul
