= 2020 Kabul gurdwara attack =

Terrorist attack in Kabul, Afghanistan on 25 March 2020

Kabul gurdwara attack
- Part of the War in Afghanistan (2001–2021)
- 2020 Kabul gurdwara attack (Kabul)
- Location: 34.512°N 69.187°E; Gurdwara Har Rai Sahib, Shor Bazaar, Kabul, Afghanistan
- Date: 25 March 2020; 07:45 – 14:00 (AFT (UTC+04:30))
- Target: Sikhs
- Attack type: Shooting, suicide bombings
- Deaths: 25
- Injuries: 8+
- Perpetrators: Joint cell of Islamic State of Iraq and the Levant – Khorasan Province and Haqqani network members
- Assailant: Abu Khalid al-Hindi

On 25 March 2020, ISIS gunmen and suicide bombers attacked the Gurdwara Har Rai Sahib (a Sikh shrine) in Kabul, Afghanistan.

About 200 Sikh worshipers were reported to be in the building at the time, of which 25 worshippers were killed and at least 8 wounded after an hour-long siege which ended in all assailants being killed by the security forces. At least one child was said to have been among those killed, according to the ministry of interior's statement.

The Islamic extremist and militant organization Islamic State of Iraq and the Levant (ISIL) had claimed responsibility of perpetrating the attack. The gunmen were identified as Abu Khalid al-Hindi and Murshid Mohammed T. K. J. both Indian citizens from the state of Kerala. Abu Khalid al-Hindi, whose real name is Mohammed Sajid Kuthirummal "Mohammed Muhasin" hails from Kasargod in Kerala, India.

== Attack ==
The attacks started in the gurdwara's sanctuary area where 200 worshipers were praying at about 7:45 am interrupting worship that started an hour earlier. The attackers threw grenades and broke into the shrine then started opening fire on people. Afterwards, the attackers took hostages inside of the building, exchanging fire with security forces till all three attackers were killed and at least 80 hostages freed after a shootout that lasted for 6 hours. After the attack, Afghan and NATO soldiers helped with the clearance operation.

On Thursday, as families of the deceased and members of the community were conveying the bodies to the burial grounds in the Qalacha area in the afternoon, another blast was reported to have gone off remotely, near the crowd. There were no casualties from the blast.

This was not the first such attack on Sikhs; a similar Islamic State attack on Sikhs killed many in Jalalabad in 2018. Gurdwaras have also been damaged previously, such as during the Battle of Jalalabad (1989) and the Afghan Civil War of the 1990s.

== Perpetrator ==
Initial government reports suggested that Ashraf Ghani's government blamed Haqqani network for the attack, but Taliban denied its role. Shortly after, the SITE Intelligence Group announced that the Islamic State of Iraq and the Levant – Khorasan Province claimed responsibility right after the attack through various social media accounts. The gunman was identified as Abu Khalid al-Hindi, an Indian citizen from Padne in the Kasargod district of Kerala state. An Indian source revealed al-Hindi was wanted in a 2016 NIA case, and had previously worked as a shopkeeper in his native town. The Afghan NDS said the perpetrator left India in 2018 to join ISIS Khorasan in Afghanistan. Indian intelligence agencies identified him as Mohammed Sajid Kuthirummal.

In a communique, the ISIS said the attack was carried out in response to the "Indian government's actions in Jammu and Kashmir". The attack mastermind and ISIS-K emir Abdullah Orakzai, alias Aslam Farooqi, was captured by the National Directorate of Security on 4 April along with 19 others.

The Afghan National Directorate of Security in April arrested a group of eight that included operatives from both ISIS-K and Haqqani network. Another five members were killed in the raid which happened in Kabul. The group was involved in many attacks including on the gurdwara, the rocket attack on a ceremony during which Ashraf Ghani was sworn in as the President in March 2020 and a rocket attack on Bagram Airfield in April. It was reported that one of the arrested ISIS militants was linked to Pakistan's ISI.

== Casualties ==
This assault resulted in the death of 25 civilians including one child, while another eight were wounded according to the ministry of interior's statement.

One of those who died in the attack is Tian Singh, a 71-year old Indian citizen from Delhi whose family members demanded that his remains should be brought to India.

== Reactions ==
The attack was condemned by multiple people worldwide including;

- India's Prime Minister Narendra Modi who said: "I am saddened by the terror attack at the Gurudwara in Kabul. I express my condolences to the families of all the deceased".
- India's Defence Minister Rajnath Singh tweeted on Twitter saying: "The terrorist attack on a Sikh Gurudwara in Kabul is extremely reprehensible. My heart goes out to the families of those who have lost their loved ones in this heinous act against humanity. I also pray for the speedy recovery of the injured".
- Afghanistan Ministry Spokesman tweeted saying: "The enemy has once again exposed its savage character by launching today's terrorist attacks on our dear countrymen. Terrorists will surely be punished."
- Amnesty International South Asia tweeted: "We are shocked and disheartened to see the attack against the Sikh minority today in Kabul. They are a small religious community in Afghanistan who were persecuted by the Taliban when the [group] was in power. The authorities have a responsibility to protect minorities and their places of worship in Afghanistan. The suspected perpetrators must be held accountable through fair trials without recourse to the death penalty."
- Pakistan Ministry of Foreign Affairs made a statement highlighting: "Such despicable attacks have no political, religious or moral justification and must be rejected outright."
- U.N. Secretary-General António Guterres said: "Attacks against civilians are unacceptable and those who carry out such crimes must be held accountable".
- External Affairs Ministry of India said: "We convey our sincerest condolences to the immediate family members of the deceased and wish speedy recovery to the injured, India stands ready to extend all possible assistance to the affected families of the Hindu and Sikh community of Afghanistan."
- United States Secretary of State Mike Pompeo said: "I want to address the ISIS-K claimed attack in Afghanistan. The United States condemns the horrific ISIS-K claimed attack on a Sikh temple and community center in Kabul this morning which took the lives of more than two dozen innocent people. The Afghan people deserve a future free from ISIS-K and other terrorist activity."
- Afghanistan President Ashraf Ghani condemned the attack saying: "The attack on the religious sites shows the extreme weakness of the enemy, religious sites should not be vulnerable to attacks and violence."
- Acting Secretary of State for South and Central Asia, Alice Wells tweeted: "The US condemns in the strongest possible terms the horrific ISIS-claimed attack on a Sikh temple and community centre in Kabul today. We mourn the deceased and will hold the wounded, their families, and their community close to our hearts."

== See also ==
- July 2018 Jalalabad suicide bombing
- List of terrorist incidents linked to Islamic State – Khorasan Province
- List of terrorist attacks in Kabul
