= 11 June 2013 Kabul bombing =

Terrorist attack in Afghanistan

June 2013 Kabul bombings
- Part of the Taliban insurgency
- Kabul (Afghanistan)
- Location: Supreme Court of Afghanistan, Kabul
- Date: 11 June 2013
- Target: Court employees
- Attack type: Suicide bombing
- Deaths: 17
- Injuries: 39
- Perpetrator: Taliban

A suicide bomb attack took place on the Supreme Court of Afghanistan in Kabul on 11 June 2013. At least 16 people died and 40 others were injured.

== Attack ==
The perpetrator drove a car filled with explosives into buses which were carrying court employees including judges. The Taliban took responsibility for the attack, saying that they delivered a blow to judges who obeyed Western powers. The attack came a day after militants attacked Kabul International Airport.

== Reactions ==
- Afghanistan President Hamid Karzai condemned the attack, saying, "it was another terrorist act that once again shows the Taliban are serving the enemies of Islam".
- UN Secretary-General Ban Ki-moon condemned the attack, stating, "Targeted attacks against civilians are unacceptable and a serious breach of international humanitarian law".

== See also ==
- List of terrorist attacks in Kabul
