= 10 August 2015 Kabul suicide bombing =

Explosive attack in Afghanistan

- Part of the Taliban insurgency
- 10 August 2015 Kabul suicide bombing (Kabul) The International Airport within Kabul
- Location: Kabul International Airport Kabul, Afghanistan
- Date: 10 August 2015; 11:20 am local time
- Attack type: Suicide bombing
- Deaths: 5
- Injuries: 16
- Perpetrator: Taliban

On 10 August 2015, a suicide bombing occurred in the Kabul International Airport street, near the entrance to Kabul Airport, killing 5 people and wounding 16 people. This occurred days after a series of suicide attacks in the Afghan capital killed dozens and wounded hundreds.

The bombing occurred when a suicide bomber drove a vehicle into the first checkpoint on the road into the airport. The people that died included four civilians and a child.

The Taliban claimed responsibility for the attack, and said it was intended to target a group of foreigners.

== See also ==
- War in Afghanistan (2001–present)
- List of terrorist incidents, 2015
- List of terrorist attacks in Kabul
