= 17 September 2019 Afghanistan bombings =

Suicide bombings in Charikar and Kabul, Afghanistan

- Part of War in Afghanistan (2001–present)
- 17 September 2019 Afghanistan bombings (Afghanistan)
- Location: Charikar and Kabul, Afghanistan
- Date: 17 September 2019
- Attack type: Suicide bombings
- Deaths: 26 (Charikar); 22 (Kabul); Total: 48 (+2)
- Injuries: 42 (Charikar); 38 (Kabul); Total: 80
- Perpetrator: Taliban

On 17 September 2019, two suicide bombings killed over 48 people in Charikar and Kabul, Afghanistan. The first attack occurred at a rally for president Ashraf Ghani which killed over 26 and wounded over 42. Ghani was unharmed in the incident. The second bombing occurred in Kabul near the US embassy. In this incident 22 were killed and another 38 were injured in the explosion. Children and women were among the dead and wounded in both attacks.

== Attacks ==
=== Charikar ===
The attack took place in Charikar, at a police training ground. At the time, Afghan president Ashraf Ghani was holding a political rally at the site, attended by thousands of people. A suicide bomber riding a motorcycle drove into a crowd near a security checkpoint and detonated his explosives. 26 people and the bomber were killed, and 42 others injured. Women and children were among the victims of the attack. President Ghani was unharmed in the attack, remaining protected by a secure compound about half a mile from the site of the blast.

=== Kabul ===
A few hours after the first attack, a second suicide bombing took place in Massoud Square near the Kabul Green Zone, in an area where several government buildings, the US embassy and NATO headquarters, are located. 22 people were killed in this attack and 38 injured.

== Responsibility ==
The Taliban claimed responsibility for both attacks, and stated that the attacks were aimed at disrupting the Afghan presidential election, scheduled to take place on 28 September.

== See also ==
- List of terrorist attacks in Kabul
