= April 2012 Afghanistan attacks =

Suicide bombing and Taliban attacks

- Part of War in Afghanistan
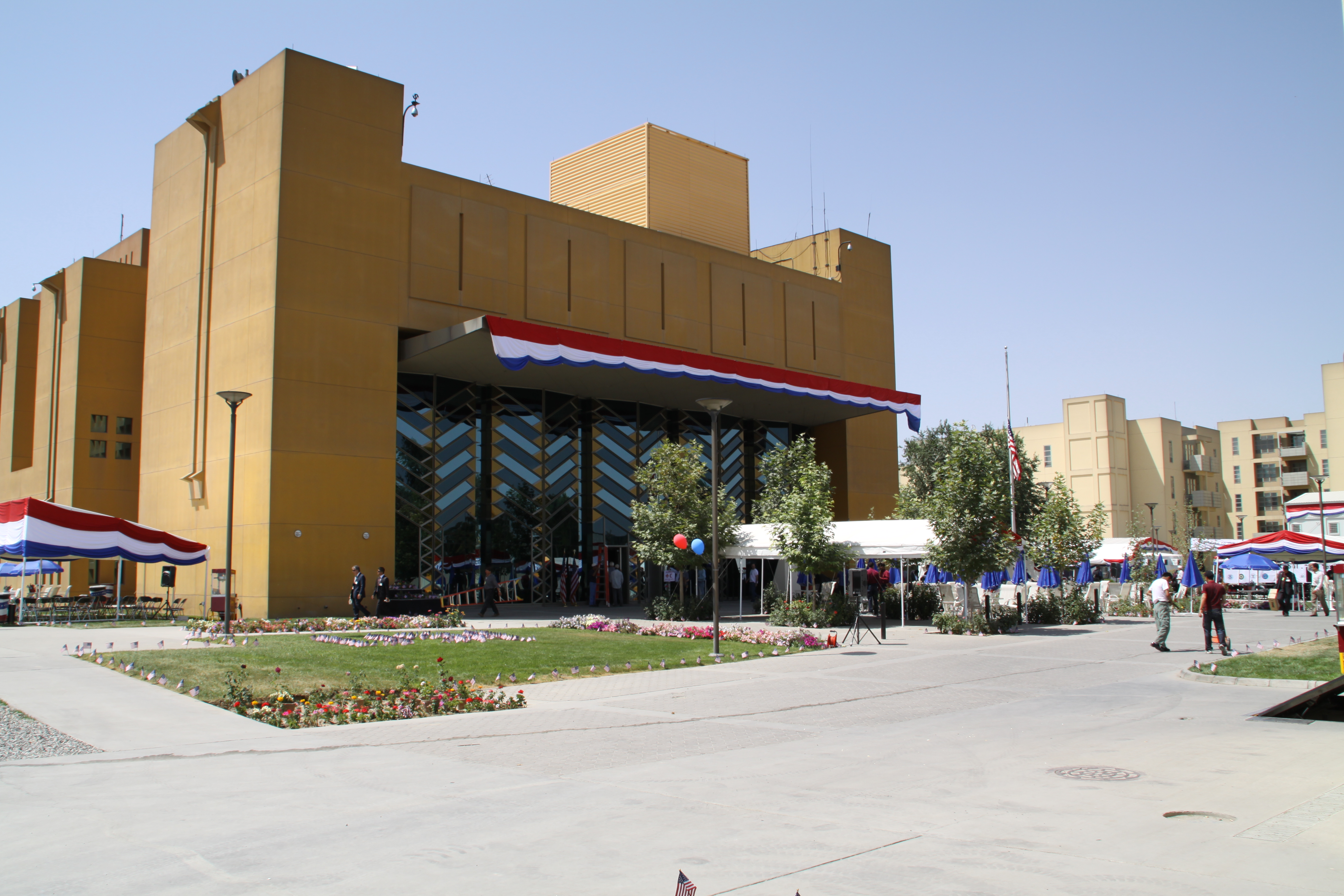
- US Embassy in Kabul
- Location: 33°N 65°E; Kabul, Nangarhar, Paktia and Logar provinces
- Date: 13:00 on 15 April 2012- 07:00 on 16 April 2012 AST (UTC+04:30)
- Target: Five Embassies, ISAF bases, Parliament, government buildings, airport, hotel.
- Deaths: At least 47 killed (39 insurgents, 8 security forces, 4 civilians)
- Injuries: At least 44 injured (39 security forces, 5 civilians)
- Perpetrators: Afghan Taliban; Haqqani Network (suspected)

The April 2012 Afghanistan attacks took place on Sunday, 15 April 2012, at around 13:00 local time (08:30 UTC) when heavily armed Taliban insurgents and suicide bombers launched multiple coordinated attacks throughout Afghanistan. Insurgents launched the 2012 spring offensive on multiple locations, including government buildings, military bases, and embassies. Attacks occurred in four Afghan provinces, including Kabul and Paktia. Different reports attribute responsibility for the attacks to either Taliban or the Haqqani network although the Taliban have claimed responsibility.

== Background ==
Between 1996 and 2001, the Taliban controlled large portions of Afghanistan following their emergence as a power bloc in 1992. The majority of Taliban political control centered on Kandahar, although the executive government remained based in the capital, Kabul. During the early parts of the war in Afghanistan, the International Security Assistance Force established a presence in Afghanistan, predominantly around Kabul.

Following a period of stabilization in Afghanistan, attacks started to increase with a growth in suicide bombings since 2006. In 2007, the number of Afghan civilian deaths stood at more than 230. In 2008, there were about 1,000 civilian deaths attributed to the Taliban. In 2011, the number of civilians killed rose 8% from 2010, with over 3,000 civilian deaths. The vast majority of the casualties were due to activities by insurgents. According to the Associated Press, there are around 25,000 Taliban soldiers in Afghanistan in 2012.

Insurgent activities follow an annual pattern with members of the various insurgent groups migrating out of Afghanistan in the winter months. The Spring Offensive is the yearly increase in offensive activity, related to the improving weather, which increases the insurgent groups' ability to maneuver around the country.

== Attacks ==
In the capital of Kabul, many foreign embassies are located in the so-called "Green Zone" of the capital. Since NATO took control of the ISAF in 2003, their headquarters is also in the Green Zone.

Major General Carsten Jacobson, the spokesperson for the International Security Assistance Force, said that militants attacked the United States, German, and British embassies in Kabul. The Iranian embassy was also attacked, as was the newly built Kabul Star hotel. The governor of Laghman Province, Lutfullah Mashal, said that men plotted to kill Karim Khalili, the second Vice President of Afghanistan. Within hours, Afghan security forces and Norwegian special forces captured or killed almost all of the militants.

The British SBS were crucial in fighting the terrorists. Norwegian special forces from the Hærens Jegerkommando was crucial in fighting back the attack.

Throughout the offensive on the embassies and government buildings in Kabul, members of the Afghan military, Afghan National Police, and National Directorate of Security repelled attacks from the Taliban, including suicide bombers. During early Monday morning, NATO helicopters searched for militants hiding in buildings near the ISAF headquarters and multiple embassies. The attack on Kabul lasted 18 hours. At the end of the siege on Kabul, almost 40 militants and eight Afghan soldiers were killed. In addition, four civilians were killed and 25 were injured across the country. The Taliban militants reportedly wore suicide vests and carried both rocket-propelled and hand grenades.

A lone suspected attacker captured by Afghan forces reportedly confessed Taliban assailants who waged the co-ordinated attacks across Afghanistan were part of a 200-member suicide squad trained in Pakistan.

According to Taliban spokesperson Zabiullah Mujahid, the attacks were "well-coordinated and planned for almost two months".

== Aftermath ==
General John R. Allen, the commander of the International Security Assistance Force, praised the Afghan military's ability to repel the Taliban attacks, saying "They [Afghan security forces] were on scene immediately, well-led and well-coordinated." President of Afghanistan Hamid Karzai applauded the actions by Afghan security forces. He told CNN that "the Afghan forces will be able to defend their country as they demonstrated yesterday". However, Karzai said that the attacks were a result of an "intelligence failure for us [Afghanistan] and especially NATO" and called for an investigation.

Bismillah Khan Mohammadi, the Interior Minister of Afghanistan, said the attackers belonged to the Haqqani Network, an insurgency group based in Afghanistan and Pakistan. A spokesperson for the Foreign Ministry of Iran, Ramin Mehmanparast, denounced the attacks, saying ""The Islamic Republic of Iran condemns the recent terrorist attacks in the capital and certain other provinces of Afghanistan, particularly the attacks on diplomatic centers based in Kabul, and believes that dialogue is the only solution to Afghanistan's security problems." The United States Secretary of State Hillary Clinton and Foreign Minister of Pakistan Hina Rabbani Khar condemned the attacks in Afghanistan in a joint statement. The Pakistani Foreign Minister also called the Foreign Minister of Afghanistan Zalmai Rassoul to express her condolences. Prime Minister of Australia Julia Gillard said that Australian forces in Afghanistan will be returning home in the upcoming months, with most troops coming home at the end of 2013. On Tuesday, 17 April, Karzai said the Taliban attacks "prolong foreign presence in Afghanistan".

== See also ==
- War in Afghanistan (2001–present)
- War on terror
- Iraq War
- Taliban insurgency
- List of terrorist attacks in Kabul
- Attacks on the United States
