= September 2018 Kabul attacks =

2018 murder in Afghanistan

September 2018 Kabul bombing
- Part of the War in Afghanistan (2001–present)
- Kabul (Afghanistan)
- Location: Kabul, Kabul Province, Afghanistan
- Date: 5 September 2018; 6 p.m. local time
- Target: Shia Hazaras
- Attack type: Suicide bombing (first attack), Car bombing (second attack)
- Deaths: 26
- Injuries: 91
- Perpetrator: ISIL

Two bombings on 5 September 2018 at the Maiwand Wrestling Club in Qala-e-Nazer in Dasht-e-Barchi, a predominantly Hazara neighborhood of western Kabul, left at least 20 people dead and 70 others wounded, the deadliest attack on Kabul's Shia since the 15 August suicide bombing. The responsibility for the attacks was claimed by ISIL.

== Attacks ==
In the first attack a suicide bomber detonated his explosive vest around 6 p.m. local time at the Maiwand Wrestling Club. The second explosion took place when a car packed with explosives was detonated by the time emergency services, journalists and police had gathered at the scene.

The witnesses said on social media that the attacker killed the club guards before blowing himself up inside the club.

== Casualties ==
The toll were initially reported to be 20 killed and 70 injured. Tolo News, a private broadcaster, said two of its "best journalists", Samim Faramarz, 28 and Ramiz Ahmadi, 23 were killed in the second attack and NAI said at least four other journalists were among the wounded people also in the second attack. Hashmat Stanekzai, the Kabul police spokesman, said the second explosion came when police were helping victims and as a result some of officers were wounded.

== See also ==
- List of terrorist incidents in September 2018
- September 2016 Kabul attacks
- List of terrorist attacks in Kabul
