= 7 August 2019 Kabul bombing =

Suicide car bomb attack in Kabul

- Part of War in Afghanistan (2001–2021)
- Bombing site (Afghanistan) Bombing site (Kabul)
- Location: 34°29′50″N 69°06′51″E; Kabul, Afghanistan
- Date: 7 August 2019; 09:00 (AFT; UTC+04:30)
- Target: A police station and a military training school in west Kabul
- Attack type: Suicide car bombing
- Deaths: 14
- Injuries: 145
- Perpetrator: Taliban

A suicide car bomb exploded at a security checkpoint outside a police station in the Afghanistan capital, Kabul, on 7 August 2019. The explosion occurred in the early morning, in a predominantly Shia neighbourhood in western Kabul. At least 14 people were killed and 145 injured, mostly civilians. The Taliban claimed responsibility for the attack, citing that one of their suicide bombers attacked "a recruitment centre". The attack occurred as ongoing negotiations between the Taliban and the United States were being conducted.

== Background ==
Following the September 11 attacks, the United States requested that the Taliban hand over Osama bin Laden, the leader of the terrorist group Al-Qaeda. After the Taliban refused, the US and other nations invaded Afghanistan. The Taliban still has control over 59 districts.

Over the years, the US has negotiated with the Taliban to end the war, with a likely solution that involves the withdrawal of US troops before the 2020 US presidential election being proposed in July and August 2019. Despite these ongoing peace negotiations, the Taliban has targeted civilians that would participate in the 2019 Afghan presidential election in various attacks carried out in the first half of 2019. The group has threatened to disrupt the elections on August 6, calling the elections "worthless" because they have no legitimacy.

This is not the first time in which a police station was targeted. In April 2019, a large attack was carried out by the Taliban in western Afghanistan in which 30 soldiers and police officers were killed. A similar event occurred on July 27, 2019, when a suicide bomb near a police headquarters in Ghazni Province killed three police officers and wounded 12. The United Nations Assistance Mission in Afghanistan has stated that the month of July 2019 was the deadliest in Afghanistan since May 2017 due to a rise in civilian casualties.

The military training school that was targeted also served as a recruitment center for security forces.

== Attack ==
The bomb was detonated around 9:00 am AFT on August 7, 2019, when a vehicle targeted the gates of District 6 police headquarters. The vehicle was stopped at a security checkpoint outside the building. The police headquarters was located in Golaee Dawa Khana, a Shi’ite neighborhood. The police headquarters and a military training school were the main targets. The explosion left thick smoke in the sky and formed a large crater. The police station, a nearby military training school, and all windows in a radius of a mile were destroyed.

The explosion left 14 people dead, including four police officers, and 145 wounded, mostly women and children; 92 of the wounded were civilians. Two of the attackers were killed, however one was arrested. The bomb used has been identified as a car bomb, with the Taliban claiming that a larger truck bomb was used instead. The attack occurred days before the Islamic holiday of Eid Al Adha.

== See also ==
- List of terrorist attacks in Kabul
