= 2013 Afghan presidential palace attack =

Attack at the presidential palace

Coordinates: 34.5333°N 69.1667°E

- Part of War in Afghanistan
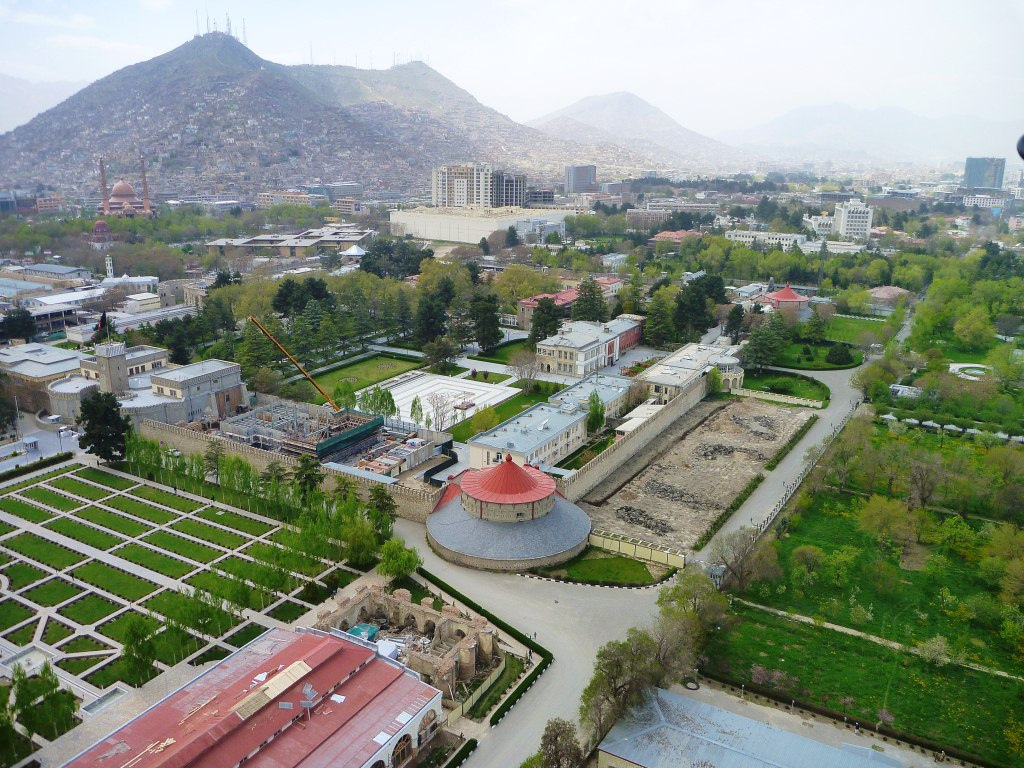
- Presidential Palace in Afghanistan
- Location: Kabul, Afghanistan
- Date: 25 June 2013
- Attack type: Mass shooting
- Deaths: 11: 3 palace guards; 8 Taliban fighters
- Perpetrator: Taliban

The 2013 Afghan presidential palace attack occurred on 25 June 2013, in a highly secure zone of Kabul, the capital city of Afghanistan.

The attack, claimed to be carried out by the Taliban, occurred at the eastern gate of the presidential palace around 04:30 - 06:30 a.m. AFT, where a group of reporters were gathering for security checks ahead of a presidential news conference. Between seven and eight explosions, alleged to be Taliban suicide bombers, occurred outside the palace. The explosions were later followed by an intense exchange of gunfire between three or four Taliban fighters, and Afghan security officials, which lasted 90 minutes. Obtaining fake identification, badges and vehicle passes, five of the eight Taliban members were able to clear high-level security clearances, driving two Land Cruisers similar to those used by international soldiers to penetrate the heavily fortified security zone in Kabul. All insurgents were killed in the ensuing battle with security forces.

The United States Central Intelligence Agency's Afghanistan station located nearby the presidential palace was also struck by two rocket-propelled grenades during the attack. Targeting the CIA's office in the Ariana Hotel, the Taliban attacked inside one of the most heavily restricted areas of Afghanistan, in downtown Kabul where the U.S. Embassy and the headquarters of the NATO-led International Security Assistance Force are located. The headquarters of the Afghan Ministry of Defense was also targeted in the Taliban attack.

With no immediate reports of civilian casualties, it remains unclear whether several Afghan schoolchildren who were caught in the crossfire between the Taliban and security forces were harmed. Afghan President Hamid Karzai, who was inside the palace at the time, was not injured. The attack resulted in the deaths of three palace security guards, and all eight of the Taliban fighters.

== See also ==
- List of terrorist attacks in Kabul
