= September 2016 Kabul attacks =

Car bombings in Kabul, Afghanistan

September 2016 Kabul bombing
- Part of the War in Afghanistan (2001–2021)
- Kabul (Afghanistan)
- Location: Kabul, Kabul Province, Islamic Republic of Afghanistan
- Date: 5 September 2016 - 6 September 2016
- Attack type: Car bombings
- Weapon: car bomb
- Deaths: 42+ to 58
- Injuries: 109
- Perpetrator: Taliban
- Motive: unknown

Explosions in Kabul on September 5, 2016 killed over 41 people and injured 103 others in twin suicide bombings near the Afghan defense ministry. The Taliban claimed the first attack and said that their suicide bomber killed 58 people. Reportedly an army general and one district police chief were killed in the blast. Attacks lasted overnight with a siege and hostage situation. At least one person was killed and six injured in another attack on a charity CARE International building in Shāre Naw. The attack was claimed by the Taliban, with at least 3 of their attackers being killed and 42 hostages being rescued.

The attacks come after another Taliban bombing only a few days before that killed two people and at least 6 militants.

== See also ==
- List of terrorist incidents in August 2016
- July 2016 Kabul bombing
- American University of Afghanistan attack
- September 2018 Kabul attacks
- List of terrorist attacks in Kabul
