= 7 August 2015 Kabul attacks =

Terrorist attack in Afghanistan

August 2015 Kabul Attacks
- Part of the Taliban insurgency
- Kabul location
- Location: Kabul, Afghanistan
- Date: August 7, 2015; 1:17 am local time
- Attack type: Suicide bombings, Firefights
- Deaths: 50+ (including at least one perpetrator)
- Injuries: 500+
- Perpetrator: Taliban

A series of bombings in central Kabul on 7 August 2015 caused approximately 50 deaths and several hundred injuries. The attacks were ascribed to the Taliban and were the first major attacks mounted by that group since the death of their chief Mullah Omar.

The first explosion was a truck bomb, occurring at 1:17 am local time near an Afghan army base in the impoverished district of Shah Shaheed (District 8), killing at least 15 and injuring more than 240, mostly civilians.

Later, a suicide attacker in army dress joined a queue of police trainees waiting to be searched at the entrance to the Kabul police academy and blew himself up, resulting in the death of at least 20 cadets and injury to at least 20 more. The incident occurred when cadets were returning to the academy after their two-day weekend, marking a serious breach of security at a premier training institute for Afghan security forces. The Taliban claimed responsibility for this attack.

In a third incident, a US special forces base at Camp Integrity, near the airport, came under attack from explosions and gunfire. One member of the NATO forces was killed.

== See also ==
- War in Afghanistan (2001–present)
- List of terrorist incidents, 2015
- List of terrorist attacks in Kabul
