= February 2009 raids on Kabul =

Air strikes and fatalities in Kabul

- Afghan security forces hunt the 5th suicide bomber atop the Ministry of Justice building.
- Objective: Attack Afghanistan government agencies
- Date: February 11, 2009
- Executed by: Taliban
- Outcome: Justice Ministry, Directorate of Prisons, Education Ministry attacked
- Casualties: 21 killed, 57 wounded

The February 2009 raids on Kabul were a series of strikes by the Taliban against Afghan government targets in Kabul, Afghanistan on February 11, 2009. The attacks killed 21 and injured 57. The attacks happened the day before the new American envoy to Afghanistan and Pakistan, Richard Holbrooke, was due to arrive in the country.

Eight Taliban fighters were involved in the assault, and all were killed. Five Taliban stormed the Justice Ministry building, killing two guards then laying siege to the building for about an hour. About ten people died in the fighting there. At the Directorate of Prisons, one attacker blew himself up at a checkpoint and the other ran inside the building and blew himself up, killing seven and injuring 15. One attacker was killed before he could attack the Education Ministry building.

The Taliban claimed the attacks, saying they were revenge for the killing of prisoners at the Pul-i-Charkhi Prison. Afghan officials said the mastermind of the attack was based in Pakistan, based on intercepted text messages. An American official blamed fighters loyal to Jalaluddin Haqqani.

On March 18, officials from Afghanistan's National Directorate for Security announced that they had arrested seven men and killed an eighth in Kabul and Logar province who had been involved in planning and conducting the raid. Sayed Ansari, a spokesman for the directorate, stated that the assailants were believed to have trained in Pakistan and communicated with Pakistani-based handlers before and during the assaults.

Ansari stated that an Afghan man, named Mohammad Haris, had helped organize the raid in Waziristan, Pakistan, perhaps with assistance from Pakistan's Inter-Services Intelligence Directorate. Ansari added that the attackers were equipped with a megaphone, enough food for several days, and cellphones to keep in touch with each other and with their mastermind in Pakistan.
