= 2011 attack on the United States embassy, Kabul =

Incident in which Taliban fighters attacked multiple locations in Kabul

September 2011 Kabul attack
- Part of the Taliban insurgency
- Kabul (Afghanistan)
- Location: Kabul, Afghanistan
- Date: 13 September 2011
- Weapons: AK-47s, suicide vests, rocket-propelled grenade launchers
- Deaths: 7
- Injuries: 15
- Perpetrator: Taliban

The September 2011 Kabul attack occurred when Taliban fighters attacked multiple locations in Kabul, Afghanistan including the US Embassy and NATO headquarters, on 13 September 2011. The insurgents and at least seven others were killed and 15 were wounded. It was the first incident in the capital in which widely separated targets came under simultaneous attack. Elements within the Afghan and Pakistan governments were suspected of complicity in the attacks.

== The attacks ==
On 13 September 2011, just after noon, four to six insurgents left a car at a checkpoint at Abdul Haq square and entered a nine-floor partly constructed building near Kabul's diplomatic district. They were armed with rocket-propelled grenade launchers, AK-47s and suicide vests. They fired rockets at the U.S. Embassy and NATO headquarters. Three other insurgents died when they attempted to carry out suicide attacks on Afghan police buildings in another part of the city. A gun battle around Abdul Haq Square continued into the early evening. Afghan security forces regained control of the nine-story building, with assistance from helicopters of the Afghan and US armies. All the militants were killed by the next day. Three police officers, four civilians and up to six insurgents were killed and 15 people wounded in the four attacks. It was stated to be the first incident in the capital in which widely separated targets came under simultaneous attack.

No US embassy personnel were hurt in the incident, thanks to the heroic efforts of the RSO's and the Delta shift embassy security forces, although four Afghan visa applicants who were waiting at the embassy were wounded.

Another deadly attack occurred later the same month.

== Responsibility for the attacks ==
The attacks were seen as a move by the Taliban to strengthen their negotiating position in expected talks with US representatives. Suspicions were voiced that the attackers must have received assistance from within the Afghan security structure, pointing out that they had evaded multiple checkpoints.

The United States blamed Pakistan's government, mainly Pakistani Army and its Inter-Services Intelligence (ISI) spy network as the masterminds behind the attack. U.S. Ambassador to Pakistan, Cameron Munter, told Radio Pakistan that "The attack that took place in Kabul a few days ago, that was the work of the Haqqani network. There is evidence linking the Haqqani Network to the Pakistan government. This is something that must stop." Other top U.S. officials such as Hillary Clinton and Leon Panetta made similar statements.

In choosing to use violent extremism as an instrument of policy, the government of Pakistan, and most especially the Pakistani army and ISI, jeopardizes not only the prospect of our strategic partnership but Pakistan's opportunity to be a respected nation with legitimate regional influence. They may believe that by using these proxies, they are hedging their bets or redressing what they feel is an imbalance in regional power. But in reality, they have already lost that bet. — Admiral Mike Mullen

== See also ==
- List of terrorist attacks in Kabul
- Attacks on the United States
