= 22 August 2015 Kabul suicide bombing =

Suicide bombing attack in Kabul

- Part of the Taliban insurgency
- Kabul location
- Location: 3rd Makroyan, Kabul, Afghanistan
- Date: 22 August 2015
- Target: NATO troops
- Attack type: Suicide bombing
- Deaths: 10
- Injuries: 60
- Perpetrator: Taliban

At least 10 people died and more than 60 were wounded in a suicide bomb attack in Kabul, Afghanistan, on 22 August 2015.

== Casualties ==
At least 10 people were killed, and 60 people wounded, including a woman and 3 NATO troops.

== See also ==
- List of terrorist incidents, 2015
- List of terrorist attacks in Kabul
