= 2019 Kabul mosque bombing =

2019 bombing at a mosque in Kabul, Afghanistan

- Part of War in Afghanistan
- Kabul (Afghanistan)
- Date: 24 May 2019
- Time: 1:20 pm
- Location: Kabul, Afghanistan
- Type: Bombing
- Deaths: 3
- Injuries: 20

The 2019 Kabul mosque bombing occurred around 01:20pm (08:50 GMT) on 24 May 2019, while worshippers and the imam were inside the Al-Taqwa mosque for Friday prayer. The explosives were placed in the mosque's microphone which was used by the imam. At least three people were killed, including the imam, Samiullah Rayhan, and nearly 20 people were injured. So far, no group or individual has claimed to be responsible for the attack.

== Incident ==
A bombing attack happened in Al-Taqwa mosque in Kabul, around 01:20pm (08:50 GMT), and killed or injured dozens of worshippers who came for Friday prayer. Two people, including a scholar, Samiullah Rayhan, were killed and at least 16 wounded after a bomb explosion. Although the Taliban regularly stages attacks in the area, Nasrat Rahimi, a spokesman for the Afghan Ministry of Interior Affairs said, the Taliban is responsible for the attack. A spokesman for the Taliban’s group denied Rahimi's claim. After Taliban’s new leader appointment, Mawlawi Haibatullah Akhundzada, the number of attack to religious person increased. A district police official, Jan Agha, said the bomb was fixed in the mosque microphone which was used by the mosque imam, Mawlawi Samiullah Raihan.

Samiullah Rayhan, 36, a father of four children, was an imam at Al-Taqwa mosque. He was a parliamentary adviser and the host of a daily religious television show. His support for the families of fallen Afghan soldiers, condemnation of the Taliban’s suicide bombings, women’s rights, and cooperation between Western military forces and the Afghan government were the main reasons for being targeted in the attack. Firdaws Faramarz, a police spokesman said, the bomb explosion happened near the altar of the Al-Taqwa mosque, a place used by the mosque leader to initiate the prayers.

According to the New York Times, Afghanistan's situation is difficult for religious scholars because supporting either the government or the Taliban lead to being targeted by the other.

== Reactions ==
President Ashraf Ghani condemned the mosque attack as a terrorist act.

== See also ==
- List of terrorist attacks in Kabul
- List of terrorist incidents in 2019
