= 2 and 5 September 2019 Kabul bombings =

Bombing aiming foreign citizens living in Kabul, Afghanistan

- Part of War in Afghanistan (2001–present)
- Location: Kabul, Afghanistan
- Date: 2 September 2019 (first attack); 5 September 2019 (second attack)
- Target: Foreign residents (first attack); Civilians and security forces (second attack)
- Deaths: 16 (2 September); 12 (5 September); Total: 28
- Injuries: 119 (2 September); 40+ (5 September); Total: 159+
- Perpetrator: Taliban

On the evening of 2 September 2019, a bomb on a tractor killed 16 people and injured 119 others at a housing compound used by international organisations in Kabul, Afghanistan. The target of the attack was foreign citizens living in the town; five Nepalis, two Britons and a 43-year-old Romanian diplomat were killed in the attack. Twenty-five other foreign residents were wounded, including another Romanian.

On 5 September 2019, at least 12 people, including an American service member and a Romanian soldier, were killed and more than 40 injured when a suicide car bomber exploded in a heavily fortified area of central Kabul, close to the Afghan security offices. The Taliban claimed responsibility for the attacks.

== See also ==
- List of terrorist attacks in Kabul
