= 2009 NATO Afghanistan headquarters bombing =

Bomb attacks

- Part of the Taliban insurgency
- Location: Kabul, Afghanistan
- Date: August 15, 2009; 8:30 AM (UTC+4:30)
- Target: North Atlantic Treaty Organization headquarters
- Attack type: Suicide attack
- Deaths: 7
- Injuries: 91
- Perpetrator: Taliban

The 2009 NATO Afghanistan headquarters bombing occurred on August 15, 2009, when a Taliban suicide bomber detonated himself outside the NATO headquarters in Kabul, Afghanistan. The bomber killed at least seven people and injured 91.

== Attack ==
The bomber drove his automobile undetected through three or fewer police-checkpoints before detonating his explosive payload, estimated as variously 275 kilograms (606 lb) and 500 kilograms (1,100 lb), 30 yards (27 m) from the main gate of the NATO base. The attack, coming five days before the country's presidential elections, was the first major attack in the capital since February.

== Aftermath ==
The attack wounded 91 people and immediately killed seven civilians, though doctors stated that some patients were in danger of succumbing to injuries later on. Casualties among the military were stated to have been avoided by ISAF Brigadier General Eric Tremblay, though he would not give details. The Taliban claimed differently, stating that they had destroyed four vehicles and killed 24 US embassy employees. Among those wounded was parliament member, Awa Alam Nuristani, and a female campaign manager for President Hamid Karzai. After the attacks Karzai declared that "the enemies of Afghanistan, by conducting such attacks, are trying to create fear among the people as we get close to the election, but people still realise the importance of going to ballot boxes to cast their votes."

The attack was claimed by a Taliban spokesperson to have been carried out as a method to disrupt the country's second election. The spokesman, Zabihullah Mujahid, stated that, "One of our suicide bombers in a (Toyota Hilux) Surf vehicle packed with 500 kilograms of explosives targeted the ISAF headquarters... We will continue this kind of operation in the future and we will accelerate our operations against the Afghan and foreign forces."

The blast occurred in one of the city's most heavily guarded streets, which runs between the United States Embassy and the presidential palace. The blast did not affect them, nor did it cause substantial damage to the NATO headquarters. It was the first attack on the NATO compound since its construction in 2002.

The incident marked the beginning of a wave of intimidation by unknown perpetrators, mostly spread by telephone calls and text messaging, warning Afghans not to participate in polling at risk of being killed and targeted alongside foreign forces.

== See also ==
- List of terrorist incidents, 2009
- List of massacres in Afghanistan
