= 2009 UN guest house attack in Kabul =

Attack at the UN guest house

- Kabul (Afghanistan)
- Objective: Attack United Nations and Afghan government employees
- Date: October 28, 2009
- Executed by: Taliban
- Outcome: United Nations/Afghan government guest house attacked
- Casualties: 11 killed (including the 3 attackers)

The 2009 UN guest house attack happened in the early hours of October 28, 2009, in Kabul, Afghanistan. 3 Taliban attackers stormed a guest house used by the United Nations, killing five UN staff, two Afghan security personnel and an Afghan civilian.

== Background ==
The Bakhtar guest house is a privately owned, 42-room guest house in Kabul, Afghanistan that catered to foreign aid workers. According to a statement made by United Nations Secretary-General Ban Ki-moon, 25 UN staff members were there, including 17 men and women of the United Nations Development Programme election team (UNDP/ELECT). The attack was part of the Taliban's plans to disrupt the Presidential election runoff.

== Attack ==
According to survivors, three attackers, dressed as policemen, arrived at the compound around 3:30 a.m. and shot and killed two Afghan security guards at the compound's front entrance. Two of the attackers then climbed a wall and began firing rifle grenades at the guest house while the third fired a machine-gun to repel counterattacks by other security guards and police.

Two UN security guards responded and fired pistols at the attackers, while 25 of the guests escaped out the back of the house. One UN security guard, an American from Miami named Louis Maxwell, climbed to the roof of the building to fire at the attackers. Maxwell and the other security guard, Laurance Mefful from Ghana, were able to prevent the attackers from entering the building for almost one hour. Maxwell and Mefful were then reportedly killed by the attackers, although later reports suggest Maxwell was wounded but survived the confrontation, only to be executed by Afghan policemen responding to the attack. The attackers then apparently approached the building. Two of the attackers were killed by gunfire from unknown sources and the third detonated a suicide vest, killing himself and at least two guests who had not evacuated the building.

Nearly simultaneous with the guest house attack, rockets were fired at the Afghan Presidential Palace and the Serena Hotel, though there were no injuries in either incident.

The attackers wore explosive suicide vests. Even after the Afghan security forces arrived, they moved slowly into the compound which allowed the event to go on for over 6 hours.

After the attack, the UN questioned why it took Afghan police and NATO forces more than an hour to respond and come to the UN's aid. Afghan authorities denied that the police response was slow and NATO stated that no one called it to ask for help.

'The Sentimental Terrorist' a novel of Afghanistan is partially based on this incident, with jihadists preparing to attack a Kabul guest house.

== Casualties ==
Five UN staff, two Afghan security personnel and an Afghan civilian were killed in the attack. Nine additional UN staffers were also injured. The dead UN staff members were from Ethiopia, Ghana, Liberia, the Philippines and the United States. The civilian was the brother-in-law of Provincial governor Gul Agha Sherzai, who had been watching the attack and was killed by a stray bullet.

Two of the three other UN staffers killed in the attack, Lydia Wonwene of Liberia and Jossie Esto of the Philippines, were election workers. The third staffer killed worked for UNICEF.

== Responsibility ==
Zabiullah Mujahid, a regular Taliban spokesman, confirmed that the Taliban was responsible for the attacks and that it was part of a plan to disrupt the Presidential election runoff. Zabiullah asserted that the Taliban had warned those working on the election that if they continued they were to be the targets of an attack.

An Afghan government intelligence official, Amrullah Saleh, stated that the attacks were planned and carried out by the Haqqani network with help from Al Qaeda in Pakistan.

The report of the United Nations Board of Inquiry confirmed the political connotation of the attack and details the findings on whether UN staff members were killed by friendly fire.

== See also ==
- List of massacres in Afghanistan
