= 2002 Kabul bombing =

Car bombing in Kabul, Afghanistan

Coordinates: 34.533°N 69.166°E

- Kabul (Afghanistan)
- Location: Kabul, Afghanistan
- Date: September 5, 2002
- Target: Unknown
- Attack type: Car bombing
- Deaths: 26
- Injuries: 167
- Perpetrator: Unknown

The 2002 Kabul bombing was a car bombing that killed 26 people and wounded 167 on September 5, 2002, in front of the Ministry of Information and Culture building in Kabul, Afghanistan. It was the biggest and deadliest attack since the formation of the Karzai administration. The Taliban, al-Qaeda, and Gulbuddin Hekmatyar's group have all been suspects. It came shortly after Hekmaytar called for a Jihad against the foreign troops of ISAF. A few hours after the bombings, Hamid Karzai narrowly survived an assassination attempt by a Taliban member in the city of Kandahar.

== See also ==
- List of massacres in Afghanistan
