= May 2010 Kabul bombing =

Attack on NATO convoy

- Part of the Taliban insurgency
- Kabul (Afghanistan)
- Location: Kabul, Afghanistan
- Date: May 18, 2010
- Target: NATO convoy
- Attack type: Suicide car bombing
- Deaths: 18
- Injuries: 52
- Perpetrator: Taliban

The May 2010 Kabul bombing occurred on May 18, 2010, in Kabul, Afghanistan. Eighteen people, including five US soldiers and a Canadian soldier, were killed and 52 were injured when a NATO convoy was targeted by a Taliban suicide attacker. It was the deadliest attack against NATO forces in Afghanistan since September 2009, when six Italian soldiers were killed by a suicide bomber. Two full colonels and two lieutenant colonels were killed in the attack, making it the deadliest attack against ranking officers in Afghanistan. With the attack, the total number of Americans killed in Afghanistan crossed one thousand.

== Background ==
President Hamid Karzai had recently returned from a trip to US to gather support for his policy to promote peace and reconciliation in Afghanistan. A jirga was planned to discuss methods to promote peace with the tribal elders. A military offensive was also being planned in the Kandahar Province. Shortly before this attack, the Taliban had announced 'Operation al-Fatah', which would target NATO forces, foreign diplomats, contractors and Afghan government. Afghan police had set up several extra security checkpoints this year. In spite of these measures, the bomber was able to drive his vehicle into the city.

== Attack ==
Deaths by nationality
Country	Number
Afghanistan	12
United States	5
Canada	1
Total	18

The bomber, driving a Toyota minivan packed with more than 1600 pounds of explosives, drove into a convoy of American military vehicles moving down the Dar-ul-Aman road at about 8 a.m. local time and exploded. The blast created a deep crater in the road near the ruined Darul Aman Palace. The bombing happened during rush hour near the National Assembly of Afghanistan. The blast destroyed 5 US military vehicles and 13 civilian vehicles. Most of the dead were Afghan civilians including women and children in a public bus which was driving past when the explosion happened. Five US soldiers were among the dead. The dead Canadian soldier was identified as Colonel Geoff Parker, originally from Oakville, Ontario. He is the highest-ranked Canadian soldier killed in Afghanistan. An American colonel, two American lieutenant colonels, one Staff Sergeant and one Sergeant. The American officers were identified as colonel John M. McHugh, 46, from New Jersey, and lieutenant colonels, Paul R. Bartz, 43, of Waterloo, Wisconsin, and Thomas P. Belkofer, 44, of Perrysburg, Ohio. Staff Sergeant Richard J. Tieman, of Waynesboro, Pennsylvania, and Sergeant Joshua Tomlinson of Dubberly, Louisiana, were also killed.

== Responsibility ==
The Taliban took responsibility for the attack. They stated that they had sent a man named Nizamuddin to carry out the attack. Several analysts believe that the attack reflected Taliban opposition to the upcoming peace jirga proposed by President Hamid Karzai. According to Afghanistan's spy agency, the attack was allegedly carried out by Pakistan's spy agency Inter-Services Intelligence. Saeed Ansari, a spokesman for National Directorate of Security, Afghanistan's spy agency stated that 'All the explosions and terrorist attacks by these people were plotted from the other side of the border and most of the explosives and materials used for the attacks were brought from the other side to Afghanistan.' According to US military intelligence officials, the Haqqani network, based in Pakistan, was also involved in the attack.

== Reactions ==
The attack drew strong condemnation from Anders Fogh Rasmussen, the Secretary General of NATO. Prime Minister Stephen Harper of Canada condemned the attack and mourned Parker, calling him a "great Canadian who will be greatly missed by the Canadian Forces family and his community."

== See also ==
- List of terrorist incidents, 2010
- Coalition casualties in Afghanistan
