= January 2010 Kabul attack =

Suicide bombing and killings in central Kabul

- Part of the Taliban insurgency
- Kabul (Afghanistan)
- Location: Kabul, Afghanistan
- Date: 18 January 2010
- Target: Presidential Palace, government buildings, commercial buildings
- Attack type: Suicide bombing, shooting
- Deaths: 12 (3 soldiers, 2 civilians, 7 attackers)
- Injuries: 71
- Perpetrator: Taliban

The January 2010 Kabul attack was a suicide bombing and gun attack which occurred in central Kabul, Afghanistan for several hours on 18 January 2010. Taliban gunmen attacked the Presidential Palace and several government buildings. Two shopping centres, two cinemas and a bank were also targeted by the attackers. Twelve people were killed in the attack: two civilians, three members of security forces and seven Taliban fighters (at least two of whom were suicide bombers); 71 other people were wounded. According to a statement on a Taliban website, the nearby Kabul Serena Hotel and government buildings were the intended target for the attack and that 20 of their members committed the attack.

== See also ==
- List of massacres in Afghanistan
