= 28 December 2017 Kabul suicide bombing =

ISIL terrorist incident in Afghanistan

Coordinates: 34°51′N 69°11′E

December 2017 Kabul suicide bombing
- Part of War in Afghanistan
- Kabul (Afghanistan)
- Location: Tebyan Cultural Centre, Kabul, Afghanistan
- Date: 28 December 2017
- Target: Shia Muslims
- Attack type: Suicide bombing
- Weapon: Bomb
- Deaths: 50 (including the perpetrator)
- Injuries: 80
- Perpetrator: Islamic State – Khorasan Province
- Motive: Sunni fundamentalism Anti-Shi'ism

The December 2017 Kabul suicide bombing occurred on 28 December 2017, when militants attacked a Shiite cultural centre in Kabul, Afghanistan. The attack killed 50 people and injured over 80.

The major explosion of the attack occurred in the Tebyan Cultural centre (also spelled "Tabayan Cultural Centre" and "Tabian Cultural Centre"), a Shia cultural organisation, located in the Shia-dominated Dashte Barchi area of Kabul. The cultural centre also housed the Afghan Voice Agency, with victims including journalists and university students. The bombing occurred during a discussion held to mark the 38th anniversary of the Soviet invasion of Afghanistan. The interior ministry of Afghanistan stated that two other explosions occurred soon afterwards, but did not cause any fatalities. Among those killed were two children. Most of those injured were suffering from burns. Photographs taken by eyewitnesses showed significant damage to the targeted building.

The so-called Islamic State of Iraq and Levant (ISIL) claimed responsibility for the attack in an online statement released by the Amaq News Agency, operated by ISIL. The attack is among a series that has targeted Afghanistan's Shia minority, who are seen as heretics by the Islamic State. According to the United Nations, 12 attacks have targeted Shiites in Afghanistan since the beginning of 2016, in which more than 700 people have been killed. The Taliban denied responsibility for the attack soon after it occurred. Afghan President Ashraf Ghani described the incident as an "unpardonable" crime against humanity.

== See also ==
- List of terrorist incidents linked to Islamic State – Khorasan Province
- List of terrorist attacks in Kabul
