= Security checkpoint =

Military or paramilitary checkpoint

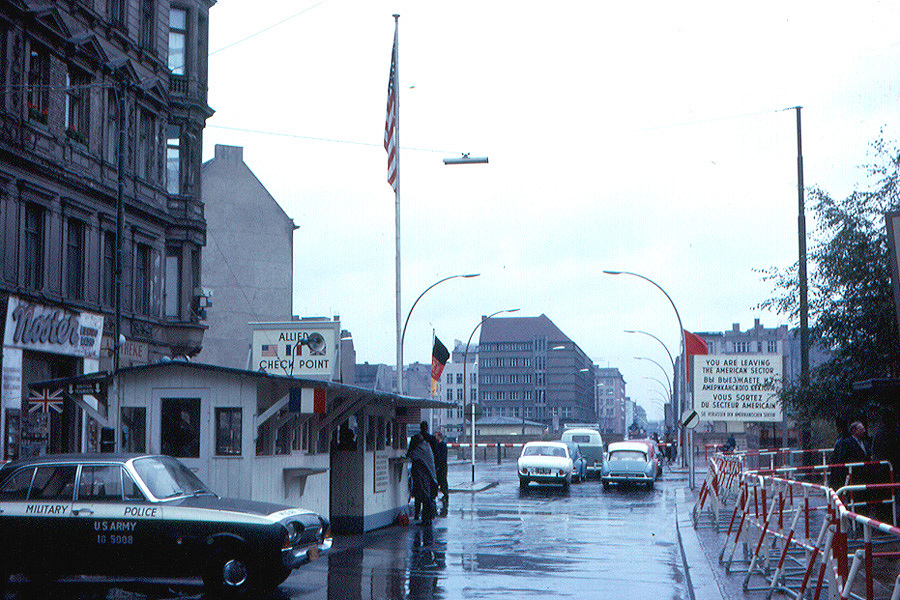
Checkpoint Charlie in 1963

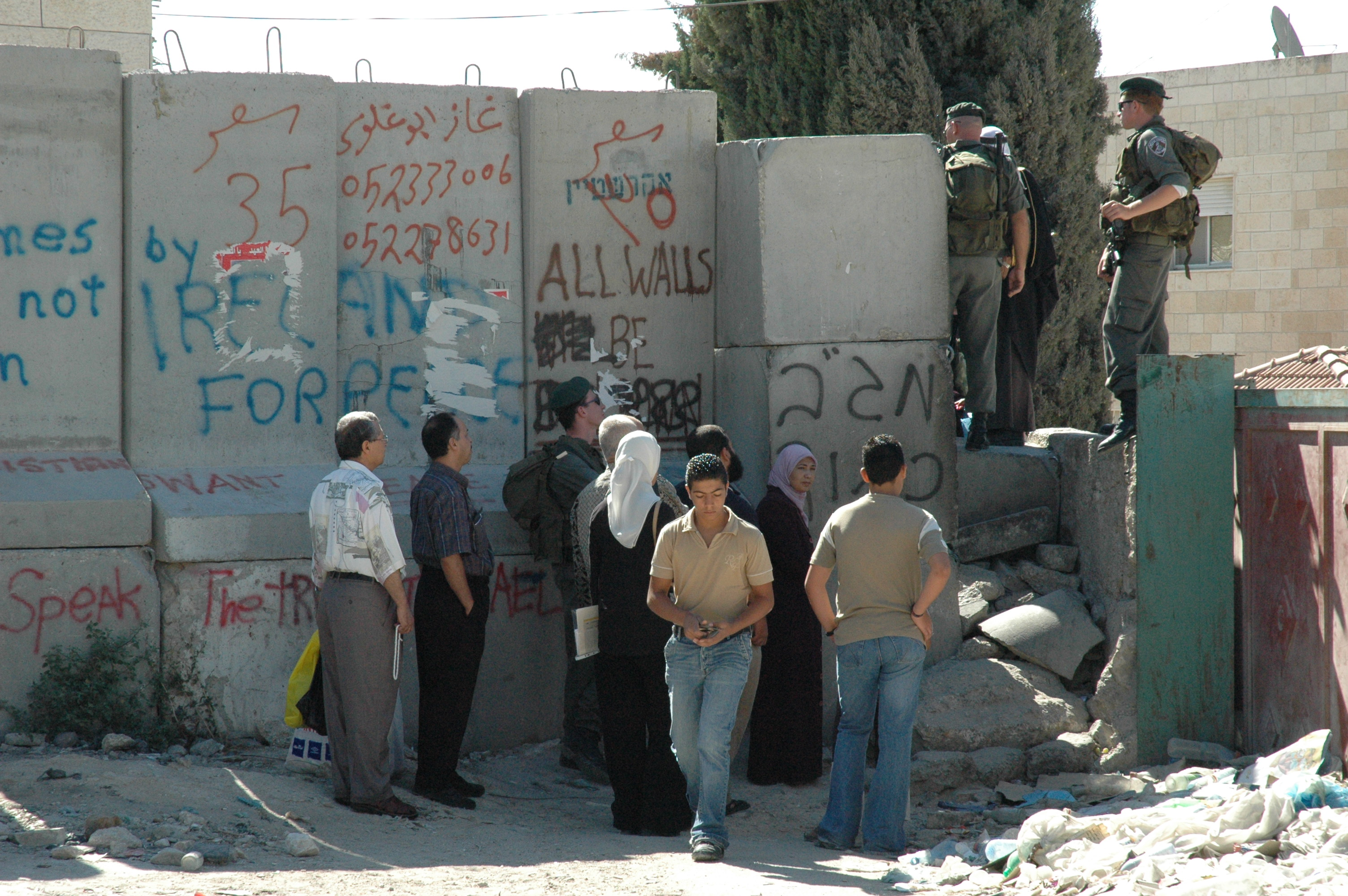
Israeli checkpoint near Abu Dis in the West Bank

Civilian checkpoints or security checkpoints are distinguishable from border or frontier checkpoints in that they are erected and enforced within contiguous areas under military or paramilitary control. Civilian checkpoints have been employed within conflict-ridden areas all over the world to monitor and control the movement of people and materials in order to prevent violence. They have also been used by police during peacetime to help counter terrorism.

== Contemporary examples ==
Though practices and enforcement vary, checkpoints have been used in:

- Airports and other transportation hubs across the world, including those managed by the TSA in the United States.
- Post World War II checkpoints in Germany
- The former Yugoslavia during the Yugoslav Wars.
- Northern Ireland by the Official IRA, Provisional IRA, Irish National Liberation Army, and Real IRA as well as by the British Army, Royal Ulster Constabulary, Police Service of Northern Ireland and also by the Ulster Defense Association and the Ulster Volunteer Force.
- Colombia, by military and paramilitary forces.
- Palestinian territories, by the Israeli Defence Force.
- Mexico, by military and police forces.
- Since the terrorist bombings in Pakistan, they are widely seen across all over Pakistan specially on entrance and exit points of big cities.
- French Guiana, by the National Gendarmerie.
- Riau Islands, by military and paramilitary forces.

== Advantages ==
Checkpoints provide many advantages, including the ability to control how people enter so that security personnel (be it governmental or civilian) can screen entrants to identify known troublemakers (be they criminals, terrorists, or simple rabble-rousers) and locate contraband items.

== Effects of checkpoints ==
Checkpoints typically lead to hardship for the affected civilians, though these effects range from inconvenience to mortal danger. Birzeit University, for example, has conducted several studies highlighting the effects of checkpoints in the Palestinian territories.

In Colombia, the paramilitary forces of the AUC have, according to Amnesty International, imposed limits on the food entering villages, with over 30 people being killed at the checkpoint in one instance.

In Ethiopia's Amhara region, checkpoints have functioned as shifting sites of control during the civil conflict since 2020. Their operation has often been unpredictable, involving both state and non-state actors, and affecting not only mobility but also the daily experience of authority and fear.

== See also ==
- Airport security
- Border checkpoint
- Freedom of movement
- Outpost
- Random checkpoint
