= 2019 in Afghanistan =

- Decades: 1990s; 2000s; 2010s; 2020s
- See also: Other events of 2019; List of years in Afghanistan

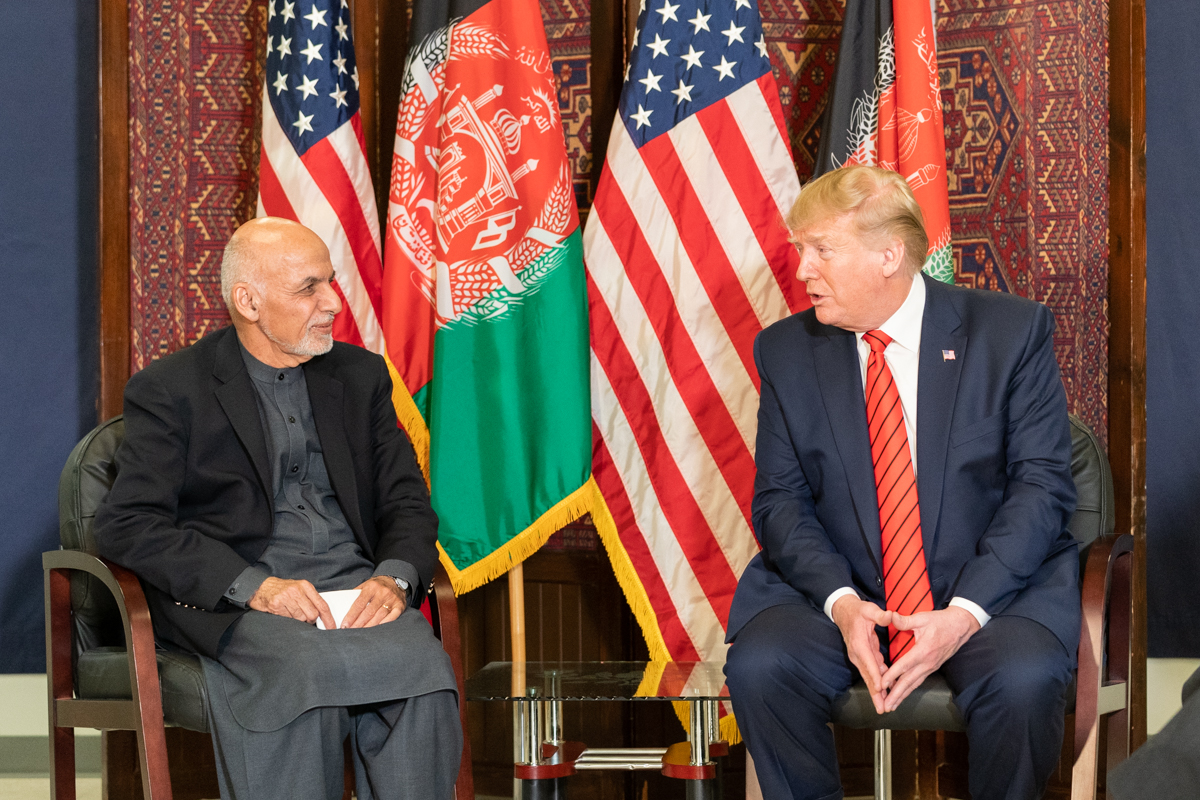
President Donald J. Trump speaks with Afghanistan President Ashraf Ghani during their meeting on November 28, 2019, at Bagram Airfield, Afghanistan

Events from the year 2019 in Afghanistan.

== Incumbents ==
- President: Ashraf Ghani
- Chief Executive: Abdullah Abdullah
- Speaker of Wolesi Jirga: Abdul Rauf Ibrahimi
- Speaker of Meshrano Jirga: Fazel Hadi Muslimyar
- First Vice President of Afghanistan: Abdul Rashid Dostum
- Second Vice President of Afghanistan: Sarwar Danish
- First Deputy Chief Executive of Afghanistan: Khyal Mohammad Mohammad Khan
- Second Deputy Chief Executive of Afghanistan: Vacant

=== January ===
The United Nations Assistance Mission in Afghanistan (UNAMA) reported a record high 10,993 civilian casualties (3,804 deaths and 7,189 injured) in 2018, which it said represented a 5% increase in overall civilian casualties and an 11% increase in civilian deaths compared to 2017. UNAMA identified causes including a spike in suicide attacks by anti-government elements and aerial and search operations by pro-government forces (more than 500 civilians killed by aerial operations for the first time on record).

Afghanistan was considered one of the most corrupt countries on Earth in 2018, ranking 172 out of 180 countries in the Corruption Perceptions Index released by Transparency International. Also, according to the World Happiness Report, the country was the third least happy in the world, exceeded only by the Central African Republic and South Sudan.

- January 1 – Afghan special forces attacked ISIS-K in eastern Nangarhar Province's Achin District, killing 27 militants according to officials. Two local ISIS leaders were reported among those killed.
- January 3 – U.S. Army Chief of Staff General Mark Milley unexpectedly visited Kabul, meeting with president Ashraf Ghani to discuss ways to end the conflict.
- January 4 – Taliban fighters continued to threaten major oil wells in northern Sar-e Pol Province since attacks began before the new year, with Afghan security force casualties totaling about 40 dead or wounded. A provincial government spokesperson described the security situation as "alarming", and an aide to interior minister Amrullah Saleh said reinforcements had been sent and a team from Kabul would soon arrive.
- January 4 – The World Health Organization declared the country (along with Pakistan) to be the "final wild poliovirus bastion" with less than 30 reported cases in 2018, and committed to help both governments tackle polio in its last strongholds and get rid of the debilitating disease for good.
- January 6 – At least 30 workers illegally mining gold in a riverbed on behalf of a mining company were killed during a landslide and flash flood in Badakhshan Province's Kohistan District, officials said.
- January 10 – Taliban attacks in northern Balkh Province blocked major highways, including to the capital, and killed more than 30 police and soldiers. American and Afghan air forces retaliated, leading to large numbers of Taliban casualties. Other attacks in Herat and Badghis provinces caused additional security force deaths and injuries, while the insurgents also suffered more casualties. Meanwhile, a senior ISIS-K commander was killed in a raid in Nangarhar Province according to a U.S. forces spokesman. He was reported to have facilitated major attacks and provided ISIS-K bombmakers with explosive materials.
- January 11 – Mohasif Motawakil, a former translator for U.S. forces in Afghanistan, was detained at Houston Intercontinental Airport by U.S. Customs and Border Protection and threatened with deportation to Kabul just hours after arriving from there, along with his wife and five children. Motawakil and his family were denied access to legal counsel at the airport before his wife and children were paroled to a hotel, while Motawakil was still being held at the airport. Motawakil was released a week later after legal intervention, and he and his family had their visas reinstated.
- January 11 – Kabul's air quality ranked the worst in the world. The WHO estimated more than 17,000 Afghanis suffered premature death from air pollution in 2016, but Afghan health officials did not have data to confirm this. Current and former officials said the government could not curb coal consumption and vehicle exhaust, causes Kabul's thick smog.
- January 14 – A truck bomb in Kabul killed 4 and wounded at least 40 near the Green Village compound in Police District 9 (near Hamid Karzai International Airport). The Taliban later claimed responsibility.
- January 15 – Shortly after U.S. special envoy Zalmay Khalilzad arrived in Kabul for talks to Afghan government officials, the Taliban issued a statement threatening to end talks with the U.S., accusing Washington of trying to expand the agenda (possibly referring to direct talks between the Taliban and Afghan government). Also, Taliban leader Hafiz Mohibullah was reported arrested and released in Pakistan.
- January 18 – A U.S. Army Ranger died of combat wounds sustained from small arms fire in Badghis Province's Jawand District according to a military statement. His was the first reported U.S. military death in Afghanistan in 2019.
- January 20 – Afghan president Ashraf Ghani and chief executive Abdullah Abdullah both registered to be among the 14 candidates for the 2019 Afghan presidential election in July, reprising the 2014 contest.
- January 20 – The Taliban claimed responsibility for a car bomb attack on eastern Logar Province's governor and his convoy, which killed eight security forces and wounded at least 10 on the highway to Kabul. The governor and the provincial head of the National Directorate of Security (NDS) were uninjured.
- January 21 – The Taliban attacked an NDS training base in Maidan Wardak Province with a captured military vehicle bomb, killing at least 126 and wounding at least 58 (some reports indicated higher casualties). The victims of the attack were personnel of National Directorate of Security (NDS). Later the NDS announced that the Taliban mastermind of the attack had been killed in an airstrike, though the Talibans denied this. Similarly residents and local officials in the area also rejected Afghan security officials claims and said that six civilians were killed in the Afghan airstrike.
- January 22 – A U.S. Army Special Forces soldier died of combat wounds sustained from small arms fire in Uruzgan Province's Tarin Kowt District according to a military statement. His was the second reported U.S. military death in Afghanistan in 2019. Meanwhile, U.S. special envoy Zalmay Khalilzad met with Taliban representatives in Doha, Qatar following their decision to resume talks after threatening withdrawal.
- January 24 – As talks between the Taliban and U.S. negotiators continued in Doha, the outlines of an agreement emerged in which the U.S. would withdraw troops in return for the Taliban pledging terrorist groups like Al-Qaeda would not be allowed to remain. The Taliban announced as their new chief negotiator Mullah Abdul Ghani Baradar, who was recently released from Pakistani custody.

=== February ===
During the last quarter of 2018, the U.S. military quietly ended Operation Iron Tempest, a series of air and artillery strikes begun in late 2017 with the goal of denying illicit drug revenues to the Taliban. According to the U.S. Special Inspector General for Afghanistan Reconstruction, the campaign involving America's most sophisticated air attack capabilities did little to impact the illegal drug trade; Afghanistan continues record high opium production, at levels more than twice those when U.S. intervention began in 2001.

- February 5 – Taliban fighters attacked an Afghan army post in northern Kunduz Province, killing at least 23 soldiers and 3 police officers; the previous night, other insurgents attacked a police checkpoint in neighboring Baghlan Province, killing at least 10 officers. Meanwhile, in Moscow, Taliban negotiators met with Afghan political opposition figures, including former president Hamid Karzai. Former Taliban chief negotiator Sher Mohammad Abbas Stanikzai stated in an interview that the group did not want to seize "the [whole] country by military power", but also would not agree to a ceasefire until all foreign forces withdraw.
- February 8 – Afghan and American forces struck Taliban units in Kandahar, Helmand, and Nangarhar provinces, killing two low-level Taliban commanders and an intelligence chief. This continued a trend of increased U.S. air and special operations attacks at the highest levels since 2014, intended to give American negotiators leverage in peace talks; two senior Afghan officials said the Taliban complained about the pace of air attacks during negotiations with U.S. envoy Zalmay Khalilzad.
- February 11 – Acting U.S. secretary of defense Patrick M. Shanahan made an unannounced visit, meeting with U.S. commanders and Afghan leaders in Kabul before going to a military base to meet Afghan army commandos.
- February 14 – At least 20 of 34 provinces faced severe drought, and the UN reported return of more than 36,000 undocumented refugees from Iran and Pakistan and nearly 2,400 IDPs. Crisis and stressed food insecurity outcomes persisted through most of the country, while areas of Daykundi Province and the Wakhan Corridor in Badakhshan Province faced emergency levels of acute food insecurity. Humanitarian assistance prevented worse levels in most-affected areas including Badakhshan, Badghis, Ghor, and Nuristan Provinces.
- February 16 – Afghan president Ashraf Ghani had little contact with the media at the Munich Security Conference, and organizers did not put Afghanistan's conflict high on the agenda. Former NATO secretary general Jaap de Hoop Scheffer warned against an expedited withdrawal of U.S. troops, while former U.S. secretary of defense William Cohen said it would not be easy for the U.S. to pull out. Conference observers reportedly gleaned that Ghani appears to be an increasingly isolated figure. After meeting with Ghani at the conference, a bipartisan group of U.S. lawmakers warned against a wider drawdown like the one contemplated in Syria.
- February 17 – The Taliban announced a delegation had been forced to postpone travel to Islamabad to meet with Pakistan's prime minister Imran Khan and U.S. negotiators. Afghanistan's deputy representative to the United Nations submitted a letter to the Security Council stating the trip posed a threat to the security and stability of the country, but other reasons for the cancellation included internal Taliban dissension over the appearance of close ties to Pakistan.
- February 24 – Afghanistan defeated Ireland in all three matches of the Twenty20 International cricket series at Rajiv Gandhi International Cricket Stadium, Dehradun, India. In the second match, Afghanistan set the world record for the highest ever T20 score, international or domestic.
- February 28 – The U.S. military was developing a plan, shared with European allies, to withdraw all American troops in three to five years. Half of the 14,000 troops would be withdrawn in coming months, with the remainder focused on counterterrorism strikes while NATO and other troops continued to train the Afghan military. The plan was being offered in renewed U.S. peace talks with the Taliban in Doha, Qatar which included American commander General Scott Miller. Meanwhile, a Chinese military spokesman denied having troops in the Wakhan Corridor, even while defending its military cooperation with neighboring Tajikistan.

=== March ===
- March 1 - Taliban suicide bombers and gunmen made an early morning attack on Afghan forces at Helmand Province's Camp Shorabak, killing and wounding dozens during another round of talks between U.S. and Taliban negotiators. According to an American military spokesman, U.S. Marine advisers (who suffered no casualties) helped Afghan troops repel the attack with air support.
- March 3 - Heavy rains caused deadly flooding across the south of the country, including Kandahar Province where at least 20 people were killed. At least 10 people including children were missing, and up to 2,000 homes damaged. Heavy snow had already made travel difficult and dangerous, hampering flood rescue and recovery according to the provincial governor's office.
- March 6 - A suicide bomb and gun attack on a construction company near the Jalalabad Airport in Nangarhar Province killed 16 company employees and an Afghan intelligence officer and lasted over five hours. Afghan forces with U.S. assistance overcame and killed the five attackers, who were later claimed by ISIS-K.
- March 6 - Reportedly 59 people were killed due to heavy rains, Flash flooding and snowfall in past two weeks across Afghanistan, left thousands homeless, with the southern provinces of Helmand and Kandahar the worst-hit.
- March 14 - National security adviser Hamdullah Mohib condemned U.S. peace talks with the Taliban as "the wrong approach" and "delegitimizing the Afghan government", singling out U.S. envoy Zalmay Khalilzad in particular as weakening president Ashraf Ghani so he could take over as viceroy. Mohib was subsequently summoned to the U.S. State Department to meet with undersecretary David Hale, who conveyed American displeasure with the remarks.
- March 17 - The Taliban captured 150 Afghan army border troops in Badghis Province's Murghab District, after the soldiers fled to Turkmenistan but were later forced back. The capture was considered the largest Afghan security force loss since the Ghazni offensive in August 2018. Afghan forces suffered an additional 44 casualties during the week and the district was considered on the verge of collapse in spite of reinforcements.
- March 18 - Afghanistan earned a seven-wicket victory over Ireland at Rajiv Gandhi International Cricket Stadium, Dehradun, India in its first-ever Test cricket win. The match took four days and was considered historic and a cause for celebration.
- March 20 - The electoral authority once again delayed the upcoming presidential election, this time by two months from July 20 to September 28. A spokesman for the Independent Election Commission blamed the delay on changes in election laws along with management and technical problems—the presidential vote will now coincide with local council votes and delayed parliamentary elections in Ghazni Province.
- March 21 - ISIS-K claimed three bomb attacks in Kabul, near Kabul University and Karte Sakhi Shrine, which targeted Shiite worshippers celebrating Nowruz, the Persian new year. The blasts killed 6 and injured at least 23.
- March 22 - A U.S. Army Special Forces non-commissioned officer and an explosive ordnance disposal specialist were killed while conducting an operation, according to a statement from the NATO-led force—American defense officials indicated they were killed while working with Afghan forces in northern Kunduz Province against the Taliban, and the Afghans also suffered casualties. The service members represented the third and fourth American military deaths in-country this year.
- March 23
  - The governor of Helmand Province was knocked over but not seriously injured in bomb blasts which killed 4 and wounded 31 at the Lashkar Gah stadium. The Taliban later claimed responsibility for the attack, which came during Farmer's Day celebrations associated with the Persian new year.
  - Ten children, part of the same extended family, were killed by a US air strike in Kunduz, along with three adult civilians, the United Nations said.
- March 27 - Pakistan's human rights minister Shireen Mazari referred to U.S. ambassador John R. Bass as a "little pygmy" in a tweet, responding to the ambassador's tweet using a cricket metaphor to advise Pakistani prime minister Imran Khan not to interfere in the Afghan peace process. The ambassador's tweet came in response to remarks by Khan about an interim government that caused Afghanistan to temporarily recall its ambassador from Islamabad.
- March 29 - Ruinous flash flooding struck in northern Badghis and western Herat Provinces among other northerly locations, killing at least 16, injuring at least 9, and damaging nearly 400 homes; hundreds of cattle were also killed. Thousands of people, including farmers, may have been affected by storms some called the worst in 20 years. The impact is magnified by the extended drought already suffered by the region.
- March 30 - Vice president Abdul Rashid Dostum escaped an expected assassination attempt while traveling from Mazar-e-Sharif to Jawzjan Province, though one of his bodyguards was killed. No group took responsibility for this second attack in eight months, though ISIS-K claimed the previous attempt.
- March 31 - Reportedly heavy rains caused deadly flooding across the south of the country, including Herat Province, at least 35 people were killed in three days. At least 12 people including children were missing, and up to 700 homes destroyed.

=== April ===
According to the government and aid organizations, the winter wheat harvest in June and July will be critical due to last year's extreme drought combined with recent flooding. Grain reserves have already been tapped, some farmers already used their seed for bread, farm infrastructure such as canals, wells, and reservoirs has been damaged, and rapid snow melt could wipe out ripe crops. Meanwhile, according to the United Nations Assistance Mission in Afghanistan, civilian casualties declined in the first quarter of 2019 relative to the same period in 2018 (possibly because winter weather reduced suicide bombings), but for the first time since 2009 civilian deaths in the quarter attributed to Afghan government, U.S., and international forces exceeded those attributed to the Taliban and ISIS-K. Aerial operations caused the most civilian deaths, while insurgents caused the most civilian casualties including injuries (more from IED attacks than suicide bombings, a change in trends).

- April 8 - Three U.S. Marines were killed, three injured, and an Afghan contractor wounded by a roadside bomb near the main U.S. base at Bagram Airfield, according to a statement from the NATO-led force—the Taliban claimed it was suicide car bomb. At least five Afghan civilians were also wounded in the aftermath. These deaths bring to seven the number of American military deaths in-country this year.
- April 12 - Reportedly 77 people were killed from March to early April due to heavy rains and snowfall which caused deadly flooding across the country, Herat, Helmand, Badghis were the worst-hit. More than 42,000 people have been displaced by the floods, thousands of homes have been destroyed and up to 163,000 people needs urgent help but humanitarian agencies are being prevented for providing assistance to affected people due to roadblocks or deteriorating security conditions.
- April 18 - A scheduled meeting in Doha between government officials and the Taliban collapsed over disagreements about the scope of the government delegation. President Ashraf Ghani's office blamed Qatari officials, while the Taliban criticized the delegation for claiming to represent the government and people. U.S. special envoy Zalmay Khalilzad expressed disappointment in the delay.
- April 20 - A suicide attack on the Communications Ministry in Kabul ended with all five attackers dead, while four civilians and three police officers were killed. ISIS-K later claimed responsibility, which caused the evacuation of two government ministries.
- April 26 - U.S. special envoy Zalmay Khalilzad hailed as a "milestone" an agreement between the United States, Russia, and China to support an "inclusive Afghan-led" peace process, including orderly and responsible withdrawal of foreign troops and a Taliban "commitment" to fight ISIS-K and cut ties with al-Qaeda. The three countries also called on the Taliban to speak with a "broad, representative" Afghan delegation including the government as soon as possible.
- April 30 - Afghan government forces undertook clearing operations directed against both ISIS-K and the Taliban in eastern Nangarhar Province, after the two groups fought for over a week over a group of villages in an area of illegal talc mining. The National Directorate of Security claimed 22 ISIS-K fighters were killed and two weapons caches destroyed, while the Taliban claimed US-backed Afghan forces killed seven civilians; a provincial official said over 9,000 families had been displaced by the fighting.

=== May ===
- May 3 - The Taliban rejected calls for a Ramadan ceasefire made by a nationwide assembly, or loya jirga, in Kabul. Responding to the 3,200 religious leaders, politicians, and representatives, president Ashraf Ghani agreed to a truce as long as it was not one-sided, and made a goodwill gesture by agreeing to release 175 prisoners. The Taliban also continues to reject direct talks with the Afghan government, and responded to a U.S. call to lay down arms during ongoing talks in Doha by demanding the U.S. end the use of force instead.
- May 8 - The Taliban claimed an attack on the Kabul compound of U.S.-based aid organization Counterpart International in which four civilians and a policeman were killed and 24 others were wounded. All five insurgents were killed after a huge explosion and more than six-hour battle with security forces during which 200 people in the compound were rescued. U.S. Ambassador John R. Bass and the United Nations Assistance Mission in Afghanistan both condemned the attack on an aid organization.
- May 16 - U.S. airstrikes near Lashkar Gah in southern Helmand Province killed as many as 18 Afghan police officers in what U.S. military officials described as a "tragic accident." A U.S. spokesman said Afghan forces requested air support during heavy fighting with the Taliban, but the target areas were not clear of friendly forces despite U.S. coordinators confirming they were. An unknown number of Taliban fighters were also killed.
- May 24 - 2019 Kabul mosque bombing
- May 31 - Despite earlier concerns, positive development of winter wheat crops is most likely leading to a near-average harvest. Food security outcomes across the country are most likely to continue to gradually improve as the main harvest begins, and above average cumulative 2018/19 precipitation is supporting favorable wheat and pasture development. The 2019 spring flooding occurred at near average levels, with only localized impacts on the cereal harvests. Income from labor and remittances remains below-average. Overall, agriculture labor availability is similar to average; however, wages are below average.

=== June ===
Afghanistan overtook Syria as the least peaceful country in the world, according to the Global Peace Index from the Australia-based Institute for Economics and Peace. In the past year, Afghanistan also had the largest deterioration in confidence in the local police among all nations surveyed, falling by 32 percentage points.

- June 3 - Negotiations failed to create a truce for the three-day Eid al-Fitr festival ending the Muslim holy month of Ramadan, disappointing civilians who had hoped for a ceasefire similar to that which occurred last year. Violence spiked toward the end of the holy month, leaving at least 17 dead and dozens injured.
- June 13 - An ancient tower in eastern Ghazni collapsed due mostly to vulnerability to rain damage according to a government spokesman, one of dozens already destroyed in the city. Critics accuse the government of negligence in protecting the city's Islamic and pre-Islamic architecture.
- June 25 - A U.S. Army Special Forces non-commissioned officer (NCO) and an explosive ordnance disposal NCO died from wounds they sustained from small arms fire during a Taliban attack in central Uruzgan Province, the Pentagon said. Their deaths are the 10th and 11th U.S. fatalities in Afghanistan this year, nine of them from hostile fire.
- June 29:
  - A Taliban attack on pro-government militia security posts in northern Baghlan Province killed at least 27 militia members, while U.S. envoy Zalmay Khalilzad opened the seventh round of talks with the Taliban in Doha. One U.S. official called the meeting a "make-or-break moment" in war termination efforts.
  - Afghan and Pakistani cricket fans clashed violently inside and outside Headingley Cricket Ground in Leeds, England during the ICC World Cup 2019 match between their respective sides. Pakistan ultimately won the match by 3 wickets.

=== July ===
- July 1 - July 2019 Kabul attack
- July 7 - 2019 Ghazni bombing
- July 15 - A Taliban ambush in the northwestern province of Badghis killed 25 elite Afghan commandos. 20 militants were also killed in the assault.
- July 18 - A Taliban double suicide car bombing and shooting attack on a Kandahar police headquarters killed 12 people including civilians and injured almost 90 others.
- July 19 - Eight people were killed and 33 injured in a blast outside of Kabul University. There was no immediate claim of responsibility.

=== August ===
- August 7 - A car bombing by the Taliban killed 14 and injured over 15.
- August 17 - 17 August 2019 Kabul bombing: A suicide bomber killed at least 80 and wounded more than 160 people at a wedding hall in Afghanistan's capital, Kabul. It is believed that over 1,000 people were attending the wedding when the explosion took place. The Taliban immediately denied responsibility for carrying out the attack.
- August 21 - The United States military command confirmed that two of its soldiers, from Army Special Forces unit, were killed in Afghanistan, certainly during a firefight.

=== September ===
- September 2 - A Taliban claimed suicide car bombing near a compound in Kabul that houses numerous international organizations killed 16 people and injured over 100 more.
- September 4 - Afghani human rights activist Abdul Samad Amiri is shot to death by Taliban militants.
- September 5 - A suicide car bomb attack, claimed by Taliban, killed 10 people and wounded dozens in Kabul. The attack was carried out in a diplomatic area near the US embassy.
- September 11 - An explosion was heard in Kabul, near the US Embassy, shortly after midnight on the 9/11 anniversary. An embassy employee reached by phone confirmed the blast but had no details. It was the first major attack in Kabul since President Donald Trump abruptly called off United States-Taliban talks on the brink of an apparent deal to end America's longest war.
- September 17 - Taliban claims responsibility for 2 suicide bombings that killed at least 48 people in Kabul and Charikar, where president Ashraf Ghani was hosting a rally.
- September 19 - 2019 Qalat bombing: A Taliban car bomb at a Qalat hospital in the southern Zabul Province killed at least 20 people and injured 90 others. A government intelligence building next door was the intended target.
- September 20 - 30 nut farmers are killed and 40 are injured in a U.S. drone attack in Nangarhar Province. The attack was intended to destroy an ISIS-K hideout.
- September 23 - 40 civilians attending a wedding were killed in an attack by the Afghan National Security Forces on a Taliban hideout in Helmand Province. 22 Taliban members were killed and 14 arrested.
- September 28 - 2019 Afghan presidential election

== Deaths ==
- January 13: Meddock, Cameron A
- January 22: Beale, Joshua Z
- March 22: Lindsay, Will D
- March 22: Collette, Joseph P
- April 4: Hendriks, Robert A
- April 4: Hines, Benjamin S
- April 4: Slutman, Christopher
- May 6: Holmes, Miguel
- June 28: Mills, Justice Taylor
