= 2021 in Afghanistan =

- Decades: 2000s; 2010s; 2020s
- See also: Other events of 2021; List of years in Afghanistan

The year 2021 in Afghanistan was marked by a major offensive from the Taliban beginning in May and the Taliban capturing Kabul in August.

== Incumbents ==
Photo	Post	State	Name	Dates
	President	Islamic Republic of Afghanistan	Ashraf Ghani	29 September 2014 – 15 August 2021
Saleh / Danish	Vice President	Islamic Republic of Afghanistan	Amrullah Saleh (first); Sarwar Danish (second)	19 February 2020 – 15 August 2021 (Saleh); 29 September 2014 – 15 August 2021 (Danish)
	Speaker of the House of the People	Islamic Republic of Afghanistan	Mir Rahman Rahmani	29 June 2019 – 15 August 2021
	Speaker of the House of Elders	Islamic Republic of Afghanistan	Fazel Hadi Muslimyar	29 January 2011 – 15 August 2021
	Chief Justice	Islamic Republic of Afghanistan	Sayed Yousuf Halim	October 2014 – 15 August 2021
	Chief Justice	Islamic Emirate of Afghanistan	Abdul Hakim Haqqani	15 August 2021 – present
	Supreme Leader	Islamic Emirate of Afghanistan	Hibatullah Akhundzada	15 August 2021 – present
	Acting Prime Minister	Islamic Emirate of Afghanistan	Hasan Akhund	7 September 2021 – present
Haqqani / Yaqoob; Baradar	Deputy Leader	Islamic Emirate of Afghanistan	Sirajuddin Haqqani (first); Mullah Yaqoob (second); Abdul Ghani Baradar (third)	15 August 2021 – present
Baradar / Hanafi; Kabir	Acting Deputy Prime Minister	Islamic Emirate of Afghanistan	Abdul Ghani Baradar (first); Abdul Salam Hanafi (second); Abdul Kabir (third)	7 September 2021 – present

== Events ==
=== January ===
- 1 January – Journalist and human rights activist Bismillah Aimaq is shot dead in the province of Ghor.
- 5 January – Afghan delegates meet with Taliban leaders in Doha, Qatar, to reopen peace talks.

=== March ===
- 30 March – Three polio vaccine workers are killed by gunmen in Jalalabad, Nangarhar Province.

=== April ===
- 13 April – President of the United States Joe Biden announces plans to withdraw U.S troops from Afghanistan by 11 September.
- 30 April – At least 30 are killed, and more than 90 are wounded by an explosion outside a guesthouse in Puli Alam, Logar Province.

=== May ===
- 1 May – The 2021 Taliban offensive begins.
- 2 May – The Taliban threatens further attacks as the deadline for withdrawal passes 1 May, when previous US President Donald Trump said US forces would withdraw from Afghanistan.
- 6 May
  - High-profile Afghan reporter Newat Rawan is shot dead by an unidentified assailant in Kandahar.
  - Taliban fighters capture Afghanistan's second largest dam and key army bases as their insurgency intensifies across the country.
- 8 May – A car bomb and two other improvised explosive devices explode outside a secondary school in the Dashte Barchi neighborhood in western Kabul, killing at least 68 people, most of whom were students.
- 14 May – At least 12 worshippers are killed when a ISIL-KP bomb explodes inside a mosque in Kabul.

=== June ===
- 1 June – Multiple explosions targeting ethnic Hazaras killed at least 12.
- 8 June – The government announces that the COVID-19 pandemic situation in the country is under control.
- 17 June – The Taliban capture Dawlat Abad District, killing at least 24 Afghan commandos and five police officers in the process.
- 30 June – The Taliban capture 700 trucks and Humvees from the Afghan National Army as more districts fall under the group's control during their offensive in the north.

=== July ===
- 2 July – Germany and Italy withdraw their troops from Afghanistan. U.S. troops leave Bagram Airfield, handing it to the Afghan Armed Forces.
- 3 July – More than 1,000 Afghan border guards and soldiers cross the state border with Tajikistan to flee from Taliban forces. According to Tajik authorities Hohon, Shahri Buzurg and Rogiston county of Badakhshan Province fell to the Taliban. Tajik forces allow the retreating Afghan servicemen to cross into their territory.
- 22 July – At least 100 people are massacred in a mass shooting in Spin Boldak District, Kandahar Province.

=== August ===
- 3 August – A suspected Taliban suicide car bomber and gunmen attack the house of Afghan Defence Minister Bismillah Khan Mohammadi, killing 13 people, including five attackers. Mohammadi was unharmed in the attack.
- 6 August – Zaranj, the capital of Nimruz, is captured by Taliban insurgents after fierce fighting in the region.
- 7 August – The Taliban seizes Sheberghan, the capital of Jowzjan Province.
- 8 August – Taliban capture provincial capital of Sar-e-Pol, Kunduz and Taloqan as fighting rages across the country.
- 9 August – Taliban fighters seize provincial capital of Aybak.
- 10 August – Taliban fighters capture provincial capitals of Farah and Puli Khumri.
- 11 August
  - Afghan government replaces army chief General Wali Mohammad.
  - President Ashraf Ghani fly to Mazar-i-Sharif and holds talks with local Uzbeks and Tajiks figures.
  - Fayzabad, capital of Badakhshan Province, is seized by the Taliban.
- 12 August – Taliban capture provincial capital of Ghazni. Afghanistan's third largest city, Herat, also fell to the insurgents. The group later seizes the country's second-largest city, Kandahar.
- 13 August
  - Capital of Helmand Province, Lashkar Gah, fell to the Taliban. The insurgents also captured Qalati Ghilji, Terenkot, Puli Alam, Feruz Koh and Qal-e-Naw. As of 13 August, a total of 18 provincial capitals have been seized by the Taliban.
  - Finland, Denmark and Switzerland announced plans to withdraw their consulate workers amidst advancing Taliban fighters.
  - United Kingdom announces Operation Pitting which goal is to evacuate its citizens out of Afghanistan.
- 14 August
  - President Ashraf Ghani addresses the nation as the Taliban makes rapid gains.
  - United States announces that it will deploy 3,000 troops to Afghanistan to help with the evacuation process from the country. Additional 5,000 troops will also be deployed.
  - Mazar-i-Sharif, the last anti-Taliban stronghold in Northern Afghanistan, is captured by the Taliban, signifying the near collapse of Afghan government control in the north. Taliban also capture the provincial capital of Asadabad, Gardez, Maymana, Mihtarlam, Nili and Sharana. More than half of the country's provinces have been seized by the insurgents.
- 15 August
  - As the Taliban advances to Kabul, incumbent Afghan President Ashraf Ghani decided to flee the country.
  - Taliban captures Kabul with little resistance, marking the beginning of Taliban rule over Afghanistan.
- 16 August - At least seven people are killed after thousands flocked to Kabul's Hamid Karzai International Airport in an attempt to flee from Taliban rule of Afghanistan.
- 17 August - Incumbent Afghan Vice President Amrullah Saleh declares himself as caretaker president of Afghanistan and set up a resistance in Panjshir Province, the last government-controlled Afghan province.
- 26 August
  - 2021 Kabul airport attack – Explosion go off on gates outside Hamid Karzai International Airport. At least 182 are killed, and at least 150 are injured.
  - The Panjshir conflict has a ceasefire after 10 days.
- 29 August - U.S. army launches drone strike at a residential area in Kabul following reports of a possible terrorist attack in Kabul Airport, killing ten people, including seven children.
- 30 August
  - The last American military plane evacuates Maj. Gen. Chris Donahue, commander of the US Army 82nd Airborne Division, and officially ends 20 years of American military involvement in Afghanistan.

=== September ===
- 4 September
  - Taliban announces victory over Panjshir Valley, claims full control of Afghanistan.
  - At least 17 deaths and 40 injuries are reported due to the Taliban's celebratory gunfire following the announcement of the Taliban's victory over Panjshir.
  - Panjshir rebels deny Taliban claim over the rebel-held region.
- 7 September
  - Chief spokesman of Taliban announces list of cabinet members for the new caretaker government of Afghanistan. Prominent Talib figure Mohammad Hasan Akhund is appointed as the head of the government.
- 11 September - Flag of Islamic Emirate of Afghanistan is raised for the first time since 2001.
- 12 September - Taliban announces gender segregation and new dress code in schools and educational institutions.

=== October ===
- 8 October - 2021 Kunduz mosque bombing
- 15 October - 2021 Kandahar bombing

== Timelines ==
- List of 2021 Afghanistan attacks

== See also ==
- 2021 Taliban offensive
- History of Afghanistan
- Outline of Afghanistan
- Politics of Afghanistan
- Government of Afghanistan
- COVID-19 pandemic in Afghanistan
- 2020s in political history
