= 2017 in Afghanistan =

- Decades: 1990s; 2000s; 2010s; 2020s
- See also: Other events of 2017; List of years in Afghanistan

Events in the year 2017 in Afghanistan.

== Incumbents ==
- President: Ashraf Ghani
- Chief Executive Officer: Abdullah Abdullah

=== January ===
- January 1 – Rangers from 2nd Battalion, 75th Ranger Regiment, carried out a raid on an ISIL-KP commander operating in the country. Despite being wounded by a grenade blast, SFC Joshua Leach held off enemy fighters alone with his weapon for three minutes, whilst under direct AK-47, AK-74, AKS-74, AKS-74U and grenade fire, allowing two wounded Rangers with a wounded Afghan soldier to leave the compound. Leach was awarded the Silver Star.
- January 9 – NDS forces killed Qari Saifullah Akhtar, a top al-Qaeda leader, and another terrorist in a raid in Ghazni Province.
- January 10 – The January 2017 Afghanistan bombings kill over 60 people and injure nearly 100 more.
- January 29 – It was reported that at least six armed militants were killed and six heroin laboratories destroyed in a military operation in Bando village, Helmand Province- an area "under the Taliban or contested". The Ministry of Interior said that 1,090 kg of morphine, 15,175 kg of ammonium chloride and 2,000 litres of liquid opium, which is used in making heroin, were also destroyed.
- January 30/31 – Taliban fighters used tunnels to attack government checkpoints in the town centre of the Sangin District, Helmand Province, Afghan officials said 10 to more than 20 soldiers had been killed. In response, Brigadier General Charles H. Cleveland said that in the following 48 hours, the US military carried out approximately 15 airstrikes, 10 of which were in and around the town of Sangin.

=== February ===
- February 4 – The 2017 Afghanistan avalanches killed at least 143 and injured 103 people.
- February 7 – A suicide bombing outside the Supreme Court of Afghanistan in Kabul killed 20 people and injured 48 more. Also that day in a roadside bomb in western Farah Province killed the regions top police official, the Taliban claimed responsibility for the attack.
- February 8 – Six Afghans working for the Red Cross were killed by suspected ISIL-KP gunmen and Two others are unaccounted for, possibly abducted, by IS in the Qush Tepa District, Jowzjan Province.
- February 9 – A U.S. Special Forces soldier was severely wounded when the base he was at was attacked in Helmand province, another soldier was also wounded that day in Helmand Province.
- February 11 – A Taliban suicide bomber killed seven and wounded 20 people outside a bank in Lashkar Gah, Helmand Province.
- February 16 – Pakistan closed the Torkham and Chaman crossing in response to a series of terrorist attacks across Pakistan blamed on militant groups based in Afghanistan.
- February 23 – The Taliban successfully take over the entirety of Shorabak District, Kandahar Province.
- February 24 – 10 police officers and a civilian in an ambush by IS militants in Zawzjan province.
- February 26 – A U.S. drone strike killed the senior Taliban commander for Kunduz province, Mullah Abdul Salam Akhund, and eight other militants.

=== March ===
- March 1 – The Taliban attacked police, military and intelligence targets in Kabul, killing at least 15 people and wounding dozens.
- March 7 – Pakistan temporarily reopened the Torkham and Chaman crossings with Afghanistan for 48 hours to allow visitors with valid visas on both sides to return home.
- March 8 – Four ISIL-KP militants attacked Sardar Mohammad Daud Khan hospital, the largest military hospital in Kabul, killing more than 30 people and injuring more than 50. Afghan commandos killed all four attackers after several hours of fighting.
- March 12 – At least 31 Taliban militants were killed and nine wounded during the past 24 hours in a military operation carried out in Bulan village in PD3 of Lashkargah city, officials said.
- March 13 – A suicide bomber crashed a vehicle full of explosives into a packed commuter minibus in Kabul, killing at least one and injuring at least 19 people.
- March 17 – A suicide truck bomber attacked a military checkpoint in Khost province, killing an Afghan soldier and wounding ten more, after the blast, two Taliban gunmen opened fire at the troops, triggering a shootout that left both militants dead. Elsewhere in outside a mosque in eastern Nangarhar province the brother of a local religious affairs director who had been targeted for assassination.
- March 19 – Three American troops were wounded after an Afghan soldier opened fire on them at Camp Shorabak air base in Helmand province. Also that day, a US airstrike killed al Qaeda leader Qari Yasin Paktika Province, Yasin had ties to the TTP and was responsible for the 2008 Islamabad Marriott Hotel bombing and the 2009 attack on the Sri Lanka national cricket team. Two Taliban commanders were also killed in apparent US drone strike in Barmal district and another ten insurgents were killed in a separate drone strike in Dand-e Patan district, Paktika province. A Green Beret from 1st Battalion 7th SFG died in a noncombat-related incident in Logar Province. Taliban insurgents attacked a district headquarters in Kandahar province with a suicide car bomb killing six policemen and wounding others. An operation carried out by the army in southern Zabul province killed 13 Taliban militants and wounded 11 others, whilst the Afghans suffered two Afghan soldiers killed and three others wounded by a roadside bomb.
- March 20 – A car bombing next to a security checkpoint, known as Sangorian in Gereshk district had killed three pro-government militia members and injured eight others in Helmand province, a local official said.
- March 22 – A local police officer shot dead nine of his colleagues at a check post in northern Kunduz province, before fleeing to the Taliban, local officials said.
- March 23 – Taliban fighters overran the district center of Sangin District in Helmand Province early morning after clashes with Afghan Security Forces on the previous day.

=== April ===
- April 2 – At least nine civilian were killed when an Afghan army commando unit detonated an ordnance cache of explosives and ammunition they found in Lashkar Gah, Helmand province.
- April 5 – Local media reported that Syed Omar Bajawari, one of the most senior leaders of ISIL, was killed in Achin District, Nangarhar province along with at least 24 militants during a counterterrorism operation.
- April 8 – A Green Beret from 1st Battalion 7th SFG died of wounds caused by enemy small arms fire an operation against ISIS in Nangarhar Province, marking the first American combat death of the year in the country. An Afghan official says a roadside bomb killed at least nine security forces in Chimtal District, Balkh Province. Another five Taliban insurgents were also killed and dozens wounded. In Kunduz province, 18 Taliban militants were killed, including a key commander, Mawlawi Wahidullah and eight others injured when aircraft targeted Taliban hideouts in Dasht-e-Archi and Chardara districts.
- April 9 – ISIL-KP ambushes Afghan soldiers in Darzab District, starting the Battle of Darzab (2017).
- April 12 – An ISIL-KP suicide bomber killed five people and wounded several more in an explosion near the Afghan Defense Ministry in Kabul.
- April 13 – The Nangarhar airstrike takes place, a GBU-43/B MOAB bomb dropped from a U.S. Lockheed MC-130 on a complex of tunnels and bunkers, used by ISIS-K in Achin district, Nangarhar Province, killing at least 94 ISIL-KP militants, including 4 commanders.
- April 17 – An airstrike in Archi district, Kunduz province, killed Quari Tayib, a Taliban “shadow governor” for Takhar province, whom The Pentagon said in a statement was a "target of interest since 2011 and was directly responsible for deaths of US service members in Afghanistan," 8 other Taliban fighters were killed in the strike. Also that day, an army general and four civilians were killed in a Taliban ambush in Kunduz.
- April 19 – 25 insurgents were killed in an overnight raid, including Taliban shadow governor for Baghlan Province, Maulvi Helal, an official said.
- April 21 – In the 2017 Camp Shaheen attack, Taliban insurgents attacked Afghan soldiers near a mosque at a military base in Mazar-e-Sharif, Balkh province, killing at least 140 Afghan soldiers. A military spokesman said that the insurgents drove through military checkpoints wearing army uniforms to launch the attack. Military headquarters said six insurgents carried out the attack but other officials put the number at 10.
- April 25/26 – ISIL-KP terrorists attacked Taliban insurgents in northern Jawzjan province leading to heavy clashes that lasted into the following day resulting in ISIL-KP seizing two districts from the Taliban and killing 76 of their number, whilst ISIL-KP lost 15 killed. On the evening of April 26, 50 Rangers from 3rd Battalion 75th Ranger Regiment joined 40 Afghan commandos to conduct a joint US-Afghan operation/raid that was targeting the headquarters of Abdul Hasib, the emir of ISIL-KP, in a village in Achin District, Nangarhar Province. The force was flown into Mohmand Valley and within minutes were engaged a heavy, close-quarter firefight, AC-130 gunships, Apache helicopters, F-16 fighters and drones were called into support the force firefight with ISIL-KP militants. The firefight lasted for three hours, resulting in two Rangers dying of their injuries (possibly caused by friendly fire) after being medevaced and a third was also wounded 18 to 35 (including Abdul Hasib and an unspecified number of ISIL-KP leaders) ISIL-KP militants were also killed.
- April 28 – At least 20 IS militants were killed in ground operations by Afghan forces in Momand valley of Achin, Nangarhar province in the preceding 24 hours. Also that day, a total of 200 Afghan soldiers from two companies from the 5th Battalion, 7th Brigade, Afghan Border Police deployed to Zibak District, Badakhshan Province were surrounded and attacked by an estimated 1,500 terrorists. The Afghan forces repelled the enemy fighters several times, when their commander could not get support, he ordered a retreat-abandoning their military vehicles and much of their ammunition.

=== May ===
- May 1–2 – On May 1, after retreating from over rough terrain, the Afghan soldiers from two companies of 5th Battalion, 7th Brigade, Afghan Border Police arrived at Ishkashim, Badakhshan Province. They instantly came under enemy assault and had to call on locals to help them defend their position, by May 2, the group had set up a defence. In Zibak district, a small group of Afghan Special Forces Commandos arrived in an attempt to recapture the region from the terrorists and several airstrikes are said to have been conducted.
- May 3 – A car bomb explodes near the US embassy in Kabul, targeting a NATO convoy. Eight people were killed and over 25 were wounded in the blast, including three US troops. ISIL claims responsibility for the attack.
- May 5 - 2017 Afghanistan-Pakistan border skirmish
- May 17 – ISIL-KP terrorists attacked the Afghan state television building in Jalalabad, the battle lasted for four hours leaving at least six people killed and four terrorists were killed.
- May 21 – A Taliban ambush killed least 20 Afghan policemen and 10 others wounded in Shah Joi district, Zabul province. Also that day, a German aid worker and Afghan guard were killed and a Finnish woman believed kidnapped, when gunmen stormed an international guest house in Kabul.
- May 26 – Taliban militants attacked a military base in Shah Wali Kot District, Kandahar province killing at least 15 Afghan soldiers.
- May 27 – A suicide car bombing in Khost, Khost Province, killed at least 13 people.
- May 31 – May 2017 Kabul attack

=== June ===
- June 3 – 3 June 2017 Kabul bombing
- June 6 – Suspected bomb explosion outside the Jama Masjid in Herat.
- June 10 – A Taliban infiltrator killed three U.S. soldiers and left another wounded in Achin district of Nangarhar province, according to a provincial government official.
- June 15 - June 2017 Kabul mosque attack
- June 22 - June 2017 Lashkargah bombing
- Unknown – An Afghan commando launched multiple rockets at a group of US Army Green Berets, wounding four.

=== July ===
- July 3 – On a joint operation with Afghan troops outside a base in Nawa District Helmand Province, a US Soldier from 1st Stryker Brigade Combat Team, 1st Armored Division was killed and two others wounded by indirect fire during an attack on the base.
- July 11 – A US air strike on an ISIL-KP headquarters in Kunar province killed Abu Sayed, the leader of ISIL-KP, along with other ISIL-KP terrorist.
- July 17 – Afghan security forces, supported by a US Marine unit and numerous US airstrikes, retake Nawa District in Helmand Province from the Taliban.
- July 24 - 24 July 2017 Kabul bombing
- July 31 - 2017 attack on the Iraqi embassy in Kabul

=== August ===
- August 1 - August 2017 Herat mosque attack
- August 2 – A Taliban VBIED suicide attack on a NATO convoy in Kandahar Province killed two US soldiers from 2nd Battalion, 504th Infantry Regiment, 1st Brigade Combat Team, 82nd Airborne Division and wounded four US troops.
- August 3–5 – The Taliban and ISIL-KP militants carried out a joint attack on the village of Mirzawalang in Sayyad district, Sar-e Pol Province, battling with local Afghan police forces for nearly 48 hours, killing over 50 civilians(mostly Shiite Hazaras) and 18 local police and 28 local militia, whilst 10 militants were killed and a further 12 injured. A spokesman for the Afghan Ministry of the Interior, said that the government is planning an operation to retake the area from militants. Also that day, a Taliban suicide bomb attack on a joint NATO-ANA patrol in the Qarabagh district, near Bagram Air Field, Kabul province, one Georgian soldier and wounded three more, as well as wounding two American servicemembers, an afghan interpreter and five others, two Afghan civilians were also killed.
- August 9 – The Taliban released 235 villagers held since the insurgents seized control of Mirzawalang in Sar-e-Pul province. Also that day, gunmen opened fire on a group of four female employees at Bagram Air Field, killing one and wounding a second woman.
- August 10 – A US air strike in Kunar province killed Abdul Rahman, ISIL-KP provincial emir for Kunar Province, and three other senior ISIL-KP terrorists.
- August 12 – Afghan officials claim that as many as 16 civilians were killed in a US airstrike in Nangarhar province, but US officials said only militants were killed.
- August 16 – A Green Beret from 19th SFG was killed by an improvised explosive device during a firefight with ISIS-K militants in Nangarhar province, several Afghan troops and an unknown number of US troops were also wounded during the firefight.
- August 29 – An airstrike by Afghan aircraft on a Taliban base and an insurgent-run prison in Shindand district, Herat Province, killed 16 Taliban militants were killed, between at least 13 and 18 civilians were also killed and seven other civilians were wounded, 19 military and civilian inmates escaped the prison.
- August 29/30 – A US airstrike that was targeting Taliban insurgents occupying a civilian house in Dasht e Barai, Logar Province, killed at least 11 civilians.

=== September ===
- September 1 – The US 774th Expeditionary Airlift Squadron carried out a combat airdrop to ground forces in Afghanistan, the first in more than two years.
- September 5 – Two Red Cross workers kidnapped by gunmen in February were released.
- September 11 – Five US troops and a NATO servicemember were lightly wounded when their convoy was attacked by a suicide bomber using a VBIED near the village of Qal'eh-ye Musa Bala in Parwan Province.
- September 13 – At least three people were killed in a suicide bombing at a checkpoint at the Kabul International Cricket Stadium during a T20 match.
- September 14 – A Finnish aid worker who was working for Operation Mercy (a Swedish aid group), who was kidnapped by gunmen who stormed an international guest house in Kabul in May was freed.
- September 15 – A car carrying explosives attacked a convoy in Kandahar Province killing 1 Romanian soldier and wounding two more.
- September 27 – As US defence secretary James Mattis and NATO secretary general Jens Stoltenberg were visiting Afghan officials in Kabul, Taliban militants attacked Camp Sullivan (a US embassy compound near Kabul International Airport) with RPGs or mortars-setting a weapons depot on fire which triggered explosions, the militants also attacked three military entrances to the airport with small arms. At least five civilians were wounded, two US, one Afghan military aircraft and a civilian plane were reportedly damaged.
- September 29 – A suicide bomber blew himself up near one of the biggest Shia centers in Kabul, where Ashura was being commemorated. The attack left 6 people dead.

=== October ===
- October 1 – An Afghan Air Force airstrike on a checkpoint in Gereshk, Helmand Province, accidentally killed ten and wounded a further nine members of the Sangoryan militia - a security force that wear local clothing to blend into areas where the Taliban are active.
- October 12 – A US drone strike in Kunar Province killed 14 ISIL-KP terrorists, the spokesman for the provincial governor said the strike targeted a meeting of ISIS-K commanders who were planning a terrorist attack.
- October 17 – Insurgents attacked Gardez, Paktia Province and Ghazni Province. A police training centre in Gardez was attacked. A suicide car bombing was followed by a gun attack. This killed at least 41 people, including the local police chief; 110 civilians and 48 police officers were injured. The Taliban claimed responsibility. On the same day in Ghazni Province, armoured Humvee vehicles filled with explosives were detonated near the provincial governor's office, who were followed by gunmen. They killed 30 people - mostly security personnel; at least 10 other people were injured. The attackers are believed to have been Taliban members.
- October 18 – A US drone strike in Paktia Province killed Omar Khalid Khorasani, the leader of the JuA, and nine other terrorists.
- October 19 – A double suicide bombing on 19 October in Kandahar Province which killed 43 Afghan soldiers and suicide bombings on 20 October in Kabul and Ghor Province which killed at least 60 people.
- October 20 – two Shia Mosques were attacked. One, in Kabul, left at least 30 people dead and at least 45 people injured. The other attack, in the Ghor Province, left at least ten people dead.
- October 27 – A US helicopter from the 160th SOAR crashed in Logar province, killing one and injuring 6 more US servicemembers.

=== November ===
- November 3 – A US airstrike in Char Dara District, Kunduz Province, killed scores of civilians, according to officials and residents in the area-with estimates as high as 55. An Afghan security official said the Taliban had forced locals to carry bodies of dead insurgents just as the strikes took place, however Afghan forces claimed no civilians had been killed.
- November 4 – A Green Beret from 2nd battalion 10th SFG died of injuries sustained during combat operations in Logar Province.
- November 19 – Afghan commandos and coalition forces conducted a nighttime raid on a Taliban-run prison in the village of Now Zad in Helmand Province, freeing 15 people, they also captured several Taliban members and removed bomb-making materials.

=== December ===
- December 1 – A strike in Musa Qala District, Helmand Province, killed Mullah Shah Wali, the leader of Taliban's “Red Unit” along with one of Wali's deputy commanders and three other militants.
- December 18 – ISIL-KP militants stormed a National Directorate of Security training centre in Kabul.
- December 25 – A suicide bomber killed six people and injured a further three near a compound belonging to the Afghan intelligence agency in Kabul.
- December 28 – A suicide bombing targeting the Shia cultural centre in Kabul killed 50 people and injured over 80 more, ISIL carried out the attack.

== Deaths ==
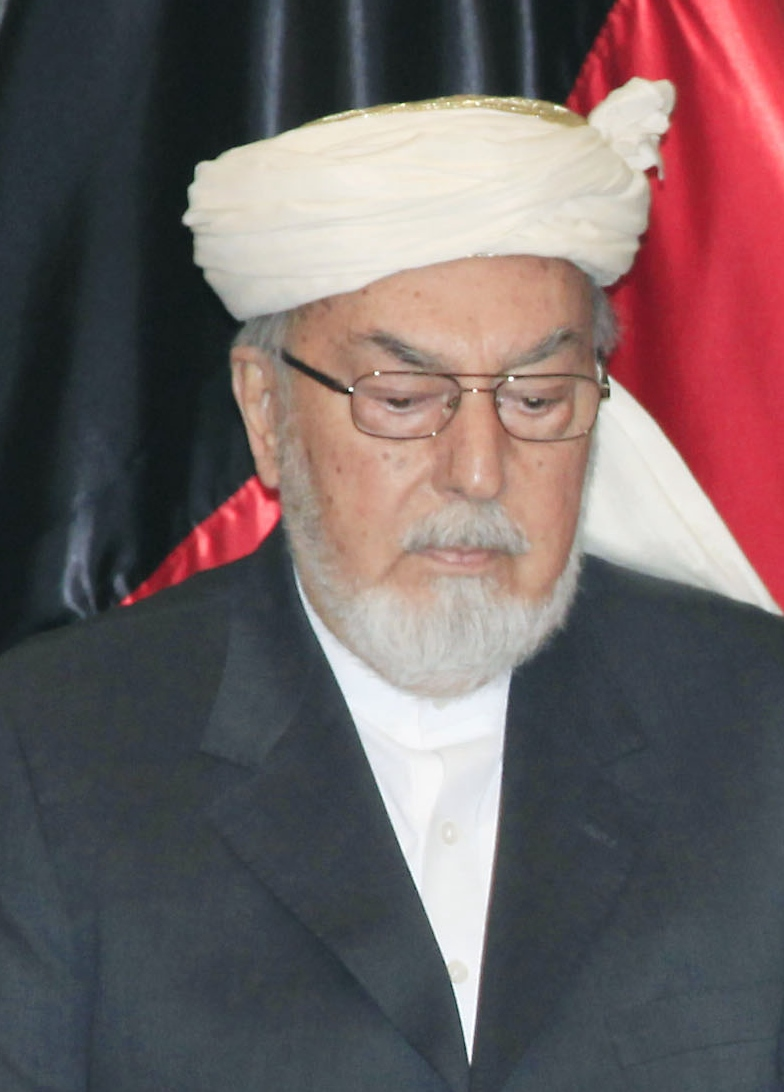
Ahmed Gailani

- 20 January – Ahmed Gailani, founder of the National Islamic Front of Afghanistan (b. 1932).
- 26 February – Abdul Salam, Taliban governor (b. 1968).
- 10 September – Nancy Dupree, American historian who spent decades working to preserve the heritage of Afghanistan (b.1927).
