= 2017 Lashkargah bombing =

2017 Lashkargah bombing may refer to:

- January 2017 Afghanistan bombings, one of which was in Lashkargah
- June 2017 Lashkargah bombing
