= 2018 in Afghanistan =

- Decades: 1990s; 2000s; 2010s; 2020s
- See also: Other events of 2018; List of years in Afghanistan

Events in the year 2018 in Afghanistan.

== Incumbents ==
- President: Ashraf Ghani
- Chief Executive: Abdullah Abdullah
- Speaker of Wolesi Jirga: Abdul Rauf Ibrahimi
- Speaker of Meshrano Jirga: Fazel Hadi Muslimyar
- First Vice President of Afghanistan: Abdul Rashid Dostum
- Second Vice President of Afghanistan: Sarwar Danish
- First Deputy Chief Executive of Afghanistan: Khyal Mohammad Mohammad Khan
- Second Deputy Chief Executive of Afghanistan: Muhammad Mohaqiq

=== January ===
- January 1 – A US Army Special Forces soldier from 2nd Battalion, 10th SFG was killed by small arms fire during a combat engagement whilst on patrol in Achin District, Nangarhar Province. Four other service members were wounded. Also that day, Afghan special forces attacked a Taliban "Red Unit" prison compound in Nahr-e Saraj district, Helmand Province.
- January 16 – Taliban insurgents (whom Afghan officials and a Taliban spokesman said were a Taliban Red Unit) using night vision and laser targeting equipment briefly overran Afghan Army positions in the village of Gholam Sakhi, Kunduz Province, killing at least six soldiers and two police officers and wounding five more.
- January 18 – Afghan commandos carried out a nighttime helicopter assault on a Taliban prison in Nawzad district, Helmand Province, "eliminating" five Taliban fighters guarding it and rescuing 13 prisoners.
- January 20 – US and Afghan forces raided a Taliban prison in Baghran District, Helmand province, rescuing more than 60 Afghan security forces. Also that day, militants of either the Taliban or the Haqqani network carried out the Inter-Continental Hotel attack in Kabul, killing 40 and injuring over 22.
- January 24 – Islamic State militants carried out the Save The Children attack in Jalalabad, killing three and injuring at least 25 others. Air Force Times reported that A-10C Thunderbolt IIs carried out their first strikes since deploying to the country, conducting two sorties on Taliban fighters marked by a US Army drone in Helmand province, who were engaging an Afghan National Defense and Security Forces patrol with small arms and a PK machine gun.
- January 27 – A Taliban suicide attack at a checkpoint in a secure zone-home to government offices and foreign embassies-in Kabul killed at least 103 people and injured 235 others.
- January 28 – Afghan forces captured Khitab Aka, the head facilitator of foreign fighters for ISIS-K, in Jowzjan province.
- January 29 – IS militants attacked the Marshal Fahim National Defense University in Kabul, killing at least 11 soldiers and wounding 16 more, four militants were killed and one captured.
- January 31 – A magnitude 6.1 earthquake struck Afghanistan and Pakistan. One report cited the killing of one girl, and injuries to 10 other persons.

=== February ===
- February 1 – An Afghan special operations unit, backed by US airstrikes launched an offensive against the Taliban in Maiwand and Panjwai districts, Kandahar Province, the National Directorate of Security said that 50 Taliban (including some key commanders) were killed.
- February 4 – A US B-52 dropped 24 precision-guided munitions-the most ever launched by a B-52-on a Taliban training camp in Badakhshan Province, the air force said that the strikes "took out three defensive fighting positions around the camp, degrading the Taliban's ability to conduct training and operations."
- February 8 – A US drone strike on a vehicle in Barmal District, Paktia province, killed four militants.
- February 24 – Taliban militants carried out a pre-dawn assault on a military base in Balabluk district, Farah province, killing 18 soldiers.

=== March ===
- March 9 – An attack in Kabul claimed by ISIS left at least nine civilians dead and 18 civilians wounded. Most, if not all, of the victims were Shia Muslims. Also on that day, 10 soldiers of the Afghan army and six members of the police force were killed by the Taliban in the Takhar province.
- March 16 – A US airstrike killed two ISIL-K facilitators (whom were also the equivalent of platoon leaders in the group) whilst they met in Sar-e Pol Province. Also that day, an Afghan Special Security Forces carried out a nighttime raid on the ISIL-K's headquarters in Jowzjan Province, killing 13 fighters.
- March 26/27 – Afghan and US special operations forces conducting a nighttime raid in the village of Mughul in Jowzjan province, which resulted in the death of an ISIS-K commander and one other terrorist.

=== April ===
- April 5 – A US airstrike in Bal Chiragh district, Faryab province killed a senior ISIS-K commander in Afghanistan, along with his bodyguard.
- April 11 – US and Afghan special operations forces conducted a nighttime raid on in Darzab District, Jowzjan province killed 22 ISIL-K fighters. Also that day, Taliban fighters attacked the district and police headquarters in Khwaja Omari district, Ghazni province, the Taliban used heavy weapons and fighting lasted for three hours, until Afghan reinforcements arrived and the Taliban escaped the area, 14 people were killed.
- April 30 – A US soldier from 3rd Battalion, 509th Infantry Regiment, 4th Infantry Brigade Combat Team, 25th Infantry Division died as a result of enemy small arms fire in the Tagab district, Kapisa Province. Another US service member was wounded.

=== July ===
- July 1 – A suicide bomber kills nineteen people, including 10 Sikhs, at the PD1 market in Jalalabad.
- July 12 – Taliban fighters start to attack ISIL-K in Darzab District of northern Afghanistan in retaliation for the execution of a Taliban commander by the Islamic State. These skirmishes soon escalate, resulting in the Battle of Darzab (2018).

=== August ===
- August 1 – Following heavy fighting with the Taliban, more than 200 ISIL-K fighters in the Darzab District surrendered to the Afghan government, while 128 ISIL-K fighters were captured by the Taliban. Following the mass surrenders, the Taliban took full control of ISIL's former territory in the Darzab District. This event marks the end of the Battle of Darzab (2018).
- August 10 – The Taliban launched a large-scale offensive on the southeastern Afghan city of Ghazni.
- August 15 – A suicide attack targeting an education center in Kabul killed 48 people. The attack took place in a Shia neighbourhood and the responsibility was claimed by ISIS
- August 26 – Unidentified gunmen kill two Tajik border guards, unidentified aircraft respond with airstrike in Darqad District, killing at least six suspected drug smugglers.

=== October ===
- In response to critical levels of internal displacement, caused by what was described as the worst drought in decades, the International Organization for Migration (IOM) monitored internally displaced person (IDP) inflows to the western city of Herat, but had to discontinue three monitoring points due to opportunistic IDPs arriving in overwhelming numbers and attempting to take advantage of presumed distributions. During the September–October period, IOM enumerated over 17,000 IDPs across all monitoring points.
- October 18 - Kandahar Province police chief of Abdul Raziq Achakzai was killed in a Taliban shooting attack following a meeting with the top U.S. and NATO commander, and two Americans were wounded. The attack at the Kandahar Palace did not wound U.S. Army General Scott Miller, but also killed the provincial head of the National Directorate of Security.

=== November ===
- Three U.S. troops are killed and three others are wounded in an IED blast near Ghazni, Afghanistan. (BBC)
- The U.S. considered asking Afghanistan to suspend its April 2019 presidential elections while pursuing peace talks with the Taliban.(Wall Street Journal) Later, former Afghan National Security Adviser Mohammad Hanif Atmar announced his candidacy, indicating he firmly believes a peace deal with the Taliban is possible. (The Diplomat)
- A bombing in an Afghan army mosque killed at least 27 troops in southeastern Khost Province, while dozens more were wounded. Days earlier, 55 young Islamic scholars and clerics were killed by a suicide bomber in a hotel in Kabul while marking the prophet Muhammad's birth. This was the first recorded incident of attacking a mosque on an army base, and ISIS later claimed responsibility.(Washington Post) (Reuters)
- November 27 – A U.S. airstrike on a compound in Garmsir District, Helmand Province during a joint operation between Afghan and U.S. forces killed as many as 23 civilians, with most victims women and children, the UN says.
- November 28– Afghan President Ashraf Ghani formed a 12-member team to hold peace talks with the Taliban while attending a two-day international peace conference in Geneva.
- The U.S. dropped more bombs and other munitions over ten months than in any other full year since documentation began, new Air Force data shows.

=== December ===
- Afghanistan overtook Iraq to become the world's deadliest country for terrorism—one-quarter of all worldwide terrorism-related deaths during 2017 occurred there.
- December 1 – A U.S. airstrike in Nawzad District, Helmand Province killed Mullah Abdul Mannan Akhoond, the Taliban's "governor" and military chief for southern Helmand.
- December 3 – Zalmay Khalilzad, in charge of U.S. peace efforts in Afghanistan, left for an eight-country tour to discuss negotiating with the Taliban—he will travel to Afghanistan, Pakistan, Russia and the United Arab Emirates, and has already spoken multiple times with senior Taliban officials by their account.
- December 6 – The Taliban staged a coordinated attack overnight on two Afghan army outposts in western Herat Province, killing 14 Afghan soldiers.
- December 18 – Despite objections from his military advisors, Donald Trump ordered the U.S. military to withdraw about half the troops in Afghanistan. It could take months to withdraw the nearly 7,000 troops.
- December 24 – More than 40 people died in a bombing and attack at a government building in Kabul; most were government employees. No group claimed responsibility.
- December 28 – A report issued by UNICEF revealed that during the first nine months of 2018, five thousand children were killed or injured in Afghanistan. Manuel Fontaine, UNICEF Director of Emergency Programs, said the world has forgotten children living in conflict zones.
- December 30 – Officials announced the presidential elections scheduled for April 2019 will be delayed three months (until July 2019), to ensure better organized polls but also due to ongoing efforts at peace negotiations with the Taliban.
- December 31 – Three simultaneous nighttime assaults on oil wells by Taliban near the capital of Sar-e Pol Province killed at least 21 Afghan police officers; the Afghan army responded by firing artillery into the capital's outskirts, which caused civilians to flee.

== Deaths ==
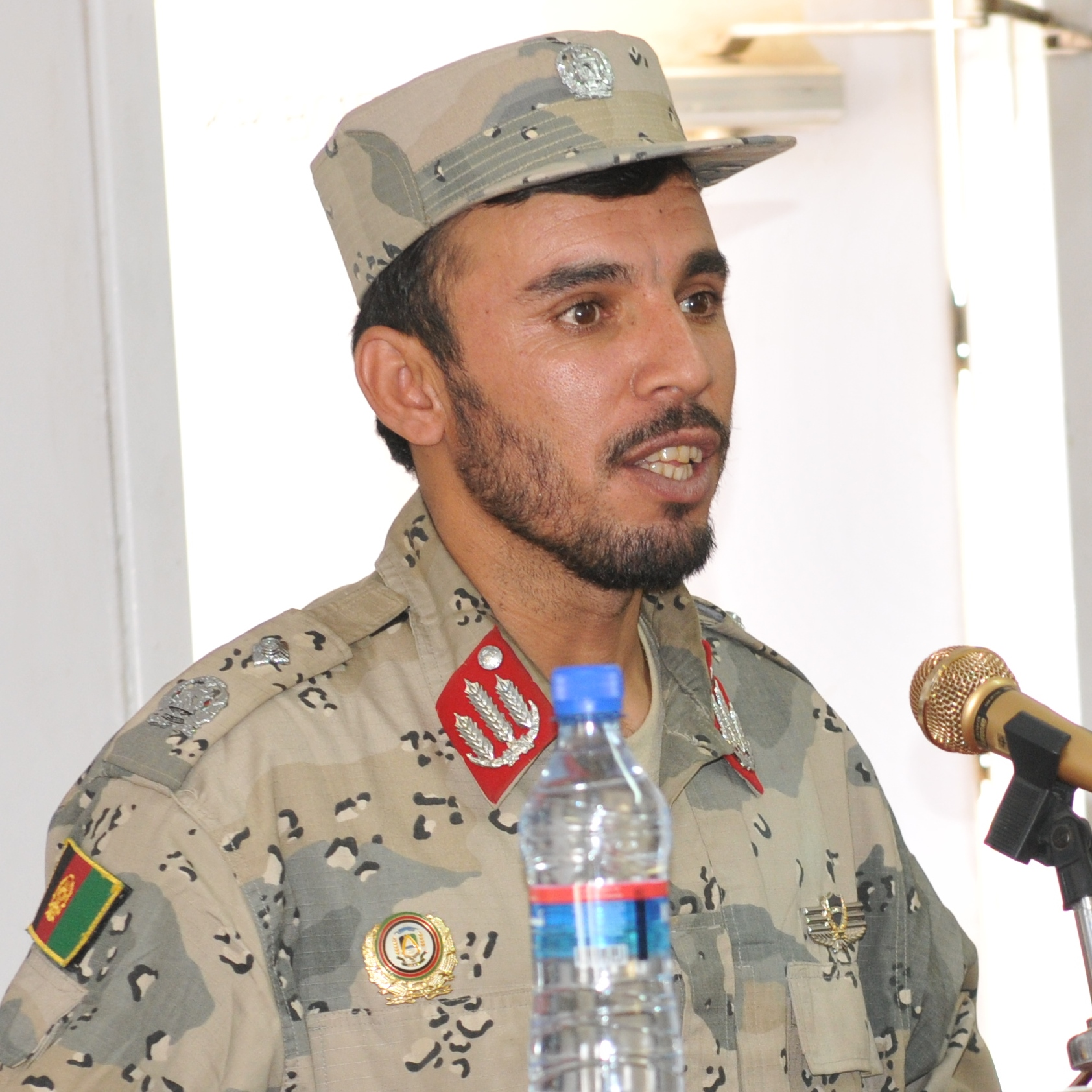
Abdul Raziq Achakzai

- April 30 – Shah Marai, journalist and photographer
- September 2 - Shoaib Moradef, major, commando, in a military airplane accident in northern Afghanistan (b. 1985).
- September 3 – Jalaluddin Haqqani, militant, founder of the Haqqani network (b. 1939).
- September 5 - Samim Faramarz, television reporter, killed live on air along with cameraman Ramiz Ahmadi while covering a suicide bombing (b. 1990).
- October 17 - Abdul Jabar Qahraman, former DRA era general, assassinated by the Taliban while running in parliamentary elections.
- October 18 - Abdul Raziq Achakzai, brigadier general, assassinated by the Taliban while meeting with American counterparts (b. 1979).
