= Kambakhsh =

Kambakhsh is a surname that may refer to:

- Muhammad Kam Bakhsh (1667–1709), youngest son of the sixth Mughal emperor Aurangzeb
- Abdossamad Kambakhsh (1902 or 1903–1971), also known as the Red Prince, Iranian communist and political activist who was the son of a Qajar prince
- Sayed Pervez Kambaksh (born 1984), Afghan journalist who was sentenced to death for blasphemy in 2008 but received amnesty in 2009
