= Human rights in Afghanistan =

Human rights in Afghanistan under the Taliban regime are severely restricted and considered among the worst in the world. According to a 2024 report by Freedom House, Political Freedom is rated a 1 out of 40 with Civil Liberties at 5 out of 60, with the overall score of 6 out of 100 due to various factors including but not limited to: women's rights, LGBTQ+ rights, ethnic minority rights, torture, and freedom of speech. Women's rights and freedom are severely restricted, as they are banned from most public spaces and employment. Afghanistan is the only country in the world to ban education for women over the age of eleven. The Taliban's policies towards women are categorized as a gender apartheid. Minority groups such as Hazaras, Uzbek, Turkmen, and Tajik face persecution and eviction from their lands.

The Taliban restricts the rights of particular minority groups to remain as close to their extremist interpretation of Islamist Law. These patriarchal norms are meant to uphold a controlling environment in public and private life as well as solidify the Talibans control. Authorities have used physical violence, raids, arbitrary arrests and detention, torture, enforced disappearances of activists and political opponents. The media is tightly controlled with almost no freedom, with intrusive and strict monitoring in play. The strict media control is primarily used to further their interpretation of Islamic law as well as make sure that they stifle criticism or any dissent against their government. By doing so, the Taliban faithfully eliminates any narrative that may oppose their regime or promote different ideologies, monopolizing information.

== History ==
Under the monarchy of Zahir Shah, human rights were usually respected. As of 1949, the Afghan Prime Minister Shah Mahmud Khan, increased press freedom, but these moves were soon reversed. The Press Law which was implemented in July 1965, gave considerable freedom to the press for the first time. While the press was mostly free, in some cases the King closed down media from dissidents that were considered threatening. The communist Khalq republic that governed Afghanistan after the Saur Revolution in 1978 was brutal, vigorously suppressing opposition. The government abducted and executed thousands of prisoners as well as rural civilian dissidents.

In April 1987, Afghanistan ratified the United Nations Convention against Torture (CAT), which prevents the state from inflicting torture on any individual. New leader Babrak Karmal promised to end the Khalq's brutality, which it partly did, but human rights abuses still continued. The government along with the Soviets (during the Soviet–Afghan War) intentionally targeted civilian settlements in rural areas. Under President Mohammad Najibullah's reforms, freedom of expression was further improved but human rights overall remained restricted.

In the 1990s, many atrocities were committed by various militias against civilians. Indiscriminate rocket attacks during the Battle of Kabul, especially those by Gulbuddin Hekmatyar's militia, killed thousands of civilians. The Taliban, in power from 1996, imposed strong restrictions on women, performed public executions, and prevented international aid from entering the country for starving civilians.

The presidential government of the Islamic Republic of Afghanistan, which previously ruled Afghanistan, from 2004 until the Taliban overthrew it in 2021, had a strong human rights framework in its constitution. A bill of rights was enshrined in chapter two of the 2004 Constitution of Afghanistan. The right to life and liberty were constitutionally protected, as were the right to a fair trial and the presumption of innocence for all persons. That gave the Islamic Republic a strong human rights framework that was guaranteed to all citizens.

== Contemporary human rights issues ==
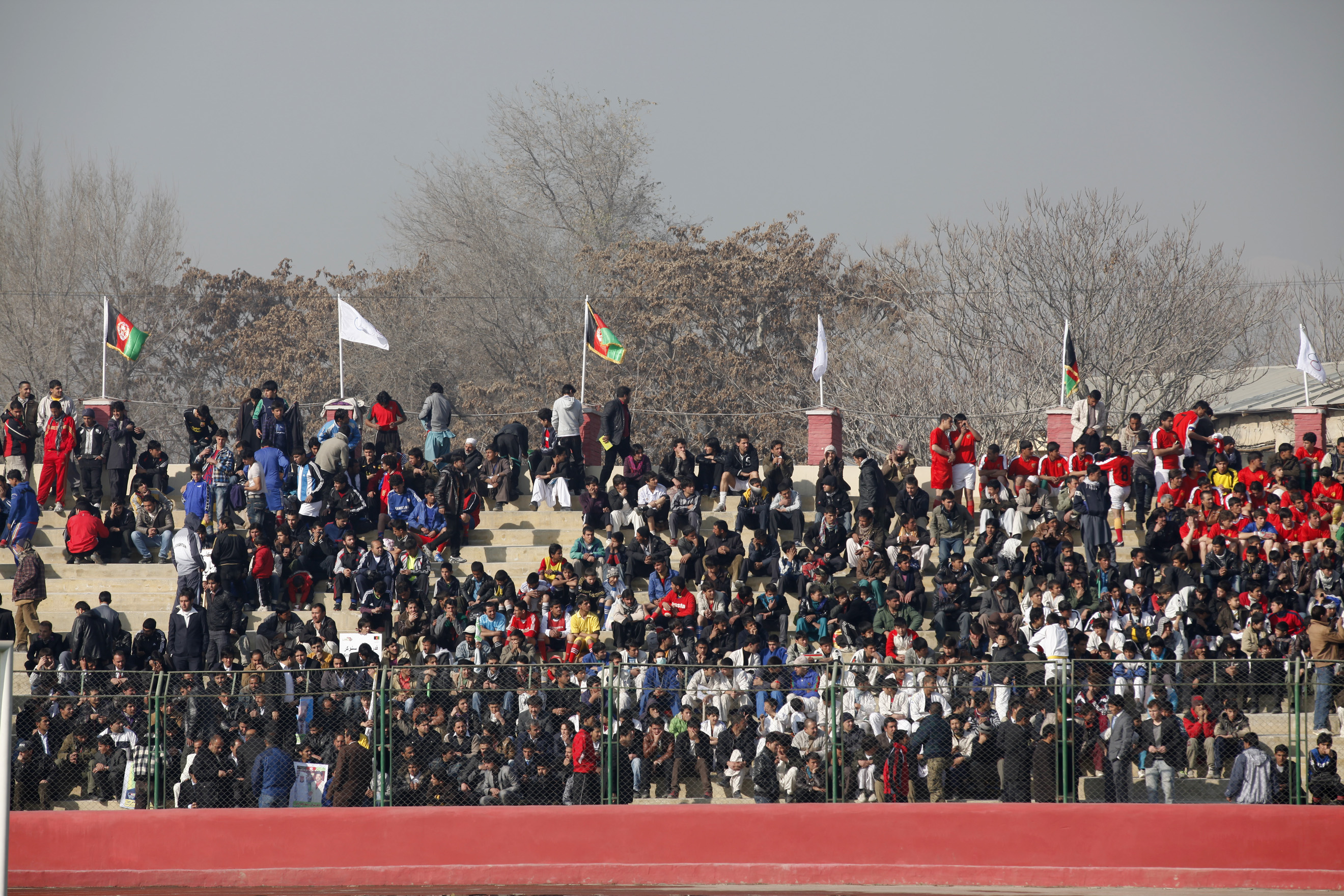
Football fans inside the Ghazi Stadium in the capital of Kabul, which is multi-ethnic and the largest city of Afghanistan.

The Bonn Agreement of 2001 established the Afghan Independent Human Rights Commission (AIHRC) as a national human rights institution to protect and promote human rights and to investigate human rights abuses and war crimes. The Afghanistan Constitution of 2004 entrenched the existence of the AIHRC. While the ongoing turmoil, violence and reconstruction efforts often make it difficult to get an accurate sense of what is going on. Reports from NGOs have accused various branches of the Afghan government of engaging in human rights violations. There has been a noticeable shift in recent years, with more information coming to light regarding the abuse of minority groups due to this extremist regime; organizations like Hagar USA are dedicated to spreading information on the dangers of life in Afghanistan with the goal of helping its people. With statistics that claim that 86% of people in Afghanistan are at-risk of human trafficking or slavery, 9/10 Afghan people are living below the poverty line and 30% of girls who are under 18 are married. By publishing this information, they hope to encourage people to learn more about the countries suffering population and join them on their mission to help.

Additionally, a lot of organizations and American media face constant backlash and criticism when discussing the topic because of reports of American soldiers abusing and harming Afghan civilians. During the war that ranged from 2001-2021 where millions of American soldiers were deployed in Afghanistan there were several reports made documenting the psychological and physical abuse endured by citizens in detention facilities as well as blatant use of excessive force on civilians. There have also been various human rights abuses by American soldiers on Afghan civilians, most notably in the Baghram prisons where innocent civilians endured torture, humiliating conditions, and inhumane treatment. The United States was heavily criticized for lenient sentencing for the soldiers responsible. Former Afghan warlords and political strongmen supported by the US during the ousting of the Taliban were responsible for numerous human rights violations in 2003 including kidnapping, rape, robbery, and extortion.

Some members of the Afghan National Security Forces were involved in killing civilians in ground operations as well as in air strikes.

=== Torture agreement ===
In March 2002, ABC News claimed top officials at the CIA authorized controversial, harsh interrogation techniques. The possible interrogation techniques included shaking and slapping, shackling prisoners in a standing position, keeping the prisoner in a cold cell and dousing them with water, and water boarding. A United Nations study in 2011 reported on interviews with 379 detainees. It found those held by police or intelligence services were subjected to beatings, removal of toenails and electric shocks.

== Justice system ==
Afghanistan has two dominant justice systems: the formal state system and the informal traditional system. Despite the existence of ordinary judicial system e.g. Supreme Court, National Security Court (dealing with terrorism-related cases), first and second instance courts, "jirga" and "shura"-traditional institutions are operating.

Under the Taliban regime in Afghanistan, the justice system has been marked by strict interpretations of Islamic law. In April 2025, Taliban leader Hibatullah Akhundzada defended executions, stating they were an integral part of Islam. This statement followed the execution of four men convicted of murder, which took place in sports stadiums; the largest such mass execution since the Taliban regained power in 2021. The Supreme Court of Afghanistan upheld the death sentence after victims' families refused to grant amnesty. The executions were widely condemned by human rights organizations and the United Nations. Akhundzada emphasized the importance of implementing all divine commands and rejected Western legal frameworks, reinforcing the Taliban's focus on enforcing Islamic law.

== Law and order ==
Some members of Afghanistan's National Directorate of Security (NDS) have been accused of running their own prisons, torturing suspects, and harassing journalists. They have also been accused of deliberately killing civilians during government raids.

The security forces of local militias, which also have their own prisons, have been accused of torture and arbitrary killings. Warlords in the north have used property destruction, rape, and murder to discourage displaced Pashtuns from reclaiming their homes. Child labor and human trafficking remain common outside Kabul. Civilians have been killed frequently in battles between warlord forces. Poor conditions in overcrowded prisons have contributed to illness and death among prisoners. To stop it, a prison rehabilitation program had begun in 2003.

In the absence of an effective national judicial system, the right to judicial protection has been compromised as uneven local standards have prevailed in criminal trials. Fair trial principles are enshrined in the Afghan constitution and the criminal procedure but frequently violated for various reasons, including the lack of well-educated, professional staff (especially defence lawyers), lack of material resources, corruption and unlawful interference by warlords and politicians. Several thousands of people in Afghanistan have been victims of enforced disappearance over the past four decades.

On 27 June 2020, two human rights defenders associated with Afghanistan Independent Human Rights Commission (AIHRC) were killed in a bomb attack. They died after an explosive device attached to their vehicle detonated. The attack came less than a week after two prosecutors and three other employees from the attorney general's office were shot dead by gunmen in Kabul.

On August 14, 2020, the United Nations experts demanded the Afghanistan government take an early decisive action to prevent the killing of human rights defenders. Nine human rights defenders have been killed since the start of 2020. The number has already surpassed 2019's figure.

Since 2021, when the Taliban established the Islamic Emirate of Afghanistan, 100 former government officials and affiliates have been killed. Human rights activists, civil rights activists and media workers are under "constant attack" (threats and intimidation) under this new government.

== Freedom of speech and the media ==
Article 34 of the Afghan Constitution allows freedom of speech and press, though there are restrictions on media that may invoke Islamic law or be offensive to other sects. However, there has been harassment and threats targeting journalists and legal experts, especially outside Kabul. Freedom of the press was guaranteed by interim President Hamid Karzai in February 2002. The 2004 Media Law was signed by Karzai in 2005. In 2008, documentary filmmaker Nasir Fayaz was arrested for criticising politicians from the President's cabinet on his weekly show on Ariana TV. The arrest caused an outcry from journalists and it violated Article 34 which reads "Freedom of expression shall be inviolable". Afghanistan ranks 122nd in the 2020 dropping by 2 points from 120th rank in 2017 according to Press Freedom Index. But still, it stands in a better position than all its neighbors.

Journalists in Afghanistan face threats from both the security forces and insurgents. Journalists are threatened, assaulted and killed by Afghan officials, warlords and insurgents to stop them from reporting. Furthermore, Human Rights Watch report claims that many Afghan journalists self-censor by steering clear of reporting on sensitive issues. Afghan Journalists Safety Committee (AJSC) in 2017 claim that Afghan government accounted for 46% of the attacks on Afghans journalist. While insurgents were responsible for the rest of the attacks.

== Religious freedom ==
No registration of religious groups is required; minority religious groups are able to freely practice their religions but they are not allowed to proselytize them. Islam is the official religion; all laws must be compatible with Islamic morality, and the President and Vice President must both be Muslims. Officially, Apostasy remains punishable by death, per the Constitution of Afghanistan. In 2006, Abdul Rahman, an Afghan Muslim who had been arrested for converting to Christianity, was granted presidential permission to leave the country, and he moved to Italy, where he was granted asylum. In 2014, an Afghan Muslim who had renounced Islam and had become an atheist was granted asylum in the United Kingdom, on the grounds that he could face death if he returned to his country of origin. In 2022, Freedom House rated Afghanistan's religious freedom as 1 out of 4.

== Women's rights ==
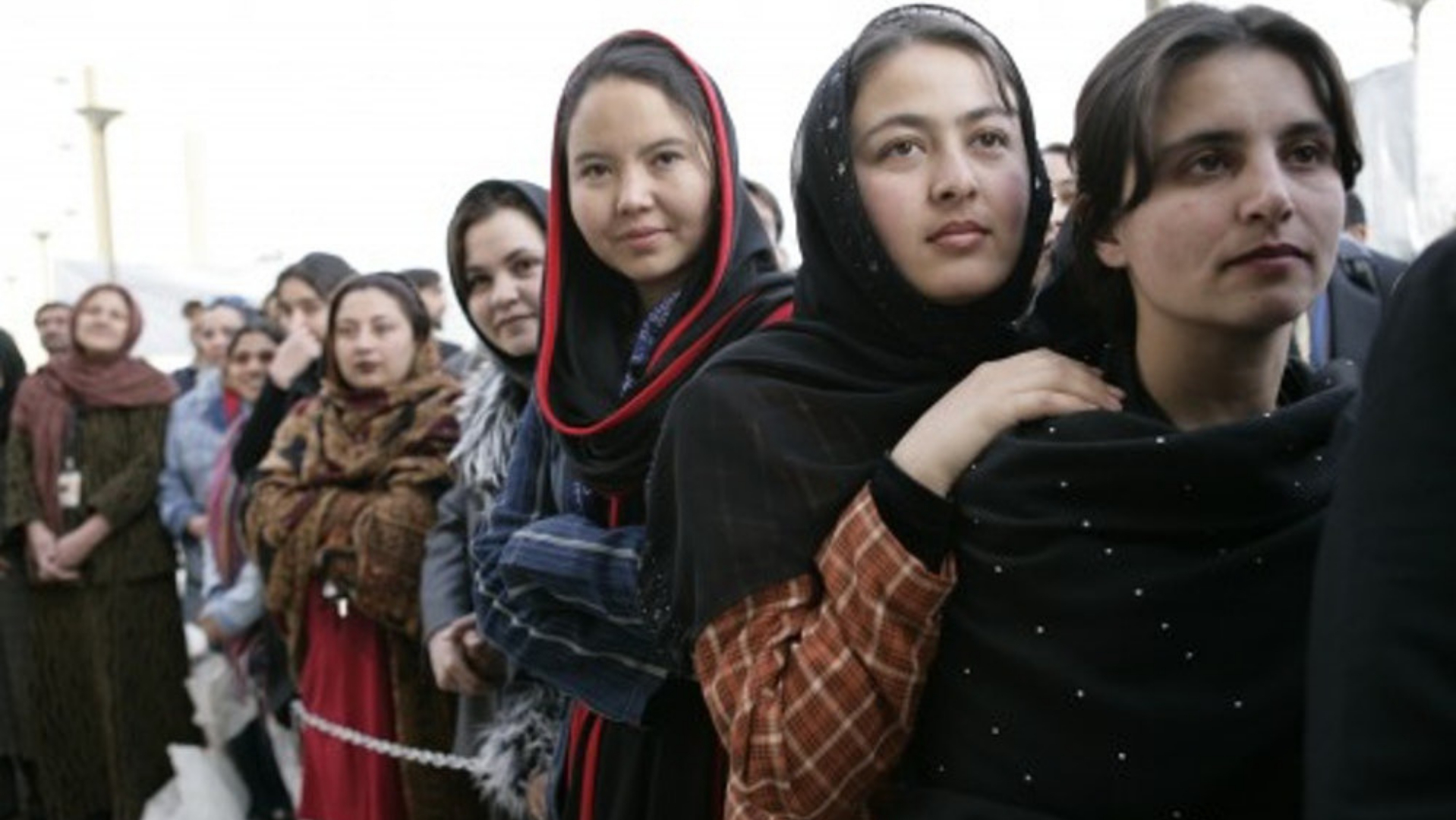
Women had equal rights to men under the 2004 Constitution of Afghanistan

The 2004 Constitution of Afghanistan promised equal rights for men and women, including women being permitted to work outside the home, to engage in political activity, and a requirement for each political party to nominate a certain number of female candidates.

During the first period of Taliban rule, women had virtually all their rights taken away. Matters ranging from wearing nail polish to job opportunities were severely restricted. By keeping women indoors, the Taliban claimed to be keeping them safe from harm.

In late March 2009, Afghan President Hamid Karzai signed into law an internationally condemned "Shia Family Law" which condones apparent spousal rape (in Article 132), child marriage and imposes purdah on married Afghan women. Although the offending legislation is said to have been dormant for a year, President Karzai was trying to gain the support of Afghan northern Shia legislators and the neighbouring Islamic Republic of Iran, which is Shia-dominated. According to Britain's Independent newspaper, the 'family code' was not read in the Upper House/Senate, and also enshrines gender discrimination in inheritance law and divorce against women.

Despite various promises from the government to implement United Nations Security Council Resolution 1325, the law could not be implemented. The Kabul peace talks that took place in June 2017, included only two women among 47 government and international representatives.

On 18 September 2020, President Ashraf Ghani signed a new law to include mothers' names on their children's birth certificates and identification cards. Afghan women's rights activists had been campaigning on social media for several years to include the name of both parents, under the hashtag #WhereIsMyName.

In May 2022, the Taliban's Ministry for the Propagation of Virtue and the Prevention of Vice published a decree requiring all women in Afghanistan to wear full-body coverings when in public (either a burqa or an abaya paired with a niqāb, which leaves only the eyes uncovered).

In August 2024, the Taliban codified the 2022 Taliban decree by publishing the Law on the Promotion of Virtue and the Prevention of Vice through de facto authorities within the Afghan government. The law affirms previously stated ideals and enforcements of female modesty; such as requiring women to don full body-coverings like a burqa or an abaya paired with a niqāb. It also expands on the seclusion and suppression of women by instituting that women cannot speak to men outside of close family. This law does not only affect direct speech, but prohibits women from speaking too loudly and singing to avoid the risk of a man overhearing them. Women are also barred from looking at men outside of their families. The Law on the Promotion of Virtue and the Prevention of Vice not only furthers the suppression of women, but empowers the position of men as "enforcers" of morality. The Law on the Promotion of Virtue and the Prevention of Vice explicitly outlines an enforcer as any adult Islamic man with a self-prescribed moral compass.

On 23 January 2025, International Criminal Court issued two warrants against the Taliban supreme leader Haibatullah Akhundzada and the Chief judge, Abdul Hakim Haqqani, for committing the crimes against humanity with the oppression and persecution of Afghan women and girls, who have been deprived of the freedom of movement, the rights to control their bodies, to education, and to a private and family life, whereas the alleged resistance and opposition are brutally suppressed with murder, imprisonment, torture, rape, and other forms of sexual violence, since 2021. ICC member states are obliged to arrest wanted persons if they are on their territory.

== Sexual orientation ==
Same-sex intimacy is currently illegal in Afghanistan. According to the 2017 Afghan Penal Code, same-sex activity is subject to a maximum sentence of two years in prison, depending on the perceived extent of sexual activity. Section 647 of the Penal Code states that women participating in Musahaqah, same-sex intercourse between females, are subject to a maximum of one year in prison. Section 649 affects male same-sex intercourse called Tafkhiz, which is intercourse that doesn't include penetration. Individuals caught participating in Tafkhiz can be jailed anywhere from three months to a year. Under Penal Code Section 646 regarding sodomy, sodomy charges are not limited to LGBTQ+ individuals and affect heterosexuals as well. Any individual caught participating in anal penetration can be charged up to two years in prison. Section 646 also extends to pedophilia, which is the only offense outside of sodomy included in this section.

While the law explicitly outlines prison sentences, it does not address the social stigma and treatment of LGBTQ+ people in Afghanistan under Taliban rule. Since the 2021 Taliban Offensive, violent crimes against LGBTQ+ people have increased. If a person is caught or suspected of same-sex desire or intercourse, there is a possibility of being assaulted and possibly killed by police before their trial. In October 2024, nine individuals were publicly flogged for sexual deviance before their trial. A few months prior in June 2024, 63 people were publicly flogged by the Taliban for "immoral activities" including same-sex intercourse and adultery.

== Persecution of minority groups ==
Hazaras are one of the ethnic groups in Afghanistan. After the takeover by Taliban, many Hazaras were forcibly evicted from their homes. A report by Amnesty International reported that the Taliban were prosecuting, torturing and unlawfully killing Hazaras. When the Taliban returned to power in 2021, journalists and international organizations documented an increase of targeted attacks and discrimination against these communities. Attacks by extremist groups such as the Islamic State Khorasan Province have largely affected the Hazara civilians and human rights organizations report that this abuse is usually carried out with impunity, making the situation especially concerning the ethnic persecution.

== Humanitarian aid ==
With the knowledge from journalists as well as social media content and general information, there is a growing concern about the treatment that millions of civilians are facing in Afghanistan. The lack of human rights and treatment of women and the LGBTQ+ community have been particularly popular in global media and several groups have formed to offer aid. OCHA has labeled it one of the worlds largest humanitarian crises in 2026. Unfortunately while this has become a global issue with significant media coverage, food insecurity and lack of access to healthcare as well as widespread unemployment continue to affect large portions of the population, especially those residing in rural areas.

The Afghanistan Humanitarian Fund was set up in 2014 by OCHA to help the nation face their issues, yet the country is still facing severe issues.

== Slavery ==
Slavery in Afghanistan was first documented as an accepted practice in the post-Classical history of Afghanistan, continuing during the Middle Ages and after, until being banned by the Emirate of Afghanistan in 1923, though persisting after then in illegal forms. State sanctioned practices akin to slavery of women and girls are widely documented, without being officially designated as such. The origin of the enslaved people in Afghanistan shifted during different periods, and slaves in Afghanistan never had any particular ethnicity. An illegal form of sexual slavery of young boys called bacha bāzī continues into the present day and is sometimes perpetrated by Taliban members, despite being condemned and prohibited by Taliban leadership.

== Post-2021 Taliban Rule ==
Although the Taliban was ousted in December of 2001 following the 9/11 attacks, a U.S invasion forced the group to leave power and retreat in Pakistan and parts of rural Afghanistan. Since their return in 2021, human rights have suffered and deteriorated. Women's rights have suffered greatly due to the Talibans extreme restrictions on their education, employment and general exclusion from public life. In a global perspective, it is exceptionally hard to shine a light on the issue because journalists and news organizations are massively censored as well as intimidating writers. There have been an increasing number if attacks on ethnic and religious minorities with a keen focus on the Hazara community. Upon these developments have raised several concerns throughout international organizations that dedicate their operations to systemic human rights violations.

== See also ==
- Crime in Afghanistan
- 2007 Shinwar shooting
- Revolutionary Association of the Women of Afghanistan
- Sayed Pervez Kambaksh
- Freedom of religion in Afghanistan
- Anti-Afghan sentiment
- Abdul Samad Amiri, Afghan human rights activist killed by the Taliban in 2019
- Arrest of Barbie and Peter Reynolds
