= 2019 Kohistan mine collapse =

On 6 January 2019, it was reported that a mine shaft in the Kohistan District of Badakhshan Province, Afghanistan had collapsed, killing 30 people. The makeshift shaft was reportedly being used to mine gold. Afghan government sources noted that the mining operation was unregulated and illegal, and that most of the miners were local villagers trying to supplement their incomes through rudimentary gold mining. It was reported that at least 7 other people were injured. It was also reported that locals managed to only rescue 13 people while many others including children died.
