= Citadel of Ghazni =

Medieval fortress in Afghanistan

- Ghazni in Afghanistan
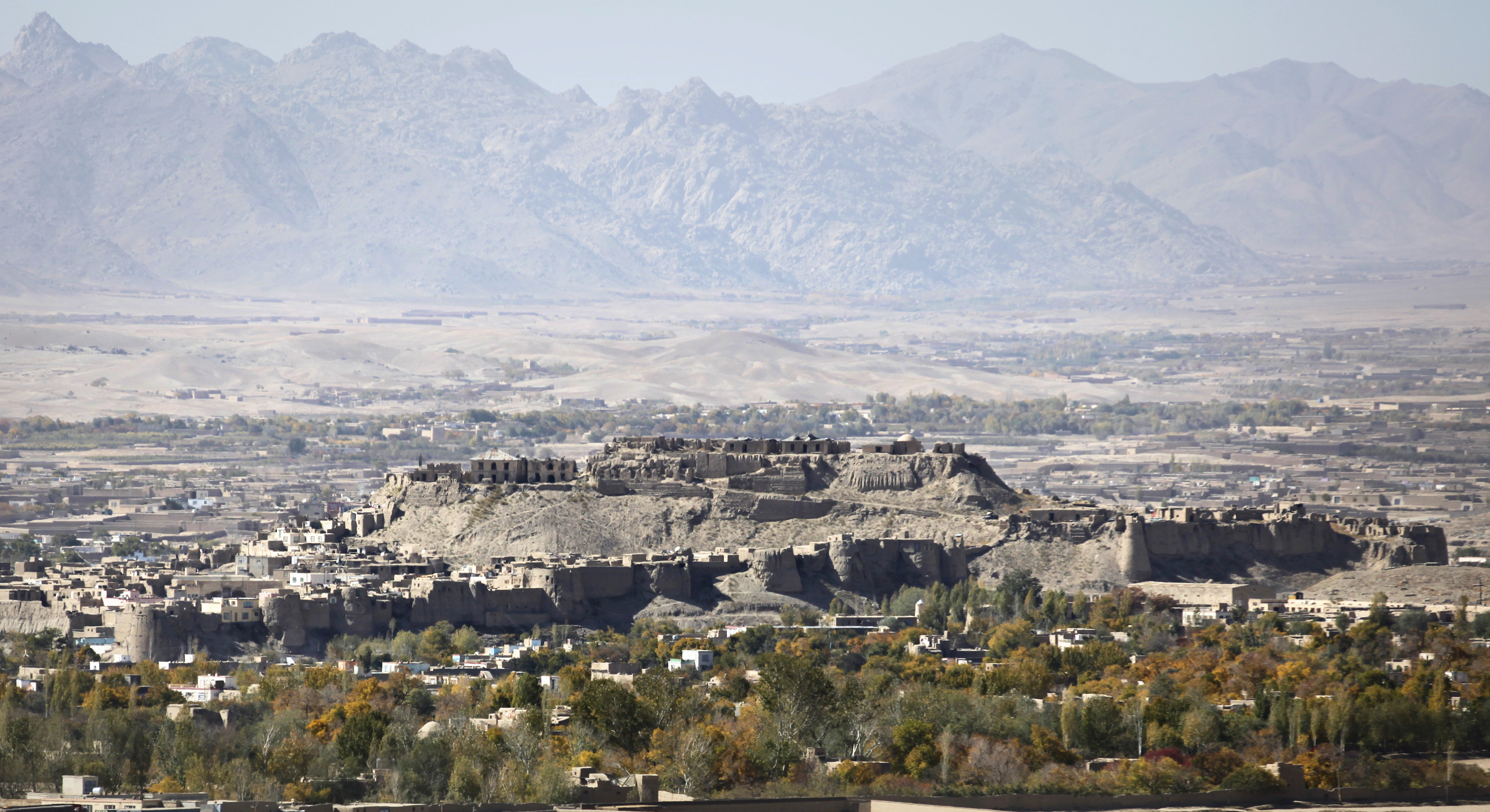
- View of Ghazni Citadel

Site information
- Open to the public: Yes
- Condition: Partially ruined

Location
- Location in Afghanistan
- Coordinates: 33°32′57″N 68°25′24″E
- Height: 45 metres (147 foot)

Site history
- Built: 13th century
- Battles/wars: Battle of Ghazni

The Citadel of Ghazni (or Ghuznee, Ghazna) is a large medieval fortress located in Ghazni city, east-central Afghanistan. It was built in the 13th century surrounding the Ghazni town to form a walled city. The 50 metre (150 foot) high citadel dominates the skyline.

The citadel is at risk of destruction due to multiple threats. Already more than half of the citadel's 32 original towers have been destroyed or heavily damaged with the collapse of one tower being caught on video in June, 2019 and being shared widely on social media. The citadel is located in the center of the city and near major roads. A lack of funds to preserve the site, heavy rains, and the country's ongoing internal and external conflicts have further contributed to the citadel's collapse.

Built in order to defend the city of Ghazni, which served as the capital of the Ghaznavid Empire and where the Sultan resided, from threats of invaders such as the Ghurid Empire, which started a century prior and its expansion deemed a great threat to the power and land the Ghaznavids attained.

== History ==
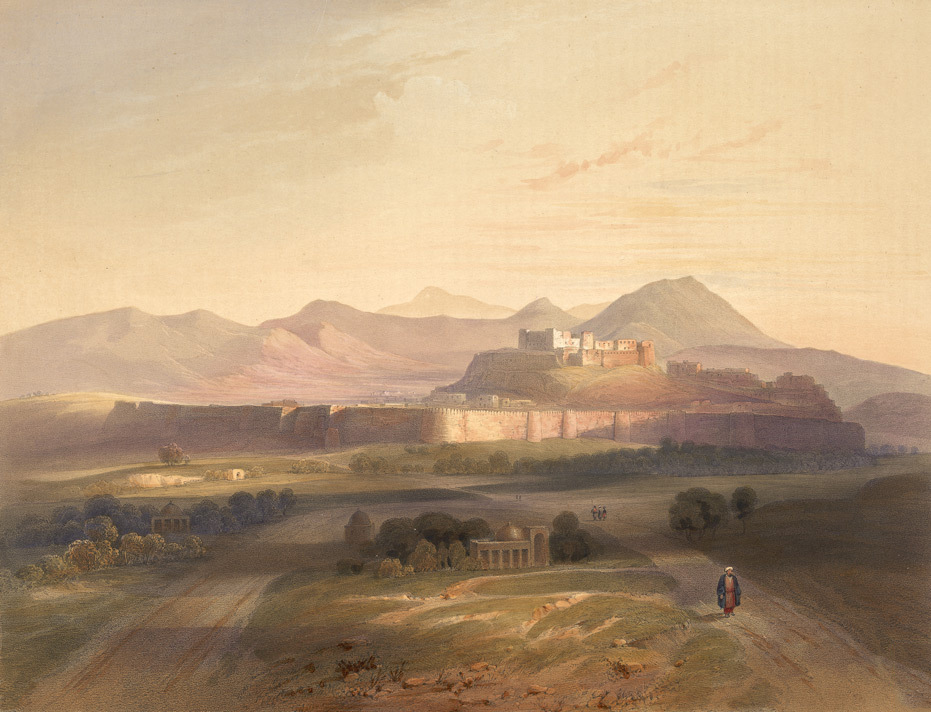
Painting by James Rattray shows town and Citadel of Ghazni, 1839-1842

In 962, the Turkic slave commander of the Samanid Empire, Alp-Tegin, attacked Ghazni and besieged the citadel for four months. He wrested Ghazni from the Lawik ruler, Abu Bakr Lawik. Alp-Tegin was accompanied by Sabuktigin during this conquest.

In 1839, the citadel was the site of the battle of Ghazni during the first Anglo-Afghan War when the British troops stormed and captured the citadel. It saw further violence during later decades of wars.

On 14 June 2019, a tower collapsed due to heavy rain and possible government negligence.

== Ghazni ==
Ghazni is a city located in modern-day Afghanistan. Once a prominent Buddhist community, by the 7th century it saw a course of army invasions that brought Islam to the region. Ghazni served as the capital of the Ghaznavid Empire, where the Sultan resided. Today, the city reflects more locality, being more politically dependent on the regions around it.

== Structure ==
The main palace stands at 150 feet (45 meters) high and encircled by a fortification. The Citadel encapsulates the palace of the ruler as well as the core of the city of Ghazni. The brick structure consists of a sprawled, multi-layer fortress with a defensive brick border to defend itself against potential foreign invaders. The brick is most likely derived from Indian spolia due to the Ghaznavid's military campaigns and consistent trade with India. There were four gates of entry that connected to the many markets within.

The Citadel provided a multitude of services. Not only was there a palace for the residing Sultan, but the Citadel contained sprawling markets, suburban homes, administrative/military quarters, and served as a communal gathering place for the general population.

== Threats ==
Over time, the architecture of the Citadel of Ghazni has become increasingly in disrepair due to damaging natural events such as heavy rain and lack of repair funds from the government.

Many of the towers and walls of the fortress are crumbling. Decades of war and continued political instability in Afghanistan have contributed to the deterioration of the fortress. War and lack of funds have hampered restoration efforts.

In June, 2019 one of the fort's 32 original towers collapsed and was caught on video and posted to social media sparking international calls for the Afghan government and international community to do more to preserve the country's cultural heritage.

== Gallery ==
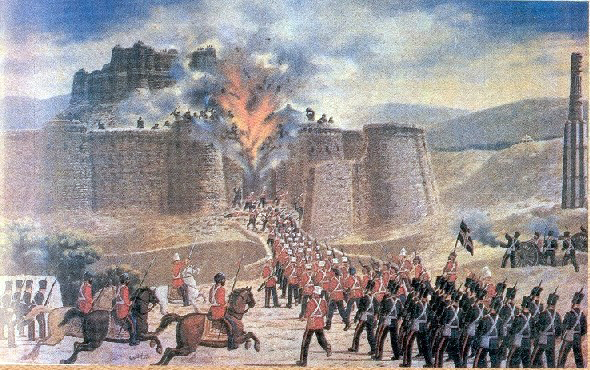
British-Indian troops attacking the citadel during the First Afghan War, 1839.

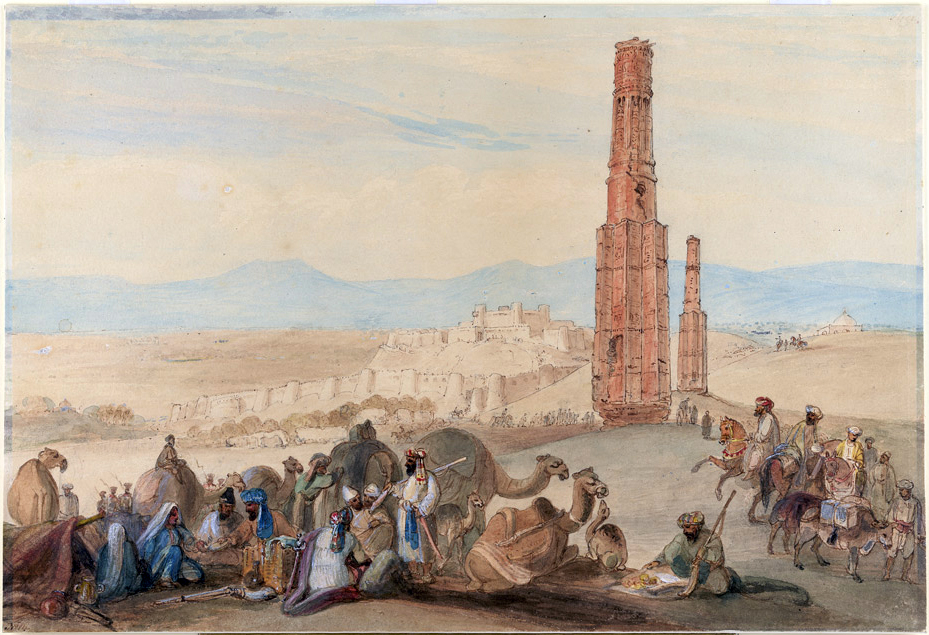
Painting by James Atkinson with Ghazni fort in the background of the Ghazni Minarets, 1839.

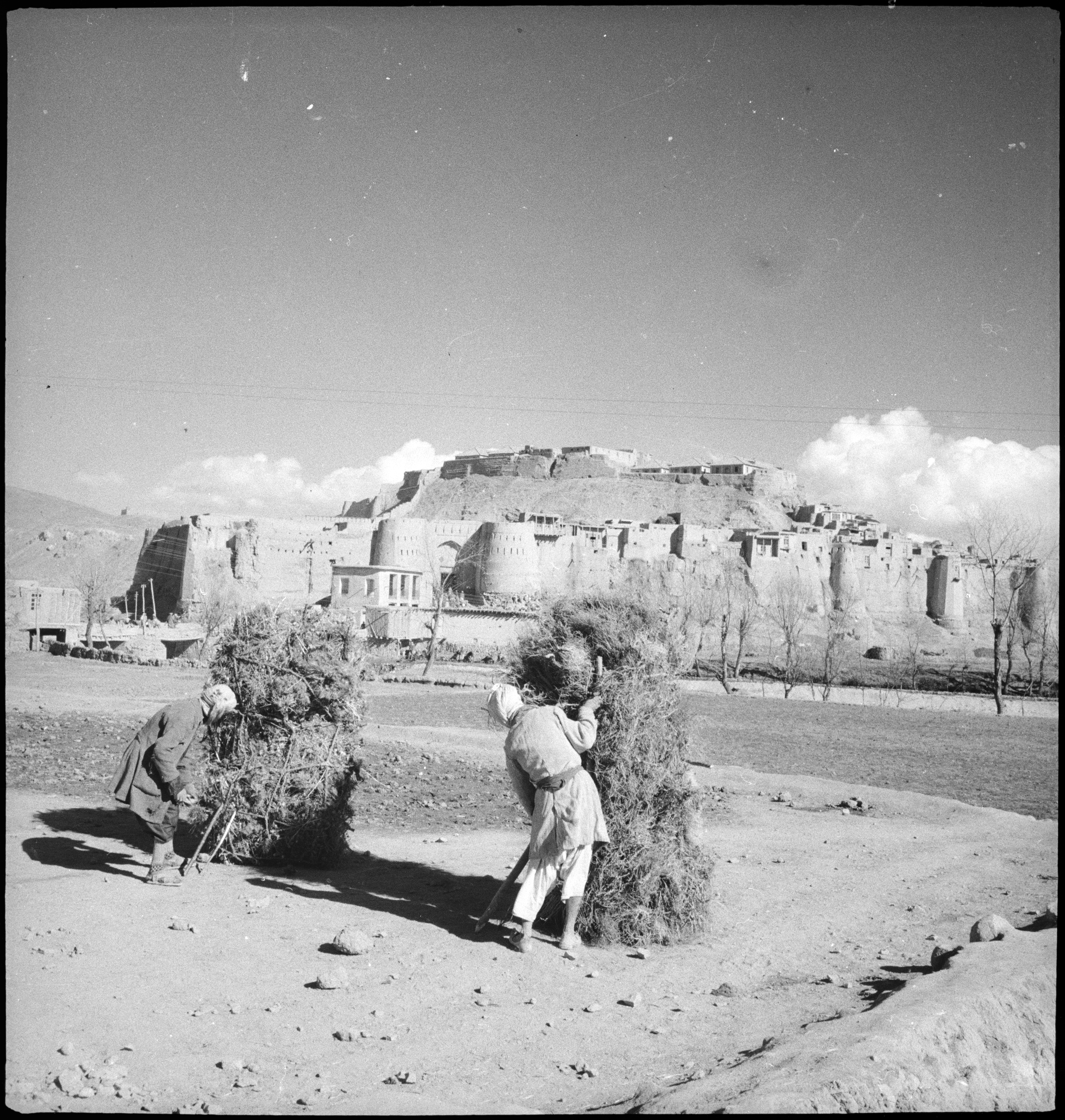
Citadel of Ghazni in 1939

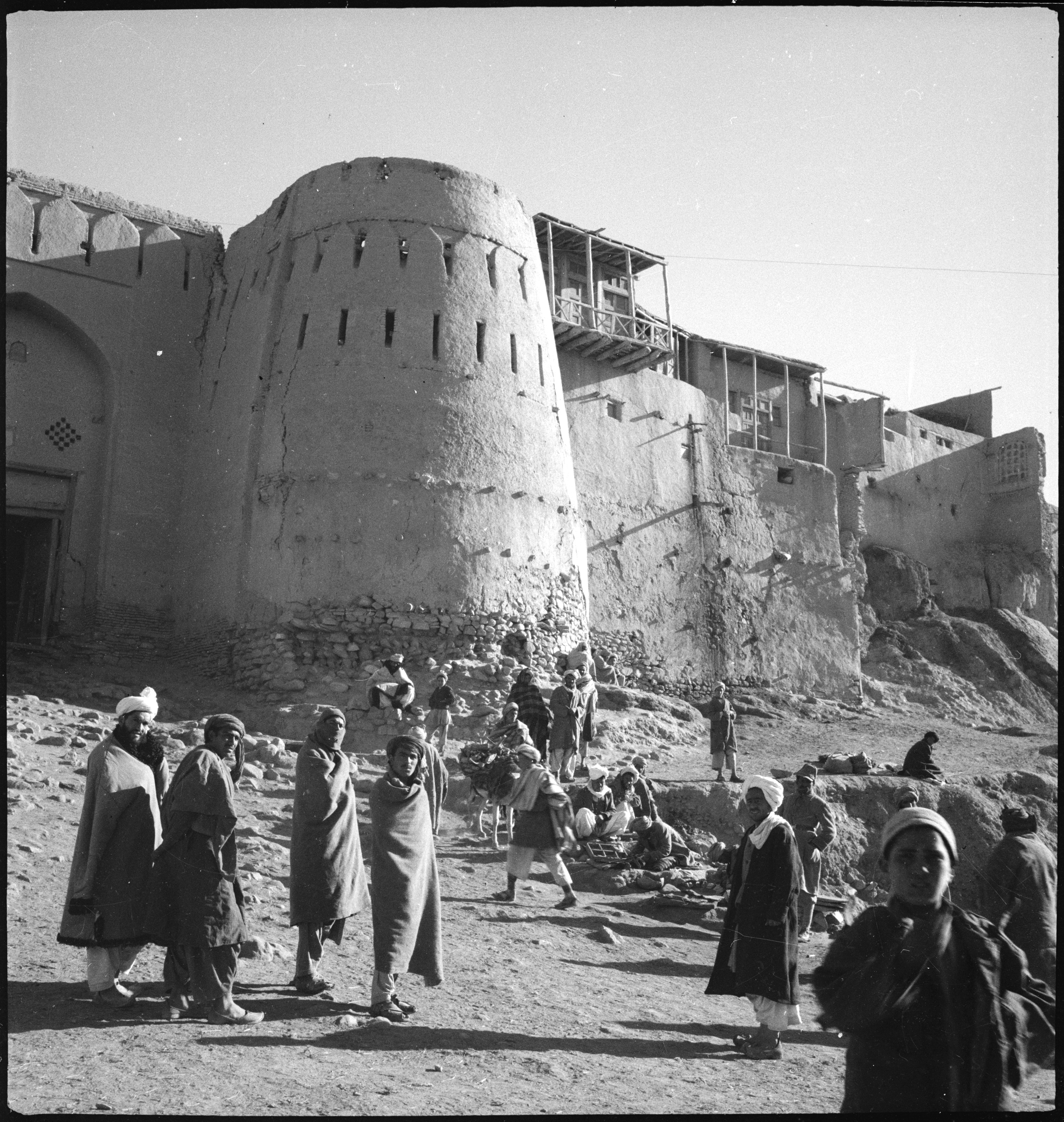
Wall of Ghazni Citadel, 1939–1940.

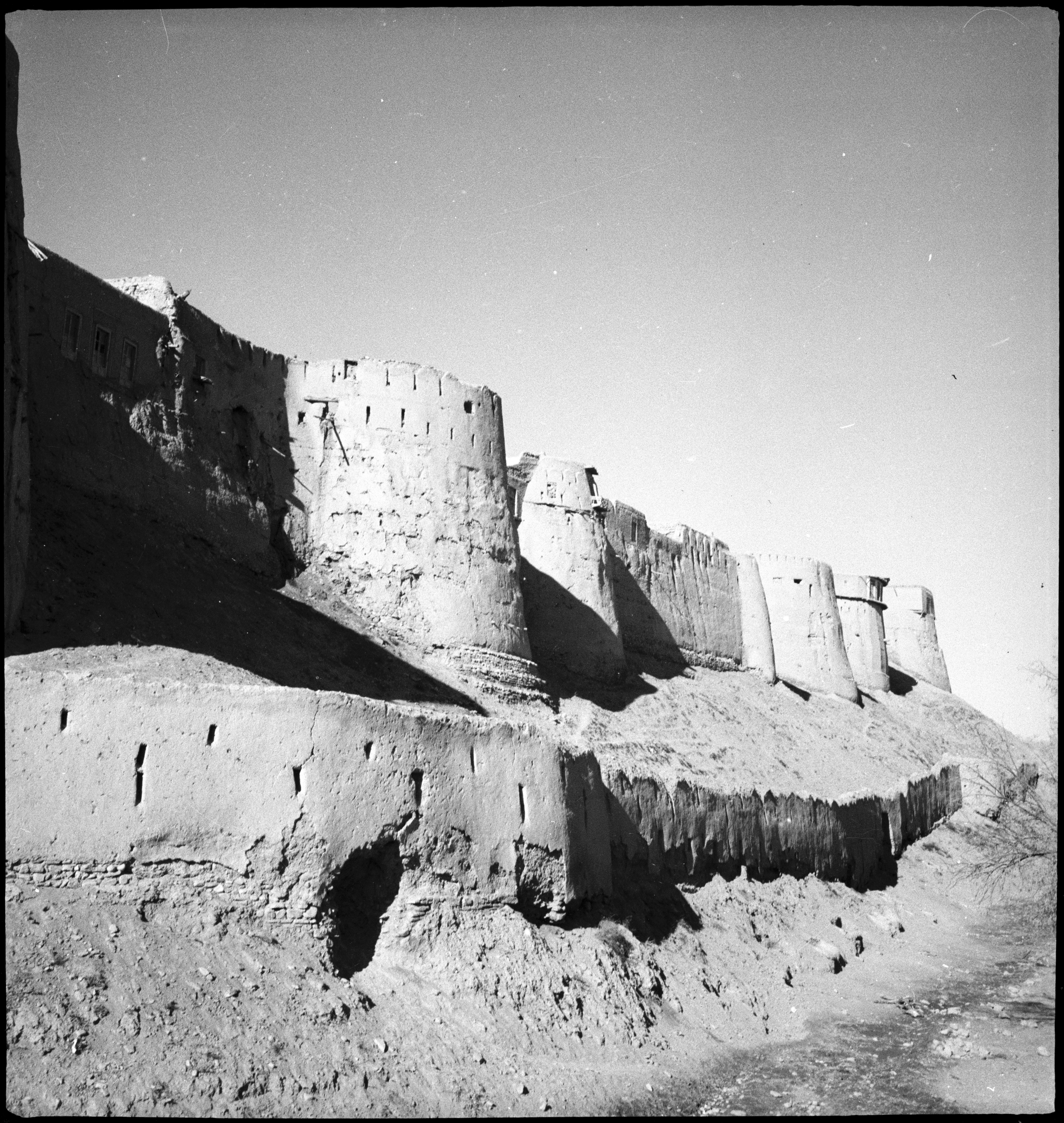
Round towers in the wall, 1939–1940.

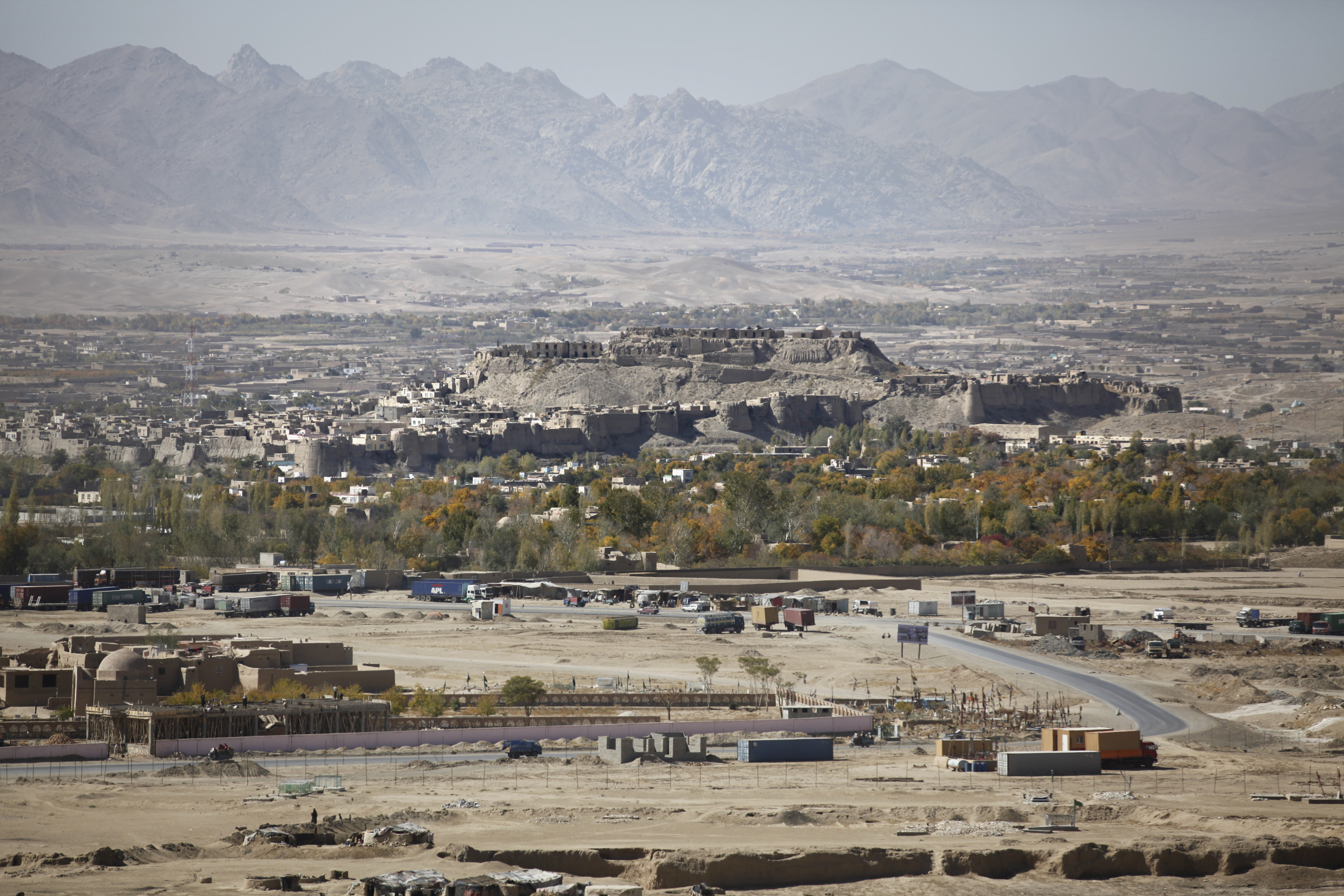
Citadel of Ghazni, seen from the Buddhist monastery of Tapa Sardar

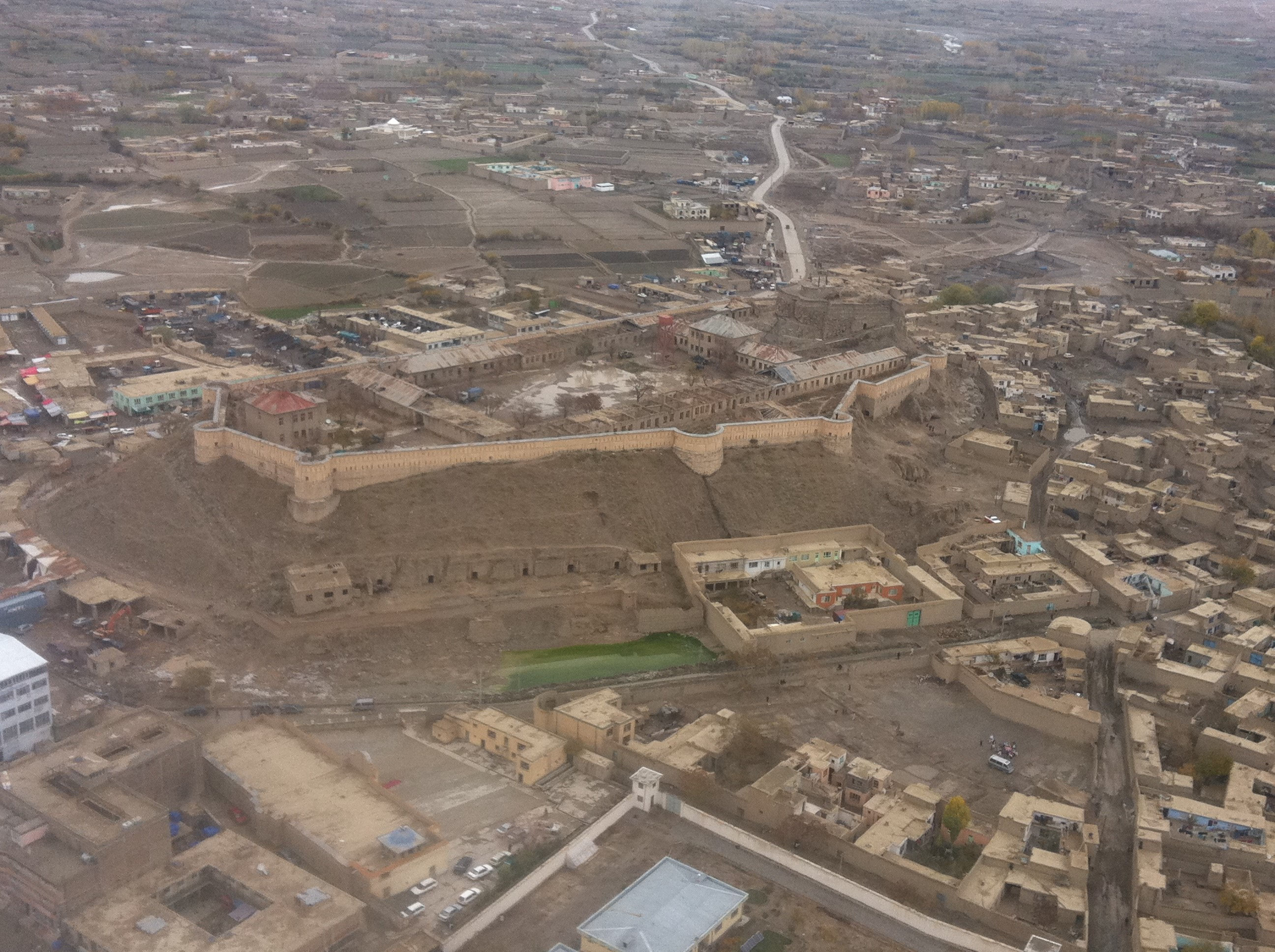
Aerial view of the citadel in 2011.

== See also ==
- Ghazni Minarets
