= Sayed Pervez Kambaksh =

Student accused of blasphemy

Sayed Parwez Kambaksh (Dari: پرویز کامبخش; other spelling variations being Parwiz, Parwez or Pervez Kambaksh) was born 24 July 1984 in Afghanistan. In late 2007, he was a student at Balkh University and a journalist for Jahan-e-Naw (New World), a daily. On 27 October 2007, police arrested Kambaksh, and accused him of "blasphemy and distribution of texts defamatory of Islam". The authorities claimed that Kambaksh had distributed writings posted on the Internet by Arash Bikhoda (Arash the atheist). Bikoda's writings criticize the treatment of women under Islamic law.

On 22 January 2008, the Primary Court in the northern city of Mazar-e-Sharif sentenced Kambaksh to death for "blasphemy and distribution of texts defamatory of Islam". The court's chief judge said, "He insulted the prophet Mohammed. He called him a murderer and a womanizer." The court relied on Kambaksh's confession. Kambaksh denounced the confession as a product of torture. On 29 January 2008, the Upper House of Parliament issued a declaration supporting the death sentence but quickly retracted it because of a technical error.

Kambaksh appealed the decision, and the case moved to a Court of Appeals in Kabul. In October 2008, the court upheld the conviction but commuted the sentence to imprisonment for twenty years.

Kambaksh appealed to the Supreme Court. On 11 or 12 February 2009, the Supreme Court upheld the decision of the Court of Appeals.

In late August 2009, President Hamid Karzai granted amnesty to Kambaksh.

In 2015 it was revealed that Kambaksh had already fled Afghanistan before his amnesty with the help of high-ranking Norwegian and Swedish diplomats. Kambaksh was smuggled out of Afghanistan in secret on board the Swedish government's jet also carrying the visiting Swedish foreign minister Carl Bildt. This exceptional action had been undertaken, according to Bildt in an interview with Expressen, after Karzai had refused pleas for amnesty by Nordic diplomats on Kambaksh's behalf.

== See also ==
- Human rights in Afghanistan
