= Qalat hospital bombing =

Suicide car bombing in Afghanistan

2019 Qalat bombing
- Part of War in Afghanistan (2001–present)
- Qalati Ghilji (Afghanistan)
- Location: 32°6′22″N 66°54′25″E; Qalati Ghilji, Zabul Province, Afghanistan
- Date: 19 September 2019
- Target: Hospital
- Weapon: Suicide car bombing
- Deaths: 39 (+1 attacker)
- Injuries: 140+
- Perpetrator: Unknown

On 19 September 2019, a suicide car bombing occurred outside a hospital in Qalati Ghilji, Zabul Province, Afghanistan. At least 20 people were estimated to be killed and over 90 others injured. By 20 September the death toll had risen to 39, with most of the victims being doctors and patients. More than 140 people were also injured in the attack, although the true number is believed to be higher. The Taliban later claimed that they meant to bomb the National Directorate of Security, a governmental intelligence building next door to the hospital, but were unable to park there so they ended up parking in front of the hospital instead. Governor Rahmatullah Yarmal later said that the hospital had been destroyed. The hospital was the main health facility in Zabul Province before the bombing.
