= June 2017 Lashkargah bombing =

Taliban attack in Lashkargah, Afghanistan

- Part of War in Afghanistan (2001–present)
- Location: Lashkargah, Afghanistan
- Date: 22 June 2017; 12:00 noon
- Attack type: Bombing
- Deaths: 34
- Injuries: 60
- Perpetrator: Taliban

The June 2017 Lashkargah bombing occurred on 22 June 2017, when a suicide attack took place in the New Kabul Bank branch in Lashkargah—the capital of Helmand province in Afghanistan. During this incident, at least 34 people were killed and 60 were injured.

== Attack ==
The attack came from a suicide bomber who detonated explosives at the entrance of the bank at 12 noon local time. The Taliban group, through its spokesman, later admitted to be responsible for the bombing.
