= Abdul Samad Amiri =

Afghan human rights activist (1990–2019)

- Born: 1990; Lal Wa Sarjangal District, Ghor province, Afghanistan
- Died: September 4, 2019 (aged 28–29)

Abdul Samad Amiri was an Afghan human rights activist, whose 2019 murder at the hands of the Taliban was widely reported in the country's media.

== Biography ==
Abdul Samad Amiri was born in 1990 in Lal Wa Sarjangal District of the Ghor province, Afghanistan. He graduated from the Imam Ali High School of Lal Wa Sarjangal district in 2009. Amiri earned his bachelor's degree in political science from Kabul University. After his graduation, he joined New York University in Afghanistan as a field education researcher and collected data for NYU's Assessment of Learning Outcomes and Social Effects of Community Based Education (ALSE) Project. After that, he pursued a career in human rights advocacy.

Amiri was married shortly before his death, and his wife just gave birth to a baby girl. His sister, Atifa, was studying for a master's degree in India when Amiri was shot.

Amiri worked for the Afghanistan Independent Human Rights Commission. He served as the acting director for the Ghor Province. In that role, he worked with the commission to promote the rights of women and religious minorities, as well as investigate killings believed to have been perpetrated by the Taliban.

=== Death ===
Abdul Samad Amiri was killed by the Taliban on September 4, 2019. While traveling from Kabul to Ghowr, the Taliban kidnapped Amiri and killed him the following day. His body was found the following morning on September 5 and his killing came during a very violent period in Afghanistan, as the Taliban and the Afghan government grappled for local control. As a human rights activist with the Afghani Independent Human Rights Commission, Amiri held one of the most dangerous jobs in Afghanistan. Several of his peers have been killed in recent years for human rights activity in the country. He was beheaded by the Taliban on account of his human rights work as well as working for New York University in Afghanistan.

Amnesty International has called Amiri's death a war crime.

== External sources ==
- "Taliban militants behead the acting provincial human rights chief of Ghor". The Khaama Press News Agency. 5 September 2019.
- Amiri, Abdul Samad (24 June 2017). "Remembering a Heartrending Tragedy". A Medium Corporation.
- Gossman, Patricia (6 September 2019). "Taliban Linked to Murder of Afghan Rights Defender". Human Rights Watch.
