= Kohistan District, Badakhshan =

District of Badakhshan Province, Afghanistan

Coordinates: 37°25′42″N 70°40′58″E

Kohistan District
- District
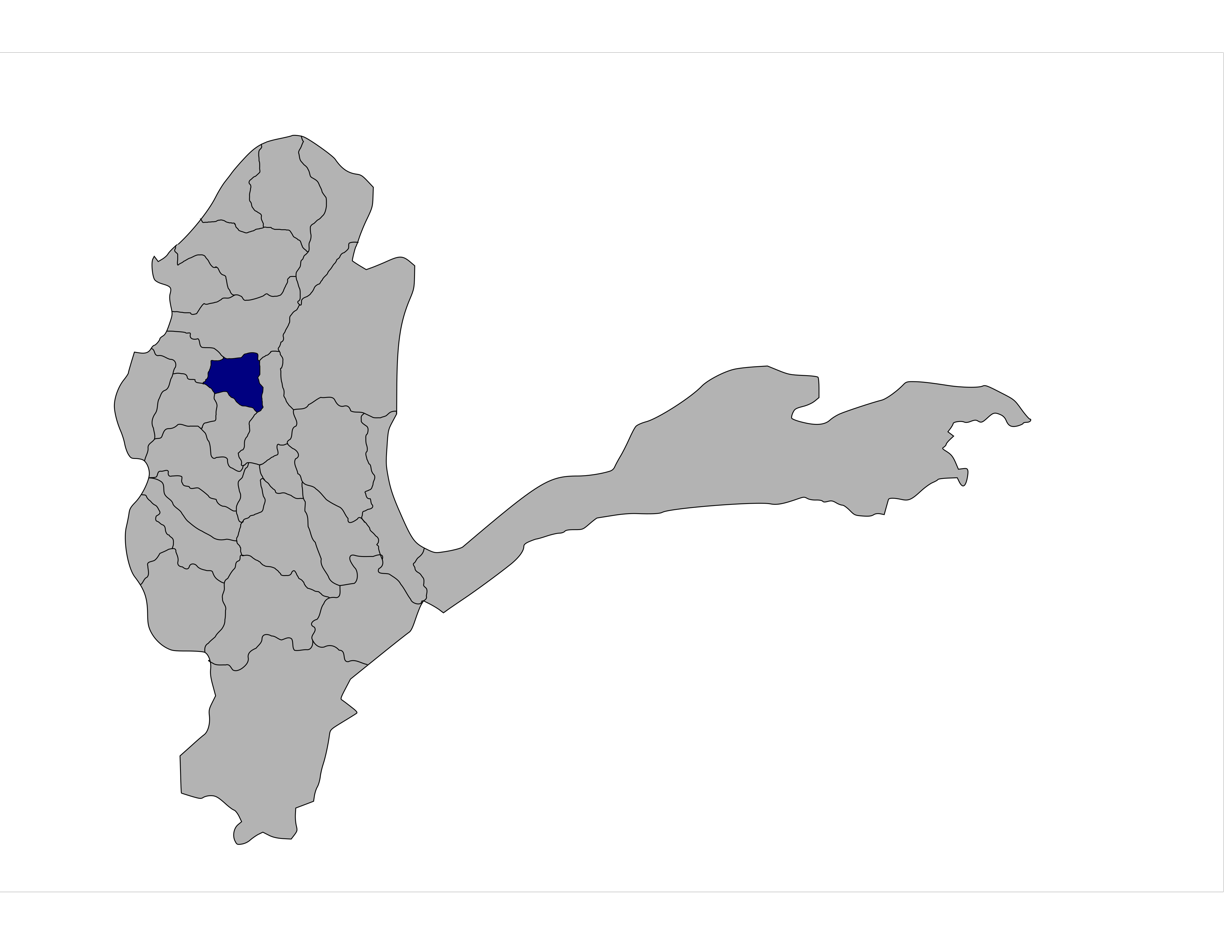
- Kohistan District was formed within Ragh District in 2005
- Country: Afghanistan
- Province: Badakhshan

Government
  - Type: District council

Population
  - Estimate (2019): 18,410

Kohistan District (Dari: ولسوالی کوهستان) is one of the 29 districts of Badakhshan province in eastern Afghanistan. It was created in 1995 from part of Ragh District and is home to approximately 18,410 residents. The provincial capital Kohistan District is the Pas-Pel village.
