= Fazel Hadi Muslimyar =

Afghan politician

Speaker of the House of Elders
- In office 29 January 2011 – 15 August 2021
- Preceded by: Sibghatullah Mojaddedi

Personal details
- Born: 1974 (age 51–52) Nangahar Province
- Party: Dawat-e-Islami party

Fazel Hadi Muslimyar (born in 1974) is a politician from Afghanistan from the Dawat-e-Islami party. He served as president, speaker and chairman of House of Elders from January 2011 until the Fall of Kabul in August 2021.

He was born in 1974 in Dawlatzai village, Chaparhar District Nangahar Province. Muslimyar was elected in 2010 by a majority of votes as the deputy chairman of the House of Elders. About one year later on January 29, 2011, he was elected as chairman of the House of Elders.
