= 2022 in Afghanistan =

- Decades: 2000s; 2010s; 2020s
- See also: Other events of 2022; List of years in Afghanistan

Events in the year 2022 in Afghanistan.

According to the United Nations Development Programme, by 2022, 97% of Afghans could fall under the poverty threshold, which would plunge the country into a major humanitarian crisis.

After the Fall of Kabul, in which the Islamist Taliban drove out the Islamic Republic of Afghanistan government after its 20-year rule, the Taliban promised to set up a new constitution for Afghanistan. The constitution is intended to be adopted in 2022.

The Islamic State continue their insurgency, carrying out many bombings. Afghanistan is also badly affected by earthquakes and flooding.

== Incumbents ==
Photo	Post	Name	Dates
	Supreme Leader	Hibatullah Akhundzada	15 August 2021 – present
	Acting Prime Minister	Hasan Akhund	7 September 2021 – present
	Chief Justice	Abdul Hakim Haqqani	15 August 2021 – present
Haqqani / Yaqoob; Baradar	Deputy Leader	Sirajuddin Haqqani (first); Mullah Yaqoob (second); Abdul Ghani Baradar (third)	15 August 2021 – present
Baradar / Hanafi; Kabir	Acting Deputy Prime Minister	Abdul Ghani Baradar (first); Abdul Salam Hanafi (second); Abdul Kabir (third)	7 September 2021 – present

== Events ==
=== Ongoing ===
- Afghan conflict
  - Islamic State–Taliban conflict
  - Republican insurgency in Afghanistan
  - Afghanistan–Pakistan border skirmishes
  - Killing of Ayman al-Zawahiri
- COVID-19 pandemic in Afghanistan

=== January ===
- 1 January – India sends 500,000 doses of Covaxin to Afghanistan as a part of a humanitarian aid program.
- 9 January – Faizullah Jalal, a professor at Kabul University and a critic of the Taliban, is arrested by the new Government of Afghanistan.
- 13 January – The 2022 Taliban dissension begins.
- 16 January – Last of the 2021–2022 Afghan protests
- 17 January – A 5.3 magnitude earthquake strikes Badghis Province, killing at least 26 people.
- 22 January – Herat bus bombing

=== February ===
- 2 February - Taliban reopens public universities across the country.
- 5 February – Afghanistan–Pakistan border skirmishes – Tehrik-i-Taliban militants based in Afghanistan cross into Kurram District and attack a Pakistani Army checkpoint on the Durand Line, killing five Pakistani soldiers.
- 15 February – Death of Haider
- 24 February – Eight workers for a United Nations polio vaccination program are murdered in four different locations in northern Afghanistan.

=== March ===
- 4 March – Islamic State – Khorasan Province detonate a bomb in a mosque in Paktia Province, killing three people and injuring at least 24.

=== April ===
- 9 April – 2022 Afghanistan-Pakistan clashes
- 16 April – 2022 Pakistani airstrikes in Afghanistan
- 19 April – April 2022 Kabul school bombing
- 21 April – 2022 Mazar-i-Sharif mosque bombing
- 22 April – 2022 Kunduz mosque bombing
- 28 April – 28 April 2022 Mazar-i-Sharif bombings
- 29 April – April 2022 Kabul mosque bombing

=== May ===
- 1 May – Afghanistan's supreme leader Hibatullah Akhundzada made a public appearance on the occasion of Eid al-Fitr.
- 5 May – A series of floods kill 22 people.
- 25 May:
  - May 2022 Kabul mosque bombing
  - 2022 Mazar-i-Sharif minivan bombings

=== June ===
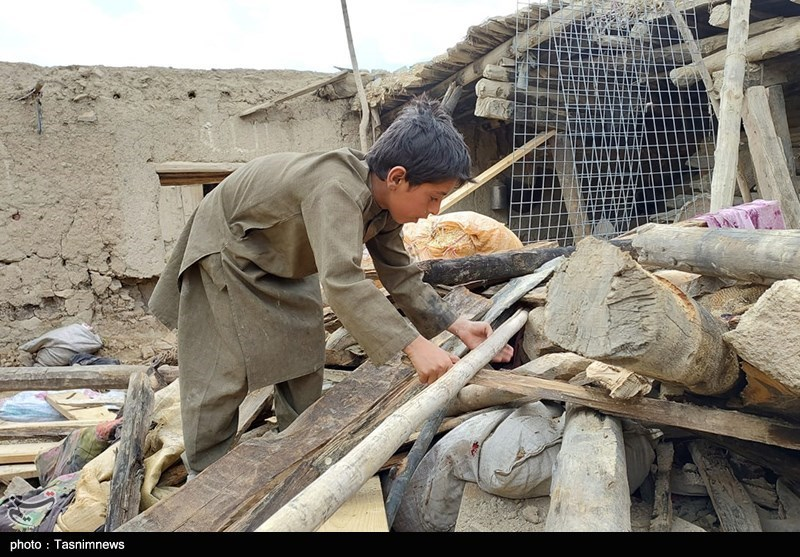
In June, Afghanistan was rocked by one of the deadliest earthquake in 2022

- 22 June – A magnitude 6.0 earthquake strikes Khost Province, killing at least 1,163 people and injuring over 3,000. Over 25 villages were razed to the ground. The Barmal District was worst affected, with nearly half of the fatalities occurring there. 238 others were also killed in the Gayan District, where over 70% of the district's houses collapsed. The Spera District, closest to the earthquake's epicentre, experienced 40 fatalities, and the destruction of 500 homes. It is deadliest earthquake in Afghanistan since 1998.
- 29 June – Afghanistan Ulema gathering

=== July ===
- 31 July - Killing of Ayman al-Zawahiri

=== August ===
- 5 August - 5 August 2022 Kabul bombing
- 5 August - Murder of Hamed Sabouri
- 17 August - August 2022 Kabul mosque bombing

=== September ===
- 2 September - 2022 Herat mosque bombing
- 5 September
  - Bombing of the Russian embassy in Kabul
  - September 2022 Afghanistan earthquake
- 23 September - September 2022 Kabul mosque bombing
- 30 September - September 2022 Kabul school bombing

=== November ===
- 10 November - Ministry of Virtue and Vice issues ban on women from entering parks and gyms throughout the country.
- 30 November - 2022 Aybak bombing

=== December ===
- 6 December - December 2022 Mazar-i-Sharif bombing
- 12 December - 2022 Kabul hotel attack
- 18 December - At least 20 people are killed when a tank truck overturns, explodes and catches fire in the Salang Tunnel.
- 20 December - Taliban bans Afghan women from attending universities cause of islamic shariyyah. Which gives them lots of opportunities.

== See also ==
- Terrorist incidents in Afghanistan in 2022
