= List of massacres in Afghanistan =

The following is a list of massacres that have occurred in Afghanistan (numbers may be approximate). The list does not include collateral damage, especially from raids and airstrikes, which were due to mistaken identity or getting caught in the line of fire.

== Khwarazmian Empire ==
Name	Date	Location	Deaths, Wounded and Captures	Notes
Siege of Herat (1221)	May or June 1221 (first siege) December 1221-June 1222 (second siege)	Herat, Khwarazmian Empire (present-day Herat Province)	1,600,000	a Mongol army commanded by Tolui, son of Genghis Khan, laid siege to the city. After the city fell, the Mongols massacred the entire population and destroyed much of its infrastructure. According to chroniclers, the city was devastated to the point that very little of its former structures survived.
Siege of Bamyan	July 1221	Bamyan, Khwarazmian Empire (present-day Hazarajat)	all the inhabitants of the city	The ruler Genghis Khan leads a Mongol force that besieges and captures the fortified city of Bamyan after fierce resistance; during the fighting, his grandson Mutukan is killed, prompting a brutal massacre of the city’s defenders and its population

== Durrani Empire and Anglo-Afghan War ==
Name	Date	Location	Deaths, Wounded and Captures	Notes
1842 retreat from Kabul	January 6–13, 1842	Between Kabul and Jalalabad via Gandamak	Approx 16,500 (figure may incorporate: the missing and captured as well)	4,000 soldiers of the British East India Company and 12,000 civilians and camp followers.
Hazara genocide	1888–1893	Hazaristan	Tens of thousands	Afghan Troops Massacre Hazaras and take their land known as Hazaristan Over 60% of the total Hazara population was either killed or displaced by the massacre.

== Khalq communist rule ==
Name	Date	Location	Deaths, Wounded and Captures	Notes
1979 Herat uprising	March 1979	Herat	Thousands disappeared without trace	3,000–25,000 In 1992, a mass grave was uncovered, containing 2,000 bodies of those killed by the DRA repression.
Kerala massacre by the PDPA	April 1979	Kerala, Kunar Province	1,170–1,260 killed	Unarmed males murdered by the army
Chindawol uprising	June 1979	Chindawol	Thousands disappeared without trace	Crack-down by government forces reported, including 4-hour battle, and around 10,000 Hazaras and Qizilbash arrested. Abdul Majid Kalakani was executed.

== Soviet-Afghan War ==
Name	Date	Location	Deaths, Wounded and Captures	Notes
Operation Storm-333	December 27, 1979	Kabul	350 killed (Afghanistan side), and 14 killed (Soviet side)	25 (Soviet side) wounded. 1,700 Afghan soldiers surrendered and 150 Palace and Leader's Guards captured.
3 Hoot uprising	February 22, 1980	Kabul	600	5,000+ arrested.
1980 student protests in Kabul	Late April to early June, 1980	Kabul	72 and 200	Students poisoned; 400 to 2000 arrested and a student, Nahid Saaed killed.
Siege of Urgun	August 1983-January 16, 1984	Urgun, Paktika Province	600 killed and 243 surrendered (Soviet claimed)	The 243 prisoners were released.
Laghman massacre	April 1985	Laghman Province	~500 to ~1,000	Soviet reprisals against civilians against alleged anti-communist resistance groups.
Battle of Maravar Pass	April 21–2 2, 1985	Sangam and Daridam, Kunar Province	31 (Soviet side); Unknown captured	Fatalities from the Afghan Mujahideen side is unknown.
Badaber uprising	April 25–2 6, 1985	Badaber, Pakistan	52 killed (Soviet side); Soviet claimed 100 to 200 Afghan mujahideen's killed.	Afghan mujahideen claimed killing of 20 people.
1985 Bakhtar Afghan Airlines Antonov An-26 shootdown	September 4, 1985	Kandahar	52	A Bakhtar Afghan Airlines An-26 (YA-BAM) was shot down by a SAM near Kandahar, killing all 52 people on board.
Battles of Zhawar	First battle: September–October 1985; Second battle: February 28 – April 19, 1986	First battle: Zhawar, Paktia Province; Second battle: Zhawar, Khost Province	184 killed, 321 wounded and 530 captured (Afghan Mujahideen side); 281+ killed and 363+ wounded (Soviet and Afghanistan/DRA side)	Specific numbers: First battle: 106 killed and 321 wounded (Afghan Mujahideen side); Unknown but expected heavy fatalities for Soviet and Afghanistan side; Second battle: 530 captured, 78 executed and 24 helicopters destroyed (Afghan Mujahideen side); 28 killed and 363 wounded (Soviet and Afghanistan side).
Battle of Jaji	April 17 – June 13, 1987	Paktia province	2+ killed (Soviet and Afghanistan side); 120+ killed (Afghan Mujahideen side)	Osama Bin Laden wounded.
Battle of Arghandab (1987)	May 22 – Late June, 1987	Arghandab District, Kandahar Province	60+ killed (Afghan Mujahideen side)	500 killed and wounded; 1200 captured (Afghanistan/DRA side).
Operation Magistral	November 19, 1987-January 10, 1988	Paktia province	Soviet: 24 killed and 56 wounded; Afghanistan/DRA: 300 killed and 700 wounded	On the Haqqani Network side 150 to 300 killed.
Battle for Hill 3234	January 7–8, 1988	Paktia Province, near the Afghanistan–Pakistan border	6 killed and 28 wounded (Soviet side); 200–250 killed (Afghan mujahideen side).	Two of the Soviet soldiers, Vyacheslav Aleksandrov and Andrey Melnikov, posthumously awarded the Gold Star of the Hero.
Operation Arrow	October 23-November 7, 1988	Laghman Province	18 killed and 53 wounded (Afghan Mujahideen side); 500 killed and wounded, and 223 captured (Afghanistan/ DRA side)	This was a military offensive by Mjuahideen.
Soviet withdrawal from Afghanistan	May 15, 1988 – February 15, 1989	Democratic Republic of Afghanistan	523 killed (Soviet side)	Unknown fatalities (Afghan Mujahideen side).

== Civil war ==
Name	Date	Location	Deaths, Wounded and Captures	Notes
Mass bombardment of Kabul by Hezb-i Islami	1992–1993	Kabul	50,000	
Afshar massacre by Sayyaf's Ittihad-e-Islami	February 10–11, 1993	Kabul	570–750	4,000–6,000 deaths in total 700–750 kidnapped by Ittihad and presumed dead
Mass bombardment of Kabul by Hezb-i Islami	January 1994	Kabul	24,000	
Mass bombardment of Kabul by the Taliban	1995	Kabul	800–4,000	
1995 attack on the Embassy of Pakistan in Kabul	September 6, 1995	Kabul	1 killed and 26 wounded	
15 massacre campaigns by the Taliban and Al-Qaeda	1996–2 001	Northern, central and western Afghanistan	+15,000	United Nations: "These are the same type of war crimes as were committed in Bosnia and should be prosecuted in national courts". See some campaigns listed below. The Hazara claim the Taliban executed 15,000 of their people in their campaign through northern and central Afghanistan.
Mazar-i-Sharif massacre by Junbish	May and July 1997	Mazar-i-Sharif	Up to 3,000	Junbish general Abdul Malik Pahlawan "is widely believed to have been responsible for the brutal massacre of up to 3,000 Taliban prisoners after inviting them into Mazar-i-Sharif."
Battles of Mazar-i-Sharif (1997–1998)	May 22, 1997-August 14, 1998	Near Mazar-i-Sharif, Northern Afghanistan	May to July 1997: about 3000 killed or wounded; September to December 1997: 86 civilians killed; 8 August 1998: 1400 soldiers from the Hazara army and additional 8000+ noncombatant killed	
Anti-Hazara massacre in Mazar-i-Sharif	August 8–10, 1998	Mazar-i-Sharif	2,000 to 20,000	
Taliban starvation of refugees	1998	Northern Afghanistan	Thousands	Denial of UN emergency food supplies to 160,000 starving refugees by the Taliban
Istalif campaign by the Taliban and Al-Qaeda	1999	Istalif	Unknown	Nity with 45,000 homes razed completely
Gosfandi massacre by the Taliban	1999	Gosfandi District, Sar-e Pol	96	The Taliban were accused of committing five massacres in the Gosfandi district in the 1990s.
Deliberate destruction of civilian livelihood	1999	Shomali Plain	Hundreds of thousands	Civilians killing, torture, mass rape and other atrocities reported
Robatak Pass killings	January 14, 2000	pass connecting the settlements of Tashkurgan and Pule Khumri	31	Taliban perpetrated the mass murders. 26 of the victims were Ismaili Hazara from Baghlan province
Civilian killings by the Taliban	January 2001	Yakawlang	250–3000	

== War in Afghanistan (2001–2021) ==
- Note: According to the United Nations, 75–80% of civilian casualties in the War in Afghanistan were caused by the Taliban and other "resistance" groups from 2009 to 2011. This list is incomplete and does not represent these official figures properly.

Name	Date	Location	Deaths, Wounded and Captures	Notes
Battle of Qala-i-Jangi	November 25-December 1, 2001	Qala-i-Jangi, Balkh Province	500+	
Dasht-i-Leili massacre of Taliban prisoners by Junbish-i Milli	December 2001	Dasht-i-Leili desert	250–3000	Taliban prisoners were allegedly shot and/or suffocated to death in metal shipping containers.
2002 Kabul bombing	December 5, 2002	Kabul	26 killed and 167 wounded	The Taliban, al-Qaeda, and Gulbuddin Hekmatyar's group have all been suspected.
2004 Deh Rawood bombing	January 31, 2004	Deh Rawood, Deh Rawood District, Uruzgan province	8	A Remote-controlled bomb destroyed a vehicle, killing Mayor Khalif Sadaht and seven of his relatives. Five people were wounded.
2004 Kunduz attack	June 9, 2004	Kunduz, Kunduz Province	11	Eleven Chinese aid workers from Jiangxi province were killed in their compound by a score of armed men in Kunduz, and another 4–5 were wounded
2006 Tarinkot bombing	January 5, 2006	Tarinkot, Uruzgan province	11	A suicide bomber carried out an attack in the city of Tirin Kot, in southern Uruzgan province, a few hundred yards away from where US ambassador to Afghanistan Ronald Neumann was meeting with local leaders. The explosion killed at least 10 civilians and wounded approximately 50 others. The US Ambassador was unhurt in the blast. The Taliban claimed responsibility for the attack and said the bomb was intended to kill “high-ranking Americans.”
Attempted assassination of Dick Cheney	February 27, 2007	Bagram	23	A suicide bombing at the outer gate of the Bagram Airfield left at least 23 people dead and injured 20 others.
2007 Shinwar shooting	March 4, 2007	Shinwar District, Nangarhar Province	7–19 killed	Killing of Afghan civilians by United States forces. Details of the shooting remains disputed.
2007 Helmand Province airstrikes	June 22, 2007	Helmand Province	45	At least 45 Afghan civilians were killed in NATO-led airstrikes
2008 Kabul Serena Hotel attack	January 14, 2008	Kabul	6 to 7 people killed and 6 wounded	Taliban claimed responsibility.
2008 Kandahar bombing	February 17, 2008	Kandahar	100 killed and 100 wounded	Crowd of people who were watching a dog-fighting competition were attacked.
Sarposa prison attack of 2008	June 13, 2008	Kandahar	15 policemen killed from the Islamic Republic of Afghanistan side. 10 killed from Taliban side.	Reportedly, attack was carried out by Taliban insurgents.
Haska Meyna wedding party airstrike	July 6, 2008	Haska Meyna, Haska Meyna District, Nangarhar Province	47	
2008 Indian embassy bombing in Kabul	July 7, 2008	Kabul	58 killed and 141 wounded	Taliban and Haqqani network are the alleged perpetrators.
Azizabad airstrike	August 22, 2008	Herat Province	At least 90 killed	An airstrike carried out by United States Air Force.
February 2009 raids on Kabul	February 11, 2009	Kabul	21 killed and 57 wounded	Series of strikes by the Taliban against Afghan government targets.
Granai airstrike	May 4, 2009	Granai, Farah Province	86 to 147 killed	Airstrike carried out by the United States Air Force.
2009 NATO Afghanistan headquarters bombing	August 15, 2009	Kabul	7 killed and 91 wounded	Attack was carried out by a Taliban suicide bomber.
2009 Kandahar bombing	August 25, 2009	Kandahar	43 killed and 65+ wounded	The Taliban were thought to be responsible. The target was apparently the headquarters of a Japanese construction company.
2009 bombing of Indian embassy in Kabul Haqqani network	October 8, 2009	Kabul	17 killed and 83 wounded	The Taliban were the alleged perpetrators.
2009 UN guest house attack in Kabul	October 28, 2009	Kabul	11 killed	Five UN staff, two Afghan security personnel and an Afghan civilians were killed.
January 2010 Kabul attack	January 18, 2010	Kabul	12 killed and 71 wounded	Taliban gunmen were the reported perpetrators.
Uruzgan helicopter attack	February 21, 2010	Uruzgan	27–3 3	Killing of Afghan civilians, including over 20 men, four women and one child, by United States Army with another 12 civilians wounded
February 2010 Kabul attack	February 28, 2010	Kabul	18 killed and 36 wounded	Taliban, Lashkar-e-Taiba is reported as perpetrator.
Maywand District killings	January-May 2010	Kandahar province	3 killed	A group of U.S. Army soldiers are the reported perpetrators.
May 2010 Kabul bombing	May 18, 2010	Kabul	18 killed and 52 wounded	Taliban are the reported perpetrators.
Nadahan wedding bombing	June 9, 2010	Nagahan, Arghandab District, Kandahar Province	40	at least 40 civilians were killed in a suicide bomb attack at a wedding in the Arghandab District of southern Kandahar Province
2010 Badakhshan massacre by the Taliban	August 6, 2010	Badakhshan	10 killed	Victims were 6 Americans, 2 Afghans, 1 Briton and 1 German.
Kabul Bank shooting by the Taliban	February 19, 2011	Jalalabad	40 killed and 73+ wounded	Aljazeera reported that at least seven suicide bombers stormed a branch of the Kabul Bank.
2011 Inter-Continental Hotel Kabul attack	June 28, 2011	Kabul	21 killed	Taliban were reported as perpetrator.
September 2011 Kabul attack	September 13, 2011	Kabul	7 killed and 15 wounded	Taliban were the reported perpetrator.
2011 Afghanistan Ashura bombings	December 6, 2011	Kabul and Mazar-i-Sharif	80+ killed and 160+ wounded	Suicide bombing in Kabul and Mazar-i-Sharif is reported as the cause for fatalities.
Kandahar massacre	March 11, 2012	Kandahar province	16 killed and 6 wounded	Robert Bales is the reported perpetrator.
April 2012 Afghanistan attacks	April 15–1 6, 2012	Kabul	47 killed and 44 wounded	Afghan Taliban and Haqqani Network are reported as perpetrators.
11 June 2013 Kabul bombing	June 11, 2012	Kabul	17 killed and 39 wounded	Taliban took responsibility for the attack.
2013 Afghan presidential palace attack	June 25, 2012	Kabul	11 killed	Taliban were the reported perpetrators.
Forward Operating Base Delhi Massacre by the Taliban	August 10, 2012	Helmand Province	3 killed and 1 wounded	Chai Boy of Afghan District Police Chief Sarwar Jan was the reported perpetrator.
January 2014 Kabul restaurant attack	January 17, 2014	Kabul	22 killed	Taliban were reported as perpetrator.
2014 Kabul Serena Hotel shooting	March 20, 2014	Kabul	9 killed and 2 wounded	Taliban were reported as perpetrator.
2014 Paktika car bombing	July 15, 2014	Paktika	89 killed and 42 wounded	Haqqani network were the reported perpetrator.
2014 Yahyakhel suicide bombing	November 23, 2014	Yahya Khel District, Paktika Province	61 killed	It was a suicide bombing.
December 2014 Kabul bombings	December 11, 2014	Kabul	12 killed and 7 injured	Taliban gunmen were the reported perpetrators.
2015 Park Palace guesthouse attack	March 13, 2015	Shāre Naw, Kabul	14 killed and 6 wounded	The Taliban were thought to be responsible.
2015 Jalalabad suicide bombing	April 18, 2015	Jalalabad, Nangarhar Province	33 killed and 100 wounded	Islamic State of Iraq and the Levant – Khorasan Province were the reported perpetrator.
2015 Kabul Parliament attack	June 22, 2015	Kabul	9 killed and 40 wounded	Terrorist attack against Mohammed Masoom Stanekzai.
7 August 2015 Kabul attacks	August 7, 2015	Kabul	50+ killed and 500+ wounded	Taliban were reported as perpetrator.
10 August 2015 Kabul suicide bombing	August 10, 2015	Kabul	5 killed and 16 wounded	The Taliban claimed responsibility for the attack.
22 August 2015 Kabul suicide bombing	August 22, 2015	Kabul	10 killed and 60 wounded	Part of Taliban insurgency.
Kunduz hospital airstrike	October 3, 2015	Kunduz Province	42 killed and at least 30 injured	A United States Air Force AC-130U gunship attacked the Kunduz Trauma Centre operated by Médecins Sans Frontières.
2015 Zabul beheading by Islamic State	November 9, 2015	Zabul Province	7 killed	Islamic State is the reported perpetrator.
2015 Spanish Embassy attack in Kabul	April 19, 2016	Kabul	9 killed and 7 wounded	The Taliban claimed responsibility for the attack.
April 2016 Kabul attack	April 19, 2016	Kabul	69 killed and 367 wounded	Taliban are the reported perpetrators.
Kabul attack on Canadian Embassy guards	June 20, 2016	Kabul	16 killed and 9 wounded	Attack claimed to be conducted by the Taliban or the Islamic State in Khorasan Province.
July 2016 Kabul bombing	July 23, 2016	Kabul	97+ killed and 260 wounded	Islamic State – Khorasan Province are the reported perpetrator.
American University of Afghanistan attack	August 24, 2016	Kabul	20 killed and 53+ wounded	Taliban were the reported perpetrator.
September 2016 Kabul attacks	September 5–6, 2016	Kabul	42 to 58 killed and 109 wounded	Taliban were the reported perpetrator.
January 2017 Afghanistan bombings	January 10, 2017	Kabul, Kandahar, and in Lashkargah	68+ to 98+ killed and 94+ wounded	Taliban (claimed the first and the third bombing, denied responsibility of the second bombing); Haqqani network (suspected of the second bombing).
March 2017 Kabul attack	March 8, 2017	Daoud Khan Military Hospital, Kabul	49–100+ killed and 63+ wounded	The Islamic State of Iraq and the Levant claimed to have carried out the attack, but officials suspected the Haqqani network instead."
2017 Camp Shaheen attack	April 21, 2017	Mazar-e-Sharif	All killed (Taliban and Haqqani network side), and 140–256 killed and 160+ wounded (Afghan soldiers side)	This was an attack on Afghan National Army by at least ten Taliban fighters.
May 2017 Kabul attack	May 31, 2017	Kabul	90–150+ killed and 413+ wounded	Fatalities and casualties were caused by Truck bomb.
20 October 2017 Afghanistan attacks	October 20, 2017	Kabul	60+	Suicide bombing
28 December 2017 Kabul suicide bombing	December 28, 2017	Kabul	50 killed and 80 wounded	Attack was reported as Anti-Shi'ism. The attack killed 50 people and injured over 80.
2018 Inter-Continental Hotel Kabul attack	January 20, 2018	Kabul	46 killed and 14 wounded	Taliban were the reported perpetrator.
Kabul ambulance bombing	January 27, 2018	Kabul	103 killed and 235 wounded	Taliban were the reported perpetrators.
March 2018 Kabul suicide bombing	March 21, 2018	Kabul	34 killed and 65 wounded	Attack was reported as Anti-Shi'ism.
22 April 2018 Kabul suicide bombing	April 22, 2018	Kabul	69 killed and 120 wounded	Islamic State of Iraq and the Levant – Khorasan Province were the reported perpetrator.
30 April 2018 Kabul suicide bombings	April 30, 2018	Kabul	29 killed and 50 wounded	Islamic State of Iraq and the Levant – Khorasan Province were the reported perpetrators.
August 2018 Gardez mosque attack	August 3, 2018	Gardez, Paktika Province	48 (including two perpetrators)	Two militants dressed in burqa entered a Shiite mosque in the town of Gardez in the province of Paktia and opened fire. Both attackers later blew themselves up.
September 2018 Kabul attacks	September 6, 2018	Kabul	26	91 wounded
2019 Kabul mosque bombing	July 1, 2019	Kabul	3	20 wounded
1 July 2019 Kabul attack	July 1, 2019	Kabul	45	105 wounded
2019 Ghazni bombing by the Taliban	July 7, 2019	Ghazni	15	180 wounded
28 July 2019 Kabul suicide bombing	July 28, 2019	Kabul	20+ killed and 50 wounded	Four gunmen stormed the building and laid siege for hours before killed.
7 August 2019 Kabul bombing	August 7, 2019	Kabul	14 killed and 145 wounded	A suicide car bomb exploded at a security checkpoint outside a police station.
17 August 2019 Kabul bombing	August 17, 2019	Kabul	92 killed and 142 wounded	Suicide bombing occurred in a wedding hall.
2 and 5 September 2019 Kabul bombings	September 2 and 5, 2019	Kabul	28 killed and 159+ wounded	Victims were Afghans and foreign nationals.
17 September 2019 Afghanistan bombings	September 17, 2019	Charikar, Kabul	50 killed and 80 wounded	Attacks were carried out with two different suicide bombers in sperate locations.
2019 Qalat bombing	September 19, 2019	Qalati Ghilji	40 killed and 140+ wounded	Suicide car bombing outside a hospital in Qalati Ghilji is the reported cause.
6 March 2020 Kabul shooting	March 6, 2020	Kabul	32 killed and 82 wounded	Islamic State of Iraq and the Levant – Khorasan Province is the reported perpetrator.
Kabul gurdwara attack	March 25, 2020	Kabul	25 killed and 8+ wounded	Abu Khalid al-Hindi is reported as peretrator.
2020 Kabul University attack	November 2, 2020	Kabul	35 killed and 50 wounded	The attack was carried out by ISIS-K.
Murders of Enikass Radio workers by Islamic State	March 2, 2021	Jalalabad	3 women killed.	
2021 Kabul school bombing	May 8, 2021	Dashte Barchi	90 killed and 240 wounded	The attack was carried out by ISIS-K.
2021 Kabul hospital attack	November 2, 2021	Kabul	30+ killed and 50+ wounded	The attack was carried out by ISIS-K.

== Present day Taliban era ==
Name	Date	Location	Death, Wounded and Captured	Notes
2021 Kabul airport attack	August 26, 2021	Kabul Province	183 killed and 150+ injured	The 182 fatalities include 170 Afghan civilians and 13 members of the United States military.
August 2021 Kabul drone strike	August 29, 2021	Kabul	10 killed	Drone strike carried out by United States Central Command.
Sayed Abad mosque bombing	October 8, 2021	Kunduz Province	50+ killed and 143 wounded	Suicide attack by ISIS-K.
2021 Kandahar Shia Mosque bombing	October 15, 2021	Kandahar province	65 killed and 70+ wounded	Suicide attack by ISIS-K.
Herat bus bombing	January 22, 2022	Herat	7 killed and 9 wounded	Bomb was attached to the vehicle's fuel tank.
2022 Pakistani airstrikes in Afghanistan	April 16, 2022	Spera District, Khost Province and Kunar Province	47 killed and 23 wounded	This was part of the insurgency in Khyber Pakhtunkhwa and Afghanistan–Pakistan skirmishes.
April 2022 Kabul school bombing	April 19, 2022	Kabul	6 killed and 25 wounded	This attack is described as part of Persecution of Shias by the Islamic State.
2022 Mazar-i-Sharif mosque bombing	April 21, 2022	Mazar-i-Sharif, Balkh Province	31 killed and 87 wounded	Attack by the Islamic State – Khorasan Province.
2022 Kunduz mosque bombing	April 22, 2022	Kunduz	33 killed and 43 wounded	Islamic State – Khorasan Province is reported as the suspected attacker.
28 April 2022 Mazar-i-Sharif bombings	April 28, 2022	Mazar-i-Sharif, Balkh Province	11 killed and 13 wounded	Double bombing targeted public transportation.
April 2022 Kabul mosque bombing	April 29, 2022	Kabul	10–50+ killed and 30 wounded	Attack occurred in the holy month of Ramadan.
May 2022 Kabul mosque bombing	May 25, 2022	Kabul	5–11+ killed and 17 wounded	Explosives detonated during the Maghrib prayer.
2022 Mazar-i-Sharif minivan bombings	May 25, 2022	Mazar-i-Sharif, Balkh Province	9 killed and 15 wounded	Attacks believed to have been directed at Afghan Shia passengers.
5 August 2022 Kabul bombing	August 5, 2022	Kabul	8 killed and 18 wounded	Attack by the Islamic State – Khorasan Province.
August 2022 Kabul mosque bombing	August 17, 2022	Kabul	21+ killed and 33+ wounded	Islamic State – Khorasan Province (suspected) for perpetrating the attack.
2022 Herat mosque bombing	September 2, 2022	Herat	19 killed and 23 wounded	Islamic State – Khorasan Province (suspected) for perpetrating the attack.
Bombing of the Russian embassy in Kabul	September 5, 2022	Kabul	8–10+ and 15–20 wounded	Islamic State – Khorasan Province (suspected) for perpetrating the attack.
September 2022 Kabul mosque bombing	September 23, 2022	Kabul	7 killed and 41 wounded	Explosion happened as worshippers leave the mosque after finishing Friday prayers.
September 2022 Kabul school bombing	September 30, 2022	Kabul	25-52 killed, and 110 wounded	Attack occurred at the Kaaj education center. The majority of the victims were young female students.
December 2022 Mazar-i-Sharif bombing	December 6, 2022	Mazar-i-Sharif, Balkh Province	7 killed and 6 wounded	Bomb was planted on the side of the road.
2022 Kabul hotel attack	December 12, 2022	Kabul	6 killed and 18 wounded	Islamic State – Khorasan Province (suspected) for perpetrating the attack.
2023 Kabul airport bombing	January 1, 2023	Hamid Karzai International Airport, Kabul	20 killed and 30 wounded	Attack by the Islamic State – Khorasan Province
Ministry of Foreign Affairs of Afghanistan bombing	January 11, 2023	Kabul	20+ killed	Suicide bombing by the Islamic State – Khorasan Province
November 2023 Kabul bombing	November 7, 2023	Kabul	7 killed and 20 wounded	Attack by the Islamic State – Khorasan Province
2024 Kandahar New Kabul Bank bombing	March 21, 2024	Kandahar	21+ killed and 50+ wounded	Suicide bombing by the Islamic State – Khorasan Province
2024 Qala Bakhtiar bombing	September 2, 2024	Kabul	7 killed (including the perpetrator) and 13 wounded	Suicide bombing by the Islamic State – Khorasan Province
2026 Kabul hospital airstrike	March 16 2026	Kabul	269+ killed and 122+injured	Airstrike by the PAF.

== See also ==
- List of massacres against Hazaras
