= 2022 Kabul bombing =

2022 Kabul bombing may refer to:

- April 2022 Kabul mosque bombing
- April 2022 Kabul school bombing
- May 2022 Kabul mosque bombing
- 5 August 2022 Kabul bombing
- August 2022 Kabul mosque bombing
- Bombing of the Russian embassy in Kabul
- September 2022 Kabul mosque bombing
- September 2022 Kabul school bombing
