= Terrorist incidents in Afghanistan in 2022 =

This article is an incomplete outline of terrorist incidents in Afghanistan in 2022 in chronological order.

== January–March ==
- 22 January - Herat bus bombing
- 4 March - Islamic State – Khorasan Province detonates a bomb in a mosque in Paktia Province, killing three people and injuring at least 24.

== April–June ==
- 19 April - April 2022 Kabul school bombing
- 21 April - 2022 Mazar-i-Sharif mosque bombing
- 22 April - 2022 Kunduz mosque bombing
- 28 April - 28 April 2022 Mazar-i-Sharif bombings
- 29 April - April 2022 Kabul mosque bombing
- 25 May :
  - May 2022 Kabul mosque bombing
  - 2022 Mazar-i-Sharif minivan bombings

== July–September ==
- 5 August - 5 August 2022 Kabul bombing
- 17 August - August 2022 Kabul mosque bombing
- 5 September - Bombing of the Russian embassy in Kabul
- 23 September - September 2022 Kabul mosque bombing
- 30 September - September 2022 Kabul school bombing

== October–December ==
- 30 November - 2022 Aybak bombing
- 6 December - December 2022 Mazar-i-Sharif bombing
- 12 December - 2022 Kabul hotel attack

== See also ==
- List of 2021 Afghanistan attacks
