= Herat attack =

Herat attack or Herat campaign may refer to:

- 2013 attack on U.S. consulate in Herat
- 2014 attack on Indian consulate in Herat
- June 2017 Herat mosque bombing
- August 2017 Herat mosque attack
- Herat bus bombing, in 2022
- 2022 Herat mosque bombing

== See also ==
- Battle of Herat
