= Kabul mosque bombing =

Kabul mosque bombing may refer to:

- 2019 Kabul mosque bombing
- April 2022 Kabul mosque bombing
- May 2022 Kabul mosque bombing
- September 2022 Kabul mosque bombing
