= Kabul school bombing =

Kabul school bombing may refer to:

- 2021 Kabul school bombing
- April 2022 Kabul school bombing
- September 2022 Kabul school bombing
