= 2022 Kabul mosque bombing =

2022 Kabul mosque bombing may refer to:

- April 2022 Kabul mosque bombing
- May 2022 Kabul mosque bombing
- August 2022 Kabul mosque bombing
- September 2022 Kabul mosque bombing
