= Battle of Herat =

Battle, siege, capture, campaign, war, civil war, uprising, or fall of Herat may refer to:

- Battle of Herat (589)
- Battle of Herat (484) part of the Hephthalite–Sasanian Wars
- Siege of Herat (652), part of the Muslim conquest of Persia
- Siege of Herat (1221), part of the Mongol invasion of Khorasan
- Battle of Herat (1270), part of the Kaidu–Kublai war
- Siege of Herat (1381), by Timur
- Siege of Herat (1448), part of the Timurid Civil Wars
- Capture of Herat (1458), part of the Qara Qoyunlu–Timurid War
- Battle of Herat (1598), part of the Persian–Uzbek wars
- Herat campaign of 1729, part of the Campaigns of Nader Shah
- Battle of Herat (1729), Campaigns of Nader Shah
- Herat campaign of 1730–1732, part of the Campaigns of Nader Shah
- Siege of Herat (1731–1732), part of the Campaigns of Nader Shah
- Siege of Herat (1833), part of the Iranian-Herati conflict
- Herati Civil War (1823–1829), part of the Iranian-Herati conflict
- First Herat War, part of the Iranian-Herati conflict
- Second Herat War, part of the Iranian-Herati conflict
- Herat campaign of 1862–1863 part of the Great Game
- 1979 Herat uprising, part of the 1979 uprisings in Afghanistan
- 2001 uprising in Herat, part of the War in Afghanistan (2001–2021)
- Fall of Herat, part of the War in Afghanistan (2001–2021)

== See also ==
- Herat attack (disambiguation)
