= September 2022 Kabul bombing =

September 2022 Kabul bombing may refer to:

- September 2022 Kabul mosque bombing
- September 2022 Kabul school bombing
