= 2022 Kabul school bombing =

2022 Kabul school bombing may refer to:

- April 2022 Kabul school bombing
- September 2022 Kabul school bombing
