= May 2022 Afghanistan explosions =

May 2022 Afghanistan explosions may refer to:

- 2022 Mazar-i-Sharif minivan bombings
- May 2022 Kabul mosque bombing
