= August 2022 Kabul bombing =

August 2022 Kabul bombing may refer to:

- 5 August 2022 Kabul bombing
- August 2022 Kabul mosque bombing, which happened on 17 August
