= Explosions on 21 April 2022 in Afghanistan =

- Part of the Persecution of Shias by the Islamic State
- Location: Afghanistan
- Date: 21 April 2022
- Target: Hazaras
- Attack type: Bombing
- Deaths: 31+
- Injuries: 90+
- Perpetrator: Unknown

On April 21, 2022, several separate explosions rocked different parts of Afghanistan. The first explosion occurred at the biggest Shia Muslim Seh Dokan mosque in Mazar-e-Sharif, Afghanistan. Over 31 people were killed and another 87 injured in the mosque explosion. Another explosion targeted a vehicle near a police station Kunduz city, leaving 4 dead and 18 injured. A mine planted explosion hit a van of the military in Khogiani killing four Taliban members and wounding a fifth. The roadside bomb wounded two children in the Niaz Beyk area of Kabul. Islamic State (ISIL) has claimed several attacks including the bombing of the Seh Dokan mosque.

== Background ==
After Doha Agreement between the US and the Taliban and seizure Afghanistan by Taliban, the rival Islamic State – Khorasan Province group attacks against Afghan minorities were reported to have surged in the country, including 2022 Kabul school bombing, 2021 Kabul school bombing. Most of the victims were Hazaras (Hazaras practice Shia Islam) who had been targeted by ISIL in Afghanistan since the Taliban came to power. The Taliban also target the Hazaras for violent persecution.

== Event ==
On April 21, 2022, several separate explosions shook different parts of Afghanistan. The first blast occurred at the biggest Shia Muslim mosque, known as Seh Dokan mosque in the Afghan city of Mazar-i-Sharif. the Sunni Islamic State which has claimed several attacks said: the explosion on the 2nd district inside of Seh Dokan mosque was carried out by booby-trapped bag while worshippers were praying in the mosque. Over 31 people were killed and another 87 were injured in the mosque explosion.

A roadside explosion blasted that targeted the minority Shia in the Niaz Beyk area of Kabul (in the same area 2022 Kabul school bombing) wounded two children.

Matiullah Rohani, Head of Information and Culture in Kunduz province reported Another explosion targeted a vehicle exploded near a police station in Kunduz, leaving 4 dead and 18 injured.

A night mine planted explosion hit a van of the military in Khogiani, a district in the eastern Nangarhar Province, killing four Taliban members and wounding a fifth.

Islamic State (ISIL) which has claimed several attacks, described the attacks as part of an ongoing global campaign to "avenge" the deaths of its former leader.

== See also ==
- List of terrorist attacks in Kabul
- Persecution of Hazara people
