= 2014 Paktika car bombing =

Suicide attack in a crowded bazaar

- Part of Taliban insurgency
- Location: Paktika, Afghanistan
- Date: July 15, 2014
- Attack type: car bomb
- Deaths: 89
- Injuries: +42
- Perpetrator: Haqqani network

On July 15, 2014, in Urgun, Afghanistan, a car bomb suicide attack took place in a crowded bazaar killing 89 people and injuring another 42. It was the bloodiest attack on civilians in Afghanistan since the 2008 Kandahar bombing.

== The Attack ==
At 10am police saw a suicide bomber driving a SUV into the center of Urgun, driving down the main road, the suicide bomber detonated his payload at 10:30am killing himself in the process. When he blew up the shockwave instantly destroyed 30 mainly mud and straw shops, dozens of vehicles, killing 89 people and wounding 42 more. The wounded and dead overwhelmed the nearby clinic and the military had to bring in helicopters and ambulances to transport casualties from the bomb site to Sharana, the Provincial capital. The Haqqani network was responsible for the attack having had planned it in the North Waziristan District of Pakistan.

== See also ==
- Taliban insurgency
- 2014 Yahya Khel suicide bombing (also in Paktika)
