= 2017 Herat bombing =

2017 Herat bombing may refer to:

- June 2017 Herat mosque bombing
- August 2017 Herat mosque attack
