= Kunduz mosque bombing =

Kunduz mosque bombing may refer to:

- 2021 Kunduz mosque bombing
- 2022 Kunduz mosque bombing
