= Mujib Rahman Ansari =

Afghan Islamic scholar (1982–2022)

Mawlawi Mujib Rahman Ansari
- مجیب‌الرحمن انصاری

Personal life
- Born: 1982 Herat, Afghanistan
- Died: 2 September 2022 (aged 39–40) Herat, Afghanistan
- Cause of death: Assassination

Religious life
- Religion: Islam
- Denomination: Sunni
- Jurisprudence: Hanafi

Mujib-ur-Rahman Ansari (Dari: مجیب‌الرحمن انصاری, romanized: Mujīb-ur-Rahmān Ansārī; 1982 – 2 September 2022) was an Afghan Islamic scholar who preached in the city of Herat. An ally of the Taliban, Ansari was a Hanafi preacher, and was a staunch opponent of the American-backed Afghan government. In the late 2010s, Ansari seized control of a district of Herat, where he established extrajudicial sharia courts and checkpoints operated by his armed enforcers. A Taliban official described Ansari as being Afghanistan's most popular religious scholar in 2022.

Ansari was assassinated in a suicide bombing on 2 September 2022. Though no group claimed responsibility, the Taliban government alleged that the Islamic State – Khorasan Province was responsible for the attack.

== Biography ==
Mujib-ur-Rahman Ansari was born in 1982 in the city of Herat in western Afghanistan. He said he was a descendent of Abdullah Ansari, an 11th-century Afghan saint. A follower of Sunni Islam, Ansari received his primary religious education at the Darul Uloom Ansar in Herat. After becoming a critic of the Afghan government in the early 1990s, he was pressured by the government to continue his studies in Saudi Arabia. After moving to Saudi Arabia, Ansari continued his religious education, where he was taught about Wahhabism, an ultraconservative movement of Sunni Islam. During this time, he also began publishing articles in the Persian language version of Wesal Haq TV.

After his return to Afghanistan, Ansari first became well known in the mid-2000s, following his criticism of Sayyid Muhammad Khairkhwah, the governor of Herat Province. However, his influence increased drastically after an incident in the early 2010s in which Ansari and his followers prevented a music concert from occurring in Herat by occupying the stadium venue. Ansari continued to build a following using his position as the imam of the Gozargah Mosque in northern Herat, and he also became one of the trustees of the Shrine of Khwaja Abd Allah. The several thousand parishioners who attended Ansari's mosque services had to undergo extensive body searches, and the compound was heavily guarded by security personnel armed with assault rifles and wearing white robes emblazoned with two crossed swords. However, Ansari stated that these enforcers were not a militia, but instead were just bodyguards. Ansari became very influential due to the dissemination of his sermons on Facebook, Instagram, and his personal radio station. Ansari used his influence to become a hardline critic of the Afghan republican government, saying that it was corrupt, un-Islamic, and an American puppet state.

In December 2019, Ansari and his followers seized control of the Gozargah district of Herat, preventing the police from entering and imposing sharia law, which was rigorously enforced. The district was described by The New York Times to have been Ansari's personal "fief". The governor of Herat Province, Abdul Wahid Qatali, stated that the government would not bother Ansari so long as he did not take up arms against the government or cause panic among the population. Ansari received a major victory in 2020, when the provincial government revived a version of the Ministry for the Propagation of Virtue and the Prevention of Vice; this had been a longtime goal for Ansari, as this office oversees punishments for violating sharia.

Although he was not officially affiliated with the Taliban during the republic, Ansari was considered to be a close ally of the organization, and shared many religious beliefs with the group. However, after the Taliban takeover of Afghanistan in September 2021, Ansari officially aligned with the organization and attended several of the new government's meetings, becoming "one of the important figures of this group in Herat". The new government also supplied Ansari with security personnel, weapons, and armored cars. In 2022, a Taliban official described Ansari as being Afghanistan's most popular religious scholar.

== Death ==
Ansari was assassinated on 2 September 2022 following a suicide bombing just outside of his mosque. Ansari had been returning to his mosque from a meeting with deputy prime minister Abdul Ghani Baradar when the bomber approached Ansari, kissed his hand, and then detonated, killing Ansari and several nearby people. The Taliban government officially stated that 18 people were killed in the attack, though Al Jazeera reported 28 fatalities and a local newspaper reported 48 fatalities. Those killed included Ansari's brother, as well as several parishioners and bodyguards. Though no group officially claimed responsibility for the attack, the Taliban government said that the Islamic State – Khorasan Province perpetrated the attack. Ansari was the fourth Taliban-aligned cleric to have been killed in the span of two months; another prominent cleric, Rahimullah Haqqani, had been killed a few weeks prior.

Ansari's assassination was heavily condemned by the Afghan government, with Taliban spokesman Zabiullah Mujahid and governor of Herat Province Noor Mohammad Islamjar stating that the Taliban would take revenge for his killing. The bombing was also condemned by former president Hamid Karzai and former chief executive Abdullah Abdullah, though neither mentioned Ansari in their statements. Others who offered condemnation include the United Nations Assistance Mission in Afghanistan, the Iranian Foreign Ministry, the Organisation of Islamic Cooperation, Pakistan, and Qatar. Some of Ansari's critics celebrated his death, such as Rahmatullah Nabil, the former director of the National Directorate of Security, who tweeted: "It is a proverb that a snake does not become a dragon until it eats a snake". However, another critic, Samira Hamidi of Amnesty International, stated that celebrating Ansari's death was wrong, as "his followers are alive".

== Views and influence ==
Ansari was considered to be a radical preacher, and was infamous for his hardline opinions and extremist views. Around 1,000 students studied under Ansari at his mosque.

After seizing control of the Gozargah district, Ansari began imposing his interpretation of sharia law. Contact between unmarried or unrelated men and women was banned; men who violated this were subject to beatings, while women were returned to their families for punishment. Couples were stopped at designated checkpoints operated by Ansari's enforcers, who forced the couples to show their marriage licenses. Music was also banned in the district. Ansari held extrajudicial tribunals enforcing his extreme interpretation of sharia, circumventing the Afghan legal system. In one speech, Ansari stated that he would administer hudud to anyone arrested at a checkpoint for adultery, theft, or the consumption of alcohol. He also suggested "stoning accused adulterers and chopping off the hands of thieves". Tariq Nabi, an Islamic scholar, stated that Ansari had "created a worrisome parallel government" in northern Herat based on Wahhabism, and that he was fueling ethnic and religious tensions.

Ansari became well known for his outspoken misogyny. Ansari was opposed to the "presence of women outside the house under any pretext", and he barred women from attending his press conferences. In one speech, Ansari stated that "most women go to hell", and in another, he stated his belief that most women are from hell. Ansari stated that any man whose wife does not fully cover herself is a coward, stating that "a woman's bad hijab is due to a man's lack of zeal". However, despite these beliefs, Ansari was a supporter of women and girls receiving education at schools and universities, though segregated from male students.

An ally of the Taliban, Ansari was described as a "thorn in the side of the pro-western government in Afghanistan". Ansari was a prominent hardline critic of the Afghan republican government, stating that it was corrupt and merely a puppet regime of the Americans forces, and he was a staunch opponent of foreign soldiers in Afghanistan. In February 2021, Ansari stated that anyone who supported the government of Afghanistan was committing sin, and that "those who support the government are worse than Jews". Ansari frequently called the Ghani-led government corrupt and rebellious, and encouraged his followers to not support the "Afghan regime". Though a staunch critic of the government, Ansari was not opposed to the republican system itself; instead of directly attacking the government, Ansari opposed its officials and indirectly called the government "un-Islamic". For example, in one speech, Ansari stated that the government had "no smell of Islam". Ansari justified this by stating, "Emirate or caliphate, we want an Islamic system. It is under any name. It is a republic, an emirate or a caliphate. We want an Islamic system... The system of the Islamic Republic of Afghanistan adheres to Islamic principles. We are its servants". He also criticized the Taliban for conducting suicide attacks. Ansari was also a critic of the government of Tajikistan due to their creation of "religious restrictions".

Despite his infamy, Ansari was very influential in Herat, with newspaper 8am.af writing:

Ansari has become a pole of local power in Herat. Among all those who run for the House of Representatives or the Provincial Council, almost the absolute majority of them turn to Mr. Ansari in order to receive prayers and inwardly to attract Mr. Ansari's support. The candidates then publish pictures of their meeting with Mr. Ansari on social networks to attract people. In addition to these, the high-ranking officials who are appointed in Herat's civil and military institutions, go to Mr. Ansari, who is also the head of the Ulema Council of Western Afghanistan, to ask for permission to pray or to recite a narration before taking up their duties.

After the Taliban retook control of Afghanistan in 2021, Ansari stated that the new government should begin issuing fatwas against its opponents. While at a religious gathering in Kabul in July 2022, Ansari stated that people who commit "the smallest act against our Islamic government" should be beheaded. Ansari was also a critic of the Islamic State. Though he was accused by Qatali of spreading pro-Islamic State propaganda in 2021, Ansari later stated in an interview that "anyone who acts against the religion of Islam is rejected, and anyone who serves Islam, the nation, and the country is an endorsement of Islam".

Ansari was also anti-Shia, and he had also been called a takfiri due to his opposition to the convergence of religions. Ansari strongly criticized Sunni children who attended Shia schools. He also called Shiites "scumbags" and "rawafid" on a radio program, and stated that the Afghan government should not allow Shiites to hold political or bureaucratic offices. He also stated that the celebration of Nowruz is akin to "worshiping fire". In addition to his anti-Shia rhetoric, Ansari also campaigned against non-Muslims in general. During an interview with The New York Times, Ansari attempted to convert one of the American journalists to Islam; upon being rebuffed, Ansari said that the journalist would "burn in hell". Ansari had also stated that COVID-19 "was sent by God to punish non-Muslims", and insisted that Muslims continue to attend mosques, despite the risk posed by COVID-19. Following a Friday service in which thousands of parishioners attended, Ferozuddin Feroz, the Afghan Minister of Health, stated that Ansari was "not a scholar but a murderer".
