= Forward Operating Base Delhi massacre =

2012 mass shooting at a United States Marine Corps base in Afghanistan

Forward Operating Base Delhi Massacre
- Garmsir (FOB) (Afghanistan)
- Location: Garmsir District, Helmand Province, Afghanistan
- Date: August 10, 2012
- Target: U.S. Marines
- Attack type: Mass shooting
- Weapon: AK-47
- Deaths: 3
- Injuries: 1
- Perpetrator: Chai Boy of Afghan District Police Chief Sarwar Jan

Forward Operating Base Delhi massacre are murders that occurred on August 10, 2012, at the Forward Operating Base Delhi within Garmsir village, Helmand Province, Afghanistan. A young man, who had been allowed to live on the base, killed three unarmed U.S. Marines; one Marine was also severely injured.

== Incident ==
The local police chief's tea boy (victim of the Afghan practise of bacha bazi) Aynoddin, stole an AK-47 from an unlocked barracks. Aynoddin entered the gym and fired from the AK-47 at eight marines until he was out of ammunition. As Aynoddin left the gym he stated to Afghan police officers "I just did jihad. Don't you want to do jihad, too? If not, I will kill you." Aynoddin was not arrested after the Afghan Police disarmed him.

== Investigation ==
Aynoddin was identified as the gunman by the other Afghan police officers present and the Taliban took responsibility. Naval Criminal Investigative Service has been conducting an investigation since the incident occurred. The United States Attorney's Office in New York is currently investigating NCIS' case. United States Congressman from New York Peter King has written letters to NCIS' director Mark Clookie and the USMC Commandant Gen. James F. Amos asking the status of the investigation.

== See also ==
- List of massacres in Afghanistan
