= 2022 Mazar-i-Sharif mosque bombing =

2022 bombing in Afghanistan

- Part of the persecution of Shias by the Islamic State and the Islamic State–Taliban conflict
- 2022 Mazar-i-Sharif mosque bombing (Afghanistan)
- Location: 36°42′43″N 67°06′35″E; Mazar-i-Sharif, Balkh Province, Afghanistan
- Date: 21 April 2022; 11:55 (AFT (UTC+04:30))
- Target: Shias
- Weapon: Improvised explosive device
- Deaths: 31
- Injuries: 87
- Perpetrator: Islamic State – Khorasan Province

On 21 April 2022, a powerful bomb rocked the Shia Seh Dokan mosque in Mazar-i-Sharif, Balkh Province, Afghanistan, killing at least 31 people and injuring more than 87 others. The Islamic State – Khorasan Province claimed responsibility via Telegram.

Worshippers were offering the Zuhr prayer inside the mosque when the bomb exploded. Authorities counted 31 dead and at least 87 injured, six of whom were wounded critically.

The bombing was part of a series of attacks on the same day, including two explosions targeting Taliban officers in Kunduz and Khogyani District and a bombing that injured two Shia children in Kabul.

== Background ==
The Islamic State said the attack on the Mazar-e-Sharif mosque was carried out using a remote-controlled booby-trapped bag when the building was packed with worshipers. The group called the attack part of its ongoing global campaign to "avenge" the deaths of its former leader and spokesman.

Afghanistan had seen a sharp rise in bombings since the Taliban came to power. Earlier, a bomb blast rocked a high school in the Shiite-populated area of Dasht-e-Barchi, several kilometers from Kabul.

== Reactions ==
- Pakistani Prime Minister Shahbaz Sharif strongly condemned the bomb blast in the mosque in Mazar-e-Sharif and conveyed his heartfelt condolences and sympathy to the government and people of Afghanistan.
- The embassy of the Islamic Republic of Iran offered condolences to the families of the dead and prayed for speedy recovery of the injured. A statement issued by the Iranian embassy in Kabul said that "once again the blood of Muslim and fasting people of Afghanistan was shed during the holy month of Ramadan by the criminal and unclean hands of terrorists".
- UN special envoy Richard Bennett called the attacks on the Hazara community "systematic" and called for "immediate investigation, accountability and an end to such human rights abuses."
- Hezbollah and the Taliban have also condemned the terrorist attack in Afghanistan.

== See also ==
- List of terrorist incidents linked to Islamic State – Khorasan Province
- Terrorist incidents in Afghanistan in 2022
- April 2022 Kabul school bombing
- September 2022 Kabul school bombing
- 2022 Kunduz mosque bombing
- 28 April 2022 Mazar-i-Sharif bombings
