= 2022 Mazar-i-Sharif minivan bombings =

2022 bombings in Afghanistan

Mazar-i-Sharif minivan bombings
- Location: Mazar-i-Sharif, Balkh Province, Afghanistan
- Date: 25 May 2022
- Target: civilians
- Attack type: vehicle bombing
- Deaths: 9
- Injuries: 15

Mazar-i-Sharif (Afghanistan)

On 25 May 2022, three explosions hit a group of minivans in the Afghan city of Mazar-i-Sharif, Balkh Province. 9 people were killed and 15 others wounded.

Taliban authorities said that the terrorists responsible had placed IEDs inside the vehicles. All the victims were from the country's minority Shia Muslims, according to a police official.

The Islamic State – Khorasan Province claimed responsibility via the Amaq News Agency.

== See also ==
- 2022 in Afghanistan
- 2022 Mazar-i-Sharif mosque bombing
- 28 April 2022 Mazar-i-Sharif bombings
- May 2022 Kabul mosque bombing, which happened the same day
- Terrorist incidents in Afghanistan in 2022
