= 2015 Jalalabad suicide bombing =

April 2015 event in Afghanistan

- Location of Nangarhar Province in Afghanistan
- Location: Jalalabad, Nangarhar Province, Afghanistan
- Date: 18 April 2015
- Target: Bank
- Attack type: Motorcycle suicide bombing
- Deaths: 33
- Injuries: 100
- Perpetrator: Islamic State - Khorasan Province

The 2015 Jalalabad suicide bombing occurred on 18 April 2015. A suicide bomber on a motorcycle, allegedly affiliated with ISIL's Khorasan Province, struck a bank in the city of Jalalabad in Nangarhar Province, Afghanistan, killing at least 33 people and injuring another 100. It marked the first major attack by ISIL Khorasan after it was formed three months earlier, in January 2015.

== See also ==
- List of massacres in Afghanistan
- List of terrorist incidents linked to Islamic State – Khorasan Province
