= 2022 Aybak bombing =

2022 bombing in Afghanistan

- Location: Aybak, Samangan Province, Afghanistan
- Date: 30 November 2022
- Target: civilians
- Attack type: bombing
- Deaths: 17
- Injuries: 26

Aybak (Afghanistan)

On November 30, 2022, a bombing of a madrasa in Aybak, Samangan Province, Afghanistan killed 17 people and injured 26 others. The majority of those killed were children who studied at the religious seminary that was targeted. No group claimed responsibility.

== See also ==
- Terrorist incidents in Afghanistan in 2022
- September 2022 Kabul school bombing
