= August 2018 Gardez mosque attack =

Attack against Shiites in Afghanistan

2018 Gardez Mosque Attack
- Part of War in Afghanistan (2001–2021)
- Location: 33°36′11″N 69°13′19″E; Gardez, Afghanistan
- Date: 3 August 2018
- Target: Shiites
- Attack type: Suicide bombing, shooting
- Weapons: Explosive belts, assault rifles
- Deaths: 48 (including two perpetrators)
- Injuries: 70+
- Perpetrator: Islamic State – Khorasan Province
- No. of participants: 2
- Motive: Islamic terrorism

On 3 August 2018, a suicide attack was carried out by two members of the Islamic State terrorist group at a Shiite mosque in Gardez, eastern Afghanistan. The attack left 48 dead, including three children, and more than 70 injured.

== The attack ==
During Salat prayer on Friday, 3 August 2018, two members of the Islamic State clad in burqas burst into the Shia mosque of Gardez. There they opened fire on the worshippers before activating their explosive vests.

== Aftermath ==
An initial report on the day of the attack gave a total of 29 dead and 81 injured. A new count the next day reported 35 dead, including 3 children, and 94 injured. 17 people were evacuated by helicopter to Kabul.

== Responsibility ==
The Taliban rapidly denied all responsibility for the attack. The Islamic State, through its agency Amaq, claimed responsibility during a message on the evening of August 4.
