= 2008 Kandahar bombing =

Terrorist attack in Afghanistan

Coordinates: 31.616°N 65.716°E

- Kandahar (Afghanistan)
- Location: Kandahar, Afghanistan
- Date: February 17, 2008
- Attack type: Suicide attack
- Deaths: 100
- Injuries: 100
- Perpetrators: Taliban, Islamic Party of Mullah Gulbuddin Hekmatyar, or independent jihadists (all suspected)

The 2008 Kandahar bombing of February 17, 2008 in Kandahar, Afghanistan, was an attack targeting a crowd of people watching a dog-fighting competition. With more than 100 killed, it was the deadliest attack on Afghan soil since 2001.

The target of the attack was believed to have been a local police commander who was killed in the blast, Abdul Hakim Jan. He was reported to be known in the area for the strong stand he took against Taliban forces. "He was a big wall for us; no one else can take his place," Ahmedullah, a 50-year-old farmer in the neighboring Arghandab District. "Now I guess that Arghandab can become a station of the Taliban. They were scared of our commander Abdul Hakim. Now we don't have any other person like him in the whole district."

Kandahar Gov. Asadullah Khalid said he'd tried to warn the police commander away from the event, saying he, the Governor, had known there were bombers active in the area.

"A Taliban spokesman calling himself Qari Yousuf Ahmadi told Canwest News Service that his group did not co-ordinate the first [Kandahar] suicide strike, but took responsibility for" a second the next day in Spin Boldak.

== See also ==
- List of massacres in Afghanistan
