= 2022 Kabul hotel attack =

Shooting and bombing attack by Islamic State in Afghanistan

- Part of the Islamic State–Taliban conflict
- Location: 34.535166°N 69.165335°E; Longan Hotel, Kabul, Afghanistan
- Date: 12 December 2022; 14:30 (AFT)
- Target: Foreigners
- Attack type: Bombing, gun attack, and arson
- Weapons: 9×18mm Makarov pistols F-1 grenades Plastic explosive
- Deaths: 3–6 (including 1–3 assailants)
- Injuries: 18
- Victims: Afghan and foreign civilians, Taliban soldiers
- Perpetrator: Islamic State – Khorasan Province
- Defender: Afghanistan
- Motive: Opposition to Taliban cooperation with China

On 12 December 2022, insurgents attacked the Kabul Longan Hotel in Kabul, Afghanistan. At least 3 civilians were killed and 18 others, including foreigners, were reported to be injured. Islamic State – Khorasan Province claimed responsibility for the attack.

== Background ==
The Islamic State–Taliban conflict began in 2015; since then they have often attacked Kabul. In September 2022, a suicide bomber blew himself up outside the Russian Embassy in Kabul, killing two Russian diplomats. In early December, gunmen attacked the Pakistani ambassador at his embassy compound in Kabul, wounding a Pakistani guard. On 11 December, Chinese ambassador to Afghanistan Wang Yu met Afghan Deputy Foreign minister Sher Mohammad Abbas Stanikzai to discuss security matters, and called on the Taliban "to pay more attention to the security of the Chinese Embassy in Kabul."

The Kabul Longan Hotel is situated in the affluent Shahr-e Naw neighbourhood, a few hundred metres northwest of Shahr-e Naw Park. The area is home to many of Kabul's foreign residents, with the hotel being in close proximity to several embassies. The hotel, frequented primarily by foreigners, is under Chinese ownership and staffed by both Chinese and Afghan employees.

== Attack ==
On 12 December 2022, at 14:30 local time, two explosions occurred on the upper floors of the hotel, followed by gunfire from two or three attackers. Videos also recorded a number of smaller explosions, with one witnesses placing the initial attack site on the eighth and ninth floor, with the entire attack lasting around an hour. At least four people escaped the upper floors through windows, including one of the attackers.

== Victims ==
Three people were killed and 18 injured. According to Taliban spokesman Zabiullah Mojahid, none of the dead were foreigners, but that two foreign nationals were slightly injured from falls as they attempted to escape through windows. Chinese Foreign Ministry spokesperson Zhao Lijian said that five Chinese nationals were seriously injured. Yu Ming Hui, head of Kabul's China Town business complex, stated that another 13 or 14 Chinese nationals were "superficially wounded".

While most sources, including the Taliban government, reported three killed attackers, ISIS–K stated that there were two attackers, one of whom survived, also claiming "the killing and wounding of 30 infidels and apostates". The Emergency-operated Surgical Centre Kabul reported a total of 21 casualties, including three dead on arrival. The identities of the fatalities were withheld and while reports of three fatalities are consistent, AFP reported that it was not confirmed whether the three reported dead were the attackers or civilians. CNN claimed that "an emergency non-profit" described the three fatalities received in hospital as "separate from the attackers".

== Responsibility ==
On 13 December 2022, jihadist group Islamic State-Khorasan Province claimed responsibility for the attack in a Telegram post through two "inghimassis". The IS statement claimed the hotel was attacked because the hotel is frequented by diplomats and is owned by "communist China". The Islamic State has a history of opposition to the Chinese government in relation to the government's persecution of Uyghurs, and has been critical of the Taliban for its willingness to cooperate with China. The statement claimed the attackers detonated pre-planted explosives and set fire to the building.

On 14 December, an IS-K Twitter account posted images and videos taking inside the hotel before the attack, showing Chinese guests in the hotel's restaurant as well as women without hijab and wearing trousers, criticising the Taliban for allowing "obscenity and revelry of the infidels under [the] self-proclaimed Islamic government", accusing the Taliban of apostasy.

On 16 December, the IS magazine Al-Naba claimed that the attackers entered by renting a room with false identity cards and smuggled the weapons inside with "specific tricks", which was interpreted as either referring to lax hotel security or a third co-conspirator within hotel staff. The two attackers took pictures inside their hotel room posing with an Islamic State flag, several explosives, and two handguns while pledging

One of the attackers died during the attack while the second attacker, a Tajik national, managed to escape by scaling down the side of the hotel. This same Tajik IS member would later carry out the 1 January 2023, suicide bombing at Kabul Airport.

In January 2023, the Afghan government launched a number of raids on IS-K hideouts in the country. Eight IS members were killed and seven arrested, with Taliban spokesperson Zabiullah Mujahid identifying them as having a "main role" in both the hotel attack and the flow of foreign Islamic State fighters into Afghanistan.

== See also ==
- List of terrorist incidents linked to Islamic State – Khorasan Province
- List of terrorist attacks in Kabul
- List of massacres in Afghanistan
