= Battle of Herat (1270) =

1270 battle of the Kaidu–Kublai war

- Part of the Kaidu–Kublai war
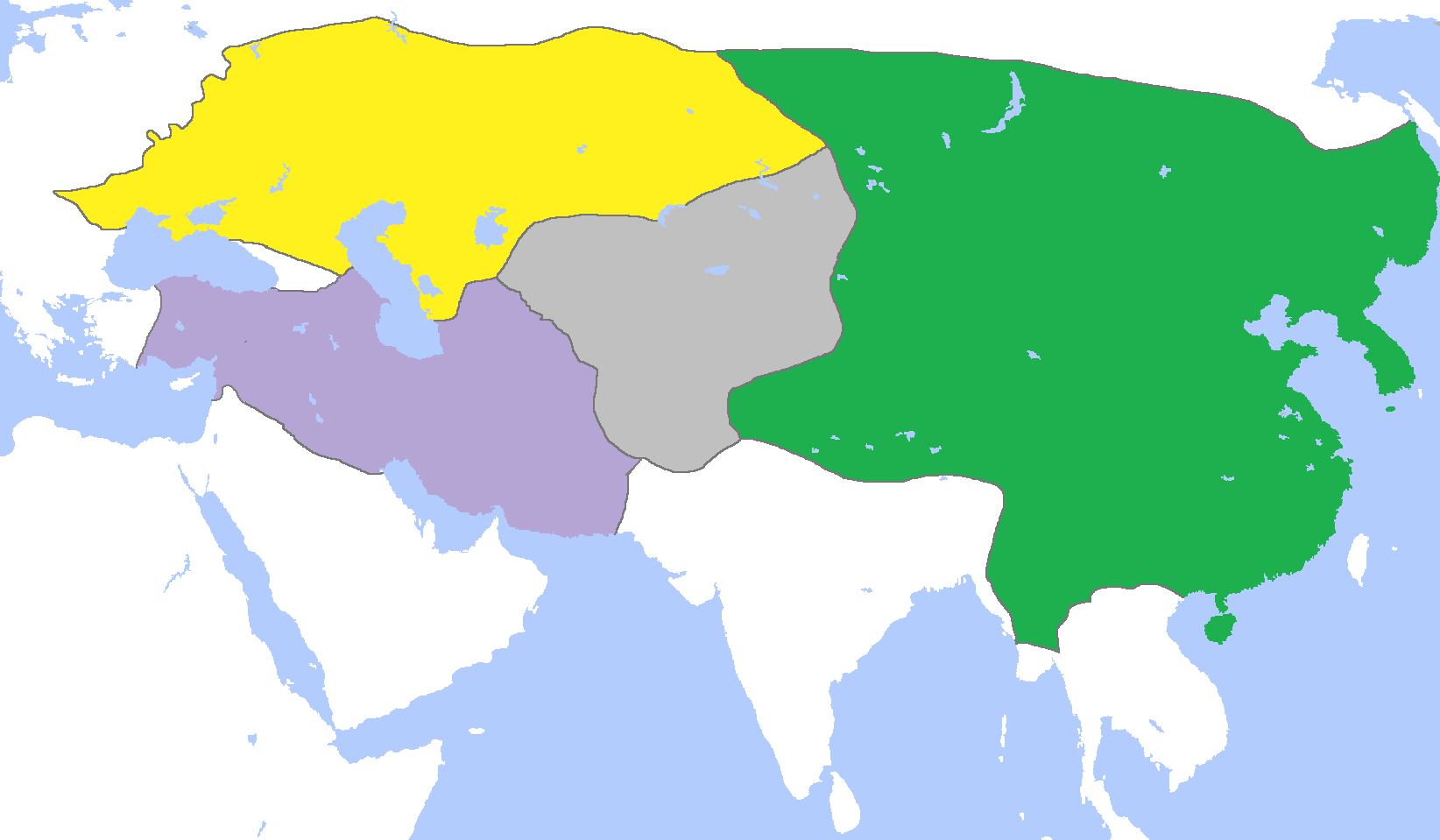
- Division of the Mongol Empire, c. 1300, with the Chagatai Khanate in gray and Ilkhanate in purple.
Date	22 July 1270
Location	Ghurian, Ilkhanate (modern-day Afghanistan)
Result	Ilkhanate victory

Belligerents
Ilkhanate	Chagatai Khanate

Commanders and leaders
Abaqa Khan; Yoshmut; Arghun Aqa; Samaghar	Ghiyas-ud-din Baraq (WIA); Marghaul †

Strength
50,000–100,000	90,000–150,000

Casualties and losses
5,000 killed	40,000 killed

The Battle of Herat was fought between the Ilkhanid forces of Abaqa Khan and the invading Chagatai forces of Ghiyas-ud-din Baraq on 22 July 1270. The battle marked the climax of a broader power struggle within the fractured Mongol Empire, as former allies and competing ulus contended for supremacy in the aftermath of the Toluid Revolution and the succession crisis. Despite initial successes for the Chagatai forces in Khorasan, they were met with a crushing defeat at Herat by Abaqa Khan, who then retaliated by invading Bukhara but later retreated, securing the Ilkhanid-Chagatai border.

== Background ==
The Mongol Empire, founded by Genghis Khan in 1206, rapidly expanded to become the largest contiguous land empire in history, encompassing vast parts of Asia, the Middle East, and Eastern Europe. It was divided into semi-autonomous uluses ruled by his descendants, including the Ögedeids, Chagataids, and Toluids. The Toluid Revolution of the 1250s under Möngke Khan and with the support of Batu of the Golden Horde was a definitive internal shift in authority, terminating Ögedeid dominance and elevating the Toluid line to paramount power. Mongol military success relied on mobile cavalry, composite bows, lamellar armor, disciplined formations, sophisticated communication systems, siege engineers, gunpowder weapons, and psychological warfare, enabling successful management of a multicultural empire.

=== Origin of the conflict ===
The origin of the conflict was the Toluid Revolution of 1251, by which Möngke Khan became the Great Khan (Qagan), effectively sidelining the Ögedeids, who were the descendants of Ögedei Khan. This development weakened the Chaghadaids, who were allies of the Ögedeids, and paved the way for the eventual dissolution of the Ögedeid ulus (state). The Jochids of the Golden Horde, who had backed Möngke's ascent, utilized the Chaghadaids weakness to take over Transoxania and Western Turkestan.

Following Möngke's death in 1259, the empire descended into a civil war between his brothers, Kublai Khan and Ariq Böke, the Toluid Civil War. This further weakened the empire, and regional powers such as the Chaghadaids and Ögedeids were able to reassert their independence. Alghu, the khan of the Chaghadaids, used the Golden Horde's preoccupation with the Ilkhanate to retake lost Chaghadaid territory, including Samarkand and Bukhara.

=== Rise of Baraq and Kaidu ===
After Alghu's death in 1265 or 1266, Baraq, a Chaghadaid prince, became the paramount ruler in Central Asia. Although Baraq was initially allied with Kublai Khan and was granted control over the Chagatai ulus, he later asserted his independence. His ascendance came after the re-emergence of Kaidu, a grandson of Ögedei Khan, who attempted to re-establish the Ögedeid ulus and contest both Kublai and the Chagatai for supremacy in Central Asia.

Map of Transoxiana

Baraq and Kaidu engaged in numerous battles, with Kaidu being assisted by the Golden Horde. Following a series of battles, which included a total defeat of Baraq close to Khojand, the two factions concluded a temporary peace agreement. In 1269, they convened a quriltai (princes assembly) in the town of Talas, Qaidu and Baraq came to an understanding on the grounds of their common ancestry as descendants of Chinggis Khan. Baraq contended that the Chaghadaids were rightfully entitled to their proportionate share of land and resources, and this resulted in the division of Transoxania's revenues two-thirds to Baraq and one-third to Qaidu and Mongke Temur. The princes consented to reside in mountains and plains instead of cities, not to impose additional burdens on their subjects, and not to allow cattle to graze on cultivated lands. Masud Beg, the son of Mahmud Yalavach, was placed in charge of the sedentary lands to resuscitate the region. Seasonal grazing lands were awarded to Baraq's army, and Qaidu and Baraq shared Samarkand and Bukhara's military units and artisan workshops, including those making arms. According to the terms of the treaty, Qaidu stationed troops near Bukhara in an attempt to block Baraq's approach, supposedly in return for his battlefield victory over Baraq.

Baraq, dissatisfied with the portion of territory allocated to him and unable to expand eastward or northward due to Kaidu's presence, subsequently redirected his attention toward the west. Baraq proposed a campaign for the invasion of Khorasan, a region under the dominion of the Ilkhanate, ruled by Abaqa Khan to Kaidu. Baraq legitimized his expedition on the grounds that the Ilkhans had acquired these lands by conquest, and not by right of inheritance. Kaidu, seeing an opportunity to weaken both Baraq and the Ilkhanate, supported the campaign, believing that it would improve his own position regardless of the outcome.

== Baraq's invasion of Khorasan ==
Baraq sent Masud Beg to the Ilkhanate in 1268 under the pretext of diplomacy, but in reality to gather intelligence. Simultaneously, Baraq negotiated with the Chagataid prince Tegüder, promising him sovereignty over Khorasan and Mazandaran in exchange for support. Upon learning of Tegüder's betrayal about his unauthorized attempt to defect to Baraq and stir a rebellion. Abaqa Khan launched a campaign to punish him in Georgia where Tegüder's fief was located. Abaqa successfully defeated and captured Tegüder before Baraq could mount a response.

Baraq's campaign started with the conquest of Afghanistan, a province he claimed due to the death of his grandfather Mutukan during the Siege of Bamyan in 1221. He first succeeded in the vicinity of Herat, defeating Tübshin, brother of Abaqa and governor of Khorasan. By May 1270, Baraq had taken over much of the province, sacked Nishapur a historic Persian city, and made Shams al-Dīn Kart, the ruler of Herat and a Kartid vassal of the Ilkhanids, submit and pay tribute.

Baraq marched towards Maruchaq, midway between Balkh and Herat, where he met Tubshin and Arghun Aqa, the governor of Khorasan. After a short battle the Ilkhanid forces were defeated. Tübshin retreated to Mazandaran, informing Abaqa of the situation. This victory was followed by internal disagreements among Baraq's forces. Qipchaq, one of the commanders of Kaidu's contingent, quarreled with Baraq's general Jalayirtai and took this as a reason for withdrawal. All attempts to intercept him failed, and Qipchaq returned to Kaidu, witnessing the rapid desertions in the allied army, Chabat, a grandson of Güyük Khan, found a pretext and withdrew but lost the greater part of his army in a skirmish with Baraq's son during the withdrawal.

Baraq complained to Kaidu about his troops deserting him, but Kaidu paid no attention to his protest and instead notified Abaqa of Qipchaq's return. This prompted a diplomatic shift, and Abaqa and Kaidu forged an alliance, calling each other "ortogh" (ally, friend). The desertion of Kaidu's army weakened Baraq's forces and gave Abaqa the time to prepare for a counterattack.

=== Abaqa's march to Herat ===
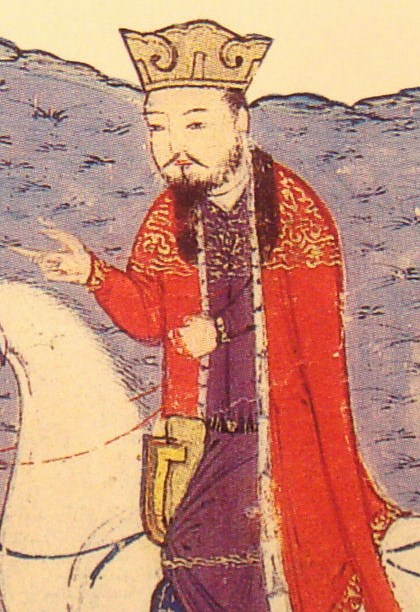
Abaqa Khan

Abaqa Khan made large-scale preparations to meet the Chagatai invasion. He ordered his grand minister to manufacture arms, such as arrows, bows, and lances, and issued orders to his generals to mobilize their troops, including auxiliary forces. He also called upon his brother Yoshmut, who was stationed as a frontier commander on the border of the Golden Horde, to join him with 10,000 troops. According to the Ilkhanid court historian Wassaf, Yoshmut had already clashed several times with Baraq's army while assisting Tübshin, and had endured significant losses. Abaqa departed from Azerbaijan on April 27, 1270, advancing northwest through Mughan, Ardabil, and Sharuyaz. Along the way, he encountered a messenger from Kublai Khan, who had previously been captured by Baraq but managed to escape and reported that Baraq's troops were frequently intoxicated and that their horses were in poor condition. Encouraged by this intelligence, Abaqa pressed forward.

His army marched via Rayy and Qumis, where it was joined by Tübshin and Arghun Aqa's forces, along with reinforcements from Kirman and Yazd. In the vicinity of Herat, they were joined by a Georgian contingent, owing to their vassalage to the Ilkhanate. During the campaign, Abaqa Khan maintained strict secrecy regarding his presence in the army because he was alarmed for being assassinated by Chagatais, enforcing this confidentiality by ordering the execution of anyone who revealed information about his movements. This was successful, and Baraq was unaware of Abaqa's approach until shortly before the battle.

== Battle ==
After a 55-day march from Mughan, Abaqa's forces were just five days away from Baraq's army. To maintain stealth, Abaqa ordered his troops to carry pre-cooked supplies to avoid lighting fires. Additionally, 10% of his cavalry around 5,000 men, including Georgian auxiliaries under King David were sent ahead under Abatai and Shiktur to scout the Chagatai's movements. They were ordered to kill any Chagatai soldiers they met, which they did until they ran into Baraq's vanguard and annihilated it in a dawn ambush. When they returned, they reported that Baraq's main army was just a day's march away. Abaqa then divided his troops into three corps right, left, and center and sent Tübshin to fight Margha'ul, Baraq's vanguard leader, close to Chaghcharan on the Herat River. Tübshin defeated Margha'ul's 3,000 men and recovered the looted booty from Khorasan. Margha'ul was, however, able to escape and informed Baraq, who withdrew his troops in response.

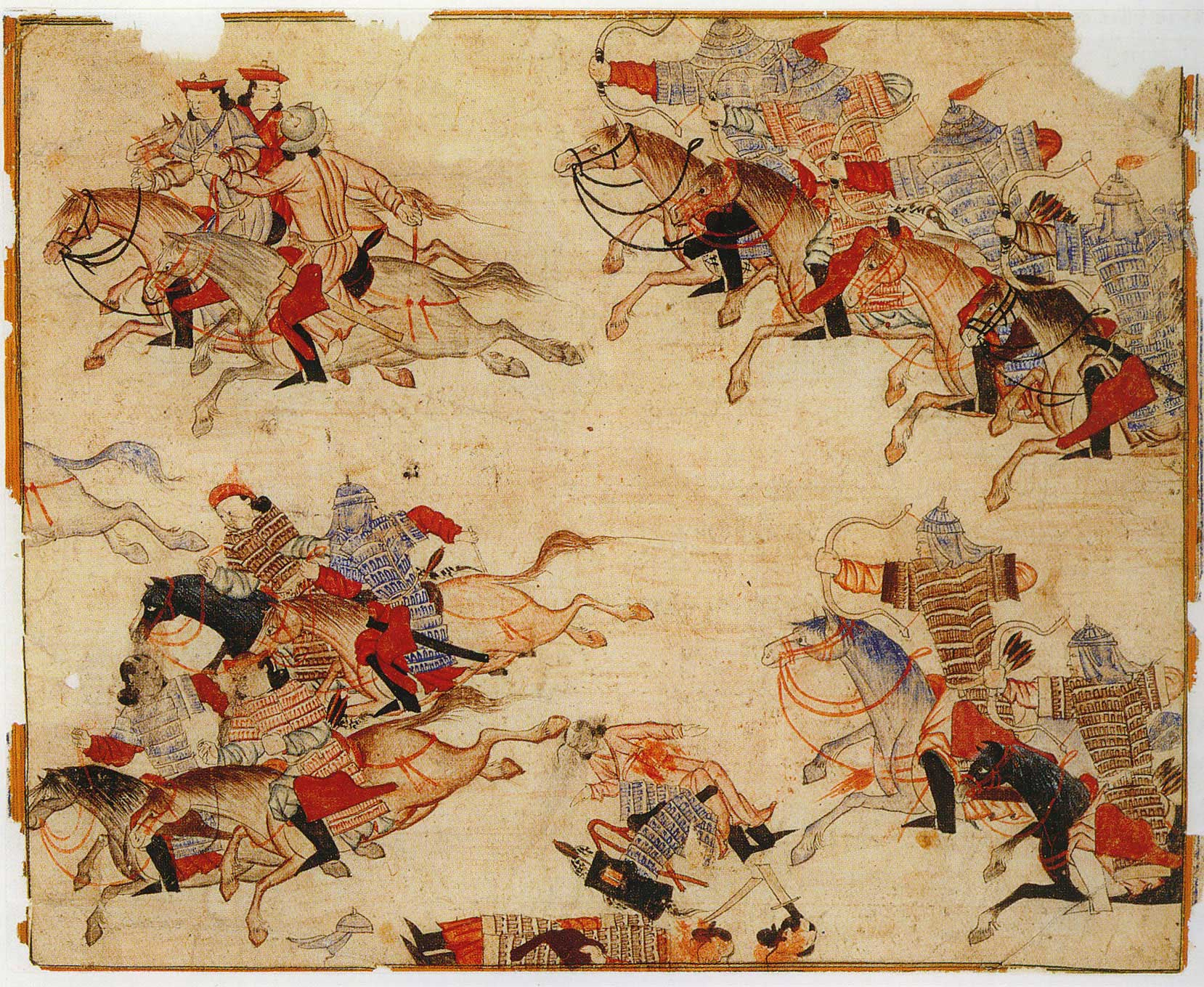
Mounted warriors pursue enemies. Illustration of Rashid-ad-Din's Jami' al-tawarikh.

As Abaqa marched towards Herat, he deployed his commanders to choose the battlefield, for he expected that Baraq would not accept peaceful negotiations. In the meantime, his army caught Baraq's spies. Abaqa did not execute them at once but used them for deception. Abaqa feigned a situation where one of his trusted soldiers openly informed him that the Golden Horde had invaded Ilkhanid lands and that Abaqa announced that he intended to retreat. Two of the spies were shortly executed, and one was permitted to flee in order to spread the false information. Abaqa then moved his army to the Jina (Khanbeh) plain, the prearranged battlefield. In the meantime, news arrived for Baraq that Abaqa had withdrawn, so he moved forward to attack. The Mamluk sources add that this misinformation was also propagated by a defector from Baraq's army who had joined Abaqa and promised him victory through augury. Abaqa rewarded the defector and ordered him to spread the false information of his withdrawal, thereby enticing Baraq to give battle.

On July 22, 1270, the Battle of Herat took place near the Qara Su River. Despite initial hesitation, Baraq was persuaded by his generals to engage in battle, despite significant disadvantages, including Abaqa's control of the battlefield, the poor condition of Baraq's horses, and the Ilkhanid forces cutting off Chagatai access to water. Abaqa split his army into three parts. Tübshin and Hindu Noyan commanded the right wing, with other commanders such as Samaghar, Shiktur, and Arghun Aqa. The left wing, under Yoshmut, was supported by Kirmanid and Yazd contingents and Sonitai, Buriltai, and Abdallah Aqa. Abatai Noyan and other officers commanded the center, with Abaqa in attendance but staying back for his safety.

The battle began with Baraq's forces launching a barrage of arrows, followed by an assault led by Margha'ul, who caused heavy damage before being killed by an arrow. His death weakened Baraq's army, but Jalayirtai took command and launched a counterattack with 4,000 cavalry, breaking through the Ilkhanid left flank. At one point, Abaqa considered retreating, but his veteran commander Sonitai rallied the troops and urged them to continue fighting. Abaqa himself directed a counterattack, organizing the redeployment of Yoshmut and commanding repeated attacks. The Ilkhanid army surrounded Jalayirtai, causing his army to disperse. As the battle was turning against him, Baraq joined the battle himself, but after being thrown from his horse and injured, he had to flee. Baraq fled back to Bukhara, ending the battle in a decisive victory for the Ilkhanids.

== Aftermath ==
The defeat of Baraq at Herat marked the collapse of his reign. He retreated to Bukhara, where he was struck by paralysis and had to be borne in a litter. His army started breaking up, as some of the commanders defected to Abaqa, while two of the princes tried to escape east. Baraq sent faithful followers after them and sent his brother, Basar, to request Kaidu's assistance, attributing his defeat to Qipchaq and Chabat's desertion. But Kaidu imprisoned Basar but promised Baraq that he would send an army.

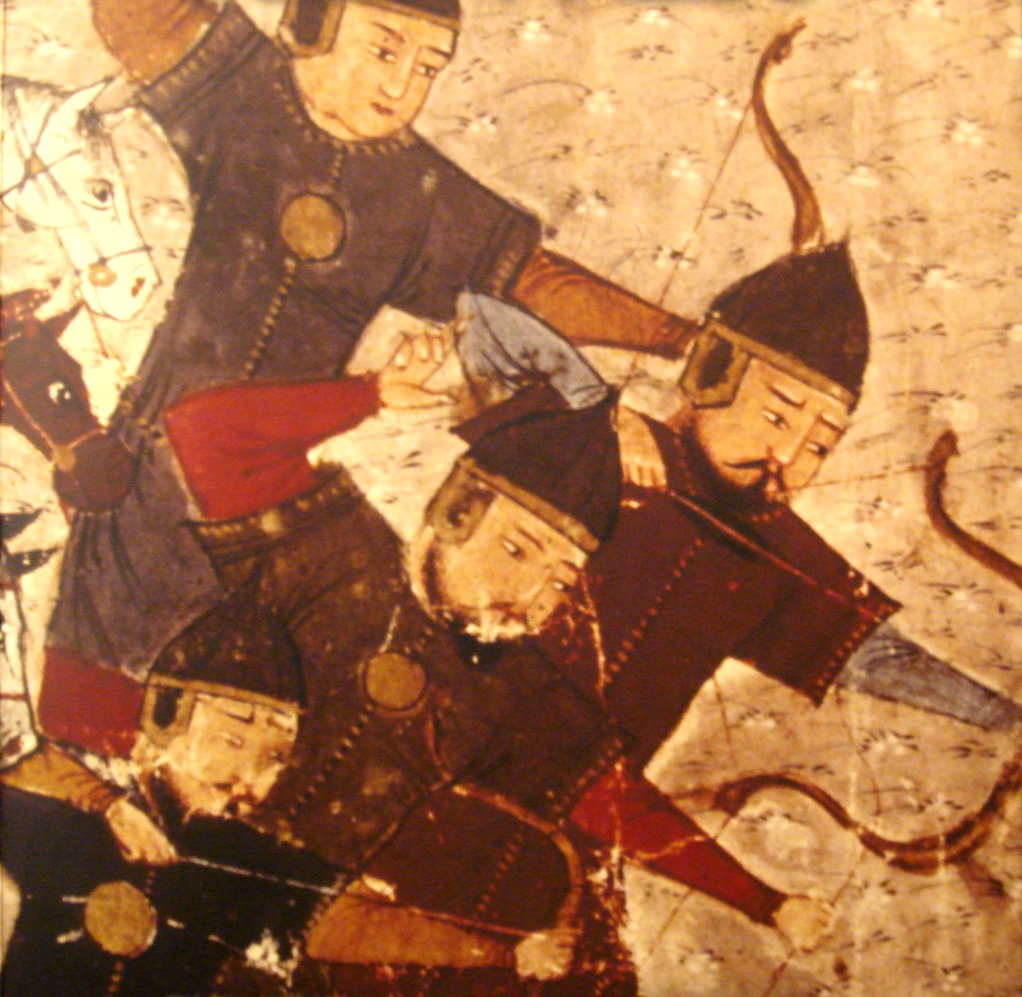
Mongol soldiers by Rashid al-Din.

In place of this, Kaidu marched 20,000 men west to take advantage of Chagataid weakness and to forestall Baraq from obtaining the assistance of Kublai Khan. By the time Baraq had received news of Kaidu's advance, his own men had taken captive the fugitive princes. Baraq sought to deter Kaidu, but soon his camp was encircled. On the following morning, Baraq was dead, and the majority of his 30,000 men surrendered to Kaidu, who granted them pasturelands and portions of his treasury. Baraq died in August 1271, and within a month, Kaidu was crowned khan at Talas.

Meanwhile, Abaqa Khan crossed the Amu Darya river, invaded the Chaghatai territory and sacked Bukhara. Abaqa's men destroyed and pillaged the city for a week, turning it to ashes, even though they did not discover any Chagatai or Ögedeid troops there. However, Abaqa's forces left Bukhara after this week. The Oxus continued to be the Ilkhanids' eastern frontier, and they made no attempt to extend beyond it despite their triumph. Abaqa's triumph placed Ilkhanid control on Khorasan, providing stability along his eastern border for the rest of his reign. Although later the Ilkhanids experienced raids by the Kaidu, Chagataids, and the Qara'unas in Khorasan and Herat, the Iranian eastern frontier remained relatively stable until Timur's rise.

== Legacy ==
Map of the Holy Land depicting operations during Edward's Crusade: Mamluks Crusaders Mongols

Abaqa's focus on the eastern front limited his ability to respond to threats in the west. Between 1268 and 1270, while occupied with conflicts in Central Asia, he did not send troops to support Antioch, an Ilkhanid vassal, which fell to Mamluk Sultan Baybars in 1268. Similarly, he took no action against Baybars advance on the Crusader states in 1269. In 1271, when the future King of England, Edward I, arrived in Acre, Abaqa provided only a small force, which raided northern Syria in October 1271 but withdrew upon the Mamluks approach. Following the Battle of Herat, Abaqa launched a retaliatory campaign against Bukhara, leading to mass emigration from the city.

Baraq's defeat at the Battle of Herat significantly contributed to Kaidu's rise to the throne, more so than the quriltai of 1269. This victory allowed Kaidu to attain a senior political position and expand his military forces. Additionally, Baraq's defeat secured the loyalty of Masud Beg, who joined Kaidu's service in the aftermath of the battle. The cooperation between Kaidu and Masud Beg continued until Masud's death in 1289, with his sons serving Kaidu afterward. Under Kaidu's rule, Masud Beg initiated a currency reform in Central Asia in 1271, which played a key role in the region's economic rehabilitation.
