= 2014 Yahyakhel suicide bombing =

2014 massacre in Afghanistan

- Part of Taliban insurgency
- Yahya Khel (Afghanistan)
- Location: Yahya Khel District, Paktika Province, Afghanistan
- Date: 23 November 2014
- Attack type: Suicide bombing
- Deaths: 61

On 23 November 2014, a suicide bomber detonated his explosives at a volleyball match being held in the Yahyakhel District of Afghanistan's southeastern province Paktika. The explosion immediately killed at least 50 civilians and injured another 60. Many children were among the dead and wounded. By the next day, the death toll had climbed to 61.

Afghanistan's intelligence agency named the Haqqani network, which is closely aligned with the Taliban, as being behind the attack.

== Reactions ==
- (Afghanistan) President Ashraf Ghani, who visited some of the wounded at a military hospital in Kabul, condemned attack as "inhumane and un-Islamic," saying "this kind of brutal killing of civilians cannot be justified."
- (United Nations) Nicholas Haysom, head of the UN Assistance Mission in Afghanistan (UNAMA), called the attack an "atrocity." A statement released by his spokesperson, Secretary-General Ban Ki-moon denounced the attack as "fundamentally abhorrent" and expressed his "steadfast solidarity with the people of Afghanistan in refusing to be cowed by such attacks."
