= June 2017 Herat mosque bombing =

Bomb attack in Herat, Afghanistan

Coordinates: 34°20′35.2″N 62°11′49.3″E

2017 Herat bombing
- Part of War in Afghanistan (2001–present)
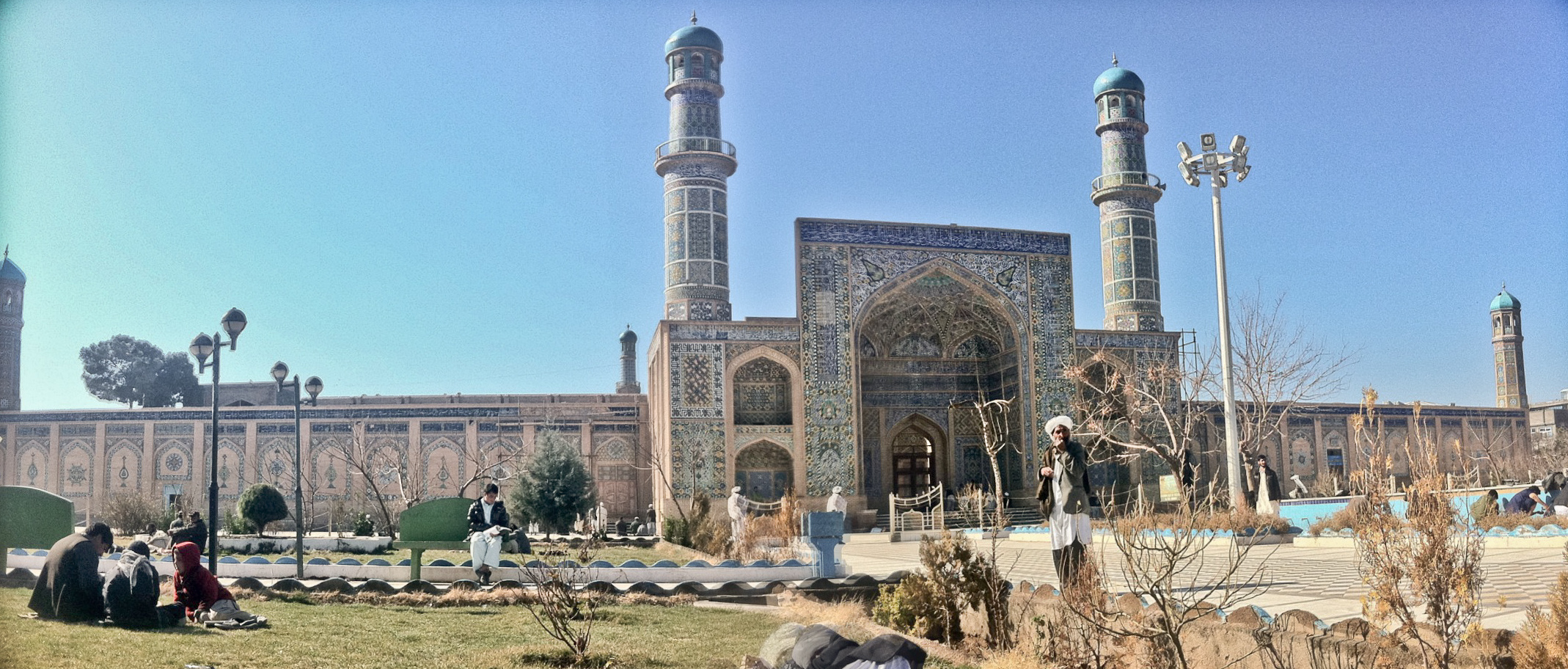
- Great Mosque of Herat
- Location: Herat, Afghanistan
- Date: 6 June 2017
- Weapon: Explosives
- Deaths: 7
- Injuries: 15
- Perpetrator: Unknown

On June 6, 2017, a bomb explosion outside the Great Mosque of Herat, a historic mosque in the western city of Herat in Afghanistan killed at least 7 civilians, and wounded at least 15 others.

== Attack ==
A bomb hidden in a rickshaw detonated near the jama masjid (congregational mosque), a 12th-century mosque, killing seven people and injuring at least fifteen more. People were gathering at the mosque for Ramadan prayers. The Taliban denied responsibility for the attack in a statement to Al-Jazeera.
