= Siege of Herat (1221) =

Mongol invasion of the Khwarazmian Empire

- Part of the Mongol invasion of Khorasan
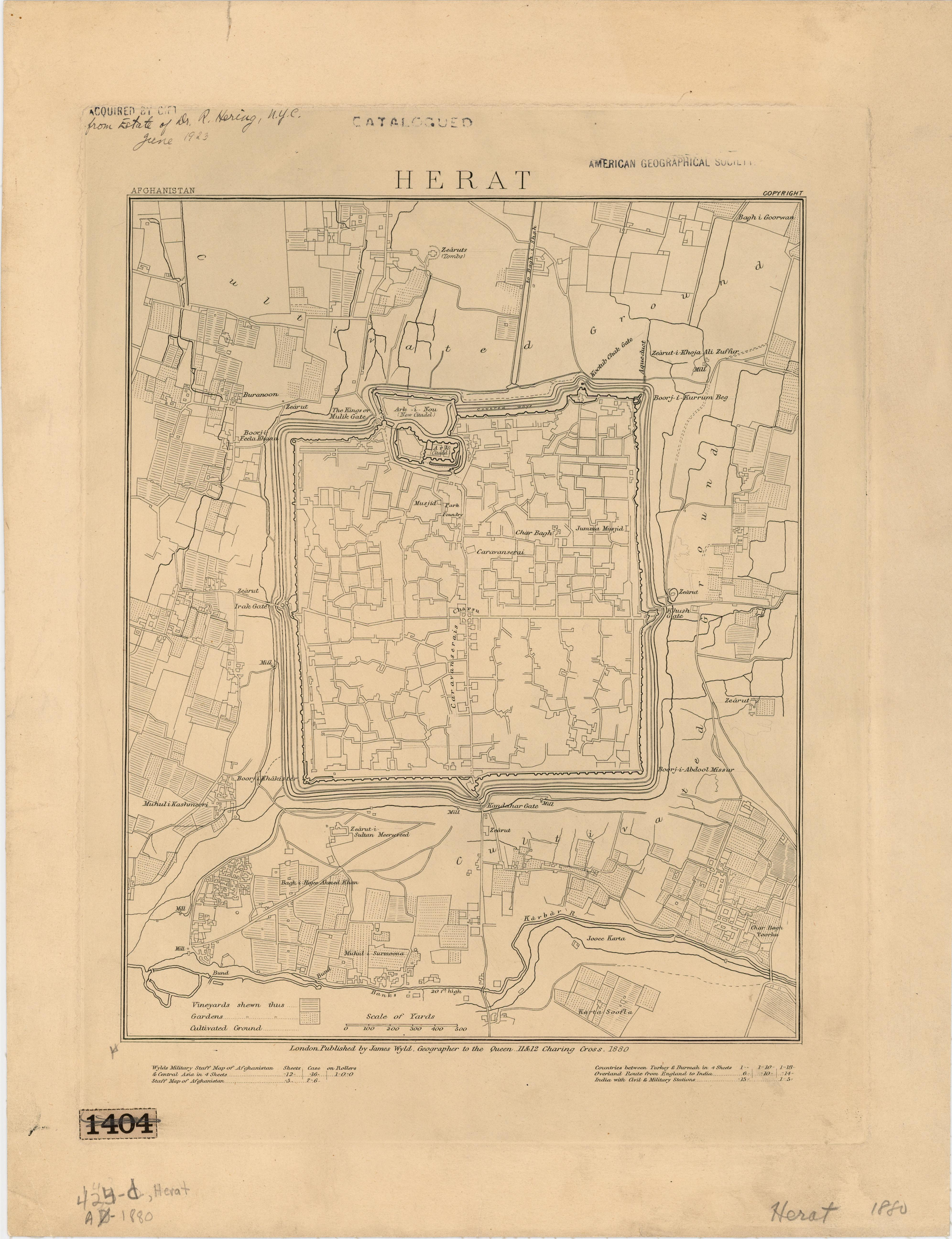
- Map of Herat (1880). The citadel at the center occupies the same site as the fortress destroyed during the Mongol siege of 1221.
Date	May or June 1221 (first siege); December 1221-June 1222 (second siege)
Location	Herat, Khwarazmian Empire (present-day Herat Province, Afghanistan) 34°20′N 62°12′E
Result	Mongol victory
Territorial changes	Herat and surrounding regions incorporated into the Mongol Empire

Belligerents
Mongol Empire	Khwarazmian Empire

Commanders and leaders
Tolui; Eljigidei	Malik Shams al-Din Muhammad Juzjani †

Strength
Unknown	12,000 men

Casualties and losses
Unknown	1,600,000 killed
- Location of Herat in present-day Afghanistan Herat (West and Central Asia)

The siege of Herat (Persian:محاصره هرات) took place in 1221 CE (618–619 AH), during the Mongol invasion of Khorasan. It consisted of two military engagements fought at the city in 1221 and 1222. The campaign was led by Tolui, son of Genghis Khan, after the citizens of Herat revolted and killed the Mongol garrison stationed in the city. Following its capture, Herat was extensively destroyed, and a large portion of its population was massacred.

The city of Herat was an important center of learning, commerce, and culture in Khorasan. The city was strategically located on key trade routes connecting Central Asia and Persia, and it flourished as a regional hub with bustling markets and skilled artisans producing textiles and other goods. Herat became part of the Khwarazmian Empire prior to the Mongol invasion. In 1221, a Mongol army commanded by Tolui, son of Genghis Khan, laid siege to the city. After the city fell, the Mongols massacred the entire population and destroyed much of its infrastructure. According to chroniclers, the city was devastated to the point that very little of its former structures survived.

== Background ==
In April 1221, after destroying Nishapur, Tolui continued his campaign to pacify Greater Khorasan by advancing on to Herat, the only major city left in the region.

During the Middle Ages, Central Asian cities such as Merv, Bukhara, and Samarkand typically had a citadel (kuhandiz) located on high ground, serving as the last line of defense. Then there was the intramural area (sahristan) where most of the population lived and the main buildings were located. Finally, they had the suburbs (rabad) that were outside the walls.

== Siege ==
=== First siege ===
On their way, the Mongols sacked the citadels of Fūshanj and Kūsūyi These sieges must have taken 10 to 15 days. Their arrival in Herat must have been between the end of May or the first half of June 1221 or most likely in May. The city was ruled by Malik Shams al-Din Muhammad Juzjani, who had been appointed as the governor of Khorasan by Shah Jalal al-Din Mangburni.

The city had 100,000 defenders according to Alugh Beg Mirza or 190,000 according to Herawi and Çelebi. Tolui sent a messenger named Zanbür to negotiate the city's surrender. The inhabitants executed the Mongol envoy. which led an enraged Tolui to swear revenge. According to Juzjani, he had 50,000 Mongols and renegade Muslims for the siege.

The Mongols came from the north, through Baghis. Tolui plundered the surrounding countryside before concentrating on the city itself which he surrounded on all sides with catapults. He set up camp south of the city, on the Beshuran meadows, between the city walls and Hari Rud.

According to Juzjani, the city's emirs prepared to defend it, but their catapults were poorly positioned and instead of throwing rocks at the Mongol camp, the projectiles hit the city itself. For seven days and nights the fighting was fierce. According to Herawi, over 30,000 men on both sides died in the first day, including 1,700 Mongol nobles. During the fighting, the city's governor was killed, which demoralized his men.

Shortly afterward, Tolui crossed the trench and at the Firuzabad gate called on the inhabitants to surrender. On the eighth day, one hundred nobles and merchants led by Ezz al-Din Moqaddam Heravi left the city to negotiate, carrying nine fine linen tunics as a gift. The siege lasted for ten days.

Finally, the Mongols stormed the Sikandar district and massacred almost all of its inhabitants, who were a quarter of the city's population. According to Juzjani, the victims numbered 600,000, and this chronicler extrapolates the total for all of Herat to 2,400,000. Based on the above figure, Kâtip Çelebi stated that the Mongols took 600,000 people out through each of the city's four gates and massacred them in the open, with only 200,000 inhabitants surviving. Herawi indicates that some 600,000 people were executed, including 100,000 children under the age of fourteen. In contrast, Athir described in his work that the inhabitants managed to negotiate with their conquerors and only a portion of them perished.

The Mongols settled for leaving two governors, the Mongol Monketai (Mengetei) and the Iranian Abu Bakr Maruchaq. The historian René Grousset interpreted that the population must have opened the gates and it was the Khwarezmian garrison that resisted, and those troops were the ones massacred. These were probably the 12,000 executed soldiers mentioned by Mirchond Abulghazi Bahadur, al-Isfizari, and Herawi the first added that the rest of the population was not harmed. Mirza mentions that 1200 servants of the Shah were executed, but that the population was spared. Tolui went to Taloqan to assist his father, Genghis Khan. Herat appeared to be under control, but it was a tense calm. Soon after, the Mongols began to besiege the citadel of Kalyun, which had already withstood two Mongol sieges. The governors wanted to curry favor with the Khagan by sending soldiers to Herat to help with the siege, and so they armed the inhabitants.

=== Second siege ===
In November, after learning of the Mongol defeat at Parwan the inhabitants of Herat, in rebellion, killed both governors. Abu Bakr was lynched near the citadel, and then all the Mongol soldiers in the city were killed when angry mobs took to the streets; one sheikh claimed that the revolt was instigated by agents of Kalyun who had infiltrated the city in the spring disguised as merchants and concealing weapons in their clothing. In December the Mongols returned, and the city resisted. as Genghis Khan had ordered that its inhabitants not be spared. Juzjani implies that the Mongol forces returned after the Battle of the Indus and the capture of Taloqan. According to Mirchond, Abulghazi, Mirza, and Herawi, came from Ghazni and initially numbered 80,000 men. In contrast, Çelebi claimed that there were 60,000.

The defenders were led by the Jewish banker Khwajah Fakhr-ud-Din-i-Abd-ur-Rahman and the commander of the Firuz-Koh fort, Malik Mubariz-ud-Din, who had evacuated the fortress to take refuge in Herat. The Mongols were led by the general (noyan) Eljigidei and the siege lasted until June 14, 1222. From the surrounding area, 50,000 infantry and cavalry came to defend Herat, engaging in numerous battles during sorties, but gradually the Mongols grew stronger and the Muslims weakened. The Mongols must have received reinforcements from the Amu Darya, perhaps some 50,000 according to Mahendrarajah and Mirza.

Once again the city was taken by storm, but this time without quarter. The Mongols deployed 20,000 to 30,000 soldiers on each side of the city and began their attacks. Juzjani mentions the case of Malik Mubariz-ud-Din, an old man who fought bravely in his armor in those final moments. The Mongols suffered thousands of casualties, almost 5,000 and the fighting lasted 6 months Finally, 400 Mongols managed to breach the walls and the fighting inside continued for another three days. The fact that the city withstood this second siege for so many months would indicate that the first surrender was negotiated and most of its defenses remained intact.

== Aftermath ==
The Mongols looted and burned everything they found for seven days and killed all the inhabitants. According to Herawi, 1,600,000 people were killed. Çelebi claimed that 300,000 lives were lost in the second siege.

On the eighth day, the Mongols marched to Kalawin, but upon reaching the village of Obeh, east of Herat, Eljigidei sent 2,000 horsemen back to the city to kill any survivors hiding among the ruins. The horsemen remained there for two days, killing nearly 2,000 survivors, before returning with the main army. There is mention of an old man who survived and, after seeing the ruins, thanked Allah that it was all over. Çelebi mentioned that 16 people survived and it took eleven years for the city to be rebuilt. The Mongols brought 1,000 captured horses as a gift to the Khagan. Abulghazi reduced the number of survivors to just 15.

After destroying Herat, the Mongol force split in two. Eljigidei remained in Khorasan, where he besieged the fort of Kalyun, located between Herat and Balkh, while ignoring Tulak despite its inhabitants' hostility towards the Mongols. This latter stronghold had submitted during Tolui's first campaign and a Pro-Mongol governor, Yamal ad-Din, was installed, but a revolt broke out and he was deposed.

Part of his army was sent to Sistan under the command of Söyiketü, another Mongol general who had participated in the siege of Herat. Around July 1222, this force managed to subdue Sistan and returned to Kalyun to join Eljigidei. The fort held out for another four months, and when it fell in November, its garrison had been reduced to 50 men. When Kalyun fell, the inhabitants of Tulak stood firm and, according to Juzjani, waged war against the Mongols for four years.

The fort of Firuz-Koh the former capital of the Gaur sultans could hold 1,000 men. Finally, when a large Mongol force under Tolui fell, all the defenders died.

According to the Ta'rīḵẖ-Nāma-yi-Harāt (History of Herat), a 14th- century work by Saif Bin Muhammad Bin Yaqoob Alhirwi, in 1236 Khagan Ogedei ordered the reconstruction of Herat, beginning with the repair of a canal to allow for the cultivation of wheat again, as there were no farmers or livestock in the area.
