= 2022 Kunduz mosque bombing =

2022 bombing in Afghanistan

- Part of the Islamic State–Taliban conflict
- Kunduz (Afghanistan)
- Location: Kunduz, Afghanistan
- Date: 22 April 2022
- Target: Sufis
- Attack type: Bombing
- Deaths: 33
- Injuries: 43
- Perpetrator: Islamic State – Khorasan Province (suspected)

On 22 April 2022, the Sufi Mawlawi Sekandar Mosque in Kunduz, Afghanistan was bombed, leaving 33 people dead and 43 others injured.

== Background ==
Afghanistan was ruled from 1996 to 2001 as a Sharia state under the rule of hardline Deobandi Islamist movement the Taliban. An international coalition led by the United States invaded Afghanistan in 2001 and toppled the Taliban regime, leading to a twenty-year war with Taliban insurgents until 2021, when the United States finally withdrew from the country, leading to almost the entire country being placed under Taliban control.

Since 2015, Afghanistan has been impacted by an armed conflict between Taliban forces and the Islamic State – Khorasan Province (IS-K). After the Taliban seized power in 2021, IS-K has led an insurgency against the government and has claimed responsibility for several terror attacks. These include the suicide bombing at a Kabul airport which killed 183 people. The organization was also responsible for another attack on a Mosque in Kunduz in which at least 50 worshippers were killed.

In April 2022 the insurgency flared up again. On 19 April, a Shia Hazara school in Kabul was bombed by IS-K militants, killing six. The day before the bombing, an explosion claimed by the organization ripped through the walls of a mosque in Mazar-i-Sharif. 37 Shia worshippers were killed.

Sufis are a minority in Afghanistan and have historically faced persecution from the Sunni majority, including from both IS-K and the Taliban.

== Attack ==
The attack occurred during the afternoon at the Khanaqa-e-Malawi Sikandar mosque in Imam Sahib District. The explosion that followed completely destroyed one of the walls and shattered glass across the room. Casualties were heavy, with a witness remembering "20 to 30 bodies" in the ruins of the building. Another local who was one of the first to come to the scene said that "all those who were worshipping inside the mosque were either injured or killed." Reports initially stated two people had been killed and six injured but government spokesman Zabiullah Mujahid later stated that at least 33 had died and 43 were injured.

No group claimed responsibility.

== See also ==
- Persecution of Sufis
- Terrorist incidents in Afghanistan in 2022
- 2017 Sinai mosque attack
