= Yahyakhel District =

District of Afghanistan

Yahyakhel District (Pashto: يحيی خېل ولسوالۍ) is a district of Paktika Province, Afghanistan.
