= December 2022 Mazar-i-Sharif bombing =

Bombing and civilian killing in Mazar-i-Sharif

- Mazar-i-Sharif (Afghanistan)
- Location: Mazar-i-Sharif, Afghanistan
- Date: 6 December 2022
- Target: Civilians
- Attack type: Bombing (mine)
- Weapon: Mine
- Deaths: 7
- Injuries: 6

On 6 December 2022 a roadside bomb blast killed at least 7 and injured 6 people in Mazar-i-Sharif, Afghanistan.

Seven petroleum company employees aboard a bus were killed police said. “The bomb was placed in a cart by the roadside. It was detonated as the bus arrived,” according to the police.

== See also ==
- List of massacres in Afghanistan
- Crime in Afghanistan
