= 2021 Kabul school bombing =

Bombing in Kabul, Afghanistan

- Part of the war in Afghanistan and the 2021 Afghanistan attacks
- 2021 Kabul school bombing (Kabul) Location of the school
- Location: Kabul, Islamic Republic of Afghanistan
- Date: 8 May 2021
- Target: Hazaras
- Attack type: Improvised explosive device
- Weapon: Car bomb
- Deaths: 90
- Injuries: 240
- Perpetrator: ISIS-K (suspected)

On 8 May 2021, a car bombing followed by two more improvised explosive device (IED) blasts occurred in front of Sayed al-Shuhada High School in Dashte Barchi, a predominantly Shia Hazara area in western Kabul, Afghanistan, leaving at least 90 people dead and 240 injured. The majority of the casualties were girls between 11 and 15 years old. The attack took place in a neighborhood that has frequently been targeted by members of the Islamic State – Khorasan Province (IS-K) over the years.

Following the attack, residents of Dashte Barchi expressed anger over the lack of security in the area. The residents said the government had not done enough to secure Dashte Barchi, in spite of knowing it had repeatedly come under attack from IS-K. Many of the residents held Afghan President Ashraf Ghani responsible for the attack and raised loud chants against the Afghan government and security forces.

== Background ==
The Dashte Barchi area of Kabul is populated by members of Afghanistan's Hazara ethnic group. In 2018, 34 people were killed in a school bombing and around 24 people were killed in an attack on a wrestling club in the area. In 2020, 24 people were killed in an attack on a maternity hospital and around 30 were killed when Kawsar-e-Danish tutoring center was attacked in the same area. Islamic State affiliates (IS) claimed responsibility for most of the attacks. Most Hazaras practice Shia Islam and are considered heretics by the IS.

Afghanistan in general had also seen a large increase in fighting between Afghan security forces and Taliban insurgents as both sides tried to gain control of strategic areas ahead of the withdrawal of U.S. and NATO troops.

== Attack ==
A car bomb exploded in front of the entrance of Sayed al-Shuhada school. The school teaches both boys and girls in three shifts, the second being for females.

A school teacher described that "a car bomb blast happened first, and then two more explosions occurred near the girls school in Kabul". An Interior Ministry spokesman backed the statement stating the initial explosion was a car bomb followed by two IEDs.

One of the injured students recounted that she was leaving the school when the explosion occurred, and about ten minutes later there was another explosion, followed by another minutes later. She continued that everyone was disoriented and screaming, with blood, debris and personal belongings scattered around the yard.

== Casualties ==
In the immediate aftermath of the bombing, 58 people were killed and more than 160 others were wounded. A day after the attack, the death toll rose to 85. The majority of the victims were schoolgirls under the age of 18. A hospital programme coordinator for the hospital where most of the wounded were transported claimed the patients were aged mostly between 12 and 20 years old.

== Aftermath ==
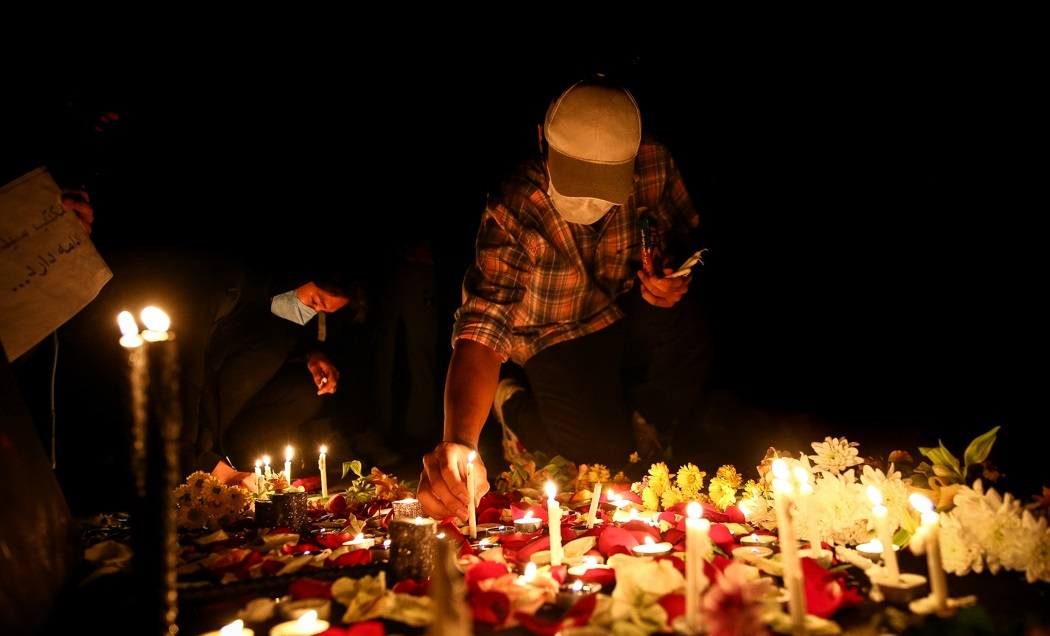
Condolences outside Afghan embassy in Tehran

Afghanistan President Ashraf Ghani condemned the terrorist attack and called 11 May as a national day of mourning in wake of the incident. President Ashraf Ghani blamed the Taliban for the attack, but Taliban spokesman Zabiullah Mujahid denied involvement in the attack, in a message released to the media. Taliban spokesman also condemned the attack and held the Islamic State responsible for the attack. Additionally, he accused Afghanistan's former intelligence agency (NDS) of being complicit with IS.

Many family members of the victims condemned the perceived inaction by the government to protect the population. One relative said; "The government reacts after the incident; it doesn't do anything before the incident". The residents of Dashte Barchi reported that it took at least one hour for the officials to reach the scene. The delay in arrival of police, intelligence and ambulances on the scene angered the crowd who then started attacking the ambulance and police vehicles. Many of the residents held Ghani responsible for the attack and raised loud chants against the Afghan government and security forces.

== See also ==
- List of terrorist incidents linked to Islamic State – Khorasan Province
- List of terrorist attacks in Kabul
- List of mass car bombings
- List of terrorist incidents in 2021
- Persecution of Hazara people
- Explosions on 21 April 2022 in Afghanistan
