= 2022 Herat mosque bombing =

Suicide attack in Afghanistan

- Part of Afghanistan conflict, Islamic State–Taliban conflict
- Herat (Afghanistan)
- Location: Herat, Afghanistan
- Date: 2 September 2022
- Target: Mujib Rahman Ansari
- Weapon: Explosive belt
- Deaths: 19 (including the perpetrator)
- Injuries: 23
- Perpetrator: Islamic State – Khorasan Province (suspected)

On 2 September 2022, a suicide bombing occurred at a mosque in Herat, northwestern Afghanistan.

During Friday noon prayers, a suicide bombing occurred at Guzargah Mosque, which is Sunni and is located in the west of Herat city. At least 18 people were killed, including the mosque's imam, Mujib Rahman Ansari, a Taliban supporter.
