= Herat bus bombing =

2022 attack in Afghanistan

Herat minivan bombing
- Location: Herat, Afghanistan
- Date: 22 January 2022
- Target: Civilians on a public transport minivan Herat (Afghanistan)
- Attack type: Bombing
- Weapon: Bomb attached to the vehicle's fuel tank
- Deaths: 7
- Injuries: 9
- Perpetrator: Unknown

On 22 January 2022, a bomb exploded in a crowded public transport minivan in Herat, Afghanistan. It killed at least 7 civilians (Note: At least four were women.) and injured 9 others.

The bomb was attached to the vehicle's fuel tank. No group claimed responsibility for the attack, which the Taliban said they will investigate.

Three of the wounded were critically injured. The bus was located in a Shia-majority neighbourhood.

== See also ==
- Terrorist incidents in Afghanistan in 2022
