= 5 August 2022 Kabul bombing =

Mass murder in Afghanistan

- Kabul (Afghanistan)
- Location: Kabul, Afghanistan
- Date: 5 August 2022
- Deaths: 8
- Injuries: 18
- Perpetrator: Islamic State – Khorasan Province

On 5 August 2022, Islamic State – Khorasan Province bombed a Muharram mourning procession in a Shi'ite neighborhood in western Kabul, Afghanistan. The attack killed at least 8 people and injured 18 others. A senior Taliban official said that explosives were placed in a vegetable cart and that the blast wounded and killed more than 50 people, including women and children.

== See also ==
- List of terrorist attacks in Kabul
- Terrorist incidents in Afghanistan in 2022
