= Bombing of the Russian embassy in Kabul =

2022 bombing in Afghanistan

- Part of the Islamic State–Taliban conflict
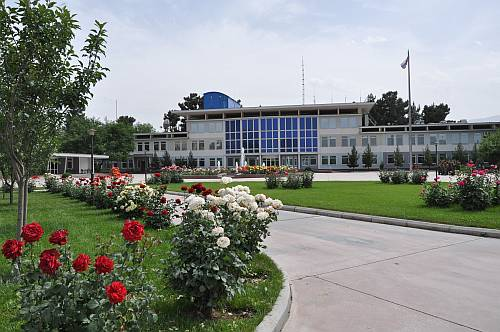
- Location: Kabul, Afghanistan
- Date: 5 September 2022; 4 years ago 10:50 a.m.
- Target: Embassy of Russia, Kabul
- Attack type: Suicide bombing
- Deaths: 8–10+
- Injuries: 15–20
- Perpetrator: Islamic State – Khorasan Province
- No. of participants: 1

On 5 September 2022, Islamic State – Khorasan Province (ISIS–K) conducted a suicide bombing outside the Embassy of Russia, in Kabul, Afghanistan.

== Attack ==
The attack was carried out at around 10:50 a.m. when a crowd of people was gathering to apply for visas to travel to Russia. Kabul police said that the terrorist had been shot dead by the security forces, but his bombs exploded after he was killed. The terrorist attack killed at least eight people, according to Al Jazeera, but RIA Novosti reported that at least ten had died. Two of the dead were embassy employees, including a Tuvan security guard, Senior Warrant Officer Adygzhi Sergeevich Kuzhuget (33) and a secretary, Mikhail Shah (57). Police said that two embassy employees and at least four Afghan civilians were killed.

An unclear number of people were injured in the bombing. RIA Novosti reported 15 to 20 wounded.

== Aftermath ==
Russian Foreign Minister Sergey Lavrov condemned the attack and held a moment of silence for the victims. According to Reuters and Gazeta.Ru, ISIS–K claimed responsibility for the attack via Telegram.

== See also ==
- List of terrorist attacks in Kabul
- List of massacres in Afghanistan
