= 28 April 2022 Mazar-i-Sharif bombings =

2022 bombings in Afghanistan

- Mazar-i-Sharif (Afghanistan)
- Location: Mazar-i-Sharif, Balkh Province, Afghanistan
- Date: 28 April 2022 (UTC+4:30)
- Target: Civilians
- Attack type: Bombings
- Deaths: 11
- Injuries: 13
- Perpetrator: Unknown

On 28 April 2022, at least 11 people were killed and 13 others injured in a double bombing in Mazar-i-Sharif in Balkh Province, Afghanistan. According to a police spokesperson, both blasts were caused by explosives placed in minibuses.

== See also ==
- Terrorist incidents in Afghanistan in 2022
