= April 2022 Kabul mosque bombing =

2022 terrorist attack in Kabul, Afghanistan

2022 Kabul mosque bombing
- Part of the Afghanistan conflict
- Kabul (Afghanistan)
- Location: Kabul, Afghanistan
- Date: 29 April 2022
- Deaths: 10–50+
- Injuries: ~30

On 29 April 2022, a bombing at a Sunni mosque in western Kabul, Afghanistan during the early afternoon killed at least 10 people.

== Background ==
The bombing was the latest in a series of attacks occurring in April 2022, during the Muslim holy month of Ramadan. Many of the attacks were claimed by the Islamic State and its affiliates, and most of them targeted Shi'a and Sufi civilians. At least 70 people were killed, making it one of the deadliest waves of attacks in the country since the withdrawal of US troops from Afghanistan. The deadliest of the previous attacks was the bombing in Kunduz.

The worshippers had congregated at the mosque for Dhikr prayers, which are considered to be heretical (bidʻah) by some radical Sunni groups.

== Attack ==
The bombing occurred around 2:00 pm at the Khalifa Aga Gul Jan Mosque in Kabul, where hundreds of congregants were gathered for prayers. Interior ministry spokesman Mohammad Nafi Takor confirmed ten fatalities. Sayed Fazil Agha, the mosque's leader, said more than 50 died. Police chief spokesman Khalid Zadran said as many as 30 people were wounded.

Agha and a number of witnesses said the attack was committed by suicide bombers. The terrorist group Islamic State did not claim responsibility for the attack, but they are the main suspect.

== Reactions ==
Taliban spokesman Zabihullah Mujahid condemned the attack and vowed justice.

The United Nations condemned the bombing as "heinous" and "yet another painful blow to the people of Afghanistan who continue to be exposed to unremitting insecurity and violence". Mette Knudsen, the U.N. secretary general's deputy special representative for Afghanistan, called it "despicable".

== See also ==
- List of terrorist attacks in Kabul
- Terrorist incidents in Afghanistan in 2022
