= September 2022 Kabul mosque bombing =

Terrorist attack in Afghanistan

- Wazir Akbar Khan (Afghanistan)
- Location: Wazir Akbar Khan, Kabul, Afghanistan
- Date: September 23, 2022
- Attack type: Car bombing
- Deaths: 7
- Injuries: 41
- Perpetrator: Unknown

On 23 September 2022, a car bomb exploded outside a mosque in the Wazir Akbar Khan neighbourhood of Kabul, Afghanistan. The explosion happened as worshippers were leaving the building after offering Friday prayers. Police said that seven people had been killed and 41 injured, including several children.

No group took responsibility. The bombing was condemned by the United States, the United Nations Assistance Mission in Afghanistan, and the European Union. Taliban authorities said that an investigation into the attack was ongoing.

“Targeting mosques and worshippers is an unforgivable crime,” the main Taliban government spokesman stated, urging the people to cooperate with the regime "in eliminating criminals".

== See also ==
- List of massacres in Afghanistan
