= May 2022 Kabul mosque bombing =

2022 bombing in Afghanistan

- Part of the Afghan conflict
- Kabul (Afghanistan)
- Location: Kabul, Afghanistan
- Date: 25 May 2022
- Deaths: 5–11+
- Injuries: 17+

On 25 May 2022, at least 5 people were killed when the Hazrat Zakaria Mosque in Kabul, Afghanistan, was bombed. At least 17 others were injured. An improvised explosive device hidden inside the mosque detonated during the Maghrib prayers.

An anonymous Taliban official told reporters that at least fourteen were killed, including the imam. This has not yet been verified. The same day, at least nine were killed in three bombings which targeted minivans in Mazar-i-Sharif, Balkh Province.

The United Arab Emirates condemned the attack as a terrorist action.

== See also ==
- Terrorist incidents in Afghanistan in 2022
- List of terrorist attacks in Kabul
