= April 2022 Kabul school bombing =

Bombing in Kabul, Afghanistan

- Part of the Persecution of Shias by the Islamic State
- Kabul (Afghanistan)
- Location: Kabul, Afghanistan
- Date: 19 April 2022
- Target: Hazaras
- Attack type: Bombing
- Deaths: 6
- Injuries: 25
- Perpetrator: Unknown

On the morning of 19 April 2022, three explosions rocked the Abdul Rahim Shahid Secondary School in a Shia Hazara neighborhood in Kabul, Afghanistan, killing at least 6 people and injuring scores of others, mainly students. Many of the wounded were teenagers.

== Background ==
Since the takeover of the country by the Deobandi Islamist Taliban in August 2021, the rival Islamic State – Khorasan Province group has frequently targeted minorities in Afghanistan, including a previous school bombing in Kabul. Most of the victims were ethnic Hazaras, who have been a target for ISIL in Afghanistan since the Taliban took power, and earlier. The return of the Taliban has also been seen as a threat by this Shia minority, who has seen many fleeing the country to other nations such as neighboring Pakistan and as far as Canada.

== Attack ==
At around 10 a.m. (UTC+4:30), an explosion occurred at the entrance of the Abdul Rahim Shahid School, one of the largest schools in the city, with 16,000 boys attending, as 11th- and 12th-graders were leaving their classes. Ten minutes later, another explosion rocked an alley near an educational campus.

Medical authorities responded to the scene quickly and injured students were transported to receive medical attention. A school nursing facility reported four people dead and 14 injured. These figures were later increased to at least 6 dead, and eleven injured. Reporters and journalists complained that Taliban authorities kept them from reaching the wounded victims being taken to hospitals in the area. However, by the next day it was reported that the Taliban had returned the bodies of the deceased to their families, with the official victim numbers reported at 6 dead and 25 injured. Some have raised claims that the Taliban disrespected the deceased and that the victims counts should be higher due to the number of individuals looking for missing family members.

No one or organization has claimed responsibility for the attacks.

== Reactions ==
Khalid Zadran, the spokesman for Kabul's commander acknowledged "Shia casualties" and the Taliban secured the area. A deputy spokesperson of the Taliban government condemned the attack and called it a "crime against humanity" and vowed that the perpetrators would be found and punished. US State Department spokesman Ned Price condemned the attack, expressing outrage at the "heinous attacks [...] in Kabul, Afghanistan" and asked for the perpetrators to be brought to justice.

Locals expressed suspicion, frustration and some conspiracy theories after the bombing. Some residents claimed that the Islamic State group, known as Daesh locally wanted to show off its strength, while others claimed that the Taliban had secretly planned the attack or unknown enemies had organized the attack.

Save the Children condemned the attack, saying that it was "deeply saddened about reports that children have been injured, and possibly killed." The International Rescue Committee (IRC) condemned the "senseless bombing of schools in Kabul", sent condolences to the victims' families and highlighted the jeopardy in which Afghan citizens live, according to IRC. Similar condemnation of the attack was seen by the United Nations Assistance Mission in Afghanistan.

== See also ==
- List of terrorist attacks in Kabul
- Terrorist incidents in Afghanistan in 2022
- Persecution of Hazara people
