= September 2022 Kabul school bombing =

2022 bombing in Afghanistan

- Part of the Afghanistan conflict
- Blast site (Kabul) Blast site (Afghanistan)
- Location: Kabul, Afghanistan
- Date: September 30, 2022; 7:30 am (UTC+4:30)
- Target: Hazaras
- Attack type: Suicide bombing
- Weapon: Explosive belt
- Deaths: 53+ (Associated Press); 25+ (Taliban authorities)
- Injuries: 110
- Victims: Students, mainly young women

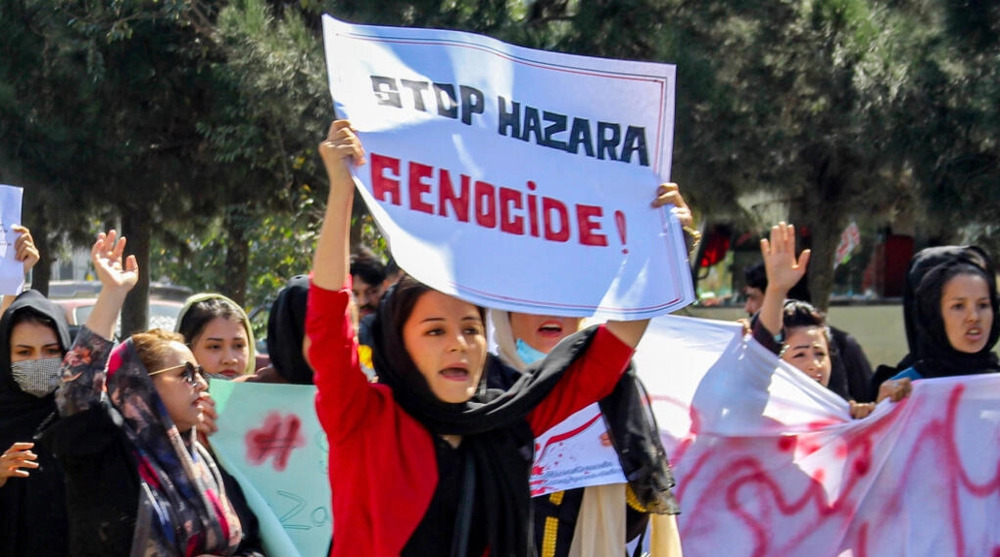
Protest of Hazara women in Kabul

On September 30, 2022, a suicide bomber blew himself up at the Kaaj education center in Dashte Barchi, a Hazara neighborhood in Kabul, Afghanistan, killing at least 53 people and injuring another 110. The majority of the victims were young Hazara female students.

== Background ==
After the fall of Kabul ended the War in Afghanistan in 2021, the ruling Taliban vowed to protect citizens, including minorities. However, the country has once again witnessed occasional terrorist attacks, especially against minorities.

== Bombing ==
The explosion occurred on September 30, 2022, at around 7:30 am UTC+04:30 at the Kaaj education center, located in a predominantly Hazara neighborhood. Approximately 300 recent high school graduates arrived at the education center one hour before the attack took place. Many of the victims included high school graduates but with the majority of the victims being young Hazara women who were taking a practice university exam at the time of the explosion. According to a witness interviewed by the Associated Press, there were gunshots heard outside the building prior to the detonation.

The Islamic State group in Afghanistan (ISIS-K) said they carried out the attack. Many countries and organizations around the world criticized the bombing. The Hazara people, a Shia Muslim minority in Afghanistan, have often been targeted by armed groups.

== Reactions ==
UNICEF has stated that it was "appalled by the horrific attack", while United States charge d'affaires at the embassy in Afghanistan, Karen Decker, called the attacks "shameful".

The Taliban spokesman Zabiullah Mujahid condemned the attack on Twitter, claiming the attack was a big crime that was strongly condemned and expressed his sympathy to the families of the victims.

Abdul Rahman Nafiz, the local police chief in the region reportedly criticized the Kaaj education centre for not informing the police of the practice exam that was taking place.

The Interior Ministry spokesman, Abdul Nafi Takor, told the press that police have reportedly arrested a suspect potentially linked to this attack.

Muhammad Mohaqiq, the chairman of People's Islamic Unity Party of Afghanistan, has warned the resistance by Hazaras will start and allowed anyone who want join resistance.

The Guardian reported that women protesting the attack were being beaten by the Taliban.

A Twitter campaign with the hashtag #StopHazaraGenocide was started on October 2, 2022. The hashtag has been tweeted over 3 million times and was supported by celebrities from Afghanistan and rest of the world.

== See also ==
- List of terrorist incidents linked to Islamic State – Khorasan Province
- List of terrorist attacks in Kabul
- List of massacres in Afghanistan
