= Attack on the Indian embassy in Kabul =

Attack on the Indian embassy in Kabul can refer to:

- 2008 Indian embassy bombing in Kabul
- 2009 Kabul Indian embassy attack
