= Kabul City Center =

Shopping mall in Kabul, Afghanistan

- کابل سیتی سینتر
- Kabul City Centre in 2007

General information
- Status: Completed
- Type: Shopping mall Hotel
- Architectural style: Postmodern
- Location: Shahr-e Naw, Zargona Road, Kabul, Afghanistan
- Coordinates: 34.5325°N 69.1656°E
- Opened: 2005
- Renovated: 2010
- Cost: US $ 35 million
- Owner: Haji Abdul Qudus Safi

Technical details
- Floor count: 10
- Lifts/elevators: 3

Design and construction
- Engineer: Louis Berger Group

Other information
- Number of stores: 100
- Number of suites: 40
- Number of restaurants: 2

Website
- www.safilandmarkhotelsuites.com

Kabul City Center (Note: Pashto: کابل سیتی سینتر Dari: کابل سیتی سینتر) is a shopping mall in Shahr-e Naw, Kabul, Afghanistan. Opened in 2005, it consists of 100 stores and a food court. It is equipped with see-through elevators and escalators and is notable for being the first building in Kabul to be equipped with functional escalators. The building also includes the Safi Landmark Hotel, a 4-star hotel that occupies the top six of the building's ten floors. The Safi Landmark has become one of the most famous hotels in Kabul for visitors and foreigners. The building has been subject to two terrorist attacks, in 2010 and 2011. In 2013, the mall received media attention for housing an unofficial Apple Store.

== History ==
When Ghulam Hazrat Safi returned to Kabul from Dubai, United Arab Emirates, he invested US$35 million to build both Kabul City Center shopping mall and its adjacent hotel, the Safi Landmark Hotel. The hotel employs 150 local staff and 100 Indian staff.

On 26 February 2010, the mall was attacked by a Taliban suicide bomber, who killed 16 people inside the building, 11 of whom were foreigners (nine Indians, an Italian, and a French person). Three Afghani policemen and two persons of unknown origin were also killed. The bombing caused the windows from the building to shatter, dropping debris onto the pedestrian street nearby. The Ministry of External Affairs for India described the bombing as a targeted attack on both Indian and Afghan people, as the victims were mostly Indians. However, Zabiullah Mujahid, a spokesman for the Taliban, denied the motive behind the bombing was to intentionally target Indian people and attempt to erode Afghanistan–India relations, instead claiming that European people were their primary target. US$4 million was spent to bring the mall back to operation within two months of the attack.

Immediately after the first bombing, the mall was renovated to install explosive resistant glass windows and screening of all visitors by metal detectors before they were allowed to enter was begun. This screening stopped a suicide bomber from entering the mall on 14 February 2011.

== Features ==
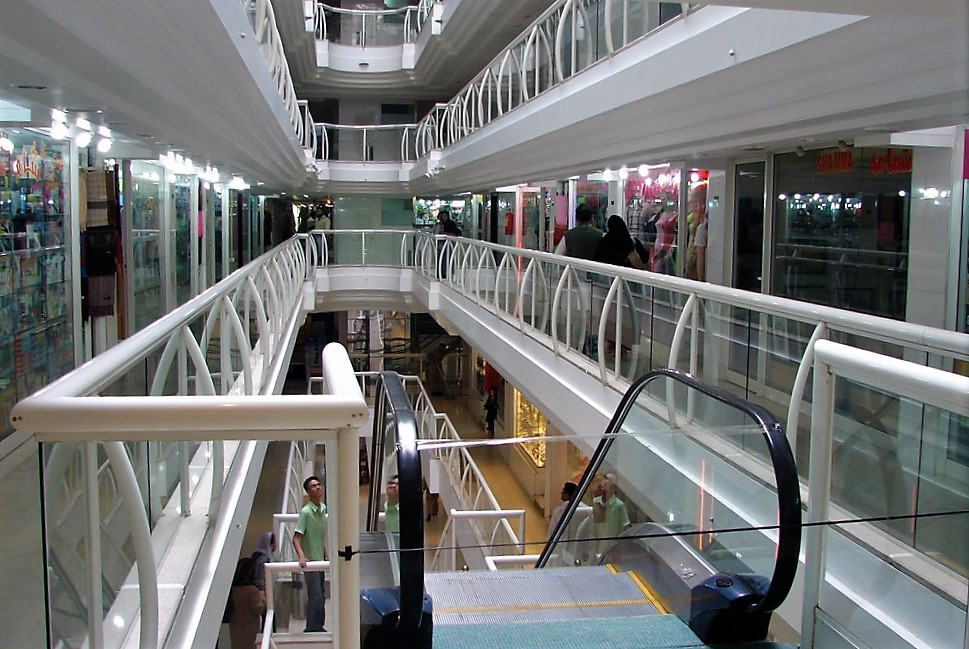
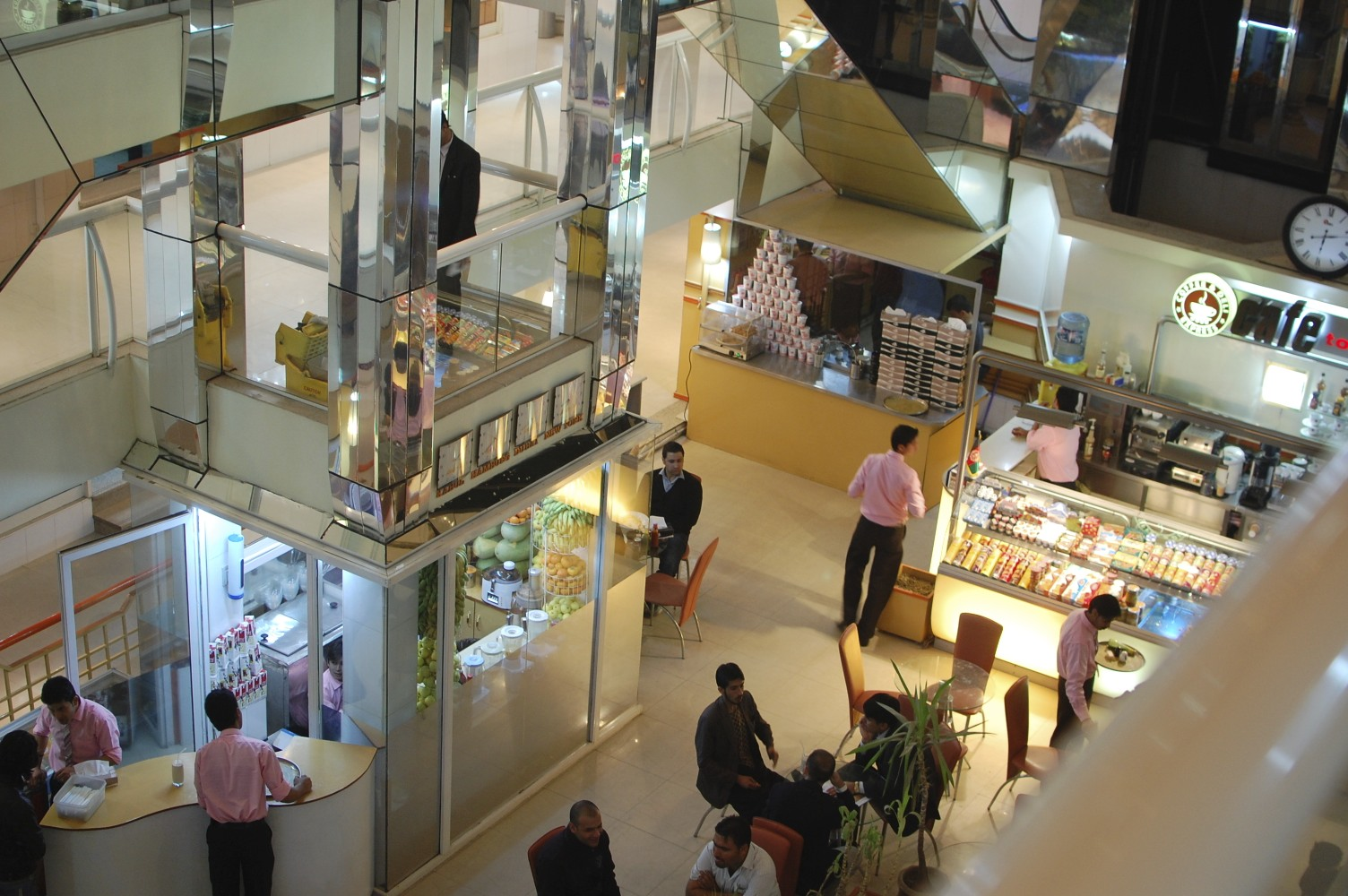
Inside Kabul City Center: escalator (left); food court (right)

Kabul City Center consists of 100 shops, including a jewelry store, electronics store, boutique, antique shop and bookstore, with food court located on the ground floor which are very similar to most of the European shopping malls. The main visitors to the mall are mainly foreigners and expatriates. Initially the restaurant was mostly occupied only by men, however a year later after the opening, more women started to visit the mall, with restaurant becoming a common meeting place for men and women.

One of the notable features of the mall is the escalator, which has become one of the most famous attractions in the city, as Kabul City Center was the first building in Kabul to be equipped with escalators, and after its construction became the only building in Afghanistan with working escalators.

Kabul City Center garnered further media attention when an unofficial Apple Store was opened inside the mall in August 2010. According to an interview with the store manager conducted by Quartz in April 2013, their products are more expensive than the retail price in America. For example, the iPhone 5 16 GB was sold in Afghanistan for US$700, which is $50 more than the original price in the United States. The shop's products are imported from Dubai and sales are reported to be healthy, with six iPhones and two MacBooks sold each day, despite limited stock. Most of the store's customers are young people who work in the private sector. The store manager has considered expansion by adding a service and repair center, as well as opening a second branch in another area of Kabul. The store's manager claims to have mailed a photo of the store's grand opening to Apple Inc. without reply.

== Public reception ==
The mall has been described as luxurious and expensive by many Afghani citizens as most of the products sold inside are considered unaffordable by the majority of the population. Many people who visit the mall are known as "gawkers", asking the price of an item and, once it is revealed by salesman, leaving the store without making a purchase. The electronics sold inside the mall are considered beyond the imagination of many Afghans, the majority of whom still lack access to electricity.

Despite the unaffordability, many people visit the mall to experience the escalator, which cannot be found elsewhere in Afghanistan. Because many Afghans do not have experience with the technology inside the mall, some have trouble using the facilities. One woman is reported to have injured herself after trying to walk down the 'up' escalator.

Some citizens have argued that, instead of spending money building luxurious shops in the mall, investment should be made in building factories, which would create job opportunities for the unemployed.
