= February 2010 Kabul attack =

Suicide bombing and shooting attacks in Kabul

- Part of the Taliban insurgency
- Kabul (Afghanistan)
- Location: Kabul
- Date: 26 February 2010
- Target: Kabul city center, Indian presence in Afghanistan
- Attack type: Suicide attack, armed gunmen
- Deaths: 18
- Injuries: 36
- Perpetrators: Taliban, Lashkar-e-Taiba

The February 2010 Kabul attack on 26 February 2010 was a combined suicide bombing and shooting attack. A car bomb levelled the Arya Guesthouse, also known as the Hamid Guesthouse, popular with Indian doctors. Two armed attackers then entered the nearby Park Residence, housing other foreigners. One detonated a suicide bomb, and the other was shot dead. The Safi Landmark Hotel nearby was badly damaged by the blasts. At least 18 people were killed and 36 more were injured.

According to initial intelligence reports, the attack was directed against Indian presence in Afghanistan and was carried out by Pakistan-based militants.

== Background ==
In early 2010, U.S. and British forces launched a major military campaign in Marjah during which the Taliban suffered a series of setbacks.

In February 2010, India and Pakistan started peace talks for the first time since 2008 Mumbai attacks. The Taliban strongly opposed Indian presence in Afghanistan, especially because India has extensively helped Northern Alliance forces in the past. Pakistan, an arch-rival of India, was also against the increasing Indian influence in Afghanistan and Pakistani intelligence agencies maintained deep ties with the Taliban. India contributed more than $2 billion for reconstruction in Afghanistan and had close ties with president Hamid Karzai who was educated in India. Most of Indian aid went into building roads, electrical power plants and providing health care. American intelligence believe that a previous attack on Indian embassy in Kabul was supported by Pakistan's Inter-Services Intelligence.

== Attack ==
Hamid Guest House and Park Residence the two guest houses targeted are located in the Shar-e-Naw neighborhood of Kabul. The first assault included a suicide car bomb attack next to Hamid Guest house frequented by Indian nationals in Kabul. It left a crater 12 feet across and 8 feet deep. Soon after the car bomb exploded, armed militants stormed Park Residence which is popular with Europeans which resulted in a firefight that lasted for more than 90 minutes.

== Casualties ==
Deaths by nationality
Country	Number
India	9
Afghanistan	3
France	1
Italy	1
Total	18

Of the 18 people dead, nine were Indian nationals. Three Afghan police officers, a French filmmaker Severin Blanchet and an Italian diplomat Pietro Antonio Colazza were also among those dead.

=== Indian casualties ===
- Major (Dr.) L. Jyotin Singh of Army Medical Corps
- Major Deepak Yadav of Army Education Corps
- Nitish Chhibber, assistant at the Consulate General of India in Kandahar
- Roshan Lal, constable in the Indo-Tibetan Border Police
- Bhola Ram, Engineer
- Ustad Nawab Khan, a Tabla player.

The Times of India reported that among the dead were Indian Army and Indo-Tibetan Border Police personnel stationed in Afghanistan. The dead also included Indian physicians treating poor Afghan children at the Indira Gandhi Children's Hospital. Major Jyotin Singh was one of the doctors from the Indian army's Medical Corps who lost his life in preventing the attack. Major Jyotin Singh was unarmed but physically prevented the suicide bomber from entering the Arya guesthouse saving many lives.

== Responsibility ==
The Taliban claimed responsibility for the attack within hours. Their spokesman Mujahid said that the attack was not specifically targeted against India, but against Europeans and Americans. The next week, however, Afghan intelligence officials said the Pakistani group Lashkar-e-Taiba was involved in the attacks, saying in a TV interview they were "very close" to proving that "this attack was carried out by Lashkar-e-Taiba network, who are dependent on the Pakistan military." U.S. intelligence officials and Pakistani analysts have said that Lashkar-e-Taiba militants have been training with associates of the Haqqani network in North Waziristan. Indian officials suspect that the Taliban and the Lashkar-e-Taiba worked in concert.

A report in The New York Times suggested that Pakistan and its agencies could be responsible for the attack. A U.S. intelligence report says Pakistan "has continued to provide support to its militant proxies, such as Haqqani Taliban, Gul Bahadur group, and Commander Nazir group." Analyst Jeremy Page feared that the attacks could hamper the ongoing peace talks between India and Pakistan.

== Reaction ==
- India – The Foreign Minister of India, S.M. Krishna, called this attack as desperate attempt to "undermine the friendship between India and Afghanistan."
- Afghanistan – Afghan President, Hamid Karzai, labeled the assault as a "terrorist attack against Indian citizens." He also said that the "attacks on Indian citizens will not affect relations between India and Afghanistan."
- United Kingdom – The spokesman of British Prime Minister Gordon Brown said that the United Kingdom condemned the attacks "in the strongest possible terms."
- United Nations – The UN released a statement calling the attack on civilians in Kabul a "senseless disregard for human life."
- Canada – Canada's Minister of Foreign Affairs Lawrence Cannon stated "Canada condemns in the strongest terms the attack that occurred in Kabul’s Shar-e-Naw district today that has reportedly killed 17 people, including two Afghan policemen, and injured several others."
- Turkey – Turkish Ministry of Foreign Affairs condemned the attack. It released a statement "Turkey was resolved to act in solidarity with the Afghan government and would continue to support Afghanistan in its fight against terrorism and extremism."
- Italy – Prime minister Silvio Berlusconi released a statement "learned with sadness the news of the death of the diplomatic adviser Pietro Antonio Colazzo in today's attack in Kabul. A faithful servant of the state, who died doing his job in a country tormented by horrific terrorist acts."
- France – French foreign minister Bernard Kouchner was quoted as saying "I salute the memory of our compatriot Severin Blanchet. He was a privileged partner in French cultural action in Afghanistan. We will pursue with determination the work that he had started with such generosity and solidarity."
- United States – U.S. Ambassador to India Timothy J. Roemer in a statement said "I offer sincere condolences to the Government of India and the families, friends, and loved ones of those injured and killed in yesterday's tragic attack in Kabul,"

== See also ==
- 2008 Indian embassy bombing in Kabul
- 2009 Kabul Indian embassy attack
- List of massacres in Afghanistan
