= Afghanistan–India relations =

- Afghanistan: India

Diplomatic mission
- Embassy of Afghanistan, New Delhi: Embassy of India, Kabul

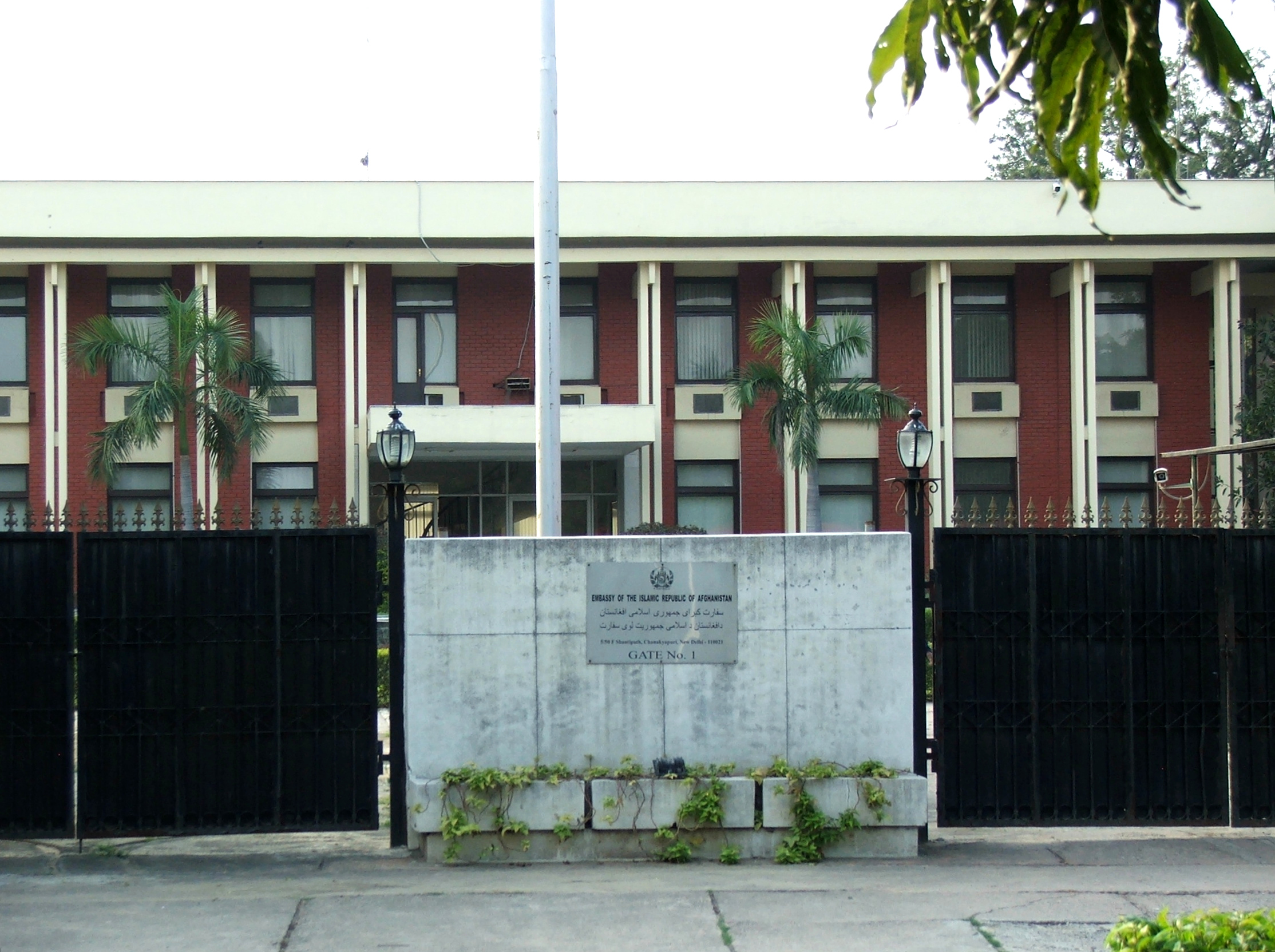
Embassy of Afghanistan, New Delhi, India

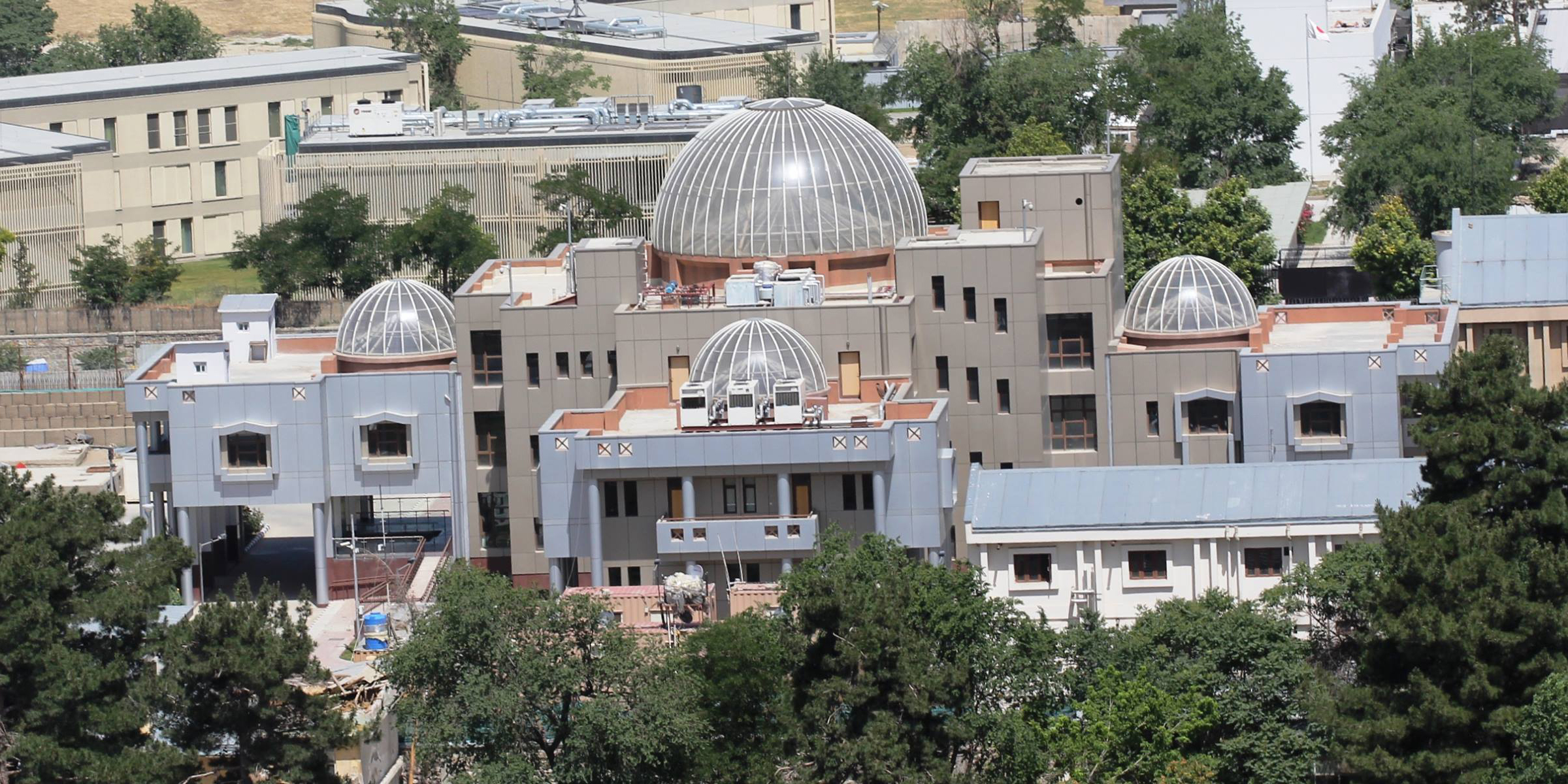
Embassy of India, Kabul, Afghanistan

The Kingdom of Afghanistan and the Union of India established bilateral relations in January 1950. India was the only South Asian country to recognize the Soviet-backed Democratic Republic of Afghanistan, supporting it in the Soviet–Afghan War (1979–1989) against the Afghan mujahideen. India supported the Northern Alliance during the 1990s Afghan civil wars and was one of the main countries opposed to the Taliban's Islamic Emirate government. Following the 9/11 attacks in 2001, India aided overthrow of the Taliban and became the largest regional provider of aid to the Islamic Republic of Afghanistan. A major shift in India's position on the Taliban was reported by a top Qatar official in June 2021, revealing that an Indian delegation quietly visited Doha to meet the Taliban's leadership. This is a major shift that was several weeks in the making in the first half of 2021, and likely involved Qatari mediation between India and the Taliban. Although India does not recognize the Islamic Emirate of Afghanistan, it maintains informal ties with the ruling Taliban.

In April 2017, Shaida Mohammad Abdali, Afghanistan's former ambassador to India, pointed out that India "is the biggest regional donor to Afghanistan and fifth largest donor globally with over $3 billion in assistance. India has built over 200 public and private schools, sponsors over 1,000 scholarships, and hosts over 16,000 Afghan students." Relations between Afghanistan and India received a major boost in 2011 with the signing of a strategic partnership agreement, Afghanistan's first since the Soviet-Afghan War. The student visas were revoked in large numbers after the Taliban takeover of Afghanistan.

In June 2022, India sent a "technical team" to its embassy building in Kabul. In November 2023, pro-Republican diplomats of Afghanistan left India and declared permanent closure of the embassy by lack of support. Later, under the combined leadership of consul general Zakia Wardak and acting consul general Syed Muhammad Ibrahimkhel, the embassy was reopened. Currently, Syed Muhammad Ibrahimkhel is the chargé d'affaires of the embassy. Both countries have shared cultural ties through Bollywood and cricket.

== History ==
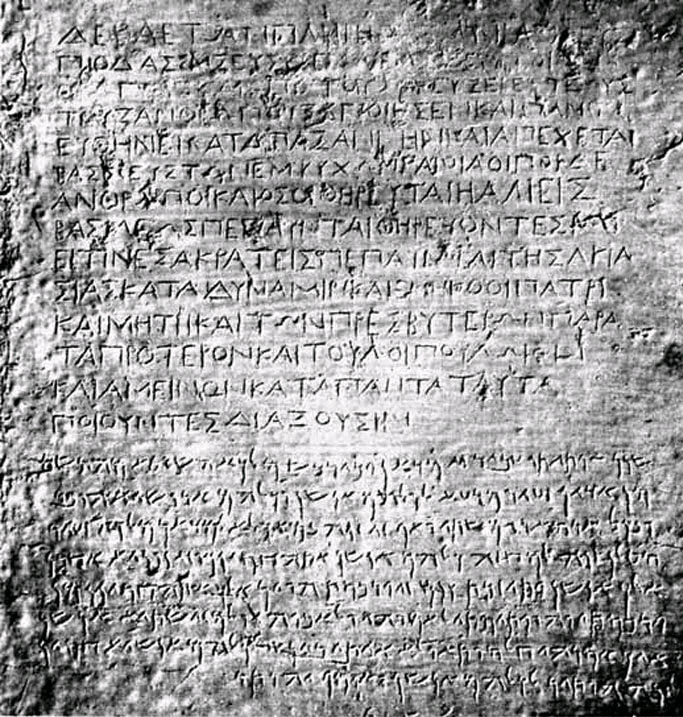
An Edict of Ashoka from Kandahar, now in the Kabul museum.

Relations between the people of Afghanistan and India trace to the Indus Valley Civilisation. In the Vedic age, Gandhara, which forms part of modern-day Pakistan and Afghanistan, was considered one of the sixteen Mahajanapadas of Vedic India. Following Alexander the Great's brief occupation, the successor state of the Seleucid Empire controlled the region known today as Afghanistan. In 305 BCE, they ceded some regions to the Indian Maurya Empire as part of an Alliance Treaty after losing to the superior Indian forces.

Alexander took these away from the Aryans and established settlements of his own, but Seleucus Nicator gave them to Sandrocottus (Chandragupta), upon terms of intermarriage and of receiving in exchange 500 elephants.

— Strabo, 64 BCE – 24 CE

The war elephants, of course, being a minor contribution compared to the land that the Indians successfully regained.The Mauryans controlled parts of modern-day Afghanistan, and during this period Hinduism and Buddhism prevailed. Their decline began 60 years after Ashoka the Great's rule ended, leading to the Hellenistic reconquest of the region by the Greco-Bactrians. Much of it soon broke away from the Greco-Bactrians and became part of the Indo-Greek Kingdom. The Indo-Greeks had been defeated and expelled by the Indo-Scythians in the late 2nd century BCE. Till the Muslim conquests, eastern regions of Afghanistan including the Kabul Valley and Zabulistan were considered culturally part of Indian subcontinent, and the town of Kabul was noted by Iranian traveller and geographer Istakhri in 921 to be inhabited by the people of Hind. Between the 10th century and the mid 18th century, northern India was invaded by a number of invaders based in what today is Afghanistan. Among them were the Ghaznavids, Ghurids, Khaljis, Mughals and Durranis. During these eras, especially during the Mughal period (1526–1858), many Afghans began immigrating to India due to political unrest in their regions.

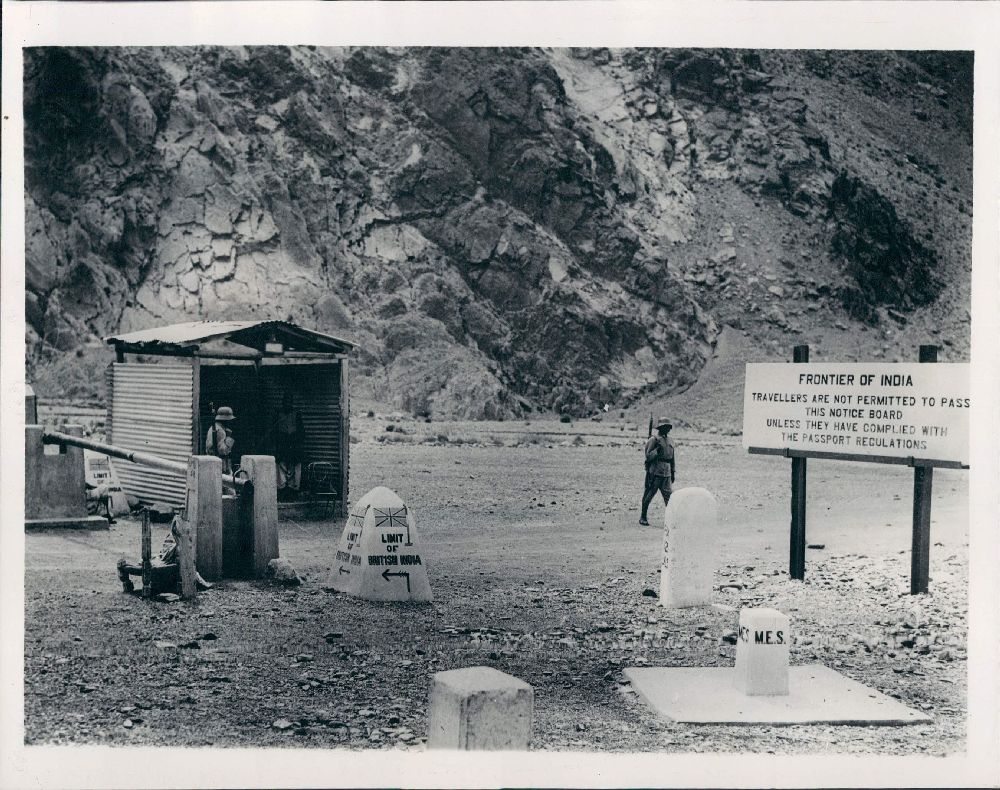
Border crossing between the British India and Afghanistan in 1934

With the partition of British India to create Pakistan the demand for, Pashtunistan, a Pashtun nation-state carved out of Pakistan by successive Pashtun-led Afghan governments was received with support from the Indian government through the backing of militant tribesman, though the movement subsequently lost support. Elisabeth Leake, an associate professor of International History at the University of Leeds writes: "Evidently, senior Indian officials supported the demand for Pashtunistan and Afghan aid to militant tribesmen. Considering the historic ties between Congress leaders and the Khudai Khidmatgars, India's support for tribal autonomy was hardly surprising; in many ways, tribal leaders were echoing the demands Ghaffar Khan had made in preceding years."

Indians are working on various construction projects, as part of India's rebuilding efforts in Afghanistan, although the Indian intelligence agency RAW is accused by countries such as Pakistan of working to malign Pakistan and train & support insurgents. These workers are estimated to be anywhere between 3,000 and 4,000. Indian nationals stationed in Afghanistan have often faced continuous security threats in the country, with kidnappings and many attacks (such as the February 2010 Kabul attack) deliberately carried out on them.

In January 1950, a five-year Treaty of Friendship was signed between the two countries in New Delhi. Other than affirming "everlasting peace and friendship between the two Governments", the treaty provided for the establishment of diplomatic and consular posts in each other's territories.

India recognized the new Republic of Afghanistan on 19 July 1973. Indian foreign minister Swaran Singh visited Afghan President Mohammed Daoud Khan in October that year, and Khan visited India in March 1975. On 7 July 1974, the two countries signed a trade protocol.

=== Soviet invasion ===
India was the only South Asian nation to recognise the Soviet-backed communist Democratic Republic of Afghanistan and the Soviet Union's invasion of Afghanistan, and provided humanitarian aid to president Mohammad Najibullah's Government in Afghanistan. The Soviets withdrew from Afghanistan in 1989 after being defeated by the Afghan mujahideen, which were heavily supported by Pakistan. It has been said that "the failure of the Indian government to publicly condemn the invasion, its support of the Soviet puppet regime of Kabul, and its hostile vision of the resistance have created major stumbling blocks in Afghan-Indian relations." India continued to support Najibullah's government.

=== First Taliban government ===
After its fall in the ensuing civil war, India along with the international community supported the coalition government that took control, but relations and contacts ended with the outbreak of another civil war, which brought to power the Taliban, an Islamist militia, supported by Pakistan. The Taliban's government, called the Islamic Emirate of Afghanistan, remained recognized only by Pakistan, Saudi Arabia, and the United Arab Emirates (UAE). The destruction of the Buddhas of Bamiyan monuments by the Taliban led to outrage and angry protests by India. Likewise, in 1998 following Pakistan's atomic bomb tests, Taliban supreme leader Mullah Omar's statement that "An attack on Pakistan would be seen as an attack on Afghanistan" sparked anger in India.

The Taliban's move in 2001 to require Afghan Hindus to wear identification patches, reminiscent of Nazi policies, was heavily criticised by India. In 1999, the hijacked Indian Airlines Flight 814 landed and stayed in Kandahar in Afghanistan and the Taliban were suspected of supporting them. India became one of the key supporters of the anti-Taliban Northern Alliance.

=== War in Afghanistan (2001-2021) ===
During the U.S.-led invasion of Afghanistan in 2001, India did not participate in the coalition forces bases for the War in Afghanistan. After the overthrow of the Taliban, India established diplomatic relations with the newly established democratic government, provided aid, and participated in the reconstruction efforts. India has provided $650–750 million in humanitarian and economic aid, making it the largest regional provider of aid for Afghanistan. India's support and collaboration extends to the rebuilding of air links, power plants and investing in health and education sectors as well as helping to train Afghan civil servants, diplomats, and police. India also seeks the development of supply lines for electricity, oil, and natural gas. Also to give Afghan students scholarships.

The Indian Army's Border Roads Organisation constructed a major road in 2009 in the remote Afghan province of Nimroz, connecting Delaram to Zaranj. This has proved a viable alternative route for the duty-free movement of goods through the Chabahar port in Iran to Afghanistan. Key to India's strategy in Afghanistan is to build up transportation links that bypass Pakistan, helping reduce the Afghan economy's dependence on Pakistan.

In 2005, India proposed Afghanistan's membership in the South Asian Association for Regional Cooperation (SAARC). Both nations also developed strategic and military cooperation against Islamic militants. Owing to the killing of an Indian national by Taliban militants in November 2005, India deployed 200 soldiers of the Indo-Tibetan Border Police (ITBP) to provide security for Indian nationals and the projects supported by India. Afghanistan strengthened its ties with India in wake of persisting tensions and problems with Pakistan, which was suspected of continuing to shelter and support the Taliban. India pursues a policy of close collaboration with countries such as Afghanistan, Bhutan, and Iran in order to bolster its standing as a regional power and contain its rival Pakistan, which stands accused of aiding and abetting Islamic militants in Kashmir and other states of India.

Three memorandums of understanding (MOUs) for strengthening cooperation in the fields of rural development, education, and standardisation between the Bureau of Indian Standards (BIS) and Afghan National Standardisation Authority were signed between Afghanistan and India during Hamid Karzai's visit to India in April 2006. An agreement providing $50 million to promote bilateral businesses between Afghanistan and India was signed during the visit of the Afghan Foreign Minister Rangin Dadfar Spanta between 29 June – 1 July 2006. During the same year, India raised its aid package to Afghanistan by $150 million, to $750 million. In 2007, Afghanistan finally became the eighth member of SAARC.

In July 2008 the Indian embassy in Kabul was attacked by a suicide car bomb – the deadliest attack in Kabul since the fall of the Taliban in 2001. The bombing killed 58 people and wounded 141. Senior Indian Army officer Brigadier Ravi Datt Mehta was entering the embassy gates in a car along with V. Venkateswara Rao when the attack took place. Both were killed in the blast. In the aftermath of the 2008 Indian embassy bombing in Kabul, the Afghan Foreign Ministry quoted India as a "brother country" and the relationship between the two as one which "no enemy can hamper".

During the 15th SAARC summit in Colombo, further pledges were made by India for ongoing and forthcoming projects. In August 2008, Afghan President Karzai visited New Delhi further strengthening bilateral relations.

On 18 October 2009, the Indian embassy in Kabul was attacked again by a car bomb, a little more than a year after the previous attack. The attack killed at least 17 people. Another attack took place at the Arya guest house where Indian doctors were staying, resulting in the death of 18 people. India's pledge to rebuild Afghanistan reached a total of $2 billion in May 2011 after Manmohan Singh arrived in Kabul for a two-day visit. In the same year India donated 250,000 tons of wheat to Afghanistan as part of the humanitarian assistance program.

According to a 2010 Gallup poll, which interviewed 1,000 adults, 50% Afghans approved of the job performance of India's leadership and 44% disapproved with 6% refusing to answer. It was the highest approval rating of India by any other country in Asia. According to the survey, Afghan adults are more likely to approve of India's leadership than Chinese or U.S. leadership.

The September 2011 assassination of former Afghan president Burhanuddin Rabbani was condemned by India, which stated that "Tragically, the forces of terror and hatred have silenced yet another powerful voice of reason and peace in Afghanistan. We unreservedly condemn this act of great brutality," and reiterated peace efforts. India promised to stand by the people of Afghanistan as they prepare to assume the responsibility for their governance and security after the withdrawal of international forces in 2014. In October 2011, Afghanistan signed its first strategic pact with India. The military assistance would include training of Afghan security personnel. During his visit to India, Karzai told the media that "This strategic partnership is not directed against any country. This strategic partnership is to support Afghanistan." He also stated that "Pakistan is our twin brother, India is a great friend. The agreement we signed with our friend will not affect our brother." He also added that "However, our engagement with Islamabad has unfortunately not yet yielded the result that we want." Both sides launched a Partnership Council, as the apex body to implement the Strategic Partnership Pact in May 2012.

On 3 August 2013, the Indian consulate in Jalalabad, Afghanistan was attacked by three suicide bombers. Afghan security forces spotted the attackers as they approached the consulate in a car leading to one of the attackers detonating his explosives. The blast killed nine people, six of them children, and wounded 24 others.

On 22 May 2014, the Indian consulate in Herat was attacked by 3 militants equipped with AK-47s, RPGs, hand grenades, and suicide vests. "Our premises have been repeatedly attacked by those who do not support India's development work in Afghanistan. The attack will not dilute India's development assistance and its contribution to rehabilitation and reconstruction of Afghanistan," India's ambassador to Kabul Amar Sinha said at the time.

On 24 December 2015, India donated three Mi-25 attack helicopters (with an option to send one more in future) to Afghanistan as part of the bilateral strategic partnership to counter the Taliban. The next day, 25 December, Indian PM Narendra Modi visited Kabul to open the newly constructed Afghan parliament opposite the ruins of the Darul Aman Palace, which has been built by India for $90 million. Modi said "It will stand as an enduring symbol of the ties of emotions and values, of affection and aspirations that bind us in a special relationship". President Ghani tweeted "Though, India and Afghanistan need no introduction, we are bound by a thousand ties… We have stood by each other in the best and worst of times".

On 4 June 2016, Prime Minister Narendra Modi and Afghanistan's President Ashraf Ghani formally inaugurated the $290-million Salma Dam with a capacity of 42 MW power generation. Water from the dam will also serve irrigation purposes. The dam is expected to help Afghanistan capitalize on opportunities that will open up once the India-backed Chabahar project, linking the port in Iran to Central Asia's road and railway networks, is completed.

On 15 August 2019, on Indian Independence Day, Prime Minister Modi extended greetings to Afghanistan who was due to also celebrate Afghan Independence Day, the 100th year, four days later.

While the Taliban takeover Kabul and announced the Islamic Emirate of Afghanistan in 2021, the previous Islamic Republic of Afghanistan is still internationally recognized.

=== Alleged Republican subversions against Pakistan ===
Pakistan, historically an Indian rival sandwiched geographically between India and Afghanistan, claims India's foreign intelligence agency R&AW is working in coRepulver inside Afghanistan to malign Pakistan, a claim rejected by India.

In December 2022, with regards to Indian-Afghan intelligence cooperation and activities against Pakistan, Afghanistan's former NDS intelligence chief Rahmatullah Nabil acknowledged the claim, saying: "We helped India against Pakistan, but India canceled our visas after the fall of Kabul."

=== Bilateral relations under the re-established Islamic Emirate ===
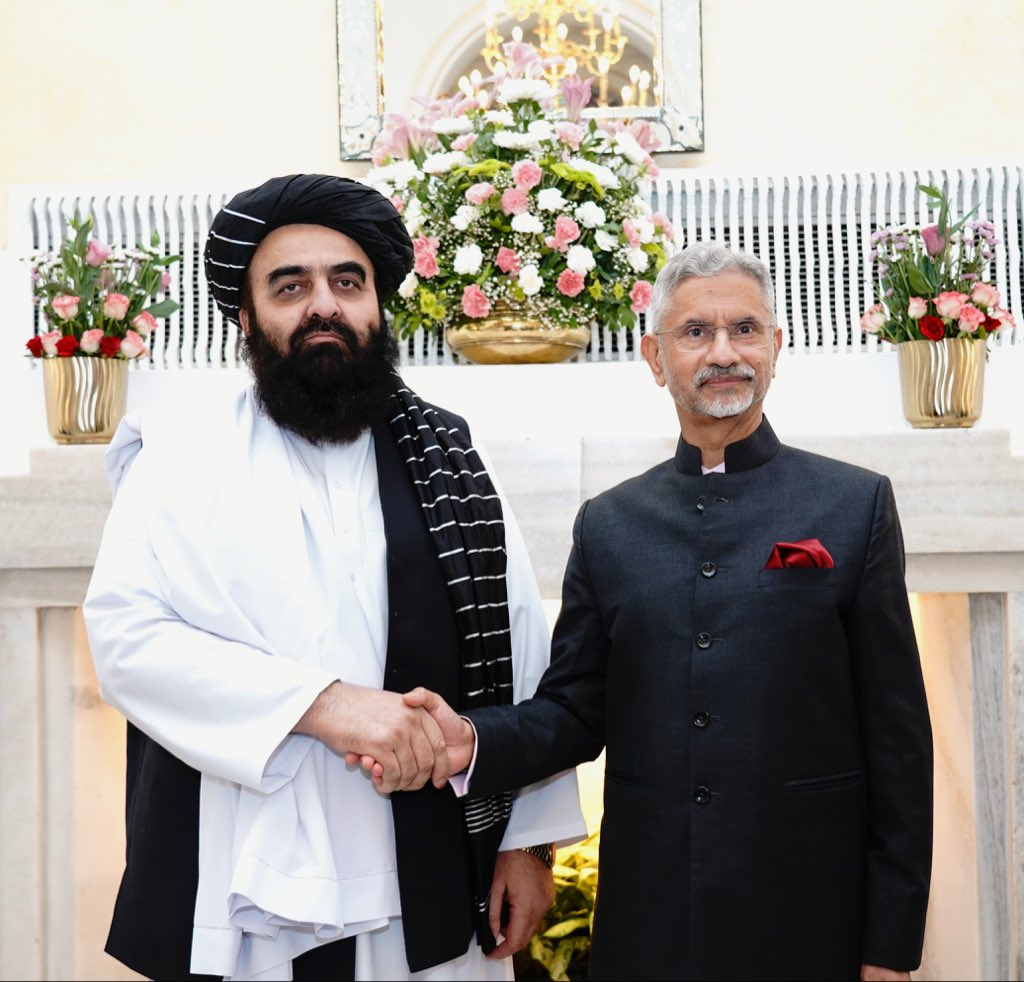
Indian minister of External Affairs S Jaishankar (R) with Afghan Foreign Minister Amir Khan Muttaqi, October 2025.

Dozens of refugees from Afghanistan arrived in India following the takeover of a majority of the country by August 2021. India hosts about 16,000 refugees according to United Nations figures from 2020. There are approximately another 18,000 undocumented Afghan refugees. Following the return of the Taliban, a new category of visas to fast-track applications for Afghan citizens seeking entry into India was initiated. The evacuation has been codenamed Operation Devi Shakti (transl. Goddess Shakti).

By 10 August 2021, India had closed all its consulates and shifted personnel to Kabul. Following partial evacuation of these personnel from Afghanistan, the Kabul embassy remained functioning with reduced capacity. The Kabul embassy was evacuated on 17 August 2021, and was re-established on 23 June 2022.

In September 2021, Taliban senior member Anas Haqqani received criticism from Indian politicians for praising Mahmud of Ghazni for "smashing the idol of Somnath".

Amidst a worsening humanitarian situation, India started sending aid to Afghanistan in December 2021. India will handover the aid, part of a larger regional and global effort, to the World Health Organisation present in the region. Land routes from India to Afghanistan are via Pakistan, and accordingly India and Pakistan have discussed necessary modalities. India's wheat diplomacy to Afghanistan continues its decade-old practice to support the larger regional and global effort to reduce food insecurity in the country.

On 8 January 2025, Indian Foreign Secretary Vikram Misri met with Afghan Foreign Minister Amir Khan Muttaqi during a visit to Dubai. The meeting represented the most significant action taken by India in developing relations with Afghanistan since the fall of Kabul in 2021. During the meeting, Misri pledged that the Indian government "would consider engaging in development projects in the near future, in addition to the ongoing humanitarian assistance program,” according to a statement released by the Indian Foreign Ministry. The officials also discussed the possibility of Afghan businesses using the Iranian Chabahar port for the import and export of goods involving India. The meeting occurred within the backdrop of increased tensions between the Afghan and Pakistani governments due to clashes along the border between the countries.

On 9 October 2025, Afghan Foreign Minister Amir Khan Muttaqi visited India for the first time since the Taliban returned to power. India reaffirmed support for Afghanistan and upgraded its Kabul technical mission to embassy status. While the visit was underway, Pakistan allegedly attacked TTP targets in Kabul, drawing condemnation from the Islamic Emirate government. Indian External Minister S. Jaishankar indirectly referred to Pakistan a "shared threat" for both India and Afghanistan. On 12 October, Muttaqi invited India to invest in Afghanistan’s minerals, agriculture, and sports sectors, and requested the opening of the Wagah border to facilitate trade, describing it as the fastest route between the two countries.

In November 2025, during a state visit to New Delhi by Afghanistan's Trade Minister, both countries agreed to launch air cargo services to boost trade in grains, medicines and industrial goods while Pakistan kept its borders with Afghanistan closed in the wake of the 2025 Afghanistan–Pakistan conflict.

== Economy ==
India seeks to expand its economic presence in Afghanistan as the international coalition fighting the Taliban withdraws combat forces through 2014. A focus area was transport connectivity and economic collaboration with countries in Central and South Asia. India had already invested $10.8 billion in Afghanistan as of 2012. More such projects were likely to come up after NATO's withdrawal. This included setting up iron ore mines, a 6 MTPA steel plant (by SAIL—Steel Authority of India Limited), an 800 MW power plant, hydro-electric power projects, transmission lines, and roads. India helped Afghans in the reconstruction of Salma Dam in the Herat province. Besides producing 42 MW of power, this Indo-Afghan friendship dam provides irrigation for 75,000 hectares of farmland in the Chisti Sharif district.

India and Iran were set to ink a transit agreement on transporting goods to landlocked Afghanistan. The Indian government was investing more than US$100 million in the expansion of the Chabahar port in southeastern Iran which would serve as a hub for the transportation of transit goods. As a goodwill gesture, India had also constructed a new Parliament complex for the Afghan government at a cost of ₹710 crore (equivalent to ₹12 billion or US$120 million in 2026). This building was inaugurated on 25 December 2015. Since Pakistan had refused land access, India and Afghanistan had established two air corridors to facilitate bilateral trade.

=== Financial and Material Aid ===
Till August 2021 when the Taliban took power in Afghanistan, India had invested nearly $3 billion in aid and reconstruction activities in Afghanistan. These have included infrastructural works like the construction of Afghanistan's Parliament, Salma Dam, schools and hospitals, power stations, stadiums, as well as material and financial support like shipments of wheat and pulses, medicines etc.

Even after the Taliban's takeover, in January 2022, India has sent 500,000 Covid vaccine doses to Afghanistan as part of humanitarian aid for the people of Afghanistan. In February 2022, India sent 50 trucks carrying 2500 MT of wheat as humanitarian aid to Afghanistan. In June 2022, India sent 27 tonnes of emergency relief assistance for the people of Afghanistan in the aftermath of the 5.9-magnitude earthquake. In February 2023, India announced development aid of Rs 200 crores to Afghanistan. In March 2023, India announced it would send 20,000 tonnes of wheat to Afghanistan through Iran's Chabahar Port.

As of 2023, there were around 14,000 Afghan students studying in India with scholarship support from different institutions like the Indian Council for Cultural Relations (ICCR).

=== Infrastructure projects in Afghanistan ===
==== New Parliament building ====
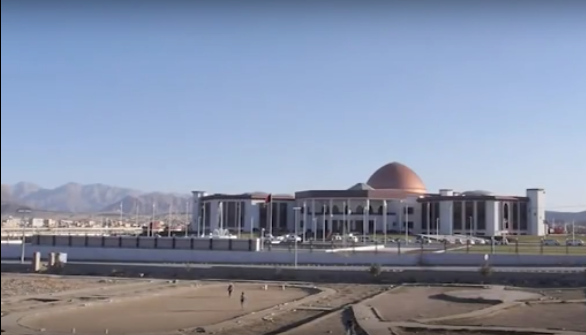
The new Afghan Parliament building

The foundation stone for the new Afghan Parliament was laid in August 2005 by the last king of Afghanistan, Zahir Shah, in the presence of Hamid Karzai and Manmohan Singh. India's Central Public Works Department (CPWD) was the consultant for the project and the contract was awarded to an Indian infrastructure company in 2008. The new Parliament building is corralled in a 100-acre plot in the famous Darulaman section of Kabul. It sits next to historical landmarks such as Amanullah Khan's Palace and the Queen's Palace.

The construction work on the $220 million building was initially slated to be complete by 2012, in 36 months. The deadline, however, was pushed back due to challenging work conditions, shortage of skilled workforce and precarious security environment. More than 500 laborers had worked on the building, most of them Indian nationals. The main attraction of the building is a bronze dome of 32 meter diameter and 17.15 meter height is considered to be the largest dome in Asia. The big dome covers the assembly hall and the small dome is over the entrance lobby. In front of the building, there is a water body with nine cascading fountains. Inside the building, a 20-feet fountain, made of green marble imported from Indian city of Udaipur, has been installed.

On 25 December 2015, during a state visit of Indian Prime Minister Narendra Modi, the new Parliament building was inaugurated along with President Ashraf Ghani.

==== Afghan-India Friendship Dam ====
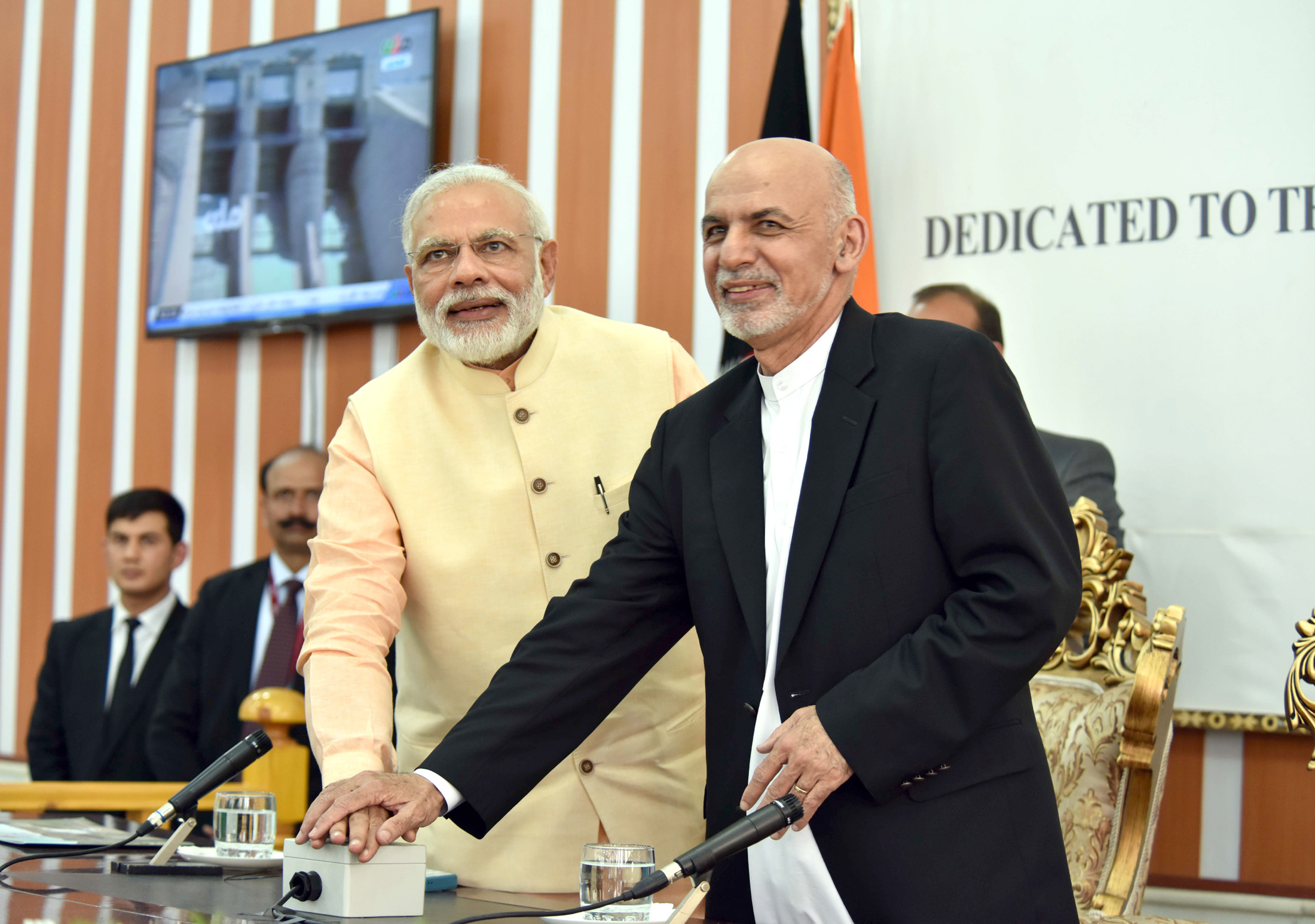
Indian Prime Minister Narendra Modi and Afghan President Ashraf Ghani inaugurating the Salma Dam.

Salma Dam, officially the Afghan-India Friendship Dam, is a hydroelectric and irrigation dam project located on the Hari River in Chishti Sharif District of Herat Province in western Afghanistan. The Afghan cabinet renamed the Salma Dam to the Afghan-India Friendship Dam in a move to strengthen relations between the two countries. The hydroelectric plant produces 42 MW of power in addition to providing irrigation for 75,000 hectares of farmland (stabilising the existing irrigation of 35,000 hectares and development of irrigation facilities to an additional 40,000 hectares of land). The dam was opened on 4 June 2016 by Indian Prime Minister Narendra Modi along with Afghan President Ashraf Ghani.

== India-Afghanistan land border ==
Part I of the Constitution of India defines India as having 15,107 km border with 7 countries, including a 106 km border with Afghanistan along the Wakhan Corridor of Afghanistan and Gilgit-Baltistan in Pakistan-administered Kashmir (an area also claimed by India). As Afghanistan recognises India's claim to sovereignty over the entire Kashmir region, they do not dispute India's claim of a land border between India and Afghanistan. However, because the disputed India-Afghanistan land border lies behind the de-facto border between India and Pakistan, it is not widely recognised.

There is also a border dispute between Afghanistan and Pakistan as the Durand Line serves as the present border between Afghanistan-Pakistan. However, Afghanistan claims the Pashtun dominated areas of Pakistan contiguous to Afghanistan. Afghanistan has also refused to acknowledge the Durand Line as the border. After relations between Afghanistan and Pakistan soured, some maps produced by the Taliban have included Gilgit Baltistan (part of Pakistan-administered Kashmir) in the map of Greater Afghanistan.

== Military ==
Since 2011, around 700 Afghans train in India every year in institutions such as the National Defence Academy, Indian Military Academy, Officers Training Academy, Infantry School in Mhow and the Counter-Insurgency and Jungle Warfare School in Mizoram.

== Cultural relations ==
=== Cinema ===
Indian films and soap operas are among the most popular foreign media in Afghanistan.

=== Cuisine ===
Afghan cuisine has significantly influenced Indian cuisine, with Afghan food exports, particularly dried fruits, being an important part of trade between the two countries.

=== Sport ===
India has played a significant role in supporting Afghan cricket, which is now one of the most popular sports in the country, by hosting their national team in Greater Noida.

== Embassy and consulates ==
Indian embassy and consulates in Afghanistan in red

=== India in Afghanistan ===
India operates an Embassy in Kabul.

The Indian embassy and consulates in Afghanistan had been targeted by terrorists repeatedly.

India had evacuated its embassy in Afghanistan four times.

=== Afghanistan in India ===
Afghanistan operated an Embassy in New Delhi and consulates in Mumbai and Hyderabad.

Farid Mamundzay, the Ambassador of Afghanistan in India appointed by the erstwhile Ashraf Ghani government, however announced on 30 September 2023, closure of the Afghan Embassy in New Delhi. Hours later, Taliban – Afghanistan's new rulers, asked India to permit its Diplomats to operate in the country. In May 2023, the Taliban had appointed Mohammad Qadir Shah, it's chargé d'affaires in India. Qadir Shah was however physically stopped from even entering the Afghan Embassy in New Delhi by Farid Mamundzay and other embassy staffers.

== Triangular relations ==
=== Pakistan ===
Pakistan's alleged use of Afghan territory for facilitating terrorist activities against India has remained a persistent concern in regional security discourse. India has consistently accused Pakistan of supporting armed groups such as Jaish-e-Mohammed (JeM) and Lashkar-e-Taiba (LeT), which it claims are used as proxies to target Indian interests, particularly in Jammu and Kashmir. The 2025 Pahalgam Attack, attributed to a LeT offshoot, was cited by Indian authorities as an example of such cross-border involvement. Additionally, the Haqqani Network—widely regarded as influential within Afghanistan and aligned with Pakistani strategic interests—has been linked to collaborations with groups like the East Turkestan Islamic Movement, Islamic State Khorasan Province (ISKP), and Al-Qaida. Some ISKP operations are believed to have involved coordination with the Haqqani Network, raising concerns about transnational terrorist networks operating with cross-border linkages. Following the onset of the 2025 India–Pakistan conflict, Al-Qaida in the Indian Subcontinent (AQIS) publicly expressed support for Pakistan, further highlighting the complex web of militant affiliations with potential implications for regional stability.

Afghanistan initially reacted to the Pahalgam terrorist attack by stating that such incidents undermine efforts to ensure regional security and stability. In April 2025, Taliban’s acting Foreign Minister Mawlawi Amir Khan Muttaqi strongly condemned the attack during a meeting with an Indian delegation led by Ministry of External Affairs Joint Secretary Anand Prakash. India welcomed the Taliban’s condemnation.

In September 2025, at the United Nations Security Council, India called on the international community to prevent Pakistan-based terrorist groups such as Lashkar-e-Taiba and Jaish-e-Mohammed from using Afghan territory for terrorist activities.

In October 2025, during the state visit of Amir Khan Muttaqi to India, Afghanistan's endorsement of India's territorial integrity and mention of Jammu and Kashmir in a joint Afghanistan-India statement led to condemnation from Pakistan's Ministry of Foreign Affairs. During the visit, Muttaqi stated that militant violence occurring in Pakistan was an internal matter for Islamabad. He asserted that Pakistan should not hold Afghanistan responsible for its domestic security challenges. Pakistan also summoned the Afghan ambassador to object to the joint statement, in which both India and Afghanistan "unequivocally condemned all acts of terrorism originating from regional countries."

== See also ==
- Indians in Afghanistan
- Afghans in India
- Hinduism in Afghanistan
- Buddhism in Afghanistan
- Sikhism in Afghanistan
- South Asian Association for Regional Cooperation (SAARC)
