= 2009 bombing of Indian embassy in Kabul =

Suicide bomb attack

Coordinates: 34°31′40″N 69°09′53″E

2009 Kabul Indian embassy bombing
- Part of the Taliban insurgency
- Kabul (Afghanistan)
- Location: Embassy of India, Malalai Watt, Shahr-e-Nau, Kabul, Afghanistan
- Date: 8 October 2009; 8:30 a.m. local time. (0400 GMT) –
- Target: Indian embassy
- Attack type: Suicide car bomb
- Deaths: 17
- Injuries: 83
- Perpetrator: Taliban

The 2009 bombing of the Indian embassy was a suicide bomb attack on the Indian embassy in Kabul, Afghanistan on 8 October 2009 at 8:30 am local time. The bombing, claimed by the Taliban, killed 17 people and wounded 83.

== Background ==
The bomb came following a spike in such attacks in Afghanistan and amid debate in NATO countries about sending more ISAF troops to fight in "Operation Enduring Freedom".

India believed its longtime alliance with Afghanistan, as well as its political and cultural ties, made it less of a target than some Western powers. However, this confidence had been shattered in an attack the previous year where a bombing at the embassy killed more than 50 people and injured more than 100.

== Bombing ==
The attacker struck at about 8:30 a.m. when the street—where the embassy and the Afghan Interior Ministry face each other—is normally busy with pedestrians. The Indian foreign secretary said that the attackers "came up to the outside perimeter wall of the embassy with a car loaded with explosives, obviously with the aim of targeting the embassy." However, blast walls built since the previous bombing deflected the force of the explosion. The bomb blew out doors and windows at the embassy but caused no loss of life inside. Though there was damage to the watch tower there was no damage to chancery premises. The bombing was said to be of the same intensity as the previous years bombing.

An Interior Ministry spokesman, Zemeri Bashary, said the explosion was a suicide bomb, without providing additional details. A bystander, Ahmadullah, said "We heard a big explosion, and smoke was everywhere. They pulled out several dead civilians and a few dozen wounded. One of my friends in [a nearby] house was injured by all the flying glass." Another witness, Nik Mohammad, who was driving in the area, said that the road shook violently and he saw at least four vehicles badly damaged.

== Casualties ==
All of the people killed were locals, and a few Indians were injured in the attack. India's ambassador to Afghanistan Jayant Prasad said that a few Indian security personnel were slightly injured. Indian Reports alleged that Pakistan's ISI was involved.

== Responsibility ==
Within hours of the attack the Taliban claimed responsibility confirming suspicions that the Indian Embassy was the target. A Taliban spokesperson said the attacker was an Afghan man who blew up his sports utility vehicle laden with explosives just outside the embassy.

G. Parthasarathy, a former diplomat and analyst at the Centre for Policy Research, said that although it was too early to point fingers there was a clear indication that the Taliban sees Indian economic assistance as complementary to American strategic objectives. He said that "Therefore, Indians are targeted. Add to that, their Pakistani mentors are not too happy with our (sic) presence in Afghanistan." Phunchok Stobdan, a senior fellow at the Institute for Defence Studies and Analyses, also said that despite being the apparent target of the attack and some prior pressure from Washington to back off, given Pakistani sensitivities—India is still not likely to walk away from its Afghan commitments which include $1.1 billion in ongoing development projects. He said, "No one in India is willing to sacrifice Afghanistan for the sake of Af-Pak strategy. India-Afghan relations are very strong and very old, even during the British period."

India's previous accusations against the Pakistani spy agency were again brought to fore as speculation started that the ISI may have been involved.

== International reaction ==
- Afghanistan – President Hamid Karzai's office condemned the attack, adding that civilians accounted for most of the injured. The Foreign Affairs Ministry also condemned the attack on Indian television.
- United States – The U.S. ambassador to India, Timothy Roemer said: "Our heart goes out to India, to the victims of terrorism and our prayers are with the people of India today. I want to extend both to the Foreign Secretary and to the people of India the United States of America's support to India, its concern about this bombing which is deeply troubling and as we find out more details we will have more to say."

== See also ==
- List of attacks on diplomatic missions
- List of massacres in Afghanistan
