= Jayant Prasad =

Indian civil servant (born 1952)

Jayant Prasad, IFS

Director General, Institute for Defence Studies and Analyses
- In office September 2015 – September 2018
- Preceded by: Arvind Gupta
- Succeeded by: Sujan R. Chinoy

Personal details
- Born: 5 June 1952 (age 74)
- Spouse: Bhupinder Prasad
- Children: 2
- Education: St Stephen's College, Delhi; Delhi University; Jawaharlal Nehru University
- Occupation: retired diplomat of (IFS)

Jayant Prasad is a retired Indian diplomat of the Indian Foreign Service who served as the Director General of the Delhi-based Institute for Defence Studies and Analyses, a think-tank affiliated with the Indian Ministry of Defence between September 2015 and September 2018.

== Early life and education ==
Jayant Prasad was born on 5 June 1952 to historian Bimal Prasad. After completing his schooling from Modern School, he studied at St. Stephen's College, Delhi, and obtained his Bachelor of Arts degree. He secured a master's degree in history from Jawaharlal Nehru University in 1974. After lecturing on modern Indian history for two years at St. Stephen's College, Delhi University, he entered the Indian Foreign Service in 1976.

== Career ==
=== Postings at Indian missions ===
In Indian Missions abroad, he has served as India's Permanent Representative to the Conference on Disarmament, Geneva (2004-2007), Ambassador to Algeria; Counsellor for trade access and development cooperation at the Indian Mission to the European Union in Brussels, First Secretary in the Permanent Mission of India to the United Nations, Geneva and Second Secretary in the Embassy of India in Paris. He was Ambassador to Afghanistan at the time of the 2008 and 2009 Kabul Indian embassy attacks.

He also served as an Indian ambassador to Nepal from 25 August 2011 – 25 August 2013, a post that was earlier held by his father, Bimal Prasad from 1991 to 1994. This was his last posting abroad prior to retirement.

=== Postings in Delhi ===
In the Ministry of External Affairs (MEA), New Delhi, he has served as head of the Americas Division from 2000 to 2004, head of the unit on Multilateral Economic Relations, Staff Officer to the Foreign Secretary, Deputy Secretary for Disarmament Affairs and Desk Officer for Bangladesh.

== Other positions held ==
He was member of U.N. Secretary-General's Advisory Board on Disarmament Matters (2005–07), and Rapporteur of the U.N. Commission on Human Rights, Geneva (1986–87). He was a Fellow at the Weatherhead Center for International Affairs, Harvard University from 1998 to 1999 where he worked on a research project to study new parameters of India's foreign policy and to delineate India's strategic and technological environment through the year 2010. He was appointed Director General of the Institute for Defence Studies and Analysis (IDSA) in September 2015.
