= Bimal Prasad =

Indian historian (1923–2015)

Prof Bimal Prasad

Ambassador to Nepal
- In office 1991–1995
- Preceded by: Lt. Gen. (Retd.) S.K. Sinha, PVSM

Professor of South Asian Studies, JNU

Personal details
- Born: 1923
- Died: 4 November 2015 (aged 92) New Delhi, India
- Citizenship: Indian
- Children: Jayant Prasad, Sujata Prasad, Sanjay Prasad
- Education: Patna University, Columbia University
- Occupation: Academician

Bimal Prasad (1923 – 4 November 2015) was an Indian historian known for his scholarship on modern Indian history. He was Indian ambassador to Nepal during 1991-1995.

== Academic career ==
Prasad was professor of history at University of Patna, Patna and then South Asian Studies at Jawaharlal Nehru University. He served as Dean, School of International Studies.

An intellectual with socialist inclinations, Prasad was associated with Jayaprakash Narayan's mass movement in 1974-75, and has written / edited several books on Narayan.

He is known for his postcolonial analysis of the Indian independence movement, particularly his work on the evolving foreign policy of the Indian National Congress, and for his work on communal relations during the British Raj. He wrote several analyses of Foreign Affairs in the South Asian region.

In addition to books, he contributed to many journals and volumes on modern Indian history.

== Indian Ambassador to Nepal ==
Prasad has had a long interest in the origins and ramifications of India's foreign policy, and his work on pre-independence foreign policy was a classic of postcolonial history. He is known as an expert on relations within South Asia, and has had personal connections with many leaders from the region.

After retirement, he was appointed ambassador to Nepal by prime minister Chandrashekhar (1991–1995). He claimed not to have enjoyed the office:

I was a simple professor ... But the way they talked about me made me feel that I had become very important in my life.

During his tenure, he worked with Indian prime ministers P V Narasimha Rao and his Nepali counterpart Girija Prasad Koirala to enhance India's aid to Nepal. The BP Koirala Nepal India Foundation was also set up in this period.

His son, Jayant Prasad, who also served as Indian ambassador to Nepal, is currently Director General of the Institute for Defence Studies and Analyses.

== Other activities ==
For some time he also served as director, Gandhian Institute, Varanasi. He was the honorary director of the Rajendra Prasad Academy, and a fellow with the Nehru Memorial Museum and Library in New Delhi. He was also the chairman of the Rajendra Bhawan Trust. In addition, he was chairman of the National Gandhi Museum and President of the Indian council for South Asian co-operation. He has been awarded national fellowship by the Indian Council for Social Science Research.

== Books ==
- Selected works of Jayaprakash Narayan, ed. Bimal Prasad 1964
- The origins of Indian foreign policy: the Indian National Congress and world affairs, 1885-1947, Bimal Prasad, 1962
- Indo-Soviet relations, 1947-1972: a documentary study, Bimal Prasad, 1973
- India's foreign policy: studies in continuity and change, ed. Bimal Prasad, 1979
- A revolutionary's quest: selected writings of Jayaprakash Narayan, 1980
- Gandhi, Nehru & J.P.: studies in leadership, Bimal Prasad 1985
- Regional cooperation in South Asia: problems & prospects, Bimal Prasad, 1989
- Prospects for Greater Cooperation in South Asia: the Political Dimensions, Bimal Prasad, 1996
- Pathways to India’s Partition, vol I: The Foundations of Muslim Nationalism, Bimal Prasad, 1999
- Pathway to India's Partition vol II: A nation within a nation, Bimal Prasad 2000
- Jayaprakash Narayan: 1939-1946, Bimal Prasad, 2003
