= 2008 bombing of Indian embassy in Kabul =

Suicide bomb terrorist attack

Coordinates: 34.533°N 69.166°E

2008 Embassy bombing in Kabul
- The blast site outside the Indian embassy in Kabul
- Location: Embassy of India, Malalai Watt, Shahr-e-Nau, Kabul, Afghanistan
- Date: 7 July 2008; 8:30 a.m. local time. (0400 GMT) –
- Target: Indian embassy
- Attack type: Suicide car bomb
- Deaths: 58
- Injuries: 141
- Perpetrators: Taliban (suspected), ISI (suspected)

The 2008 Indian embassy bombing in Kabul was a suicide bomb terror attack on the Indian embassy in Kabul, Afghanistan on 7 July 2008 at 8:30 AM local time. The bombing killed 58 people and wounded 141. The suicide car bombing took place near the gates of the embassy during morning hours when officials enter the embassy.

Unnamed U.S. CIA officials suggested to The New York Times that Pakistan's ISI had planned the attack. Pakistan denied this claim.

According to British journalist Christina Lamb, United States President George W. Bush confronted Pakistani prime minister Yusuf Raza Gilani and stated that in the case of another such attack he would have to take "serious action". Gilani promised to investigate the attack. Subsequently, Pakistani foreign ministry spokesman Mohammed Sadiq described The New York Times report as "total rubbish" and said there was no evidence of ISI involvement.

== Background ==
During the United States-led invasion of Afghanistan in 2001, India offered intelligence and other forms of support to the coalition forces. After the overthrow of the Taliban, India established diplomatic relations with the newly elected democratic government, provided aid and participated in Afghanistan's reconstruction efforts through the construction of roads, railways, electricity transmission lines, schools and hospitals. Indo-Afghan relations strengthened in the wake of Afghanistan's persisting tensions and problems with Pakistan, which is widely believed to shelter and support the Taliban. Both India and Afghanistan also developed strategic and military cooperation against the insurgency. India pursued a policy of close cooperation with Afghanistan in order to gain friendly influence in Central Asia as well as to keep a check on Kashmiri militants that it claims are operating from the Afghanistan-Pakistan region. India also provides training to Afghan National Army officers and military personnel at its training institutions, including the National Defence Academy and the School of Artillery at Devlali. India has also helped Afghanistan in "capacity-building" by training Afghan pilots and technicians in operating Russian-origin Mi-35 helicopter gunships. India is also a supplier of military parts for Soviet-era Afghan tanks and aircraft.

By 2007, India had pledged US$850 million to Afghan reconstruction efforts, the largest amount from any country without a military presence in Afghanistan, and later scaled up the aid to more than US$1 billion. India is currently the largest regional donor of humanitarian aid and reconstruction efforts in post-Taliban Afghanistan. About 3,000 Indians are estimated to be working on various reconstruction and developmental projects in Afghanistan, and they have often been subjected to attacks by Taliban insurgents. In November 2005, after an incident in which an Indian national was kidnapped and murdered, India deployed 200 soldiers of the elite Indo-Tibetan Border Police (ITBP) to provide security for Indian nationals and the projects supported by India. By 2008, ITBP's presence in Afghanistan was steadily increased to over 400 personnel.

India's growing influence in Afghanistan upset Pakistan and other pro-Taliban elements. The Times said in an editorial that with the United States and other NATO members unwilling to sustain long-term commitments to Afghanistan, the Taliban saw India as the only regional enemy capable of resisting them.

=== Other attacks on Indian interests ===
According to The New York Times, India's external ministry officials had been raising the issue of security of Indian personnel in Afghanistan for the past several months. The Indian consulate in Jalalabad was attacked twice by hand grenades in 2007. One soldier of the Indo-Tibetan Border Police (ITBP) was killed and four others injured in an attack by the Taliban on 5 June 2008. In the aftermath of the attack, India's Home Ministry cautioned its ITBP personnel to take necessary precautionary measures and also to remain at guard against fidayeen (suicide bomber) attacks. It also noted that the security being provided by the Afghan Police was "not up to the mark". In spite of these efforts, the embassy bombing of 2008 was later followed up by the 2009 Kabul Indian embassy attack and the February 2010 Kabul attack on Indian citizens and interests in Afghanistan.

== The bombing ==
The car bomb detonated at approximately 8:30 a.m. local time on 7 July 2008. The Indian embassy, which is in the center of Kabul, is located across the street from the office of the Interior Ministry of the Government of Afghanistan and is close to several other government buildings. The bombing occurred on a busy, tree-lined street where people usually line up at the embassy gates to apply for visas to India. An explosive-packed Toyota Camry, driven by the suicide bomber, rammed into two Indian diplomatic vehicles entering the embassy and detonated. The gates to the embassy were blown off and the walls of some buildings in its compound were damaged. A plume of smoke and dust was seen rising from the center of Kabul city, and the explosion was heard several miles away. Several nearby shopkeepers also became immediate victims of the attack, and the nearby Indonesian embassy also suffered damage. Kabul Police immediately sealed off the area.

A statement released by the Afghan interior ministry said, "The initial findings of the ministry show that the main target of this attack has not been security forces like in most attacks but has been particularly planned to target the Indian embassy". There was immediate confusion and panic in the Indian embassy after the bomb blasts. According to a CNN reporter, a man who answered the phone at the Indian embassy abruptly hung up, saying, "We are not fine. All communications have been cut off". The Ministry of External Affairs of Government of India was reported to be in touch with India's ambassador to Afghanistan, Jayant Prasad. The Indian ambassador and his deputy were inside the building complex at the time of the explosion but were not hurt. Indian External Affairs Minister, Pranab Mukherjee, called for an emergency meeting of officials in Delhi after the bomb attack to review security arrangements. An anonymous person reported that rumours said the Indian embassy had previously received bomb threats.

== Casualties ==
Most of the 58 dead were locals and included two top Indian officials. Indian Army Brigadier Ravi Datt Mehta was entering the embassy gates in a car along with V. Venkateswara Rao when the attack took place. Both were killed in the blast.

=== Indian casualties ===
- Brigadier Ravi Datt Mehta had been assigned a key role as defence attaché, serving as part of India's military training and logistical help to Afghanistan, and was posted in Kabul for six months. He was said to have a "good relationship" with Afghan defence minister Abdul Rahim Wardak. During his tenure in the Indian Army, which he commenced with the class of June 1976, he had gained experience in counter-insurgency operations in both Jammu and Kashmir and North-East India. An Indian media report claimed that the main reason for Mehta's targeting by the terrorists was his key role in training the Afghan military and in closely tracking links between the Taliban and Pakistan's Inter-Service Intelligence.
- V. Venkateswara Rao was an Indian Foreign Service officer of the class of 1990 and was working as an Indian press counselor in the Afghan mission.
- Two Indian officers of the Indo-Tibetan Border Police, Ajai Pathania and Roop Singh, were also killed in the blast.

An Indian Air Force IL-76 aircraft was sent to Kabul to retrieve the four bodies.

=== Casualties from other states ===
Six Afghan police constables were killed and five others sustained injuries. An Afghan Indian Embassy employee by the name of Niamutullah was also killed in the blast. The five Afghan guards outside the Indonesian Embassy were killed, and two Indonesian diplomats were injured in the attack.

== Investigations ==
Afghanistan's intelligence agency Riyast-i-Amniyat-i-Milli, India's Research and Analysis Wing and the United States' CIA are reported to be scanning vast volumes of intercepted communications and questioning informants to find some clues. According to CNN-IBN, Indian and Afghan agencies believe that the Pakistani Army's 324 Military Intelligence Battalion based in Peshawar had planned the attack on the Indian embassy and executed it in collaboration with either the Taliban or al-Qaida. Afghanistan's Interior Minister has stated that the suicide bombers were trained in Pakistan.

India's ambassador to Afghanistan, Jayant Prasad, stated that, after reviewing the scene, the main target of the attack was believed to be the Indian embassy building. He also added that, considering the huge amount of explosives used in the attack, it was clear that target was not top Indian diplomatic officials but the embassy itself. Bomb scene review further revealed that the embassy guard killed in the attack had his hand on the closed gates. The ambassador stated that it is likely that the guard did not open the gate because he saw a suspicious car driving behind an embassy vehicle. The suicide attacker then might have decided to explode his device near the gate rather than inside the embassy's compound. According to investigating officials, much of the impact was taken up by the sand filled blast barriers. These barriers, which were built across the embassy for added protection just one week before the blast, saved it from structural damage.

An investigative report in the Times of India identified the attacker as "22-year-old Hamza Shakoor from Gujranwala district in Pakistan," citing unnamed sources. It also claimed that "intelligence about an imminent attack was remarkably precise, giving an indication about the centres of planning and execution." US Secretary of Defense Robert Gates added that the US was offering help to Afghan and Indian governments to investigate further. Soon American officials came to believe that the attack was conducted by the Haqqani network, a Taliban group led by Maulavi Jalaluddin Haqqani from Pakistan.

=== Pakistani involvement ===
On 13 July India stated their suspicions about the ISI's involvement in the attack. India's National Security Advisor M.K. Narayanan said, "We have no doubt that the ISI is behind this."

On 1 August 2008, United States intelligence officials said that the Pakistani intelligence services helped the Haqqani network plan the attack. Their conclusions were based on intercepted communications between Pakistani intelligence officers and the perpetrators before the attack. CIA deputy director Stephen R. Kappes had visited Islamabad before the attack to confront senior Pakistani officials with information about support provided by members of the ISI to militant groups. The officials said that the ISI officers involved had not been renegades, indicating that their actions might have been authorised by superiors in the Pakistan Army. It confirmed suspicions that were long held, an 'aha moment'.

US officials also called into question the reliability of Pakistan as an ally in the American war on terror. According to an article by British journalist Christina Lamb, President George W. Bush confronted Pakistani prime minister Yusuf Raza Gillani in Washington D.C., with evidence of ISI's involvement in the Kabul attack and warned that in case of another attack he would have to take "serious action".

=== Motivations ===
During the Taliban regime in Afghanistan, which was backed by Pakistan, India had supported the Northern Alliance that opposed the Taliban. After the fall of the Taliban in 2001, India opened four consulates in Herat, Mazari Sharif, Kandahar and Jalalabad and backed Hamid Karzai's national government as well as the US-led ISAF against the Taliban insurgency. India is Afghanistan's fifth-largest bilateral donor and its growing presence in post-war Afghanistan has caused much concern to the Taliban and Pakistan as it views Indian measures as a threat to its influence in the region. The President of Pakistan, Pervez Musharraf, had accused Afghan President Hamid Karzai of "favouring" India. Islamabad had also reportedly accused Indian consulates in Kandahar and Jalalabad of providing support to insurgents in Pakistan's troubled Balochistan region, a claim repeated by Urdu newspapers to conservative and hardline Islamic constituents in the Afghanistan-Pakistan region. Coupled with Pakistan's old and documented animosity towards India, analysts claim Pakistan had strong motives to target Indian nationals and their economic projects in Afghanistan.

The statement by Afghan President Hamid Karzai noted that "enemies of Afghan–India ties were behind attack" without clearly specifying which enemies. On 7 July 2008, Afghanistan's Interior Ministry claimed that the attack was carried in collaboration with "a regional intelligence service" and added that the bombers received training in Pakistan. Afghanistan has in the past blamed its neighbour Pakistan and its intelligence service ISI for various terror incidents on its soil.

Denying its involvement in the attacks, a Taliban spokesman said in a statement, "they (India) send secret military experts to Afghanistan and they train the Afghan army. Had we carried out the attack, we would have claimed responsibility for it with pride since we have good reasons for it." The spokesman also implicated Pakistan instead and further stated that the attack had its roots in the regional India–Pakistan rivalry. On 8 July, Afghanistan stated that it had no doubts that the attack was carried out in collaboration with "foreign intelligence agencies", again an implicit reference to Pakistan's ISI. Pakistani prime minister Yusaf Raza Gilani denied any involvement of ISI in the attack and also remarked that his country had no interest in destabilising Afghanistan. Subsequently, there have been reports of Afghan officials blaming Pakistan directly and explicitly for the attack on the Indian embassy. Indian security analysts at the Institute of Conflict Management have claimed that "the ISI-backed Taliban will not allow any Indian consolidation in Afghanistan, nor will they allow any stability in Kabul."

=== Denials by Pakistan ===
Immediately after the report in The New York Times, Pakistani foreign ministry spokesman Mohammed Sadiq described it as "total rubbish" and said there was no evidence of ISI involvement. "The foreign newspapers keep writing such things against ISI, and we reject these allegations." On 15 October, in an India-Pakistan bilateral meeting to address cross-border terrorism and ceasefire violations, Islamabad denied any role of the ISI in the 7 July bombings. Pakistan's National Security Advisor Mahmud Ali Durrani denied involvement when asked to comment on reports alleging that ISI masterminded the Kabul blasts. It was also clarified that the Kabul bombings will be discussed in detail at the meeting of the joint anti-terror mechanism later the same month.

On 23 October, it was reported that India had shared sensitive information with Pakistan that pointed towards the ISI's alleged complicity in the embassy bombing as both countries ended a special meeting of their joint-terror mechanism on a "positive" note.

== Further threats to Indian nationals ==
A bomb was found on a bus transporting 12 Indian road construction workers of Border Roads Organization to Afghanistan on 8 July 2008 in Zaranj, Nimruz, a day after the attack on Indian embassy in Kabul. The engineers and workers on board reported having noticed a "suspicious package" after boarding the bus on the day, but it was only after further investigation that it was revealed that a remote-operated bomb had been placed on board. Provincial governor Ghulam Dastgir Azad placed the blame for the attempted bombing of the workers on Taliban militants, who have been responsible for more than a dozen worker deaths in the area over the last few years.

== Calls for Indian military intervention ==
After this attack, some defence analysts called for India to increase its military presence in Afghanistan not only to protect Indian projects and nationals there, but also to aid the coalition forces to improve the overall security situation in the war-torn country. Gurmeet Kanwal, head of the Center for Land Warfare Studies, said, "I would say the time has come to live up to our responsibility. If it involves military intervention, so be it." C. Raja Mohan, an Indian foreign policy analyst, urged India's government to increase military presence in Afghanistan and also added "Afghanistan needs to be stabilised. Pakistan needs to be stabilised. This requires more drastic remedies." In April 2008 Afghanistan's defense minister formally requested India's help in counter-insurgency operations during his visit to New Delhi. India has already provided large-scale military equipment to the Afghan National Army and has also given crucial intelligence inputs to the United States-led coalition forces. Several members of the Afghan army have undergone anti-terrorist training in India and in April 2007, the Indian Army also sent a delegation to set up an army training school in Afghanistan and Uzbekistan. In September 2007, India held a joint military exercise with the United Kingdom to train British forces in counter-insurgency operations, particularly those in Afghanistan. India also has an operational air force command at the Farkhor Air Base in neighbouring Tajikistan. Indian Express said in an editorial, "after the Kabul bombing, India must come to terms with an important question that it has avoided debating so far. New Delhi cannot continue to expand its economic and diplomatic activity in Afghanistan, while avoiding a commensurate increase in its military presence there. For too long, New Delhi has deferred to Pakistani and American sensitivities about raising India's strategic profile in Afghanistan." However, some analysts have feared that if India joins the United States-led coalition forces in Afghanistan, it would harm the soft power it has gradually built in the region as a result of the widespread popularity of Bollywood films and Indian television soaps among Afghans.

== Reactions ==
=== India ===
The primary response of Indian government at that time was strong condemnations of the incidence. Pranab Mukherjee, India's External Affairs Minister, condemned the "cowardly terrorists' attack" and added that "such acts of terror will not deter us from fulfilling our commitments to the government and people of Afghanistan." India also rushed a high-level emergency team of experts to review the situation.

Indian Prime Minister Manmohan Singh said, "the target is clearly the innocent citizens. Efforts to spread chaos and disturb peace will not be allowed to succeed at any cost. The government is determined to defeat nefarious designs of terrorist elements. The perpetrators of these heinous acts will be dealt with firmly. The security agencies are already working in this regard. All sections of society are required to remain calm and extend fullest co-operation to them."

=== Afghanistan ===
Afghan Foreign Minister Rangeen Dadfar Spanta visited the embassy soon after the attack to show his support. His ministry's spokesman, Sultan Ahmad Baheen, said, "the enemies of Afghanistan and India's relationship cannot hamper our relationship by conducting such attacks". He added, "India and Afghanistan have a deep relationship between each other. Such attacks of the enemy will not harm our relations."

A statement released by the Afghan foreign ministry said, "the government of the Islamic Republic of Afghanistan strongly condemns today's terrorist attack on the embassy of the friendly and brother country of India". Afghan President Hamid Karzai later called Prime Minister of India Manmohan Singh and expressed his condolences. On 14 July Karzai declared whom he believed to be the foreign state behind the attack, stating, "Now this has become clear. And we have told the government of Pakistan that the killings of people in Afghanistan, the destruction of bridges in Afghanistan ... are carried out by Pakistan's intelligence and Pakistan's military departments."

=== Pakistan ===
In a statement, Foreign Minister Shah Mehmood Qureshi condemned the bombing at the Indian embassy in Kabul, stating that "Pakistan condemns terrorism in all its forms and manifestations as this menace negates the very essence of human values". A spokesman for Pakistan's foreign ministry also dismissed claims of Pakistan's involvement in the attack as "total rubbish".

=== International ===
On behalf of states around the world, their respective representatives commented on both the attack and the resulting casualties:

- Armenia – The Armenian Foreign Ministry said, "with deep indignation we learned about the terrorist act near the Indian embassy in Kabul which took lives of tens of peaceful people. Among the innocent victims are our partners working in the Indian embassy."
- Australia – Foreign Minister Stephen Smith said the Australian government "condemns the car bomb attack ... and extends its deep sympathies to the Afghan government and people and to the Indian government and people." He went on to add "This attack further demonstrates their determination to kill, maim and intimidate the Afghan people and to undermine international efforts to bring peace and stability to Afghanistan."
- Bulgaria – Bulgarian President Georgi Parvanov said, "Bulgaria categorically condemns this cruel act of terrorism." He went on to say that he hoped the attack "will not dissuade India from actively supporting the reconstruction of Afghanistan, a process in which Bulgaria is also closely involved."
- Canada – David Emerson, Minister of Foreign Affairs, condemned the attack, saying, "Previous attacks have not broken the will of Afghans or of the international community. We are heartened by India’s determined response to continue meeting its substantial commitment to Afghanistan."
- Nepal – Foreign Affairs Ministry said, "the Nepal Government strongly condemns the heinous act of terrorism."
- China – Before the 2008 G8 summit, Chinese Premier Hu Jintao told Indian Prime Minister Manmohan Singh, "We strongly denounce the terrorist attack on the Indian embassy. I sincerely express my heartfelt condolences to the families of those killed in the bombing in Afghanistan."
- Russia – Russian Foreign Ministry spokesman Andrei Nesterenko said, "Our hearts go out to the victims' families and relatives, and we express our support to those injured in this inhuman act. We grieve over the death of our colleagues, Indian diplomats. We resolutely condemn the terrorists' savage attacks and we are convinced that they will be given a worthy rebuff."
- Singapore – The Foreign Ministry said, "we condemn this act of terror and pledge our full support to India in your fight against this scourge."
- United Kingdom – British foreign secretary David Miliband said he "was appalled to hear the news". Adding that these were "cowardly actions carried out by those with no regard for human life" and that such acts "are designed to undermine the efforts of democratic governments and the international community to bring peace and stability to the region".
- United States of America – US State Department spokesman Sean McCormack described the bombing as "terrible news" and said, "we have offered any assistance, not only to Afghan but also to Indian authorities, in terms of follow-up, determining who's responsible for these attacks." White House spokesman Gordon Johndroe said in a statement, "the US stands with the people of Afghanistan as well as India, as we face this common enemy."
- Vietnam – Foreign Ministry spokesman Le Dung said, "Vietnam strongly condemns the brutal terrorist attack on the Indian Embassy in Kabul, Afghanistan on 7 July, killing many civilians. We would like to extend our profound condolences to the victims' families."

==== Organisations ====
- European Union – The European Union described the bombing as a "terrorist attack targeting innocent civilians". EU foreign policy chief Javier Solana added that "Such actions, which are clearly intended to undermine the process of stabilisation and reconstruction in Afghanistan, will achieve nothing."
- NATO – NATO Secretary General Jaap de Hoop Scheffer said in a statement, "On behalf of NATO, I wholeheartedly condemn the bombing at the Indian Embassy. The loss of life and injuries to so many is a tragedy, and a clear attempt to undermine regional relations."
- United Nations – Kai Eide, the special envoy of UN Secretary General to Afghanistan said, "I condemn it in the strongest possible terms. In no culture, no country, and no religion is there any excuse or justification for such acts. The total disregard for innocent lives is staggering and those behind this must be held responsible." UN Secretary General Ban Ki-moon also condemned the attack "in the strongest terms." The Security Council also described the attack as a "reprehensible act of terrorism."

== See also ==
- Foreign relations of Afghanistan
- List of massacres in Afghanistan
