= Phunchok Stobdan =

Indian diplomat (1958–2026)

Indian Ambassador to Kyrgyzstan
- In office 2010–2012
- Preceded by: J.S. Pande

Personal details
- Born: 20 December 1958
- Died: 19 April 2026 (aged 67)
- Occupation: Diplomat, civil servant

Phunchok Stobdan (20 December 1958 – 19 April 2026) was an Indian civil servant and diplomat who served as the Indian ambassador to Kyrgyzstan. He was also a senior fellow at Institute for Defence Studies and Analyses, New Delhi, and was the founding president of the Ladakh International Centre.

Stobdan was an academician, diplomat and author, who earlier served in the National Security Council Secretariat (NSCS), which reports to National Security Advisor. Stobdan was the author of the book The Great Game in the Buddhist Himalayas: India and China’s Quest for Strategic Dominance. The book looks at China–India relations through prism of Buddhist Himalayas. Stobdan also wrote columns for The Indian Express and The Tribune (Chandigarh).

Stobdan died on 19 April 2026, at the age of 67.
