= Safi Landmark Hotel =

Hotel in Kabul, Afghanistan

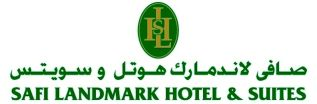
- Interactive map of the Safi Landmark Hotel area

General information
- Location: Shahr-e Naw, Kabul, Afghanistan
- Coordinates: 34°31′57″N 69°09′54″E
- Opening: 2005

Other information
- Number of rooms: 90 rooms

Website
- www.safilandmarkhotelsuites.com

Safi Landmark Hotel is a four star hotel, in Kabul, Afghanistan. It was opened in 2005 with the attached Kabul City Center mall.

The hotel has nine floors and contains 90 rooms, according to SnapTravel.

The Safi Landmark hotel is located in downtown Kabul near governmental offices, ministries, UN and embassies. It is approximately 15 minutes by road from Kabul International Airport.

== Incidents ==
The hotel was near the site of a suicide attack on February 26, 2010, that killed 17 people, to which the Taliban spokesman Zabiullah Mujahid claimed the group's responsibility. The hotel was targeted again in another suicide bombing on February 14, 2011, at its entrance, killing three guards. The hotel was at the time frequented by foreigners.
