= Ravi Datt Mehta =

Indian Army general officer (1954 / 1955 –2008)

Brigadier Ravi Datt Mehta KC
- Born: c. July 1954 – c. July 1955; Himachal Pradesh, India
- Died: July 7, 2008 (aged 53); Kabul, Afghanistan
- Military career
- Allegiance: India
- Branch: Indian Army
- Service years: 1976–2008
- Rank: Brigadier
- Service number: IC-31794
- Unit: Military Intelligence
- Awards: Kirti Chakra

Brigadier Ravi Datt Mehta, KC (1954 / 1955 – 7 July 2008) was a flag officer in the Indian Army. He died in the suicide bombing of the Indian Embassy in Kabul while serving as India's Defence Attaché to Afghanistan on 7 July 2008. He was awarded the Kirti Chakra, India's second highest gallantry award.

== Early life and military career ==
The Indian Express states that he was a math wizard in his younger days. He joined the Indian Army in 1976 and went on to become a highly rated officer. His selection as defence attaché in Kabul is said to have followed an intensive screening process that shortlists the candidate pool to unofficially the "top three" officers of the Indian Army, prior to making the final selection for the job.

He had proficiency in many languages, including Pashto, Mandarin and Tibetan. His work as defence attaché in Kabul was praised in both Indian media and Pakistani media. In the words of a columnist for Dawn, he was: "an affable defence attaché who was popular with Indian expatriates and local Afghans alike."

It is speculated that he was targeted, allegedly by the Taliban and its state-run de facto intelligence service, Pakistan's Inter Services Intelligence (ISI), due to his close monitoring of the re-established links between those two organizations, and due to his significant role in training the Afghan army. He was said to have a "good relationship" with Afghan defence minister Abdul Rahim Wardak. Brig. Mehta had earlier also served as the head of the Indian Army's Intelligence Corps in the state of Jammu and Kashmir.

== Legacy and honours ==
A road in his hometown Shimla near his childhood home was posthumously renamed in his honour. He was also slated to be posthumously awarded the Kirti Chakra, India's second-highest peacetime gallantry award. His funeral was attended by Chief of Army Staff General Deepak Kapoor, Chief of Naval Staff Admiral Suresh Mehta and Chief of the Air Staff Fali Homi Major.

Brigadier Mehta's wife was also working in Afghanistan for empowerment of women during his stay there. Brigadier Mehta has a son who was then serving in the Indian Air Force as a fighter pilot.

== Kirti Chakra Citation ==
The Kirti Chakra citation on the Official Indian Army Website reads as follows:

CITATION

BRIGADIER RAVI DATT MEHTA
IC-31794, INTELLIGENCE CORPS/EMBASSY OF INDIA, KABUL (POSTHUMOUS)
(Effective date of the award: 7 July 2008)

" Brigadier Ravi Dat Mehta, in a short span of five months in the appointment of Defence Attache, Embassy of India in Kabul, Afghanistan, contributed immensely towards enhancing historic and progressive Indo-Afghan relations.

In a declared war torn area infested with terrorism and unmindful of threats to his life, he had relentlessly worked to generate intense cooperation with Afghan Army. security agencies as well as local population very often by personal visits to dangerous far flung areas. His gallant actions in this sensitive neighbourhood helped in furthering national interests. Being responsible for the security arrangements, the officer had received inputs on possible suicide attacks by terrorists on the Indian Embassy by employing explosive laden vehicles. Against this backdrop, on his way to the Embassy as a routine, the officer used to review the security arrangements before commencing his daily duties. On 7 July 2005, it was possibly this routine drill that resulted in the crashing of the explosive laden terrorist's vehicle into his car causing the explosion at the Embassy's gate itself instead of the main building, which would have proved disastrous. Unmindful of personal safety, while following strict security check drills and acting beyond the call of his duty, he ensured that the grand design of the terrorists to blow up the complete Embassy building did not succeed. In the process while he laid down his life, he averted colossal destruction of lives and assets of the Nation. Brigadier Ravi Datt Mehta displayed gallantry, selfless service beyond the call of his duties and laid down his life in the highest traditions of the Indian Army."
