= Embassy of India, Kabul =

Diplomatic mission of the Republic of India to Afghanistan

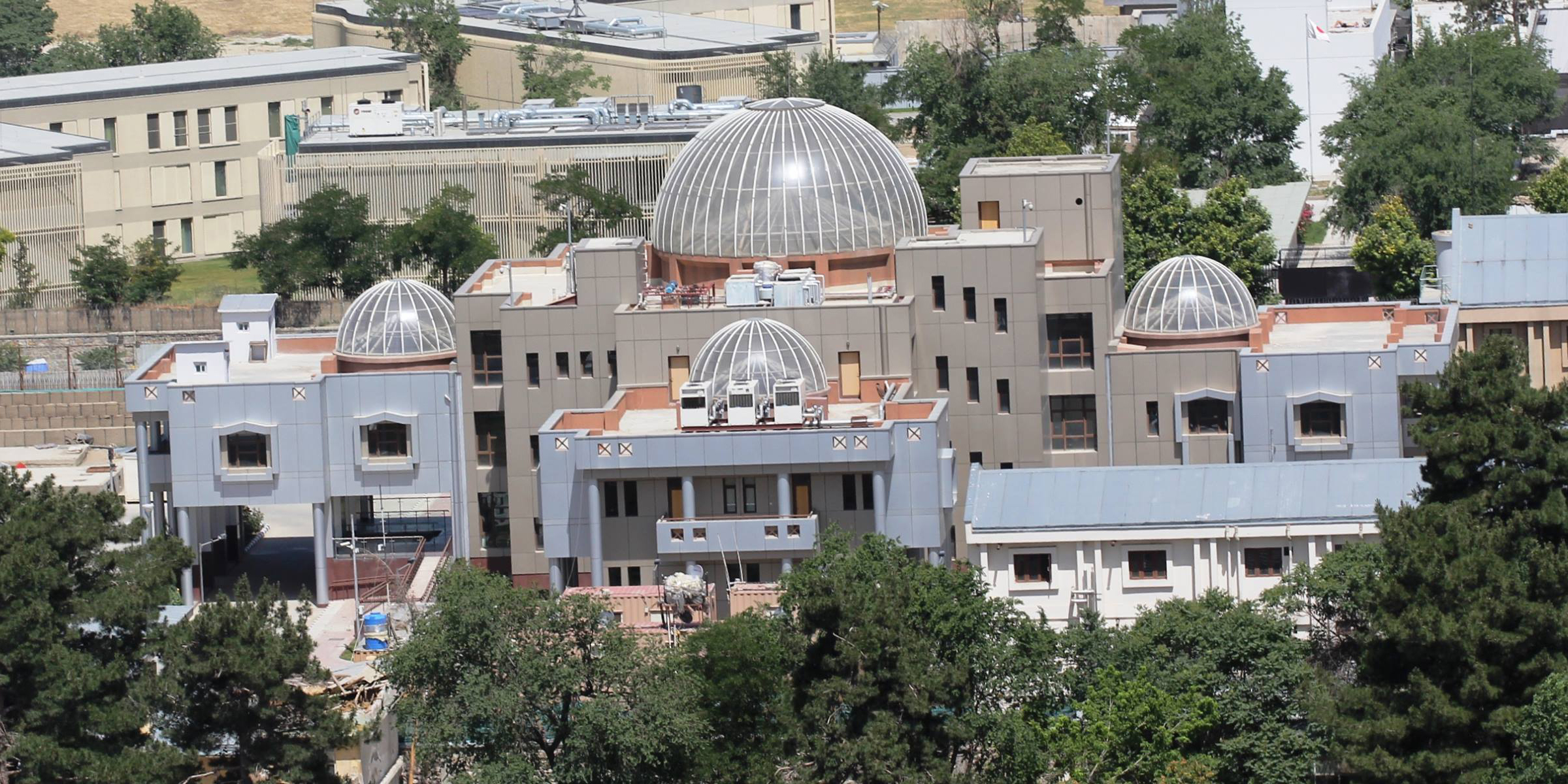
- Address: Sharara, Kabul, Afghanistan
- Coordinates: 34.5285926°N 69.1645514°E
- Ambassador: Rudrendra Tandon
- Jurisdiction: Afghanistan
- Website: Official website

The Embassy of India in Kabul is the diplomatic mission of the Republic of India to Afghanistan. The current Ambassador is Rudrendra Tandon.

The Indian embassy and consulates in Afghanistan had been targeted by militants repeatedly. After the Taliban came to power in 2021, the embassy was briefly closed and fully reopened in 2025.

== History ==
Embassy was established in January 1950 as a result of Five-year Treaty of Friendship. The treaty provided for establishment of diplomatic and consular posts in each other's territories.

The embassy as well as consulates were closed in August 2021 after 2021 Taliban offensive. Taliban ransacked Indian diplomatic missions in Afghanistan.

In June 2022, India finally re-established its diplomatic presence in Afghanistan by sending a 'Technical Team' with humanitarian assistance to Afghanistan at its embassy.

In October 2025, during the Afghan Foreign Minister Amir Khan Muttaqi visited India for the first time since the Taliban returned to power. India has announced upgrades its Kabul technical mission to embassy status.

== Indian consulates in Afghanistan ==
India had consulates in Herat, Kandahar, Jalalabad and Mazar-i-Sharif, all of which are associated with the Indian Embassy in Kabul.

== Terrorist attacks ==
=== 2008 bombing ===
The 2008 Indian embassy bombing in Kabul was a suicide bomb terror attack on the Indian embassy in Kabul, Afghanistan on 7 July 2008 at 8:30 AM local time. The bombing killed 58 people and wounded 141. The suicide car bombing took place near the gates of the embassy during morning hours when officials enter the embassy.

=== 2009 bombing ===
The 2009 Kabul Indian embassy bombing was a suicide bomb attack on the Indian embassy in Kabul, Afghanistan on 8 October 2009 at 8:30 am local time. The bombing killed 17 people and wounded 63.

=== Attacks on Consulate Generals ===
There have been carried out attacks on Indian consulates in Jalalabad (in 2013) and Herat (in 2014).

== See also ==
- Afghanistan–India relations
- Foreign relations of India
- Foreign relations of Afghanistan
- List of diplomatic missions of India
- List of diplomatic missions in Afghanistan
