= List of battles in the 21st century =

== 2000s ==
=== 2001 ===
Battle	Date	Combatant 1	Combatant 2	Outcome
Tearce attack	22 January	Macedonia	National Liberation Army (Macedonia)	NLA victory, start of the 2001 insurgency in Macedonia
Ambush near Tanuševci	4 March	Macedonia	National Liberation Army (Macedonia)	NLA victory
Battle of Tetovo	16 March – 13 August	Macedonia	National Liberation Army (Macedonia)	Ohrid Agreement
Operation MH	25–27 March	Macedonia	National Liberation Army (Macedonia)	Macedonian victory
Operation MH-1	28–29 March	Macedonia	National Liberation Army (Macedonia)	Macedonian victory
2001 Bangladesh–India border clashes	16–20 April	Bangladesh	India	Status quo ante bellum
First Vaksince offensive	3 May	Macedonia	National Liberation Army (Macedonia)	Macedonian failure
Battle of Slupčane	2 May – 11 June	Macedonia	National Liberation Army (Macedonia)	NLA victory
Operation MH-2	8 May	Macedonia	National Liberation Army (Macedonia)	Inconclusive
Battle of Oraovica	13–14 May	Serbia and Montenegro	Liberation Army of Preševo, Medveđa and Bujanovac	Serbian victory
Lisec ambush	22 May	Macedonia	National Liberation Army (Macedonia)	NLA victory
Battle of Matejče	24 May – 5 June	Macedonia	National Liberation Army	NLA victory
Operation Vaksince	25 May	Macedonia	National Liberation Army	Decisive Macedonian victory
Aračinovo crisis	12–25 June	Macedonia	National Liberation Army	Inconclusive
Battle of Raduša	20 June – 13 August	Macedonia	National Liberation Army (Macedonia)	Ohrid Agreement
Alkhan-Kala operation	22–28 June	Russia	Chechen Republic of Ichkeria	Russian victory
Battle of Vedeno	13–26 August	Russia	Chechen insurgents	Chechen victory
Battle of Kheli Hama	24 September	Patriotic Union of Kurdistan	Ansar al-Islam	Initial Ansar al-Islam victory, later PUK victory
Operation Crescent Wind	7 October – 17 December	United States; United Kingdom	Taliban	American and British victory
Operation Rhino	19–20 October	United States	Taliban	American victory
Battle of Mazar-e-Sharif	9–10 November	United States; Northern Alliance	Taliban al-Qaeda; IMU; TNSM; ETIM	American and Northern Alliance victory
Siege of Kunduz	11–25 November	United States; Northern Alliance	Taliban al-Qaeda; IMU	American and Northern Alliance victory
Battle of Herat	12 November	United States; Iran; Northern Alliance	Taliban	American, Iranian and Northern Alliance victory
Battle of Kabul	12–13 November	United States; Northern Alliance	Taliban	American and Northern Alliance victory
Battle of Tarin Kowt	13–14 November	United States; Eastern Alliance	Taliban	American and Eastern Alliance victory
Operation Trent	?–? (mid to late November)	United States; United Kingdom	Taliban al-Qaeda	American and British victory
Battle of Kandahar	22 November – 9 December	United States; Australia; Local Pashtun militia Eastern Alliance	Taliban	American victory
Battle of Qala-i-Jangi	25 November – 1 December	United States; United Kingdom; Northern Alliance	Taliban al-Qaeda; IMU; ETIM	American, British and Northern Alliance victory
Battle of Tora Bora	30 November – 17 December	United States-led coalition Northern Alliance	al-Qaeda; ETIM; Taliban	Inconclusive
Battle of Shawali Kowt	3 December	United States; Eastern Alliance	Taliban	American and Eastern Alliance victory
Battle of Sayyd Alma Kalay	4 December	United States; Eastern Alliance	Taliban	American and Eastern Alliance victory
2001–2002 India–Pakistan standoff	13 December 2001 – 10 June 2002	Pakistan	India	Status quo ante bellum, nuclear war averted
Battle of Amami-Ōshima	22 December	Japan	North Korea	Japanese victory
Tsotsin-Yurt operation	30 December 2001 – 3 January 2002	Russia	Chechen insurgents	Stalemate

=== 2002 ===
Battle	Date	Description
Operation Anaconda	1–19 March	The largest land battle between US forces and Taliban militia ends in an unsuccessful US attempt to dislodge the Taliban from their mountain strongholds
Battle of Takur Ghar	4-5 March	coalition victory
Operation Defensive Shield	29 March – 3 May	Israeli operation in the West Bank, aimed to halt Palestinian suicide bombings against civilians in Israel during the Second Intifada, which results in extensive damage to terrorist infrastructure and an important decrease of Palestinian attacks:
Battle of Bethlehem	2 April – 10 May	Israel occupies Bethlehem and tries to capture wanted Palestinian militants who are hiding in the Church of the Nativity.
Battle of Jenin	3–11 April	Israel defeats Palestinian militants in the city of Jenin.
Battle of Nablus	5–8 April	Israel defeats Palestinian militants in the city of Nablus.
2002 Grozny OMON ambush	18 April	Chechen insurgents attack Russian-backed Chechens.
Second Battle of Yeonpyeong	29 June	A naval confrontation between South Korea and North Korea
Battle of Galashki	23-25 September	Chechen rebels raid a village in Ingushetia, starting a firefight with Russian troops. They then flee back to Chechnya.
2002 Hebron ambush	15 November 2002	Palestinian Islamic Jihad ambush and kill IDF soldiers

=== 2003 ===
Battle	Date	Description
Operation Mongoose	27 January-10 February	American and ISAF forces launch a cave-clearing operation, leading to multiple battles in the Adi Ghar mountains.
2003 Lejay firefight	10 February	Taliban forces ambush American soldiers.
Battle of Al Faw	20–24 March	One of the first battles of the Iraq War
Battle of Umm Qasr	21–25 March	One of the first battles of the Iraq War
Battle of Basra	21 March-6 April	British forces manage to secure Basra after a month of some of the fiercest fighting since the outbreak of the war.
Battle of Nasiriyah	23–29 March	American armored and mechanized units force a crossing over the Euphrates River, despite stiff resistance from the Iraqis.
2003 attack on Karbala	24 March	Americans attempt to destroy the Medina division, but fail.
Operation Northern Delay	26 March	American paratroopers land in northern Iraq.
Battle of Najaf	26 March – 3 April	The American 327th Infantry Regiment defeats the Iraqis and takes Najaf, allowing them to protect vital supply lines for Coalition forces.
Battle of Karbala	27 & 28 March	The American 3rd Infantry Division defeats Iraq's elite Republican Guard, resulting in 200 Iraqi casualties.
Operation Viking Hammer	28-30 March	American and Kurdish forces defeat the Islamic Emirate of Byara.
Battle of Samawah	30 March-4 April	American forces capture Samawah.
Battle of Hillah	31 March-2 April	American forces capture Hillah, and destroy the 2nd Al Medina Armored Division in the process.
Battle of Haditha Dam	1-10 April	American forces capture Haditha Dam, a key electrical hub for Iraq.
Battle of the Karbala Gap (2003)	2-4 April	American forces capture the outskirts of Karbala leading to Baghdad.
Battle of Al Kut	3-4 April	Americans storm Al-Kut, capturing the city.
Battle of Baghdad	3–12 April	American forces capture Baghdad from Saddam Hussein's forces, causing the downfall of his government.
Wamena incident	4 April	Indonesian army raided Free Papua Movement members, causing a battle. The aftermath led to the death of 50 civilians by the Indonesian Army.
Battle of Debecka Pass	6 April	The US forces capture a major crossroad near the village of Debecka in Iraq.
Battle of Baghdad International Airport	11 April	American forces capture the airport from Muqtada al-Sadr's Mahdi army.
2003–2004 Indonesian offensive in Aceh	19 May 2003 – 13 May 2004	Indonesian forces severely defeat the Free Aceh Movement. Combined with the 2004 Indian Ocean earthquake and tsunami which devastated the region, the offensive brought the insurgency in Aceh to an end.
Battle of Majar al-Kabir	24 June	After a misunderstanding regarding patrolling through the town of Majar al-Kabir, British forces use rubber bullets in a crowd control measure, which escalates and are attacked by Iraqi civilians.
Siege of Monrovia	18 July-14 August	LURD rebels shell the city until Charles Taylor resigns.
Sétif offensive	September	Algerian forces launch an offensive against the remaining Armed Islamic Group of Algeria militants
Battle of Bhalubang	13 October	Nepalese government forces defeat Maoists.
Ramadan Offensive	26 October-24 November	Beginning of the Iraqi insurgency.
Operation All Clear	15 December 2003 – 3 January 2004	The Bhutanese army launches an offensive against Assamese separatists from India.

=== 2004 ===
Battle	Date	Description
Battle of Wana	16–23 March	Part of the Waziristan War, Pakistani army takes over Taliban positions.
Defense of the Karbala City Hall	3-6 April	Polish and Bulgarian forces defeat Mahdist insurgents attempting to capture the Karbala city hall.
First Battle of Fallujah	4 April – 1 May	Also called Operation Vigilant Resolve; US forces attempt to retake Fallujah from the control of Iraqi insurgency, resulting a ceasefire and American withdrawal.
Siege of Sadr City	4 April 2004 – 11 May 2008	American forces blockade the Shi'a district of Baghdad for four years. The end of the siege marked the end of the Iraqi Civil War.
Battle of Ramadi	6-10 April	Around the same time as the battle in Fallujah, Iraqi insurgents attempt to pin down American troops in Ramadi, but fail.
2004 Iraq KBR convoy ambush	9 April	Iraqi insurgents attack and execute American soldiers.
Battle of Husaybah	17 April	Iraqi insurgents launch a surprise offensive on American soldiers in Husaybah, but fail to capture the city.
Battle of Danny Boy	14 May	British forces defeat a Mahdist ambush at Checkpoint Danny Boy near al-Amara.
Operation Rainbow	18–23 May	Successful Israeli military operation against Hamas, Islamic Jihad and the PCR.
2004 Nazran raid	21 – 22 June	Chechen and Ingush separatists capture a lot of weapons.
First Battle of Avtury	12-13 July	Chechen militants attack a city, and then disperse after some fighting.
Battle of Najaf	5-27 August	American forces retreat from Najaf, much of the city's historic sites are damaged.
Battle of the CIMIC House	5-28 August	Mahdist forces under Muqtada al-Sadr lay siege to a British checkpoint in al-Amarah.
2004 raid on Grozny	21-22 August	Chechen militants fail to attack Russian forces.
Operation Days of Penitence	30 September – 16 October	Israeli offensive launched into the northern Gaza Strip. Israel claims victory after stating its goal of preventing Palestinian militants from firing Qassam rockets into Israeli settlements in Gaza and at the town of Sderot.
Battle of Samarra	1-3 October	American forces capture Samarra.
2004 French–Ivorian clashes	6-9 November	The Ivorian Army attacks French forces during a peacekeeping mission. In return, France nearly destroys the Ivorian Air Force and massive anti-French uprisings occur.
Second Battle of Fallujah	7 November – 23 December	Also known as Operation Phantom Fury and Operation al-Fajr; Coalition forces recapture rebel-held Fallujah in the largest post-invasion clash so far in the war.
Battle of Mosul	8-16 November	American-Kurdish forces defeat an attempt by Islamist rebels to capture Mosul.

=== 2005 ===
Battle	Date	Description
Lake Tharthar raid	23 March	American and Iraqi forces launch a raid on a Secret Army of Islam base, killing up to a third of the insurgents' forces.
Battle of Abu Ghraib	2 April	Al-Qaeda forces launch an attack on Abu Ghraib prison, capturing it until American forces retook it hours later.
Second Battle of Khara	7-8 April	Royal Nepalese forces severely defeat Maoists.
Battle of Al Qaim	8–19 May	Military offensive conducted by the United States Marine Corps, against insurgent positions in Iraq's northwestern Anbar province, ending with US tactical victory.
2005 Hit convoy ambush	9 May	Iraqi insurgents ambush American forces.
Battle of Qurna	May	Danish, Lithuanian, and British soldiers defeat Iraqi insurgents attempting to seize Al-Qurnah.
Battle of Abbas Ghar	27 June-mid July	Americans defeat Taliban near Asadabad, but the insurgents return a few weeks later.
Battle of Haditha	1-4 August	Ansar Al-Sunna insurgents surprise attack American forces, successfully defeating them. American forces in retaliation launch Operation Quick Strike, in which an al-Qaeda-planted IED killed 15 Marines.
Operation Whalers	13-18 August	American forces defeat Taliban insurgents who had retreated earlier in the summer.
Battle of Tal Afar	1-18 September	American and Iraqi forces capture Tal Afar.
Battle of Nalchik	13 October	The Yarmuk Jamaat take on Nalchik, Kabardino-Balkaria in Russia. They are defeated by Russian security forces.
Second Battle of Adre	18 December	Rally for Democracy and Liberty attack the government garrison at Adre, Chad. The garrison had been forewarned, and defeats their attackers, taking few casualties.

=== 2006 ===
Battle	Date	Description
Battle of Gimry	2-5 January	Dagestani mujahedeen rebels are pushed back.
Raid on Borota	6 January	Janjaweed defeat Chadian government
Kathmandu Valley battle	14 January	Maoists launch coordinated attacks on five military targets in the Kathmandu valley in Nepal
Raid on Amdjereme	6 March	Janjaweed break the Tripoli Agreement
Battle of Ramadi	15 March-15 November	Coalition forces defeat Al-Qaeda in Iraq
Action of 18 March 2006	18 March	American naval vessels fend off Somali pirates
April 2006 Iran–Iraq cross-border raids	3 April	Iran and PJAK clash.
Battle of N'Djamena	13 April	The Chadian rebel group United Front for Democratic Change attacks N'djamena. The rebels are forced to retreat by the Military of Chad. Chad breaks off relations with Sudan as a result.
2006 Dutch/Australian Offensive	late April – 16 July	coalition victory
Raid on Dalola	1 May	Janjaweed raid Chadian villages.
Second Battle of Mogadishu	7 May – 11 July	Militia loyal to the Islamic court union defeats the Alliance for the Restoration of Peace and Counter-Terrorism and takes control of the Somali capital Mogadishu.
Battle of Point Pedro (2006)	12 May	Sri Lanka Navy victory
Operation Mountain Thrust	15 May – 31 July	The largest offensive against the Taliban since 2001 is launched by Coalition forces.
Operation Together Forward	14 June – 24 October	The Coalition is unsuccessful in succoring Baghdad and reducing violence.
Operation Dispersive Illusion	25 June	Capture of Gilad Shalit, 2 Palestinian militants and 2 IDF soldiers killed, 4 IDF soldiers injured
Siege of Sangin	27 June-5 April	Coalition forces defeat Taliban insurgents attempting to breach Sangin
Operation Summer Rains	28 June – 26 November	Israel enters the Gaza Strip searching for soldier Gilad Shalit, who was abducted in a raid.
Operation Perth	July	Australian special forces victory
Second Battle of Avtury	4 July	Chechen soldiers ambush Russians.
First Battle of Panjwaii	8 July-19 August	Coalition forces defeat Taliban, but pull out of Panjwayi.
Zar'it-Shtula incident	12 July	A cross-border Hezbollah raid captures two Israeli soldiers. Israeli troops enters Lebanon in an unsuccessful attempt to get them back. This ignites the 2006 Israel-Lebanon conflict.
The Second Battle of Habbaniyah	15 July – December	U.S. Marines of the Third Battalion, Second Marine Division, sweep through urban sprawl between Ramadi and Fallujah in a series of operations (i.e. Operations Rubicon and Sidewinder), disrupting flow of Al-Qaeda into both cities, and killing and capturing over 300 insurgents. Action centered around Kilo Company, nicknamed "Voodoo", in the town of Husaybah, on the outskirts of Ramadi, killing 20+ insurgents and capturing/wounding 137, while losing only 4 Marines KIA, 17 WIA. The battalion lost 14 Marines KIA, 50+ WIA.
Battle of Maroun al-Ras (2006)	19–29 July	Israel captures most of the village of Maroun al-Ras but fails to fully secure it.
Battle of Bint Jbail	24 July – 11 August	Israel retreats after attempting to take the town of Bint Jbail in Lebanon, regarding it as a "Hezbollah stronghold".
Battle of Ayta ash-Shab	31 July – 11 August	Israel engages in a firefight with Hezbollah members in the Lebanese town of Ayta ash-Shab.
Operation Sharp and Smooth	1 & 2 August	An Israeli airborne operation captures five Lebanese civilians and kills what it claims to be Hezbollah members.
2006 Tyre raid	4 August	Israel successfully raids Tyre to attack Hezbollah members based there.
2006 Litani offensive	11–14 August	Israel launches the final offensive in the 2006 Israel-Lebanon conflict to clear Southern Lebanon of as many Hezbollah militants as possible before the ceasefire takes effect. The battle and war end with United Nations Security Council Resolution 1701.
Battle of Jaffna (2006)	11 August – 29 October	Stalemate
Battle of Diwaniya	28 August	Iraqi forces and Mahdist insurgents reach a ceasefire.
Battle of Sampur	28 August – 4 September	Sri Lankan Army victory over Liberation Tigers of Tamil Eelam
Operation Medusa	2–17 September	Coalition troops attack the Taliban insurgency, recapturing Panjwayi.
Operation Mountain Fury	16 September 2006 – 15 January 2007	Coalition forces launch a successful follow up to Operation Medusa in an attempt to clear eastern Afghanistan of the Taliban.
Battle of Al Rumaythah	26 September	Australian Tactical victory
Battle of Amarah	19-20 October	Iraqi forces retake the city after a ceasefire
Battle of Turki	15-16 November	A fledgling Iraqi insurgent group, ISIL, defeats American soldiers.
Battle of Malakal	27 November 2006 – 29 November 2006	Ceasefire and mutual disengagement to pre-battle positions
SLA December 2006 offensive	4–9 December	Tamil Tigers victory
Battle of Baidoa	20–26 December	ICU militia battle the Somali Transitional Federal Government. Ethiopian and TFG troops successfully defend and counterattack against the ICU taking the ICU base cities of Dinsoor and Bur Hakaba.
2006 and 2007 Tunisia clashes	23 December-3 January	Tunisian forces clash with Algerian jihadist group Salafist Group for Preaching and Combat.
Battle of Bandiradley	23–25 December	Ethiopian/Puntland offensive in Bandiradley, Somalia pushes the Islamic Courts out of the city and opens up a northern front in the Somali Civil War.
Battle of Beledweyne	24–25 December	Ethiopian offensive towards the city of Jowhar overruns the Islamic Courts stronghold of Beledweyne during the Somali Civil War.
Battle of Jowhar	27 December	Ethiopian/TFG armoured offensive hits the ICU stronghold of Jowhar, forcing the Islamists to pull back, and bringing the Ethiopians/Government troops within 90 km of Mogadishu. The battle also effectively flanked and threatened to cut off ICU forces still in the Bay region.
Fall of Mogadishu	28 December	Ethiopia captures Mogadishu.
Battle of Nawzad	2006-2014	US and allied forces are unable to capture Nawzad from Taliban forces.

=== 2007 ===
Battle	Date	Description
2006 and 2007 Tunisia clashes	3 January	Tunisian troops engage in a shootout with Islamists.
Battle of Ras Kamboni	5–12 January	The Transitional Federal Government of Somalia, in coalition with Ethiopia and the US, defeats the Islamic Courts Union.
Battle of Haifa Street	6-24 January	ISIL forces defeat Iraqi forces in Baghdad, but are then pushed out by coalition forces.
Karbala provincial headquarters raid	20 January	Asa'ib Ahl al-Haq members, posing as American soldiers, capture 4 American soldiers at an American base - the largest ambush during the war.
Battle of Najaf (2007)	28–29 January	Iraqi and Coalition forces defeat the Soldiers of Heaven cult.
Operation Imposing Law	14 February – 24 November	US troops successfully battle Iraqi insurgents to restore law and order in Baghdad.
2007 West Azerbaijan clashes	22 February-1 March	Iran and Kurdish PJAK forces clash, with parts spreading to Iraq.
Battle of Basra	27 February-3 September	Mahdist forces take over central Basra.
Battle of Same	4 March	inconclusive Australian minor victory
Battle of Baqubah	10 March-19 August	Coalition forces capture Baqubah from the Islamic State.
Battle of Mogadishu	21 March – 26 April	Ethiopian, Somalian and Ugandan forces battle the Popular Resistance Movement indecisively.
2007 Kurram Agency conflict	6-13 April	Sunni, Taliban, and Shia forces clash in Northwest Pakistan.
Battle of Route Bismarck	23-24 April	Australian victory in Iraq
Battle of Thoppigala	25 April – 11 July 2007	Sri Lankan Army victory
Alemão complex siege	2 May - 27 June	as a part of the Armed conflict for control of the favelas a large siege was formed by the Brazilian police around Alemão complex to secure the 2007 Pan American Games from gang activities, on 27 June the police invaded the complex and attacked gangs, 44 were killed including at least 11 civilians
Operation Achilles	6–30 May	Tactically successful Coalition operation in Afghanistan to clear the Helmand Province of Taliban terrorists.
Battle of Nahr el-Bared	20 May – 7 September	Armed conflict after Fatah al-Islam, an Islamist militant organization, lays siege to the refugee camp of Nahr al-Bared for Palestinians in Lebanon.
Operation Hoover	24-25 May	Coalition forces led by Canada push out Taliban militants from villages.
Operation Kamin	26 May	Taliban militants launch a series of attacks across Afghanistan, and clash with Afghan soldiers.
Operation Pickaxe-Handle	30 May-14 June	NATO forces clear out Taliban militants from Kajaki, but the Talban return shortly afterwards.
Battle of Bargal	31 May-3 June	American and Puntlander forces defeat Islamic Courts Union forces.
Battle of Gaza	7–15 June	Hamas defeats the Fatah, and takes over the Gaza Strip.
Battle of Chora	15–19 June	Coalition forces capture Chora District in Oruzgan Province from the Taliban.
Battle of Point Pedro	19 June	One of the last battles of the Sri Lankan Civil War, Sri Lankan forces defeat Tamil sailors in an area where Tamils had defeated Sri Lankans a year prior.
Battle of Donkey Island	30 June-1 July	ISIL forces defeat a small group of coalition soldiers.
Siege of Lal Masjid	3-11 July	Pakistani forces besiege a Islamist private militia at the historic Lal Masjid in Islamabad, triggering fighting in northwestern Pakistan.
Operation Hammer	24-27 July	Coalition forces led by the British regain territory south of the Helmand river.
Battle of Al Waki Market	7 August	British forces defeat a small group of Iraqi insurgents.
Battle of Firebase Anaconda	8 August	American and Afghan forces defeat Taliban insurgents launching a frontal assault.
Battle of Karbala	27-29 August	Polish and Bulgarian forces defend Karbala against insurgents.
Raids on Haskanita	30 September-early October	Unknown forces in Darfur attack an AUMIS post on 30 September, and then the town was set on fire in early October.
October 2007 clashes in Hakkâri	7-8 October, 21 October	Turkish forces capture Kurdish guerrilla leaders, but suffer heavy casualties in a Kurdish counterattack
Battle of Mirali	7-10 October	Pakistan launches an offensive against Tehrik-e-Taleban, but clashes become deadly.
Battle of Las Anod (2007)	15 October	Somalilander forces defeat Puntland, which had captured a rural Somalilander city.
Raid on Anuradhapura Air Force Base	22 October	Tamil Tigers victory
First Battle of Swat	25 October-8 December	Pakistani forces launch an offensive against Tehrik-e-Taleban militants, leading to a short-lived ceasefire.
Action of 28 October 2007	28 October	American forces defeat Somali pirates.
Dai Hong Dan incident	29 October	American forces and North Korean sailors defeat hijacking Somali pirates.
Operation Harekate Yolo	late October-7 November	Coalition forces, led by Germany and Norway, push back Taliban incursions.
Operation Commando Fury	10-14 November	Afghan forces besiege Taliban strongholds in Kapisa Province.
Battle of Musa Qala	7–12 December	ISAF and Afghan forces capture Musa Qala District in Helmand Province from the Taliban.
December 2007 Turkish incursion into northern Iraq	16-26 December	Turkey bombards PKK positions in Northern Iraq.
Battle of Delft	25 December	Disputed

=== 2008 ===
Battle	Date	Description
Battle of the Forward Defence Lines	2 January – 24 November	Victorious 2008 SLA Northern Offensive in Sri Lanka
Operation Phantom Phoenix	8 January-28 July	Coalition forces defeat Iraqi militants in Diyala and Saladin governorates, but fail to in Kirkuk and Mosul.
Operation Zalzala	24 January-20 May	Pakistani forces capture Spinkai, but fail to capture Qari Hussain.
Battle of N'Djamena	2–4 February	Forces loyal to the President of Chad defeat a rebellion.
2008 Turkish incursion into northern Iraq	11-19 February	Turkish forces launch a ground offensive into Iraq to clear out PKK rebels.
Operation Hot Winter	29 February – 3 March	Israel Defense Forces campaign in the Gaza Strip in response to Qassam rockets fired by Hamas.
2008 Mardakert skirmishes	4 March	Skirmishes between the unrecognized Republic of Artsakh and Azerbaijan, victory undecided.
Battle of Basra	25–31 March	Iraqi Army attempt to clear the city of Basra from Mahdi Army militiamen is successful and the Maliki government forces them to cease activities.
Battle of Kallarawa	25 March	Sea Tigers patrol intercepted by a Sri Lankan Navy patrol
Invasion of Anjouan	25 March	After Anjouani president Mohamed Bacar refused to step down following a disputed presidential election, African Union forces with Comoros invade the island.
2008 attack on Omdurman and Khartoum	10–12 May	The Darfuri rebel group Justice and Equality Movement attack the Sudanese cities of Omdurman and Khartoum unsuccessfully.
2008 Djiboutian-Eritrean border conflict	10–13 June	Minor skirmishes between Djibouti and Eritrea, ending in victory of Djibouti forces.
Battle of Am Zoer	18 June	Chadian forces ambush a rebel column, and successfully destroy it.
Battle of Arghandab	18–19 June	NATO led forces launch a successful offensive to clear the Taliban out of Arghandab district and from nearby Kandahar.
Operation Sirat-e-Mustaqeem	28 June-9 July	Pakistani forces destroy Taliban training bases.
Siege of Baidoa	8 July 2008 – 26 January 2009	al-Shabaab besiege and control Baidoa, the last city in southern Somalia under government control.
Battle of Wanat	13 July	Significant American casualties among the defending paratroopers leads to American withdrawal following Taliban early morning attack.
Battle of Vidattaltivu	16 July	Sri Lankan Army fought Tamil Tigers
Operation Augurs of Prosperity	29 July-11 August	A joint US-Iraqi raid on al-Qaeda and ISIL leaders is successful.
Battle of Khetagurovo	7-8 August	Georgian forces shell an Ossetian town, but retreat.
Battle of Bajaur	7 August 2008 – 28 February 2009	Pakistani forces launch a campaign to retake Bajaur District from Taliban.
Battle of Ebrahimkhel	8 August	After having battered American positions for days, Taliban and American troops engage in a large-scale firefight, with an American victory.
Battle of Tskhinvali	8–10 August	Georgians attack the South Ossetian capital city of Tskhinvali ending in withdrawal by the Georgians.
Battle of the Kodori Gorge	9–12 August	Georgian civilians flee their homes in Upper Abkhazia. Georgian military engages Abkhazian military forces unsuccessfully.
Battle of North Cotobato	9 August-late August	Filipino government forces defeat Islamist rebels, who later found Bangsamoro Islamic Freedom Fighters.
Battle off the coast of Abkhazia	10 August	Russia blockades Georgia navally.
Occupation of Poti	11 August-13 September	Russian forces invade Poti, and ransack Georgian weaponry.
Occupation of Gori	13-22 August	Russian and Ossetian forces capture Gori, forcing the Georgian government to begin negotiations.
Uzbin Valley ambush	18 August	Taliban ambush French troops in Afghanistan, causing heavy losses.
Battle of Kismayo	20-22 August	al-Shabaab takes control of Kismayo from pro-government militias.
Battle of Khaz Oruzgan	2 September	Taliban victory
Carré d'As IV incident	2-15 September	Somali pirates capture a French yacht, but are unable to retain it.
Angur Ada raid	3 September	American troops fight Taliban militants in Pakistan.
Battle of Goma	25 October	Part of the ongoing 2008 Nord-Kivu war in the Democratic Republic of the Congo.
Battle off the coast of Jaffna	1 November	Naval Battle
Battle of Kiwanja	5-6 November	Hutu rebels seize control of Kiwanja from Mai-Mai.
2008 Kufra conflict	8-20 November	Libyan government forces and Toubou rebels clash for two weeks, although a ceasefire is reached.
Action of 11 November 2008	11 November	British sailors defeat Somali pirates.
Fall of Rwindi	18-19 November	Hutu rebels capture Rwindi with little resistance, but are stopped while trying to push further on.
2008–09 Battle of Kilinochchi	23 November – 2 January	Sri Lankan Army victory
Balamorghab ambush	27 November	Taliban insurgents ambush Afghan soldiers, capturing many vehicles and weaponry.
2008–09 Garamba offensive	14 December – 15 March	The Ugandan Army withdraws, but the LRA is weakened.
Operation Cast Lead	27 December – 18 January	Israel launches an air and ground operation to stop Hamas from launching of Qassam and Grad rockets from the Gaza Strip.
Battle of Paranthan	30 December – 1 January	Tamil Tigers fought Sri Lankan Army
Operation Defeat Al Qaeda in the North	2008	US troops stationed north of Lake Tharthar raid Iraqi militants over a months-long period.

=== 2009 ===
Battle	Date	Description
Battle of Mullaitivu	2–25 January	The Sri Lankan army defeats the Tamil Tigers in a battle over the town of Mullaitivu.
Operation Shahi Tandar	7-31 January	American and Afghan troops raid Taliban bases.
Third Battle of Elephant Pass	9 January	Sri Lanka defeats LTTE.
2009 Eastern Congo offensive	20 January-27 February	A joint DRC-Rwandan offensive defeats rebels.
Battle of Chalai	2–6 February	Sri Lankan Army battles Tamil Tigers to capture one of the last Sea Tiger naval bases.
Operation Diesel	6-7 February	British and Afghan forces defeat Taliban.
Battle of South Mogadishu	24-25 February	Indecisive,
Action of 3 March 2009	3 March	German and American forces defeat Somali pirates.
Battle of Alasay	14–23 March	Codename Operation Dinner Out – French and Afghan troops defeat Taliban insurgents in the Alasay Valley.
First and Second Battles of Kakarak	16 March – 12 April	Two battles of Australian forces against Taliban insurgents, both victorious.
Battle of Aanandapuram	29 March – 5 April	Decisive victory of the Sri Lanka military against the Tamil Tigers.
Battle of Puthukkudiyirippu	2–5 April	Government victory
April 2009 raid off Somalia	9 April	French forces raid a vessel hijacked by Somali pirates.
2009 Afghanistan–Iran clash	23 April	Status quo ante bellum.
Operation Black Thunderstorm	26 April-14 June	Pakistan fully recaptures four districts from Taliban.
Attack on Bari Alai	1 May	Taliban overrun a checkpoint for the first time.
Battle of Am Dam	7 and 8 May	The Chadian Army defeats UFR rebels.
Battle of Mogadishu	7 May-1 October	Insurgents take control of Mogadishu, the Somali capital, but fail to topple the government.
Battle for Central Somalia (2009)	11 May-1 October	Jihadist rebels from Al-Shabaab defeat the Somali alliance and capture parts of central Somalia.
Second Battle of Swat	16 May – 15 July	The Pakistani Army retakes the town of Mingora from the Taliban, killing many leaders.
Battle of Wabho	7 June	Ahlu Sunna Waljama'a defeats Al-Shabaab.
Sobat River ambush	12 June	Jikany Nuer groups ambush a SPLA convoy escorting UN food.
Operation Panther's Claw	19 June-20 August	British forces consolidate coalition positions.
Operation Rah-e-Nijat	19 June-12 December	Pakistan fully retakes South Waziristan District.
Operation Strike of the Sword	2 July-20 August	US Marines launch an offensive in Helmand Province.
Operation Scorched Earth	11 August 2009 – 12 February 2010	Yemen launched a military offensive against Houthis, but it ends in a stalemate.
Battle of Dahaneh	12–15 August	US, UK and Afghan troops capture the city from Taliban insurgents.
Battle of Rafah	14-15 August	Hamas defeats Jund Ansar Allah.
2009 Khyber Pass offensive	1 September-30 November	Pakistan defeats Taliban from roads throughout Khyber Pakhtunkhwa.
Battle of Sabzak	3-4 September	Spanish troops defeat Taliban
Action of 7 September 2009	7 September	German sailors defeat Somali pirates.
2009 Baraawe raid	14 September	US forces kill Saleh Ali Saleh Nabhan.
Battle of Kismayo	1-7 October	al-Shabaab takes full control of Kismayo.
Battle of Kamdesh	3 October	Taliban insurgents attack a US Combat Outpost. They are repulsed, but the outpost is abandoned due to damage.
Dongo conflict	30 October-13 December	Clashes break out between rebels and government forces in Dongo, Democratic Republic of the Congo.
Battle of Daecheong	10 November	Clash between South and North Korean naval troops at the Northern Limit Line, ending in a victory for the South.
Operation Cobra's Anger	4–7 December	Successful US-led offensive in Helmand province in southern Afghanistan.

== 2010s ==
=== 2010 ===
Battle	Date	Description
Eritrean–Ethiopian border skirmish	1 January	Eritrean forces clash with Ethiopian troops in the Ethiopian town of Zalambessa.
First Battle of Beledweyne	10-14 January	Ahlu Sunna Waljama'a captures the town from Hizbul Islam.
Operation Blow to the Head	13 January-12 February	Pro-government Yemeni troops attempt to capture Saada from a Houthi-AQAP alliance, but fail, destroying much of Saada in the process.
Second Battle of Beledweyne	22-24 January	Following a counterattack, Hizbul Islam recaptures the town.
Operation Moshtarak	13 February – 7 December	ISAF pacification offensive in the area that is described as the "poppy-growing belt" of Helmand Province in southern Afghanistan. NATO troops attack Marjah, but are forced to withdraw by Taliban
2010 Nagorno-Karabakh clashes	18 February	Armenia and Azerbaijan clash in Nagorno-Karabakh.
Dammarie-Les-Lys shooting	17 March	Basque separatist group ETA members shoots and kills a French police officer in a shootout near Dammarie-Les-Lys, southeast of Paris.
Orakzai and Kurram offensive	23 March-3 June	Pakistani forces launch an offensive in Orakzai District and Kurram District, clearing the areas of Taliban by early June. Low-level clashes continue until 21 January 2011.
Action of 30 March 2010	30 March	Seychellois coast guard defeat Somali pirates.
South Darfur clash	23 April	SPLA troops clash with either Sudanese troops or Rizeigat insurgents.
Battle of Tamassi	24-28 April	Chadian forces defeat allied rebels
Ayn clashes	22 May-19 July	Ethiopian and Somalilander troops clash.
Shah Wali Kot Offensive	10-14 June	Coalition victory
June 2010 Mardakert clashes	18-19 June	Armenian and Azeri troops clash in Nagorno-Karabakh, with no significant changes.
Saric shootout	1 July	Beltrán-Leyva Cartel victory on Sinaloa Cartel
Kenya–Al-Shabaab border clash	20 July	al-Shabaab attack a Kenyan border outpost.
Battle of Sangin	July 2010-October 2011	NATO captures Sangin from Taliban.
First Battle of Lawdar	19-25 August	Yemeni troops recapture Lawdar.
Battle of Mogadishu	23 August 2010 – 6 August 2011	The eighth recognised battle over Mogadishu since 1993. Pro-government militias and allies fully hold the capital.
Battle of Derapet	24 August	A combined Australian Army and Afghan National Army patrol defeats Taliban forces.
September 2010 Mardakert clashes	1 September	Azeris and Armenians clash a second time, although it fizzles out quickly.
Operation Dragon Strike	15 September-31 December	NATO forces defeat Taliban insurgents and capture one Quds serviceman.
Hsipaw ambush	1 October	KNLA ambush Burmese junta troops near the Thai border leading up to escalated clashes.
Operation Halmazag	31 October-4 November	Coalition forces, led by Germany, push out Taliban from Kunduz Province.
Battle of Myawaddy	8-9 November	Burmese troops capture Myawaddy, a KNLA stronghold near the Thai border, in the first major clash in 2010.
Karen State clashes	10-27 November	Low-level clashes in Kayin State following the battle at Myawaddy.
Operation Bulldog Bite	12-25 November	Joint U.S. and Afghan counter-insurgent mission in Kunar province, Afghanistan, against Taliban forces.
2010 Rio de Janeiro security crisis	21-28 November	Occupation of Vila Cruzeiro and Complexo do Alemão by Brazilian government forces
Bombardment of Yeonpyeong	23 November	North Korean artillery hits military and civilian targets during a South Korean training exercise.

=== 2011 ===
Battle	Date	Description
Operation Dawn of Gulf of Aden	16–21 January	The South Korean Navy rescues the crew of the hijacked Samho Jewelry, killing eight Somali pirates.
Battle off Minicoy Island	28 January	Indian troops defeat Somali pirates.
camel battle	2 February	baltagiya supporting Hosni Mubarak rode camels and horses into Tahrir Square wielding swords in a medieval style cavalry charge in an attempt to end the protests, a number of protesters were killed but the horsemen were pushed back failing to end the 2011 Egyptian revolution.
Battle of Bayda	16–18 February	Protestors seize control of the city after clashes with security forces – first battle of the Libyan Civil War.
First Battle of Benghazi	17–20 February	Libyan rebel forces free the city from Col. Gaddafi's rule.
2011 Bahraini uprising	14 February – 18 March	Uprising of mostly shia protesters allegedly supported by Iran quelled down by Bahrain supported by Saudi Arabian and Gulf council forces.
Battle of Misrata	18 February – 15 May	After Months of intense fighting, the rebels take full control of Misrata, supported by NATO aircraft.
First Battle of Zawiya	24 February – 10 March	Zawiya is retaken by Libyan elite soldiers, one of the rebels' commanders is killed.
First Battle of Brega	2 March	Pro-Gaddafi troops fail to retake Brega from rebel forces.
Battle of Ras Lanuf	4–12 March	After initial success by the rebel forces, Ras Lanuf is retaken by government troops.
Battle of Bin Jawad	6 March	Gaddafi forces retake Bin Jawad – the initial Rebel offensive westwards is halted.
Second Battle of Brega	13–15 March	Brega is retaken by Gaddafi forces after the defeats at Ras Lanuf and Bin Jawad.
Battle of Ajdabiya	15–26 March	Initial success by government troops is halted and they are pushed back by rebels, under fire from NATO aircraft.
Second Battle of Benghazi	19–20 March	Loyalist forces fail to recapture Benghazi from the now UN-backed rebels.
Battle of Saada	19-26 March	Houthis take control of Saada.
India–Pakistan border skirmish	30 March-1 April	Both sides claim the other was the instigator.
Third Battle of Brega	31 March – 7 April	A rebel advance on Brega is repelled with heavy artillery, Pro-Gaddafi forces march on Ajdabiya.
Battle of Abidjan	31 March - 11 April	Pro-Ouattara forces capture the largest Ivorian city of Abidjan and prompt the arrest of President Laurent Gbagbo.
Battle of Jubbada Hoose	1 April-16 October	Somali troops and al-Shabaab clash near the Kenyan border,
Battle of Brega-Ajdabiya road	8 April – 13 July	Advances on Brega and Ajdabiya by the opposing forces lead to a stagnant frontline in-between the two cities.
Battle of Wazzin	21 April-29 July	Anti-Gaddafi rebels initially capture Wazzin, although pro-Gaddafi forces capture the border post by Tunisia a week later. Backed by Tunisian troops, rebels recapture the border post with fighting continuing until July.
Siege of Daraa	25 April - 5 May	Syrian forces suppress anti-Assad protests in Syria.
Battle of Gedo	27 April - late 2012	After fierce Somali and allied bombardment, al-Shabaab leave Gedo region.
Siege of Homs	6 May 2011 – 9 May 2014	Syrian rebels, spurred by anti-regime protests, battle for Homs.
Battle of Kandahar	7–9 May	Kandahar is besieged by Taliban insurgents, Afghan Police Forces are able to fend them off.
Siege of Baniyas	7-14 May	Syrian forces suppress anti-regime protests in Baniyas.
Siege of Talkalakh	14-19 May	Syrian forces violently suppress anti-regime protests.
Battle of the Misrata frontline	16 May-23 August	Rebels capture various cities, but pro-Gaddafi troops make gains south of Sirte.
Battle of Sana'a	23 May – 7 June	Hashid tribal forces under Sheikh Sadiq al-Ahmar fight Army troops loyal to president Saleh, resulting in a cease-fire.
Battle of Do Ab	25 May	US and Afghan government troops are ambushed by Taliban insurgents and kill most of the attackers.
Battle of Ruíz	25 May	Sinaloa Cartel attack a convoy of Los Zetas starting a violent battle in which there were used two Narco tanks.
Battle of Zinjibar	27 May-10 September	AQAP captures the rural Yemeni town of Zinjibar.
Siege of Rastan and Talbiseh	28 May – 4 June	First major violent outbreak in the Syrian civil war.
Battle of Taiz	28 May-7 June	Alliance of Yemeni Tribes hold the city from the Yemeni army.
Jisr ash-Shughur clashes	4-12 June	The Syrian civil war escalates into armed clashes.
Sabha clashes	8-13 June	Pro-Gaddafi forces hold Sabha.
Zawiya skirmish	11-12 June	Pro-Gaddafi forces hold Zawiya.
Jabal al-Zawiya operation	28 June-7 July	Unorganized but armed protestors clash with Syrian troops.
Siege of Hama	3 July-4 August	Syrian forces suppress protestors.
Operation Koh-e-Sufaid	4 July-18 August	Pakistani forces defeat Taliban.
Iran–Iraq cross-border raids	11 July-29 September	Iranian special forces launch attacks on PJAK bases in Iraq.
Fourth Battle of Brega	14 July – 22 August	After initial victories of pro-Gaddafi forces, rebels take Brega in late August.
Battle of Zliten	21 July-19 August	Following a failed uprising in Zliten, anti-Gaddafi rebels and pro-Gaddafi forces clash, with a final anti-Gaddafi victory.
Msallata clashes	3-9 August	Anti-Gaddafi rebels take control of Msallata, independently from other Libyan rebels.
Battle of Tawergha	11-13 August	Anti-Gaddafi rebels capture Tawergha.
Raid on Ras Lanuf	12 August	Anti-Gaddafi forces successfully drive off pro-Gaddafi assaults, but facilities are heavily damaged.
Battle of Gharyan	13-18 August	Anti-Gaddafi rebels capture Gharyan.
Siege of Latakia	13-19 August	Syrian troops suppress protests in Latakia.
Second Battle of Zawiya	13–20 August	Rebel forces capture Zawiya and advance on Tripoli.
Ras Ajdir clashes	13-26 August	After multiple failed assaults, rebels capture Ras Ajdir.
Operation Eagle	14 August 2011—September 2012	Egyptian military victory
Battle of Tripoli (2011)	20–28 August	Tripoli is captured by rebel forces, Gaddafi government collapses.
Second Battle of Bin Jawad	23-27 August	NTC rebels capture the town of Bin Jawad from pro-Gaddafi forces.
Operación Escorpión	28 August – 31 October	Mexican army Victory, Los Zetas and the Gulf Cartel were weaken.
Hama Governorate clashes	1 September 2011 – 14 April 2012	Syrian troops largely capture the city of Hama, but rebels control the countryside of the region.
Battle of Bani Walid	8 September – 17 October	Initially, pro-Gaddafi forces fend off anti-Gaddafi forces but on 9 October anti-Gaddafi forces launch a new offensive against the defenders, taking Bani Walid by 17 October.
Idlib Governorate clashes	8 September 2011 – 27 March 2012	anti-Assad protestors, now a somewhat organized force, take control of most of Idlib Governorate.
Battle of Doan	9 September	Australian/coalition victory
Battle of Elwaq	9-10 September	Somali forces liberate Elwaq from jihadists.
Attack on the Israeli Embassy in Egypt	9 September	protesters broke into the Israeli embassy in Cairo after breaking down a wall with battering rams. the embassy staff went into a safe room and were evacuated by Egyptian commandos following the intervention of Barack Obama.
Battle of Sirte (2011)	15 September – 20 October	National Liberation Army soldiers attack Sirte, the last capital of the Great Socialist People's Libyan Arab Jamahiriya and take it on 20 October. Colonel Muammar Gaddafi also dies this day.
Raid on Ghadames	24-26 September	NTC repels pro-Gaddafi fighters, but some hit-and-run attacks succeeded,
Battle of Rastan (2011)	27 September – 1 October	Syrian army retakes the city.
Siege of Dammaj	15 October-22 December	Houthis attempt to capture Dammaj, ending in a bloody ceasefire.
Operation Linda Nchi	16 October 2011 – 31 May 2012	Kenyan troops intervene in the Somali civil war, capturing various border areas.
Battle of Deynile	20 October	al-Shabaab fighters ambush Burundian troops in a Mogadishu suburb.
Rif Dimashq clashes	3 November 2011 – 1 April 2012	Protests are largely suppressed by the Syrian government,
Daraa Governorate clashes	14 November 2011 – 3 January 2013	An FSA offensive captures multiple cities in the governorate.
Shayrat and Tiyas airbase ambush	25 November	Syrian rebels successfully ambush the airbase.
Deir ez-Zor clashes	26 November 2011 – 10 April 2014	Rebels hold off a Syrian government offensive on the city.
Syrian–Turkish border clash	5-12 December	Syrian troops repulse armed men from the Turkish border.
December 2011 Baneh clash	28 December	Iran and PJAK clash, albeit inconclusively.
Battle of Beledweyne	December 2011-31 December 2012	Ethiopian and Somali forces capture Beledweyne.

=== 2012 ===
Battle	Date	Outcome
First Battle of Zabadani	7 – 18 January	Ceasefire
Attack on Spanish oiler Patiño	12 January	Spanish victory
First Battle of Menaka	17 January	Both parties claim victory
Battle of Aguelhok	17–25 January	MNLA victory
Battle of Tessalit	18 January – 11 March	rebels victory
Battle of In Emsal	20 January	MNLA-Jihadist victory
Battle of Douma	21–30 January	Syrian government's victory
Bani Walid uprising	23–25 January	Rebel victory
Fall of Andéramboukane	26 January	MNLA victory
First Battle of Rastan	29 January – 5 February	FSA victory
Homs offensive	3 February-14 April	Syrian Army recaptures 70% of the city.
Second Battle of Zabadani	4-11 February	FSA victory
Battle of Tinzaouaten	7–8 February	MNLA victory
Battle of al-Qusayr	10 February – 20 April	Stalemate
Aleppo Governorate clashes	10 February-19 July	FSA victory
Battle of Taftanaz	11 February-5 April	Syrian victory
Kufra conflict	12 February-1 July	Ceasefire
Nozhay-Yurtovsky District clashes	13–17 February	Unclear
Battle of Goumakoura	24 February	Malian government victory
Sudan Air Campaign	1 March – ? September	Incumbent
Battle of Dofas	4–5 March	Ansar al-Sharia victory
Battle of Azaz	6 March – 23 July	FSA victory
Battle of Yurkud	10 March	Ethiopian Victory
Battle of Idlib	10–13 March	Syrian government's victory
Battle of Saraqeb	24–27 March	Syrian government's victory
First Battle of Heglig	26–28 March	South Sudanese victory
Battle of Kidal	26-30 March	MNLA victory
April Idlib Governorate Operation	31 March-14 April	Syria recaptures three cities
Battle of Taftanaz	3–5 April	Syrian government's victory
Scarborough Shoal standoff	8 April 2012 – present	De-escalation of tensions between claimant nations
Second Battle of Heglig	10–20 April	Sudan victory
Agok Skirmish	17 April	Indecisive
Armenian–Azerbaijani border clashes	25 April – 4 June	Status quo ante bellum
Abyan offensive	12 May – 15 June	Decisive Yemeni government's victory
Second Battle of Rastan	14 May	FSA victory
Siege of Northern Homs	14 May 2012 – 29 April 2018	Syrian governments recapture Homs
2012–2017 Lebanon–Syria border clashes	1 June 2012 – 28 August 2017	Lebanese and Syrian governments fully recapture the Lebanon–Syria border
Idlib Governorate clashes	3 June 2012 – 18 April 2013	Partial FSA victory and stalemate
Tripoli airport clashes	4 June	Libyan Government's victory
Battle of al-Haffah	5–13 June	Syrian government's victory
Zintan clashes	11–18 June	NTC control reestablished
Hakkari clashes	19 June 2012 – 11 August	Turkish claim victory
Battle of Gao	26–28 June	Decisive Islamist victory; end of state of Azawad
Battle of Tremseh	12 July	FSA victory
Battle of Damascus	15 July-4 August	Syrian government's victory
Battle of Aleppo	19 July 2012 – 22 December 2016	Decisive Syrian government's & allied victory
Siege of Nubl and al-Zahraa	19 July 2012 – 3 February 2016	Syrian government forces break the siege.
Al-Hasakah Governorate campaign	20 July 2012 – 31 December 2013	YPG makes gains in the cities, ISIS makes gains in the countryside.
2012 Gorno-Badakhshan clashes	24–25 July	Tajikistan government victory
Battle of Anadan	29–30 July	FSA victory
August 2012 Sinai attack	5 August	Militants ambushed an Egyptian military base during Iftar in Ramadan and attacked Kerem shalom
Jordanian–Syrian border incidents during the Syrian civil war	10 August 2012 – 31 July 2018	Jordanian government victory, Syrian government loses a majority of the borders.
Rif Dimashq offensive (August–October 2012)	15 August-7 October	SAA pushes rebels out of some areas, but not all.
Lopota incident	28 August – 30 October	Georgian government's victory
September 2012 Beytüşşebap attack	2 September	Turkish victory
Siege of Bani Walid	9 September – 26 October	Libyan Government's victory
2012 Benghazi attack	11-12 September	US Ambassador Christopher Stevens killed along with a USFS officer and 2 CIA contractors.
Raqqa campaign	19 September 2012 – 6 March 2013	Rebels capture Raqqa and surrounding sites.
Siege of Base 46	22 September-19 November	FSA captures Base 46 in the Syrian desert
Battle of Kismayo	28 September – 1 October	Somalian government's & allied victory
Battle of Khirbet Al-Joz	6 October	FSA victory
Siege of Wadi Deif	11 October 2012 – 18 April 2013	Syrian Army forces break the siege.
Battle of Maarat al-Numan	8–13 October	rebels victory
Battle of Harem	17 October – 24 December	Rebel victory
Quneitra Governorate clashes	2 November 2012 – 27 August 2014	Rebel victory; SAA largely leave the governorate by 2014.
Rif Dimashq offensive (November 2012–February 2013)	7 November 2012 – 5 February 2013	FSA takes control of Darayya, Zamalka, Harasta, and Arbin, but the offensive stalls. SAA then attacks Darayya.
First Battle of Ras al-Ayn	8 November – 17 December 2012 (first phase)	YPG victory
Siege of Darayya and Muadamiyat	9 November 2012 – 19 October 2016	SAA forces capture Darayya in August 2016, rebels leave Muadamiyat after 4 years of ceasefire in October.
Operation Pillar of Defense	14–21 November 2012	Ceasefire, both sides claim victory
Battle of Darayya	15 November 2012 – 14 February 2013	Syrian army and Hezbulla victory
Ambush of Tagarangabotte	16 November	MNLA victory
Battle of In-Delimane	16 November	Islamist victory
Battle of Menaka	16–20 November	Islamists Victory
MT Zafirah hijacking	18–22 November	Vietnamese victory
Battle of Yarmouk Camp	5-17 December	FSA and the Palestinian Liwa al-Asifa militia take control of the camp.
2012 Hama offensive	16-31 December	FSA attempts to capture Hama Governorate, but fail.

=== 2013 ===
Battle	Date	Description
Battle of Konna	10–18 January	Malian army retakes the town Konna with French air-strikes after losing the town by Islamists groups.
Battle of Diabaly	14–21 January	Malian and French troops retake Diabaly by the Islamists groups.
Second Battle of Ras al-Ayn	17 January-19 February	Clashes break out again after a ceasefire, but end with another ceasefire.
Second Battle of Gao	25–27 January	French forces attacked and successfully took Gao out of MOJWAs hands after they launched an offensive on Gao.
Battle of Safira	6–19 February	Al-Nusra Front's rebels attacked and captured the town of As-Safira from the government.
Third Battle of Gao	9–11 February	Jihadists were defeated by Malian government forces with the support of troops from France.
Battle of Shadadeh	12–14 February	Al-Nusra Front victory, capturing the city from the Syrian government forces.
Fourth Battle of Gao	20–22 February	The Islamist group MOJWA tried to retake the city. The attempt was repelled by Malian government forces with the support of troops from France and Niger.
Battle of Khalil	22–23 February	French-Azawad victory
Battle of Ifoghas	22 February	French-Chadian victory
Battle of Iminenas	27 February – 1 March	French-Malian victory
Battle of Raqqa	3–6 March	Rebels seize Raqqa from government forces
Battle of Tin Keraten	6 March	French-Malian victory
Battle of Tigharghar	12 March	Chadian victory
Battle of Djebok	12–17 March	French-Malian victory
Battle of Timbuktu	20–21 March	French-Malian victory
Second Battle of Timbuktu	20 March – 1 April	French-Malian victory
Fifth Battle of Gao	24 March	French-Malian victory
Battle of In Arab	29–30 March	ALF Victory
Sanamayn clashes	10 April 2013-December 2016	Clashes break out between defecting SAA officers and the Syrian government.
Battle of Jdaidet al-Fadl	16–21 April	Syrian government forces regain control of Jdaidet al-Fadl
Battle of Hamakouladji	4 May 2013	
Battle of al-Qusayr (2013)	19 May – 5 June 2013	Syrian Army and Hezbollah victory
Battle of Agadez and Arlit	23 May 2013	attack on a Niger Army base in Agadez and a French operated uranium mine in Arlit.
Battle of Sidon (2013)	23–25 June 2013	Lebanese Army and Hezbollah victory
Third Battle of Ras al-Ayn	17-20 July	YPG cement control over the city.
Rabba dispersal	14 Aug	Hundreds of pro-Muslim Brotherhood protesters killed, 43 police officers killed, protest near Rabaa al-Adawiya Mosque ended.
Kerdasa's police station attack	14 Aug	militants stormed the police station of Kerdasa killing 12 officers and 2 civilians.
Battle of Ma'loula	4–15 September 2013	Syrian army victory
Battle of Sadad	21–28 October 2013	Syrian army victory
Battle of Qalamoun	15 November – 15 December 2013	Syrian army and Hezbollah victory
Battle of Araouane	10 December 2013	French victory

=== 2014 ===
Battle	Date	Description
Battle of Kondaoui	22–23 January 2014 (1 day)	
Battle of Mork	1 February – 23 October 2014 (8 months, 3 weeks and 1 day)	
Battle of Asadabad	23 February 2014 (0 days)	
Battle of Hosn	20 March 2014 (0 days)	
Battle of Markada	21–31 March 2014 (1 week and 3 days)	
Battle of Al-Malihah	3 April – 14 August 2014 (4 months, 1 week and 4 days)	
2014 Battle of Basilan	11–30 April 2014 (2 weeks and 5 days)	
Battle of Kramatorsk	12 April – 5 July 2014 (2 months, 3 weeks and 2 days)	
Long March (South Sudan)	25 April – 4 August 2014 (3 months, 1 week and 3 days)	
Battle of Mariupol (May–June 2014)	6 May – 14 June 2014 (1 month, 1 week and 1 day)	
Chibok ambush	13–14 May 2014 (1 day)	
2nd Battle of Kidal	16–21 May 2014 (5 days)	
First Battle of Donetsk Airport	26–27 May 2014 (1 month and 1 day)	
Zarb-e-Azb	15 June 2014 – 22 February 2016	
First Battle of Tikrit	26–30 June 2014 (4 days)	
Battle of Tripoli Airport	13 July – 23 August 2014 (1 month, 1 week and 3 days)	
First Battle of the Shaer gas field	16–26 July 2014 (1 week and 3 days)	
Battle in Shakhtarsk Raion	16 July – 26 August 2014 (1 month, 1 week and 3 days)	
2014 Farafra ambush	19 July 2014 (0 days)	
Battle of Shuja'iyya	19–23 July 2014 (3 days)	
Battle of Horlivka	21 July – 6 September 2014 (1 month, 2 weeks and 2 days)	
Battle of Zumar	1–4 August 2014 (3 days)	
Battle of Arsal	2–7 August 2014 (5 days)	
Battle of Ilovaisk	7 August – 2 September 2014 (3 weeks and 5 days)	
Battle of Al-Tabqa airbase	10–28 August 2014 (2 weeks and 4 days)	
Battle for Mosul Dam	16–19 August 2014 (3 days)	
Battle of Novoazovsk	25–28 August 2014 (3 days)	
Battle of Suq al Ghazi	15 September 2014 (0 days)	
Second Battle of Sanaa	16-21 September 2014 (5 days)	
Second Battle of Donetsk Airport	28 September 2014 – 21 January 2015 (3 months, 3 weeks and 3 days)	
Battle of Benghazi (2014–17)	15 October 2014 – 28 December 2017 (3 years, 2 months, 1 week and 6 days)	
Battle of Kurm Al Qawades	24 October 2014	
Second Battle of the Shaer gas field	28 October – 6 November 2014 (1 week and 2 days)	
Battle of Baiji (October–December 2014)	29 October–21 December 2014 (1 month, 3 weeks and 1 day)	
Battle of Al-Shaykh Maskin	1 November 2014 – 15 December 2014 (1 month and 2 weeks)	
Battle of Ramadi (2014–15)	21 November 2014 – 17 May 2015 (5 months, 3 weeks and 5 days)	
Battle of Baiji (2014–15)	25 November 2014 – 9 February 2015 (2 months, 2 weeks and 1 day)	
Lindt Cafe siege	15-16 December 2014 (1 day)	

=== 2015 ===
Battle	Date	Description	Conflict
Raid on Kolofata	12 January 2015 (0 days)		Boko Haram insurgency
Battle of Debaltseve	14 January – 20 February 2015 (1 month and 6 days)		War in Donbas
West African offensive	23 January – 24 December 2015 (11 months and 1 day)		Boko Haram insurgency
Mariupol rocket attack	24 January 2015 (0 days)		War in Donbas
Mamasapano clash	25 January 2015 (1 day)		Moro conflict
January 2015 Sinai attacks	29 January 2015		Sinai insurgency
Niger raid	6 February 2015 (0 days)		Boko Haram insurgency
Kokang offensive	9 February – June 2015 (3 months, 3 weeks and 2 days)		Kokang conflict
Shyrokyne standoff	10 February – 3 July 2015 (4 months, 3 weeks and 2 days)		War in Donbas
Operation Shah Euphrates	22 February (11 years, 8 months, 1 week and 5 days)		Turkey–Islamic State conflict
Battle of Tikrit	2 March – 17 April 2015 (1 month, 2 weeks and 1 day)		Iraqi Civil War
Battle of Sirte	14 March – 31 May 2015 (2 months, 2 weeks and 3 days)		Libyan Civil War
Battle of Aden Airport	19 March 2015 (0 days)		Yemeni Civil War
2015 Ocotlán ambush	19 March 2015 (0 days)		Mexican drug war
2015 San Sebastián del Oeste ambush	6 April 2015 (0 days)		Mexican drug war
Battle of Dhale	24 March – 26 May 2015 (2 months and 2 days)		Yemeni Civil War
Battle of Aden	25 March – 22 July 2015 (3 months, 3 weeks and 6 days)		Yemeni Civil War
Abyan campaign	26 March – 11 August 2015 (4 months, 2 weeks and 2 days)		Yemeni Civil War
Lahij insurgency	27 March – 4 August 2015 (4 months, 1 week and 1 day)		Yemeni Civil War
Siege of al-Fu'ah and Kafriya	28 March 2015 – 19 July 2018 (3 years, 3 months and 3 weeks)		Syrian civil war
Shabwah campaign	29 March – 15 August 2015 (4 months, 2 weeks and 3 days)		Yemeni Civil War
Battle of Mukalla	2–16 April 2015 (2 weeks)		Yemeni Civil War
Al-Karmah offensive	14 April – 3 May 2015 (2 weeks and 5 days)		Iraqi Civil War
Battle of Taiz	15 April 2015 – present (11 years, 6 months, 2 weeks and 4 days)		Yemeni Civil War
Battle of Kunduz	24 April – 14 October 2015 (5 months, 2 weeks and 6 days)		War in Afghanistan
1 May 2015 Jalisco attacks	1 May 2015 – 1 May 2015 (0 days)		Mexican drug war
Kumanovo clashes	9–10 May 2015 (5 months and 1 day)		Inter-ethnic clashes in the Republic of Macedonia
2015 Tanhuato–Ecuandureo shootout	22 May 2015 (0 days)		Mexican drug war
Battle of Marinka	3 June 2015 (0 days)		War in Donbas
MT Orkim Harmony hijacking	11–19 June 2015 (1 week and 1 day)		Piracy in the Strait of Malacca
Battle of Leego	26 June 2015 (0 days)		War in Somalia War
Hakkari Assault	? July 2015 – ? November 2015 (4 months)		Kurdish–Turkish conflict
Sinai clashes	1–2 July 2015 (1 day)		Sinai insurgency
Operation Martyr Yalçın	24–25 July 2015 (1 day)		Kurdish–Turkish conflict Turkey–ISIL conflict DHKP/C insurgency in Turkey
Police raids in Turkey	24 July 2015 (0 days)		Kurdish–Turkish conflict Turkey–ISIL conflict DHKP/C insurgency in Turkey
Şırnak clashes	? August 2015 – ? May 2016 (9 months)		Kurdish–Turkish conflict
Cizre operation	4–11 September 2015 (9 months and 1 week)		Kurdish–Turkish conflict
Operation Martyr's Right	7 September 2015 – 25 January 2023 (7 years, 4 months, 2 weeks and 4 days)		Sinai insurgency
Jerusalem Intifada	9 September 2015– 30 June 2016 (9 months and 3 weeks)		Israeli–Palestinian conflict
Camp Badaber attack	18 September 2015 (0 days)		War in North-West Pakistan
Aden unrest	6 October 2015 – 29 August 2019 (3 years and 10 months)		Yemeni Civil War
Sinjar offensive	12 – 15 November 2015 (3 days)		Iraqi Civil War
Arish hotel bombing	24 November 2015		Sinai insurgency
Cizre curfew	? December 2015 – 11 February 2016 (2 months, 1 week and 3 days)		Kurdish–Turkish conflict
Fall of Zinjibar and Jaar	2–3 December 2015 (1 day)		Yemeni Civil War
Siege of Sur	3 December 2015 – 10 March 2016 (3 months and 1 week)		Kurdish–Turkish conflict
Battle of Port Midi	First phase 19 December 2015 – 23 January 2016 (1 month and 4 days); Second phase 30 January 2016 – present (10 years, 9 months and 3 days)		Yemeni Civil War

=== 2016 ===
Battle	Date	Description	Conflict
Operation Black Swan	8 January 2016 (0 days)	Mexican-American victory, the Sinaloa Cartel leader Joaquín Guzmán was recaptured.	Mexican drug war
Battle of El Adde	15 January 2016 (0 days)	El Adde was captured by Al Shabaab after a military massacre.	War in Somalia War
Siege of Fallujah	2 February – 22 May 2016 (3 months, 2 weeks and 6 days)	The city Fallujah was fully besieged by Iraqi government forces and recaptured the town Al-Karmah.	Iraqi Civil War
Nangarhar Offensive	14 February – 6 March 2016 (3 weeks)	The Afghan National Army recaptured 22 villages from ISIL.	War in Afghanistan
1st Butig clash	20 February – 1 March 2016 (1 week and 3 days)	The Maute Group retreated after the attempted attack.	Moro conflict
Battle of Ben Guerdane	7–9 March 2016 (2 days)	The Tunisian forces defended Ben Gardane.	ISIL insurgency in Tunisia
Battle of Hit	12 March – 14 April 2016 (1 month and 2 days)	The Iraqi Army recaptured Hit.	Iraqi Civil War
Mosul offensive	24 March – 22 September 2016 (5 months, 4 weeks and 1 day)	Pro-Iraqi government forces capture Qayyarah Airfield West, Qayyarah, and Al-Shirqat.	Iraqi Civil War
Armenian–Azerbaijani clashes	1–5 April 2016 (4 days)	Azerbaijan takes 800–2,000 hectares (8–20 km^{2}) of land in the conflict area. A ceasefire was signed by both parties and both claim their victory.	Nagorno-Karabakh conflict
Battle of Tipo-Tipo	9 – 14 April 2016 (5 days)	The Abu Sayyaf retreated after their attack and killing 18 soldiers and losing 31 fighters.	Moro conflict
Operation Omari	12 April 2016 – 8 September 2016		War in Afghanistan
West Iran clashes	19 April 2016 – present (10 years, 6 months and 2 weeks)		Kurdish separatism in Iran
Battle of Mukalla	24–25 April 2016 (1 day)	Decisive Saudi-led Coalition victory by capturing Mukalla.	Yemeni Civil War
Battle of Sirte	12 May – 6 December 2016 (6 months, 3 weeks and 3 days)	GNA recaptured 4 towns and villages and Sirte itself from ISIL.	Libyan Civil War
Ar-Rutbah offensive	16 – 18 May 2016 (2 days)	Iraqi Army recapture Ar-Rutbah District/Town.	Iraqi Civil War
Third Battle of Fallujah	22 May – 29 June 2016 (1 month and 1 week)	Iraqi forces recaptured the entire city of Fallujah and its suburbs.	Iraqi Civil War
Battle of Tsorona	12–13 June 2016 (1 day)	Status quo ante both sides claim victory.	Eritrean–Ethiopian border conflict
Wau clashes	23 June 2016 – 31 January 2019		South Sudanese Civil War
Juba clashes	7–11 July 2016 (4 days)	Ceasefire declared.	South Sudanese Civil War
2016–2017 Kashmir unrest	8 July 2016 – February 2017 (6 months, 3 weeks and 3 days)	protests and clashes erupted in some areas of Kashmir Valley between locals and the Indian police and military.	Kashmir conflict
Nampala attack	19 July 2016 (1 week and 3 days)	Ansar Dine and ANSIPRJ killed both 17 soldiers in their army base attack.	Northern Mali conflict
Jani Khel offensive	10 August – 5 September 2016 (3 weeks and 5 days)		War in Afghanistan
Battle of al-Rai	15–20 August 2016 (5 days)	The FSA gains full control over al-Rai after a second offensive.	Syrian civil war
Battle of al-Hasakah	16–23 August 2016 (1 week)	Ceasefire declared. The NDF leaves al-Hasakah and is barred from reentering.	Syrian civil war
Siege of Derna	August 2016 – 28 June 2018	The Libyan National Army captures Derna from the Shura Council of Mujahideen in Derna	Second Libyan Civil War
Battle of Kunduz	3–4 October 2016 (1 day)	The Afghan Army captured the city Kunduz from the Taliban.	War in Afghanistan
Battle of Mosul	16 October 2016 – 20 July 2017 (9 months and 4 days)	The Iraqi Army recaptured the city of Mosul after a 9-month battle from ISIL.	Iraqi Civil War
Muse offensive	20 November – 4 December 2016 (2 weeks)	Rebels capture the town of Mong Ko, but are later forced to retreat by the Myanmar Army.	Internal conflict in Myanmar
2nd Butig clash	26–30 November 2016 (1 month and 4 days)	The Maute Group retreated for the second time from Butig after an attempted attack.	Moro conflict
Oromia–Somali clashes	14 December 2016 – present	In 2016, when Ethiopia redistricted its kebeles, multiple Jarso people voted to move their kebele into Oromia region from Somali Region, leading to Somali minority villagers fleeing into Somali region. Clashes broke out between Oromo and Somali people over control of the kebeles.	Ethiopian civil conflict (2018–present)
Battle of Svitlodarsk	18–23 December 2016 (5 days)	Ceasefire declared. Both sides claim to have repelled the other's attacks.	War in Donbas
Syrian Desert campaign	29 December 2016 – 30 April 2017 (4 months and 1 day)	FSA-led rebels capture more than 1,800 square kilometres (~695 square miles) of territory from ISIL.	Syrian civil war

=== 2017 ===
Battle	Date	Description	Conflict
Fall of Sangin	? January 2017 – 23 March 2017 (2 months, 3 weeks and 1 day)	Taliban capture Sangin from the government.	War in Afghanistan
Palmyra offensive	13 January – 4 March 2017 (1 month, 2 weeks and 3 days)	Syrian Army captures 1,702 square kilometres and 52 settlements, including Palmyra.	Syrian civil war
1st Deir ez-Zor offensive	14 January – 14 February 2017 (1 month)	ISIL cut the road to Deir ez-Zor Airport, splitting the government-held areas of Deir ez-Zor into two parts.	Syrian civil war
East Aleppo offensive	17 January 2017 – 5 April 2017 (2 months, 2 weeks and 5 days)	The Syrian Army captures 250 villages, the city of Dayr Hafir and 2 towns. The FSA captures 6-7 villages and SDF captures 14 villages from ISIL.	Syrian civil war
1st Idlib Governorate clashes	20 January – 9 March 2017 (1 month, 2 weeks and 3 days)	The Tahrir al-Sham captures multiple cities, towns and villages.	Syrian civil war
Battle of Kulbiyow	27 January 2017 (0 days)	Al-Shabaab captures Kulbiyow however the Kenyan army recapture the city within hours later.	War in Somalia War
Raid on Yakla	29 January 2017 (0 days)		Yemeni Civil War
Battle of Avdiivka	29 January 2017 – 4 February 2017 (6 days)		War in Donbas
1st Daraa offensive	First phase 12 February – 8 March 2017 (3 weeks and 3 days); Second phase 6 – 26 April 2017 (2 weeks and 6 days); Third phase 24 May – 6 June 2017 (1 week and 6 days)		Syrian civil war
Operation Ghazi	13 February 2017 – present (9 years, 8 months, 2 weeks and 6 days)		War in North-West Pakistan
Qaboun offensive	18 February – 29 May 2017 (3 months, 1 week and 4 days)	Rebels and pro-government forces made a deal for transporting rebels and their family members to the Idlib Governorate. The Syrian Army takes control of the neighborhoods.	Syrian civil war
2nd Daraa offensive	20 – 27 February 2017 (1 week)	ISIL captured Tasil and two other towns from the rebels.	Syrian civil war
Operation Radd-ul-Fasaad	22 February 2017 – present (9 years, 8 months, 1 week and 4 days)		War in North-West Pakistan
Sinjar clashes	3 March 2017 (0 days)		Iraqi Civil War
Gulf of Sidra Offensive	3 March 2017 – 14 March 2017 (1 week and 4 days)		Libyan Civil War
Eastern Homs offensive	5 March – 12 May 2017 (2 months and 1 week)	The Syrian Army made a buffer zone around Palmyra by capturing more than 230 square miles of territory around the city.	Syrian civil war
Israel–Syria incident	17 March 2017 (0 days)		Syrian civil war
1st Hama offensive	21 March – 28 April 2017 (1 month and 1 week)	The Syrian Army recaptured all lost territory as well as one captured in rebels previous offensive. Including the cities of Taybat al-Imam and Halfaya.	Syrian civil war
Battle of Tabqa	22 March – 10 May 2017 (1 month, 2 weeks and 4 days)		Syrian civil war
Battle of Darzab	9–27 April 2017 (2 weeks and 4 days)		War in Afghanistan
Bohol clashes	11 April 2017 – 15 May 2017 (1 month and 4 days)		Moro conflict
Western Nineveh offensive	25 April 2017 – 27 June 2017 (2 months and 2 days)		Iraqi Civil War
Battle of Mohmand Valley	26–27 April 2017 (3 hours)	Joint US/Afghan raid targeting ISIS compound in Nangarhar Province	War in Afghanistan (2001–present)
East Ghouta inter-rebel conflict	28 April – 31 May 2017 (1 month and 3 days)		Syrian civil war
Kunduz Offensive	? May 2017 – present (9 years, 6 months and 1 day)		War in Afghanistan
Afghanistan–Pakistan border skirmish	5 May 2017 (0 days)		Afghanistan–Pakistan skirmishes
Raid on Barii	5 May 2017 (0 days)		Yemeni Civil War
Syrian Desert campaign	7 May – 13 July 2017 (2 months and 6 days)		Syrian civil war
Maskanah Plains offensive	9 May 2017 – 8 June 2017 (4 weeks and 2 days)		Syrian civil war
Brak El-Shati airbase raid	18 May 2017 (0 days)		Libyan Civil War
Raid on Al Hathla	23 May 2017 (0 days)		Yemeni Civil War
Battle of Marawi	23 May – 23 October 2017 (5 months)		Moro conflict
East Hama offensive	31 May – 18 June 2017 (2 weeks and 4 days)		Syrian civil war
Battle of Raqqa	6 June – 17 October 2017 (4 months, 1 week and 4 days)		Syrian civil war
Battle of Tora Bora	6 – 25 June 2017 (2 weeks and 5 days)		War in Afghanistan
3rd Daraa offensive	7 – 23 June 2017 (2 weeks and 2 days)		Syrian civil war
Battle of Af Urur	8 June 2017 (0 days)		War in Somalia War
Southern Raqqa offensive	13 – 30 June 2017 (2 weeks and 3 days)		Syrian civil war
Jobar offensive	20 June – 14 August 2017 (1 month, 3 weeks and 4 days)		Syrian civil war
Quneitra offensive	24 June – 1 July 2017 (1 week)		Syrian civil war
Pagak offensive	1 July – 25 August 2017 (1 month, 3 weeks and 3 days)		South Sudanese Civil War
2017 Rafah terror attack	7 July 2017	ISIS militants attacked an Egyptian Armed Forces checkpoint in Rafah in North Sinai on 7 July 2017 and resulted in the death of 20 Egyptian soldiers, including the high-ranking officer, Col. Ahmed Mansi. 46 terrorists were killed in the attack.	Sinai insurgency
Central Syria campaign	14 July – 21 October 2017 (3 months and 1 week)		Syrian civil war
2nd Idlib Governorate clashes	14 – 23 July 2017 (1 week and 2 days)		Syrian civil war
Qalamoun offensive	21 July 2017 – 28 August 2017 (1 month and 1 week)		Syrian civil war
Golweyn ambush	30 July 2017 (0 days)		War in Somalia War
Battle of Tal Afar	20 August – 2 September 2017 (1 week and 6 days)		Iraqi Civil War
Inn Din massacre	2 September 2017 (0 days)	the Myanmar Army and armed Rakhine locals in the village of Inn Din, killed Rohingya people accusing them of being members of the Arakan Rohingya Salvation Army	Conflict in Rakhine State, Rohingya genocide
September 11, 2017 Sinai Ambush	11 September 2017	ISIL ambushes an Egyptian military convoy, killing 18 Egyptian soldiers and police officers, also stealing a police truck.	Sinai Insurgency
2nd Deir ez-Zor offensive	First phase 8 September 2017 – 5 March 2018 (5 months, 3 weeks and 4 days); Second phase 1 May – 4 August 2018 (3 months and 3 days); Third phase: Preparations ongoing		Syrian civil war
Eastern Syria campaign	14 September – 17 December 2017 (3 months and 3 days)		Syrian civil war
Battle of Deir ez-Zor	14 September – 17 November 2017 (2 months and 3 days)		Syrian civil war
Western Anbar offensive	16 – 21 September 2017 (5 days)		Iraqi Civil War
Euphrates Crossing offensive	18 September – 21 October 2017 (1 month and 3 days)		Syrian civil war
2nd Hama offensive	19 – 29 September 2017 (1 week and 3 days)		Syrian civil war
Hawija offensive	20 September – 8 October 2017 (2 weeks and 4 days)		Iraqi Civil War
2017 Uvira clashes	27–28 September	MONUSCO and Congolese army forces repel an attack by CNPSC.	Kivu conflict
Tongo Tongo ambush	4 October 2017 (0 days)		Insurgency in the Maghreb
Mayadin offensive	4 – 17 October 2017 (1 week and 6 days)		Syrian civil war
Abu Kamal offensive	23 October – 6 December 2017 (1 month, 1 week and 6 days)		Syrian civil war
Turkish military operation in Idlib Governorate	7 October 2017 – present (9 years, 3 weeks and 5 days)		Syrian civil war
Northwestern Syria campaign	9 October 2017 – 13 February 2018 (4 months and 4 days)		Syrian civil war
Battle of Kirkuk	15 – 20 October 2017 (5 days)		Iraqi–Kurdish conflict
Western Iraq campaign	26 October 2017 – 9 December 2017 (1 month, 1 week and 6 days)		Iraqi Civil War
Battle of Harasta	First phase 14 – 25 November 2017 (1 week and 4 days); Second phase 29 December 2017 – 17 January 2018 (2 weeks and 5 days)	First phase All of the areas captured by the rebels in Harasta were reported by pro-government sources to have been retaken by government forces. Second phase Government forces defended the military base.	Syrian civil war
Isani flat siege	21 – 22 November 2017 (1 day)	The ISIL leader Akhmed Chatayev died in the siege together with 2 others and 1 soldier.	Islamic State insurgency in the North Caucasus
Beit Jinn offensive	28 November 2017 – 2 January 2018 (1 month and 5 days)	Syrian military captures Tal Bardiyah, rebel forces surrender Beit Jinn and leave to Idlib.	Syrian civil war
Battle of Sana'a	28 November – 4 December 2017 (6 days)	Ali Abdullah Saleh was killed by Houthi forces, and the Houthis gain total control of Sanaa.	Yemeni Civil War
Al Hudaydah governorate offensive	6 December 2017 – Present (8 years, 10 months, 3 weeks and 6 days)		Yemeni Civil War

=== 2018 ===
Battle	Date	Description	Conflict	Ref(s)
1st Southern Damascus offensive	5 January – 20 February 2018 (1 month, 2 weeks and 1 day)	ISIL captures 90% of Yarmouk.	Syrian civil war	
Battle of Tukaraq	8 January 2018 (smaller clashes from 15 to 24 May)	The first time both Somaliland and Puntland forces clashed.	Puntland–Somaliland dispute	
Battle of In-Delimane	12 January – 6 March 2018 (1 month, 3 weeks and 1 day)	Over 20 jihadists were killed or captured in an attempt attack.	Northern Mali conflict	
El Junquito raid	15 January 2018 (1 day)	Pro-Government's forces of Venezuela killed six rebels and one woman and lost 3 pro-Government's forces in a raid in the neighborhood El Junquito in Caracas.	Crisis in Bolivarian Venezuela	
Turkish military operation in Afrin	First phase 20 January – 24 March 2018 (2 months and 4 days); Second phase 25 March 2018 – Present (8 years, 7 months, 1 week and 1 day)	First phase Turkish Armed Forces and their allies capture most of the Afrin District (282 towns and villages), including Afrin city.	Syrian civil war	
Battle of Aden	28 – 31 January 2018 (3 days)	STC gains control of most of Aden, on the reach of Al-Mashaiq Palace with support of UAE.	Yemeni Civil War	
Battle of Khasham	7 – 8 February 2018 (1 day)	SDF success defended Khasham.	Syrian civil war	
Comprehensive Operation – Sinai	9 February – October	Egyptian military victory	Sinai insurgency	
1st Israel–Syria incident	10 February 2018 (1 day)	Israeli fighter jets attack additional sites, after an Iranian drone was shot down after entering Israeli airspace, bringing the total to 12 being hit.	Syrian civil war	
Battle of Al-Masini Valley	17 – 18 February 2018 (1 day)	70% of Al Masini valley cleared from AQAP.	Yemeni Civil War	
Rif Dimashq offensive	18 February – 12 April 2018 (1 month, 3 weeks and 4 days)	Syrian army captures the entirety of the rebel-held Eastern Ghouta pocket.	Syrian civil war	
Syrian Liberation Front–Tahrir al-Sham conflict	19 February – 24 April 2018 (2 months and 5 days)	Ceasefire established.	Syrian civil war	
Battle of Batibo	3 March 2018 (1 day)		Anglophone Crisis	
Operation Tigris Shield	10 March 2018 – Present (8 years, 7 months, 3 weeks and 2 days)		Kurdish–Turkish conflict	
2nd Southern Damascus offensive	12 – 20 March 2018 (1 week and 1 day)	ISIL takes control of 90% of al-Qadam, SAA controls one neighborhood.	Syrian civil war	
Araouane clashes	29 March – 6 April 2018 (1 week and 1 day)	French troops killed at least two militant commanders.	Northern Mali conflict	
Siirt raid	29 March 2018 (1 day)	PKK attacked a Turkish military base in Eruh and killed 6 soldiers.	Kurdish–Turkish conflict	
Great March of Return	30 March 2018 – 27 December 2019 (1 year, 8 months, 3 weeks and 6 days)	Clashes between Palestinian protesters and Israeli forces at Israeli-Gaza border leaves hundreds of Palestinians killed and thousands injured.	Gaza–Israel conflict	
MINUSMA super camp attack	14 April 2018 (1 day)	MINUSMA and French troops defend the camp.	Northern Mali conflict	
Northern Homs offensive	15 – 20 April 2018 (5 days)	A Ceasefire was declared and all rebels surrender and withdrawal.	Syrian civil war	
Eastern Qalamoun offensive	17 – 25 April 2018 (1 week and 1 day)	Syrian Army captures the entirety of the rebel-held eastern Qalamoun pocket. And the rebels surrender and evacuate from eastern Qalamoun.	Syrian civil war	
3rd Southern Damascus offensive	19 April – 21 May 2018 (1 month and 2 days)	The Syrian Army captured the entire rebel-held pocket in south Damascus after reaching an evacuation agreement.	Syrian civil war	
Deir ez-Zor Governorate clashes	29 April 2018 (1 day)	SDF recaptures all four villages.	Syrian civil war	
United Arab Emirates takeover of Socotra	30 April – 14 May 2018 (2 weeks)	Two weeks after the takeover on 14 May, Saudi troops were also deployed to Socotra and a deal was brokered between the United Arab Emirates and Yemen for a joint military training exercise and the return of administrative control of Socotra's airport and seaport to Yemen.	Yemeni Civil War	
Gedeo–Guji clashes	April–July 2018 (4 months)	Clashes between the Gedeo people and Gujii clan led to 800,000 Gedeo fleeing their homes.	Ethiopian civil conflict (2018–present)	
Battle of Derna	7 May 2018 – 28 June 2018 (1 month and 3 weeks)	Khalifa Haftar captures Derna from the Shura Council of Mujahideen in Derna.	Libyan Civil War	
2nd Israel–Iran incident	10 May 2018 (1 day)	After Iranian forces reportedly fired around 20 projectiles towards Israeli army positions in the Golan Heights, Israel attacked Iranian bases in Syria.	Syrian civil war	
Battle of Farah	14 – 16 May 2018 (2 days)	Afghan Government's victory and recapturing the city Farah.	War in Afghanistan	
2018 Armenian–Azerbaijani clashes	20-27 May 2018 (7 days)	Azeri forces accused Armenian troops of attacking Nakhchivan.	Nagorno-Karabakh conflict	
Deir ez-Zor offensive	22 May – 11 June 2018 (2 weeks and 6 days)	Pro-Government's forces defend the town Abu Kamal from ISIL.	Syrian civil war	
Battle of Tabarde	3 – 5 June 2018 (2 days)	GATIA/MSA killed 6 ISIL members one of them is commander and Amat Ag Assalate and lost both 3 soldiers.	Northern Mali conflict	
1st As-Suwayda offensive	6 – 22 June 2018 (2 weeks and 2 days)	Syrian Army captures a number of towns, villages and many hills.	Syrian civil war	
Battle of Al Hudaydah	13 June – 13 November 2018 (5 months)	An offensive by the Hadi Government to attack the port city of Al Hudayah and cut off the Houthis from supply lines. At first, Saudi-backed forces capture the town, then lose the airport to the Houthis, and then the Houthis recapture the town.	Yemeni Civil War	
Southern Syria offensive	18 June 2018 – 31 July 2018 (1 month, 1 week and 6 days)	Pro-Government forces capture all the rebels territory.	Syrian civil war	
Battle of Darzab	12 July – 1 August 2018 (2 weeks and 6 days)	Battle between Taliban and the Islamic State's Khorasan Province (ISIL-K), which resulted in a major Taliban victory	War in Afghanistan	
Ndop prison break	28 July 2018 (1 day)	Ambazonian separatists burning down Ndop prison, and liberate 163 inmates, the separatists sized also some weapons and ammunition from the prison.	Anglophone Crisis	
2nd As-Suwayda offensive	6 August – 19 November 2018 (3 months, 1 week and 6 days)	Syrian forces capture the ISIL-held part of As-Suwayda.	Syrian civil war	
Ghazni offensive	10 – 15 August 2018 (5 days)	Government's forces regain control of Ghazni city, but only three districts in Ghazni Province remain under full government control	War in Afghanistan	
Battle of Tripoli	27 August 2018 – 25 September 2018 (4 weeks and 1 day)	A series of clashes in Tripoli end after a ceasefire.	Libyan Civil War	
Syria missile strikes	17 September 2018		Syrian civil war	
2018 Syrian-Turkish border clashes	31 October-6 November 2018	Turkey attacks Kurdish militias in northern Syria, stalling the Deir ez-Zor offensive.	Syrian civil war, Rojava conflict	
2018 Batangafo clashes	31 October-17 November 2018	Anti-balaka and Ex-Séléka groups clashes in Batangafo.	Central African Republic Civil War	
Kerch Strait incident	25 November 2018	Russian Border Guard captures three Ukrainian naval vessels.	Russo-Ukrainian War	

=== 2019 ===
Battle	Date	Description	Conflict	Ref(s)
National Front for Liberation – Tahrir al-Sham conflict	1 January 2019 – 10 January 2019 (1 week and 2 days)	Hayat Tahrir al-Sham, a Sunni militant group, launched attacks on rebel positions in Idlib; the conflict ended when the National Front for Liberation agreed to withdraw on 10 January, allowing the militants to seize the area.	Syrian civil war	
2019 SEAL Team Six operation in North Korea	February 2019 (0 days)	SEAL Team Six aborted the mission after being detected by a North Korean boat, 3 North Korean civilians killed	Korean conflict	
2019 India–Pakistan border skirmishes	14 February – 22 March 2019 (1 month, 1 week and 1 day)	2 Indian fighter jets shot down, Prime Ministers Imran Khan and Narendra Modi agreed on a peace offer on 22 March 2019 ending hostilities.	India–Pakistan wars and conflicts	
Battle of Aden	7 August 2019 – 29 August 2019 (3 weeks and 1 day)	The Southern Transitional Council took Aden and the Presidential Palace despite Saudi and Yemen Army missile strikes.	Yemeni Civil War	
Battle of the Jabara Valley	26 August 2019 – 29 August 2019 (3 days)	1,100 soldiers from the Saudi Army's Al-Fateh Brigade launched an offensive into Yemen's Jabara Valley, but were surrounded by Houthi forces for four days; the Saudis launched airstrikes against Yemeni positions, but failed to break through, and, on 29 August 2019, 100 managed to escape across the border, with the remaining 1,000 killed in action or captured.	Yemeni Civil War	
2019 Western Michoacán clashes	30 August 2019 – 30 August 2019 (0 day)	Indecisive	Mexican drug war	
2019 Dhamar Airstrike	1 September 2019	The Saudi-led coalition launched an airstrike on a university being used as a Houthi detention center; according to the Red Cross, there were 100 fatalities and 40 injured, after which the Houthis were persuaded by the United Nations to release 290 detainees, 42 of whom had survived the airstrike.	Yemeni Civil War	
2019 Abqaiq-Khurais attack	14 September 2019	Houthi officials announced 10 drones had been used to attack two Saudi Aramco oil processing facilities in Eastern Saudi Arabia; Saudi officials said they believed more drones and cruise missiles were used, and that they originated from Iran; the United States and Saudi Arabia have stated that Iran was behind the attack while France, Germany, and the United Kingdom jointly stated Iran bears responsibility for it, while Iran denies involvement.	Yemeni Civil War	
Battle of Culiacán	17 October 2019	Sinaloa Cartel Victory. Ovidio Guzmán López was released.	Mexican drug war	
Operation Kayla Mueller	26 October 2019 – 27 October 2019 (2 days)	The U.S. Joint Special Operations Command's 1st SFOD-D (Delta Force) raided Idlib Province in northern Syria, culminating in the death of Abu Bakr al-Baghdadi.		

== 2020s ==
=== 2020 ===
Battle	Date	Description	Conflict	Ref(s)
Battle of Sirte	6 January 2020 (0 days)	The Libyan National Army captured Sirte from forces loyal to the Government of National Accord.	Second Libyan Civil War	
Battle of Chinagodrar	9 January 2020 (0 days)	A large group of Boko Haram militants assaulted a Nigerien military base in Chinagodrar.	Insurgency in the Maghreb	
Operation Spring Shield	27 February – 6 March 2020 (8 days)	Ceasefire Turkish Armed Forces and their allies capture the strategic Zawiya Mountain and 18 villages Syrian Government forces and their allies capture the strategic Saraqib city and 4 villages	Syrian civil war	
Al Jawf Offensive	29 February – 29 April	Houthi offensive that captured 95% of Al Jawf governate including its capital, Al Hazm.	Second Yemeni Civil War	
Operation Gideon	3 May 2020 – 4 May 2020 (1 day)	Venezuelan dissidents and American private military contractors unsuccessfully attempt to land in Venezuela and remove Nicolás Maduro from office.	Crisis in Venezuela	
Huwaytat-Saudi clashes	13 April	Abdul Rahim al-Huwaiti killed by Saudi security forces, who claimed he had opened fire on them during an operation to evict Huwaytat tribesmen to make way for neom city, eight other Huwaytat tribesmen arrested.	Neom Evictions	
2020-2021 China-India skirmishes	5 May 2020 – 2021	Series of melee skirmishes, face-offs, and high tensions along the Sino-Indian border near Ladakh and Tibet.	Sino-Indian border dispute	
Battle of Talahandak	3 June 2020 (0 days)	French soldiers ambushed an al-Qaeda hideout near the Algerian border, killing the AQIM leader Abdelmalek Droukdel.	Mali War	
July 2020 Armenian-Azerbaijani clashes	12–16 July 2020 (4 days)	Small clash near Tavush, Armenia between Armenia and Azerbaijan where 21 soldiers from both sides perished.	Nagorno-Karabakh conflict	
Mocímboa da Praia offensive	5 August 2020 – 11 August 2020 (6 days)	Militants from Islamic State's Central Africa Province captured the city of Mocímboa da Praia from Mozambican security forces and South African private military contractors.	Insurgency in Cabo Delgado	
Madagiz offensive	27 September 2020 – 3 October 2020 (6 days)	Azerbaijani victory against Armenian forces in the towns of Talish and Madagiz.	Second Nagorno-Karabakh War	
Battle of Hadrut	7 October 2020 – 15 October 2020 (8 days)	Azerbaijani forces took control of Hadrut, and several villages and heights surrounding it.	Second Nagorno-Karabakh War	
4 November Northern Command attacks	4 November 2020 (1 day)	Tigray People's Liberation Front soldiers attack Ethiopian Northern Command headquarters in various cities in the Tigray Region.	Tigray War	
Battle of Shusha	6 November 2020 – 8 November 2020 (2 days)	Azerbaijani forces seized Shusha, the second city of the Republic of Artsakh.	Second Nagorno-Karabakh War	
Battle of Humera	9-11 November 2020	The battle was the first confirmed action involving Eritrean forces during the Tigray War. After Tigrayan forces reportedly abandoned the city, Ethiopian and Eritrean forces took control. Ethiopian forces subsequently massacred the Tigray inhabitants.	Tigray War	
Mekelle offensive	17 November 2020 – 28 November 2020 (11 days)	ENDF forces launched artillery on the Tigrayan capital of Mekelle, hitting mainly civilians.	Tigray War	
2020-2021 Ayn Issa clashes	22 November 2020 – 19 April 2021 (4 months, 3 weeks, 6 days)	Syrian Democratic Forces repel a push by the Turkish-backed Syrian National Army; results inconclusive.	Turkish involvement in the Syrian civil war	

=== 2021 ===
Battle	Date	Description	Conflict	Ref(s)
Siege of Qamishli and Al-Hasakah	10 January – 2 February 2021 (3 weeks, 2 days)	Kurdish Asayish police forces laid siege upon Syrian government-controlled areas of the cities of Qamishli and Al-Hasakah.	Rojava conflict	
Operation Claw-Eagle 2	10-14 February 2021 (4 days)	Turkey attempts to rescue Turkish prisoners held by the PKK in Duhok Governorate. Iraq, but fails.	Kurdish–Turkish conflict (1978–present)	
Battle of Marib	22 February 2021 – present	Struggle between Houthi insurgents and Saudi-backed Yemenis over control of Marib.	Yemeni civil war (2014–present)	
Battle of Doctor Coss	13-14 March 2021 (1 day)	Gulf Cartel soldiers and Los Zetas soldiers, both major cartels in Northern Mexico, clash at the small town of Doctor Coss.	Mexican drug war	
2021 Ataye clashes	18-31 March 2021, 16–18 April 2021	Ethnic conflict between Oromo and Amhara militias during the Tigray War, leading to much of the city of Ataye being destroyed.	Tigray War	
2021 Apure clashes	21 March 2021 – present	Ongoing conflict between Colombian paramilitias and the Venezuelan military.	Venezuelan crisis	
Battle of Palma	24 March 2021 – 5 April 2021 (12 days)	Battle over control of the city of Palma in Mozambique, between the Mozambique Defence Armed Forces, Mozambican security forces and private military contractors against Islamist rebels reportedly associated with the Islamic State of Iraq and the Levant (ISIL). The Islamists invaded the city, killing dozens of people before Mozambique regained control days later.	insurgency in Cabo Delgado	
2021 Kalay clashes	28 March 2021 – ongoing	Clashes between Tatmadaw and anti-coup protestors in Kalay.	Myanmar civil war (2021–present)	
Capture of Aguililla	6 April 2021 – 28 April 2021 (22 days)	CJNG Victory captured Aguililla successfully	Mexican drug war	
2021 Northern Chad offensive	11 April 2021 – 9 May 2021 (4 weeks)	Conflict between Chadian rebels and the government leading in the death of dictator Idriss Déby, and the installation of his son Mahamat Déby.	Insurgency in Northern Chad	
Battle of Qamishli (2021)	20 April 2021 – 26 April 2021 (6 days)	Clashes between the Syrian Armed Forces and the Asayish, the Kurdish police forces.	Rojava conflict	
Clash at Thaw Le Hta	26 April 2021 (0 days)	Clash between Karen National Liberation Army and the Tatmadaw near Thailand-Myanmar border.	Internal conflict in Myanmar	
2021 Kyrgyzstan–Tajikistan clashes	28 April 2021 – 1 May 2021 (3 days)	Small clashes arisen by the installation of Tajik security cameras on a water tower in disputed territory.	Post-Soviet conflicts	
2021 Israel–Palestine crisis	6 May 2021 – 21 May 2021(15 days)	On 6 May 2021, Palestinian and Israeli protestors clashed with each other, eventually causing a police response, which also got involved with the conflict. Hamas delivered an ultimatum to Israel to remove all police forces the Haram al Sharif mosque site and Sheikh Jarrah by 10 May at 6 P.M, in their current timezone. Just a few minutes after this deadline passed, Hamas fired over 150 rockets into Israel, triggering an Israeli response. On 21 May 2021, after constant Israeli bombings, Hamas agreed to a ceasefire between them and Israel.	Israeli–Palestinian conflict	
2021 Rio de Janeiro shootout	6 May 2021	a shootout between Brazilian police and gangs in Rio de Janeiro	Armed conflict for control of the favelas	
Battle of Sambisa Forest	14 – 19 May 2021 (5 days)	ISWAP victory. Sambisa Forest is captured by ISWAP	Boko Haram insurgency	
Battle of Kunduz (2021)	21 June - 11 August 2021 (1 month and 3 weeks)	Taliban forces attack Kunduz, with ANA forces holding out until mid-August.	2021 Taliban offensive	
Battle of Kandahar (2021)	9 July – 16 August 2021 (1 week)	Taliban offense against Kandahar, the second largest city in Afghanistan.	2021 Taliban offensive	
Fall of Herat	28 July – 13 August 2021 (16 days)	Taliban offensive capturing the city of Herat, by the Iranian border.	2021 Taliban offensive	
Battle of Lashkargah	29 July – 13 August 2021 (15 days)	Taliban offensive capturing the city of Lashkargah.	2021 Taliban offensive	
Capture of Zaranj	6 August 2021 (0 days)	Taliban offensive capturing the city of Zaranj.	2021 Taliban offensive	
Fall of Kabul	15 August 2021 (0 days)	Taliban insurgents invaded Kabul following the United States' evacuation of military personnel, swiftly taking the city faster than anticipated.	2021 Taliban offensive	
Turkish airstrikes on Sinjar (2021)	16 August 2021 (0 days)	Turkey strikes Kurdish Sinjar Resistance Units forces in Iraq.	Kurdish–Turkish conflict	
2021 Daraa offensive	29 July – 5 September 2021 (1 month, 1 week, 1 day)	Syrian government victory.	Syrian civil war	
2021 Galmudug clashes	30 September 2021 – ongoing	Skirmishes between the Somali Armed Forces and Ahlu Sunna Waljama'a, a Sufi jihadist militia.	Somali Civil War (2009–present)	
Afar–Somali clashes	28 October 2020 – 23 May 2022 (1 year, 7 months, 6 weeks, and 3 days)	In 2014, Ethiopia redrew the administrative divisions between Afar Region and Somali Region, leading to multiple majority-Somali kebeles being under Afar rule. Because of this, villagers from the Somali region have attempted to regain control of these kebeles, with clashes sometimes even spreading into Djiboutian territory.	Ethiopian civil conflict (2018–present)	
2021 Afghanistan–Iran clashes	1 December 2021 (0 days)	Taliban soldiers accidentally capture multiple Iranian outposts before withdrawing.	Afghanistan conflict (1978–present)	

=== 2022 ===
Battle	Date	Description	Conflict	Ref(s)
2022 Arauca clashes	2 January	The ELN and FARC, both far-left militant groups, fought leaving 23 dead.	Colombian conflict	
Battle of Loikaw (2022)	6 January-8 February	The Burmese junta launches an offensive against Karenni independence groups and anti-junta rebels, but fails to fully weed them out.	Myanmar civil war (2021–present)	
Almaty's gunfight	6 January	On 6 January heavy gunfighting broke out near Republic Square, Almaty between security forces and protesters, CSTO forces were deployed to Kazakhstan to help put down the uprising	2022 Kazakh unrest	
Battle of al-Hasakah (2022)	22 – 26 January	ISIS militants escaped a prison in SDF-controlled areas of Syria, causing a shootout in parts of al-Hasakah.	Syrian civil war, Rojava–Islamist conflict	
2022 Kyrgyzstan–Tajikistan clashes	27 January-20 September	Sporadic clashes between Kyrgyz and Tajik border guards kill 2 Kyrgyz civilians and 2 Tajik border guards between January and June, and injured dozens more on both sides.	Post-Soviet conflicts	
Siege of Djibo	16/17 February-present	AQIM besieges the city of Djibo, in northern Burkina Faso.	Jihadist insurgency in Burkina Faso	
Snake Island campaign	24 February – 30 June	Russian forces seize Snake Island, capturing the 13 man garrison. While Russian forces manage to hold the island, they are repeatedly attacked by Ukrainian forces until they withdraw, to which Russia subsequently bombards Ukrainian forces that retake the island.	Russian invasion of Ukraine	
Battle of Antonov Airport	24 – 25 February	Russian paratroopers failed to capture Hostomel Airport in Kyiv on the first assault, but capture it on the second assault.	Russian invasion of Ukraine	
Battle of Sumy	24 February - 4 April	Russians initially capture Sumy, but are forced to retreat. The city is later besieged and surrounded. However, Ukrainian forces manage to defeat the siege and a battle rages in the northern part of the city for a month.	Russian invasion of Ukraine	
Battle of Kyiv (2022)	24 February – 31 March	Russians enter parts of Kyiv Oblast and the city limits, but are later forced to retreat.	Russian invasion of Ukraine	
Siege of Chernihiv	24 February – 4 April	Ukrainians repel Russian attempt at seizing Chernihiv, causing the Russian forces to begin a siege on Chernihiv. On 31 March, Ukraine manages to break the siege but fighting continued north of the city. On 4 April, Russian forces had fully withdrawn.	Russian invasion of Ukraine	
Battle of Kherson	24 February – 2 March	Russians attempt to take Kherson, fail, and then divert to capture Nova Kakhovka. Later, they capture Kherson but with heavy losses and a still fierce resistance.	Russian invasion of Ukraine	
Battle of Kharkiv (2022)	24 February – 14 May	Russian forces attempt to seize Kharkiv, including shelling civilians to do so. The battle has been described as one of the deadliest in the war. After two months of attempting to surround the city, though, Russian forces were pushed back to the Ukrainian-Russian border in early May.	Russian invasion of Ukraine	
Battle of Okhtyrka	24 February – 26 March	Russians attempt to capture Okhtyrka, but never manage to. Ukrainian forces hold the city during the pullout of Russian forces in late March, but bombing continues.	Russian invasion of Ukraine	
Siege of Mariupol	24 February – 16 May	Russian, Chechen, and rebel forces siege the city from all sides, with fighting destroying 95% of the city and killing as many as 20,000 citizens. By mid-April, the last Ukrainian forces were holed up in the Azovstal steel complex. In mid-May, Azov leader Denys Prokopenko and Ukrainian president Volodymyr Zelenskyy announced that a deal had been reached to evacuate wounded Ukrainian soldiers, and surrender the remaining able-bodied Ukrainian soldiers.	Russian invasion of Ukraine	
Capture of Melitopol	25 – 26 February	Russians capture Melitopol, the first major city to be captured in their invasion. They later abduct and torture the Melitopol mayor, Ivan Fedorov, before releasing him.	Russian invasion of Ukraine	
Battle of Volnovakha	25 February-12 March	Russian and Donetsk People's Republic forces capture Volnovakha. The town is largely destroyed as a result of the fighting.	Russian invasion of Ukraine	
Battle of Hostomel	25 February – 1 April	Russians capture the city on 5 March, but are forced to retreat in late March.	Russian invasion of Ukraine	
Battle of Mykolaiv	26 February – 8 April	Russians, failing to go north, attempt to capture and surround Mykolaiv. While managing to reach as far north as Voznesensk, they are pushed back to the borders of Mykolaiv and Kherson oblasts. Bombing of the city however continues.	Russian invasion of Ukraine	
Battle of Lebedyn	26 February – 4 April	Ukrainians hold the city, although Russians managed to encroach on neighboring villages.	Russian invasion of Ukraine	
Battle of Bucha	27 February-12 March (1st phase) 29-31 March (2nd phase)	Russian forces capture Bucha, forcing a mass exodus of civilians. The occupying forces later massacre much of the town's population, which is discovered by Ukrainian forces in late March.	Russian invasion of Ukraine	
Battle of Makariv	27 February-25 March	Russian forces capture the town of Makariv on the way to capture Kyiv, although are pushed out, leaving 40% of the town destroyed.	Russian invasion of Ukraine	
Battle of Irpin	27 February-28 March	Russian forces capture half of Irpin, and almost all of the population flees. Later, Ukraine reports that the city came under full Ukrainian control following the pullout of the Kyiv offensive.	Russian invasion of Ukraine	
Battle of Enerhodar	28 February 2022 – 4 March	Russians capture Enerhodar, and the largest nuclear power plant in Europe.	Russian invasion of Ukraine	
Battle of Voznesensk	2–3 March	Russians are defeated once and later capture Voznesensk in an attempt to encircle Mykolaiv, but the city is soon recaptured by Ukraine.	Russian invasion of Ukraine	
Battle of Izium	3 March – 1 April	Russian troops capture northern half of the city, but are repeatedly pushed back by Ukrainian troops. After more Russian pushback, the Russians capture the southern half of the city. Ukrainian forces recapture the city bloodlessly on 10 September.	Russian invasion of Ukraine	
Battle of Huliaipole	5 March 2022-January 2026	a long stalemate with constant artillery barrages has left much of the town destroyed, ending with an offensive where Russian took over Huliaipole.	Russian invasion of Ukraine	
Battle of Brovary	9 March – 1 April	Russians push on Brovary, to the east of Kyiv. After a Russian pullout from the north of Ukraine, Ukrainian forces hold the town.	Russian invasion of Ukraine	
Battle of Rubizhne	15 March – 12 May	During fighting in the battle of Donbas, Russian and LPR forces capture 60% of Rubizhne and the nearby town of Kreminna, the southern half of the city being still held by Ukraine. Later, combined LPR-Russian forces captured the whole city, leaving Sievierodonetsk as the last major Ukrainian-held city north of the Donets river.	Russian invasion of Ukraine	
Battle of Marinka	17 March 2022 – 25 December 2023	DPR forces launch an offensive on the city of Marinka, a Ukrainian-held settlement on the outskirts of the city of Donetsk with Ukrainian forces completely withdrawing from the city by 25 December 2023.	Russian invasion of Ukraine	
Battle of Slavutych	18-27 March	Russians "take" Slavutych - it stays under Ukrainian control, but the citizens are forced to turn over their weapons to Russians.	Russian invasion of Ukraine	
Battle of Popasna	18 March – 7 May	Russian forces capture Popasna after a month of fighting, with Ukrainian forces retreating to the north and west of the city. The town is destroyed during the fighting.	Russian invasion of Ukraine	
Siege of Moura	27-31 March	Malian and Russian paramilitary forces lay siege to an ISIS-held town, and commit a massacre against its civilians.	Mali War	
2022 Gadzi clashes	27 March - 11 April	Fulani militias under the 3R militia attack villages.	Central African Republic Civil War	
2022 M23 offensive	27 March 2022-ongoing	M23 rebels in North Kivu launch an offensive backed by Rwanda, causing tensions and clashes between the DRC and Rwanda.	Kivu conflict	
2022 northeastern Russia–Ukraine border skirmishes	6 April 2022-ongoing	After Russian forces left Sumy and Chernihiv oblasts in early April, border clashes have erupted along the Russian and Ukrainian borders there.	Russian invasion of Ukraine	
Operation Claw-Lock	17 April 2022-ongoing	Turkish forces begin an offensive on Kurdish regions of Iraq governed by the PKK.	Kurdish–Turkish conflict (1978–present)	
Battle of Donbas	18 April – September 2022	Russian leaders began a campaign to capture the full territory of the Donetsk and Luhansk oblasts, areas claimed by the separatists, and supposedly create a land border from Russia to the Russian-backed separatists in Transnistria.		
Battle of Plaine du Cul-de-Sac	24 April-6 May	Haitian gang 400 Mawozo attacks Chen Mechan, a rival gang, and attempts to capture a neighborhood loyal to Chen Mechan.	Haitian crisis (2018–present)	
Sinjar clashes (2022)	1-7 May	Iraqi and Kurdish YBŞ forces, after weeks of tensions, clash and Iraqi forces attempt to clear Sinjar of Kurdish militia control. A ceasefire was put in effect, and YBŞ left central Sinjar.	Iraqi conflict (2003–present)	
Battle of the Siverskyi Donets	5-13 May	Russian forces, attempting to cross the strategic Donets river multiple times, are attacked by Ukrainian forces each time in what becomes the deadliest single event for Russians in the war.	Russian invasion of Ukraine	
Battle of Sievierodonetsk	6 May-24 June	Russian and Luhansk forces attempt to capture Sievierodonetsk, destroying 70% of the city's infrastructure. By mid-June, most Ukrainian troops were holed up at the Azot chemical plant, until they retreated on the 24th allowing Russian and LPR forces to seize the city.	Russian invasion of Ukraine	
May 2022 Jenin raid	11 May	IDF raid the Jenin refugee camp, journalist Shireen Abu Akleh shot and killed, Ali al-Samoudi injured	Israeli–Palestinian conflict	
2022 Tripoli clashes	17 May–December	Clashes erupted between forces loyal to prime ministers Fathi Bashagha from the LNA and Abdul Hamid Dbeibeh from the GNA.	Libyan Crisis (2011–present)	
Vila Cruzeiro shootout	24 May	operation by Brazilian police against favela gangs	Armed conflict for control of the favelas	
Battle of Davydiv Brid	27 May-16 June	Ukrainian forces in late May launched a counter-offensive across the Inhulets river in Southern Ukraine. The town of Davydiv Brid saw the most fighting, with control of the town switching back and forth between Ukraine and Russia until the Ukrainian river crossing was destroyed, leaving an assessed Russian victory.	Russian invasion of Ukraine	
2022 Ahrar al-Sham–Levant Front clashes	18-20 June	Two factions of the Syrian National Army clashed over the control of small villages in the Al-Bab countryside. Ended with status quo ante bellum.	Inter-rebel conflict during the Syrian civil war	
2022 Jabal al-Bishrī clashes	20-23 June	Syrian government forces and ISIS clash in central Syria.	Syrian civil war	
Battle of Lysychansk	25 June – 3 July	Russian and LPR forces attempt to storm Lysychansk, the last major Ukrainian-held city in Luhansk Oblast, from the south. On 2 July Russian forced claimed to have seized the city, the following day the Armed Forces of Ukraine stated that they had withdrawn from the city of Lysychansk, marking the end of the battle.	Russian invasion of Ukraine	
Battle of Bakhmut	3 July 2022 – 20 May 2023	Russian and allied forces encroach on the city of Bakhmut. The battle becomes one of the longest and most important of the war, with the entire city of Bakhmut destroyed. Wagnerite forces captured much of the city by 21 May, although Ukrainian forces controlled a sliver of the city limits and conducted attacks on the city's outskirts.	Russian invasion of Ukraine	
2022 Port-au-Prince gang battles	8-9 July	Tensions between rival gangs G-Pep and G9 caused multiple violent outbreaks throughout the Haitian capital of Port-au-Prince.	FRG9 insurgency in Haiti	
2022 al-Shabaab invasion of Ethiopia	20 July - early August	Al-Shabaab, a terrorist group in Somalia, launched an invasion into Ethiopia's Somali Region, although were pushed back.	Ethiopian-Somali conflict and Somali Civil War	
Battle of Pisky (2022)	28 July – 24 August	Russian and DPR forces capture Pisky, a small village on the outskirts of Donetsk that Ukraine had controlled since 2014.	Russian invasion of Ukraine	
Battle of Bambui	31 July	Cameroonian forces launch an offensive into Ambazonian-controlled territory.	Anglophone Crisis	
Battle of Soledar	3 August 2022 – 16 January 2023	Russian and allied forces capture half of Soledar, where the battlefield stalls for months. In early January, a Wagnerite offensive successfully captures Soledar with heavy Ukrainian losses.	Russian invasion of Ukraine	
August 2022 Bam ambush	4 August	Jihadist militants attack Burkinabe forces during a counter-terrorism operation.	Jihadist insurgency in Burkina Faso	
2022 Gaza-Israel clashes	5-7 August	Israel launches a series of airstrikes against Palestinian Islamic Jihad in Gaza, killing 49 Palestinians, including multiple PIJ military leaders.	Gaza–Israel conflict	
2022 Southern Yemen offensive	7 August-19 November	Southern Transitional Council forces capture Shuqrah, Ataq, and other southern towns by late August, and control much of Abyan and Shabwah provinces by November.	Yemeni civil war (2014–present)	
Battle of Lyman (September–October 2022)	3 September-2 October	Ukrainian forces push towards the railroad hub of Lyman, which Russia had captured in late May. Throughout September, Ukraine laid siege to the town, attacking from the south and fighting for small villages north and west of Lyman. After completing an encirclement, Ukraine regained control of the town.	Russian invasion of Ukraine	
Battle of Talataye (2022)	6-7 September	ISGS stormed the town of Talataye briefly capturing it from MSA and JNIM forces.	Mali War	
Bela-Bela shootout	6 September	Attackers killed a farmer and injured his wife, One of the suspects was later killed in a shootout with the South African police in Bela-Bela, while the second was arrested	South African farm attacks	
Battle of Kupiansk	8-16 September	Ukrainian forces reach Kupiansk by 8 September, capturing the western side of the city by 12 September. Fighting continuing in the eastern side, Kupiansk-Vuzlovyi until Ukraine secured the town on 16 September.	Russian invasion of Ukraine	
September 2022 Armenia–Azerbaijan clashes	12-14 September	Azeri forces launch an attack on Armenian border settlements, in a steep escalation since the Second Nagorno-Karabakh War.	Armenia–Azerbaijan border crisis	
2022 Kyrgyzstan–Tajikistan clashes (September)	14-20 September	In an escalation of border clashes from earlier in the year, Kyrgyz officials accused Tajik border guards of taking positions in Kyrgyz territory. Tajik forces allegedly entered border villages in Kyrgyzstan, leading to the deaths of civilians, while Tajik officials accused Kyrgyz forces of attacking a mosque with a Bayraktar TB2.	Post-Soviet conflicts	
Luhansk Oblast campaign	2 October-ongoing	Following the Ukrainian recapture of Lyman and the Kharkiv counteroffensive, Ukrainian and Russian forces battle over villages between Svatove and Kreminna as the frontline stabilizes, with lots of fighting centered at Chervonopopivka and the R66 highway running through it.	Russian invasion of Ukraine	
Battle of Bal'ad	7 October	Somali Army forces repulse an al-Shabaab attack on a Somali military base.	Somali Civil War (2009–present)	
Northern Aleppo clashes (October 2022)	10-19 October	After Hamza Division members killed a man and his pregnant wife in Al-Bab, Third Legion soldiers launched an offensive in northern Aleppo governorate. After capturing Afrin and Jindires, Tahrir al-Sham declared their peace treaty with Third Legion voided.	Inter-rebel conflict during the Syrian civil war	
Battle of Vuhledar	28 October – 1 October 2024	Russian victory.	Russian invasion of Ukraine	
Ungkaya Pukan clash	8-10 November	Clashes broke out between the Philippine Army and Moro Islamic Liberation Front for two days until a ceasefire was signed.	Moro conflict	
Liberation of Kherson	11 November	Following a large-scale counteroffensive and the Russian withdrawal from right bank Kherson Oblast, Ukraine retakes the city of Kherson.	Russian invasion of Ukraine	
Northwestern Syria clashes (December 2022–present)	2 December - present	Tahrir al-Sham launches guerrilla attacks on Syrian Army positions in Idlib, Aleppo, and Hama governorates.	Syrian civil war	
2022 Boala attack	7 December	A skirmish erupts at a market in Boala Department, Burkina Faso, between unknown jihadists and Volunteers for the Defense of the Homeland.	Jihadist insurgency in Burkina Faso	
2022 Yangtse clash	9 December	Non-fatal clashes broke out in Arunachal Pradesh between India and China, with scores of injured.	Sino-Indian border dispute	

=== 2023 ===
Battle	Date	Description	Conflict	Ref(s)
2023 Sinaloa unrest	5–13 January	Cartel violence broke out in Culiacán following the Mexican government arresting Ovidio Guzmán, nephew of Sinaloa drug kingpin El Chapo.	Mexican drug war	
February 2023 Nablus incursion	22 February	Israel conducted a military incursion into the Palestinian city of Nablus	Israeli–Palestinian conflict	
January 2023 Jenin incursion	26 January	Israel conducted a military incursion into the Jenin refugee camp	Israeli–Palestinian conflict	
2023 Al-Aqsa clashes	5 April	A series of violent confrontations between Palestinians and Israeli police at the Al-Aqsa Mosque compound in Jerusalem in Ramadan.	Israeli–Palestinian conflict	
April 2023 Gaza–Israel clashes	5-9 April	Following 2023 Al-Aqsa clashes in Jerusalem, many rockets were fired into Israel from the Gaza Strip, Southern Lebanon, and Syria by Palestinian militants, the IDF bombed these areas in return	Israeli–Palestinian conflict	
Battle of Nyala	15 April–26 October	RSF militants capture the Nyala airport and several eastern neighborhoods, but a truce is brokered by 20 April between the SAF and RSF. While it holds for several weeks, sporadic clashes break out in Nyala in May and June.	War in Sudan	
Battle of Merowe	15–21 April	Rapid Support Forces took control of the airport and city on 15 April. Sudanese Armed Forces sent reinforcements to the city and the RSF fully retreated from the city on 21 April. During the battle, RSF captured several Egyptian Armed Forces soldiers who were not participating in the conflict.	War in Sudan	
Battle of El Fasher	15 April–ongoing	RSF launch attacks on El Fasher, the capital of North Darfur. While they capture parts of the city, a Joint Darfur Force led by Darfur governor Minni Minnawi reverses RSF gains.	War in Sudan	
Siege of El Obeid	15 April–1 September	RSF forces attempt to capture a Sudanese Army garrison in El Obeid, capital of North Kordofan, but fail. However, the city is besieged by 29 May. By August, a SAF offensive reverses RSF gains in the city, and the SAF regains full control of El Obeid by 1 September.	Sudanese civil war	
Battle of Khartoum	15 April 2023 – 26 March 2025	Rapid Support Forces launch attacks on government sites in Khartoum after tensions between RSF leader Hemedti and Sudanese prime minister Abdel Fattah al-Burhan rise over. Battles take place in neighborhoods, markets, military sites, and the Khartoum International Airport.	Sudanese civil war	
Battle of Geneina	15 April–22 June	RSF forces besiege the West Darfuri capital of Geneina, launching attacks on Sudanese forces and Masalit civilians. After capturing the city, allegations of genocide against non-Arab civilians emerge.	Sudanese civil war	
Siege of Zalingei	15 April–31 August		Sudanese civil war	
Battle of Kabkabiya	15–23 April		Sudanese civil war	
May 2023 Gaza–Israel clashes	9-13 May	Israel conducts airstrikes on Gaza after killing several top Palestinian Islamic Jihad members. A ceasefire is held.	Israeli–Palestinian conflict	
Grayvoron incursion	22–23 May	Russian opposition groups allied with Ukraine, including the Russian Volunteer Corps and Freedom of Russia Legion, launch an incursion into Belgorod Oblast towards Grayvoron, capturing the town of Kozinka and other small villages in Grayvoronsky District, but are forced to retreat.	Russian invasion of Ukraine	
Battle of Buulo Mareer	26 May	Al-Shabaab (militant group) militants overrun Ugandan ATMIS base.	Somali Civil War (2009-present)	
2023 Afghanistan–Iran clash	27 May	Taliban and Iranian border guards clash, but both sides resolve it.	Afghan conflict	
Battle of Kutum	30 May–4 June		War in Sudan	
Shebekino incursion	1 June-15 June	Russian opposition groups launch a second incursion in Belgorod Oblast, this time towards Shebekino. While they are forced to retreat from the town, a small strip of Russian territory remains under opposition control.	Russian invasion of Ukraine	
2023 Ukrainian counteroffensive	4 June 2023 – late 2023	Ukrainian forces launch a counteroffensive in eastern Ukraine to retake territory occupied by Russia and recapture 14 villages, but fail to advance further.	Russian invasion of Ukraine	
Battle of Kadugli	8 June–present		Sudanese civil war	
June 2023 Jenin incursion	19 June	Israeli–Palestinian conflict	Israeli soldiers and border police officers raid the Jenin refugee camp	
Wagner Group rebellion	23–24 June	Rebellion fails	Russo-Ukrainian war spillovers	
July 2023 Jenin incursion	3–5 July	Israel conducted a major assault on the Jenin refugee camp	Israeli–Palestinian conflict	
2023 Ain al-Hilweh clashes	30 July – 3 August	Ceasefire reached between Fatah and Al-Shabab Al-Muslim	Palestinian internal political violence	
Be'eri standoff	7-8 October	Hamas captured the town of Be'eri and took dozens of people hostage, forcing Israel into a stand-off. Israel eventually retook the town.	Gaza war	
Battle of Re'im	7 October	Hamas captured the Re'im Army Base, which was later recaptured by Israel later in the day.	Gaza war	
Battle of Sderot	7-9 October	Hamas captured a police garrison in Sderot. Later recaptured by Israel.	Gaza war	
Battle of Sufa	7 October	a Hamas militants attacked Kibbutz Sufa and then overran a nearby military outpost before being retaken by Israel.	Gaza war	
Zikim attack	7 October	Hamas overran two military bases near Zikim, massacred civilians at Zikim beach, and were repelled at Bahad 4 and Zikim kibbutz itself.	Gaza war	
Battle of Avdiivka	10 October 2023 – 17 February 2024	Russian Federation occupied Avdiivka in February 2024.	Russian invasion of Ukraine	
Battle of Beit Hanoun	27 October–24 December	Israeli withdrawal, large parts of Beit Hanoun destroyed	Gaza war	
Siege of Gaza City	2 November – 19 January 2025	Israeli withdrawal	Gaza war	
Battle of Jabalia	8 November – 31 May 2024	Israeli withdrawal	Gaza war	Israeli withdrawal, 70% of Jabalia refugee camp destroyed.
First Al-Shifa Hospital siege	11-24 November	Israeli withdrawal, most of the Al-Shifa Hospital destroyed.	Gaza war	
2023 Bitung clashes	25 November	Pro-Israel Pasukan Manguni Makasiouw targeted a pro-palestine protest resulting in sectarian violence, one Muslim was critically injured and one Minahsan traditional elder was killed by an arrow, a Peace agreement between the two parties was reached	Post-Suharto era in Indonesia, Gaza war protests	
Siege of Khan Yunis	1 December – 7 April 2024	Israeli withdrawal	Gaza war	
Battle of Shuja'iyya (2023)	4–26 December 2023	Israeli withdrawal.	Gaza war	
Battle of Wad Madani	15–19 December	Sudanese government victory.	Sudanese civil war	

=== 2024 ===
Battle	Date	Description	Conflict	Ref(s)
Insurgency in the northern Gaza Strip	7 January 2024 – 19 January 2025	A series of armed engagements centered in the North Gaza Governorate, beginning after Israel announced it had dismantled 12 Al-Qassam Brigades battalions.	Gaza war	
Battle of the Tendra Spit	28–29 February	Ukrainian forces attempted to land on the Tendra Spit in an occupied area in Kherson Oblast but were repelled by Russian forces, suffering heavy casualties in the process.	Russian invasion of Ukraine	
March 2024 Western Russia incursion	12 March – 7 April	Russian anti-government groups launched an incursion from Ukraine into the Kursk and Belgorod oblasts in Russia.	Russian invasion of Ukraine	
Second Al-Shifa Hospital siege	18 March – 1 April		Gaza war	
Battle of Chasiv Yar	4 April 2024 – present	After taking Bakhmut, Russian forces launched an offensive on a strategically important city west of it, Chasiv Yar.	Russian invasion of Ukraine	
Battle of Krasnohorivka	8 April – 9 September	Russia captures the city of Krasnohorivka in Donetsk Oblast afterfive months of fighting.	Russian invasion of Ukraine	
Battle of Ocheretyne	16–28 April	Russia breaks through north and west of Avdiivka, capturing Ocheretyne and multiple other localities.	Russian invasion of Ukraine	
Rafah offensive	6 May 2024 – present	Israel launch a military offensive in and around the city of Rafah as part of its invasion of the Gaza Strip	Gaza war	
2024 Kharkiv offensive	10 May 2024 – present	Russia launches an offensive into northern Kharkiv region, capturing several villages and entering the city of Vovchansk.	Russian invasion of Ukraine	
Battle of Toretsk	18 June 2024 – present	Russian forces launch an offensive in the direction of Toretsk in northern Donetsk Oblast, advancing into satellite settlements east of it.	Russian invasion of Ukraine	
2024 Shuja'iyya incursion	27 June – 10 July		Gaza war	
Pokrovsk offensive	18 July 2024 – present	Russian forces launch an offensive in the direction of Pokrovsk in western Donetsk Oblast, capturing multiple villages and towns.	Russian invasion of Ukraine	
Battle of Tinzaouaten (2024)	25–27 July	CSP-PSD rebels ambushed a convoy of Wagner Group mercenaries and Malian soldiers near Tinzaouaten, resulting in a battle for the commune.	Mali War	
Kursk offensive	6 August 2024 – 16 March 2025	The Armed Forces of Ukraine launched an incursion into Russia's Kursk Oblast and clashed with the Russian Armed Forces, Russian border guard and North Korean soldiers.	Russian invasion of Ukraine	
Operation summer camps	28 August-4 October	Israel launched a large-scale military operation in the West Bank	Gaza war	
2024 Amhara offensive	1 September 2024 – present	Fano rebels launch an offensive in the Amhara Region in the directions of Metemma and Gondar.	War in Amhara	
Battle of Odaisseh	1 October–27 November	Israeli forces withdrew from Odaisseh on 18 February 2025.	Israeli invasion of Lebanon	
Battle of Maroun al-Ras	2 October–27 November	Israeli forces withdrew from Maroun al-Ras on 18 February 2025.	Israeli invasion of Lebanon	
Battle of Ayta al-Shaab	1 October–27 November	Israeli forces withdrew from Ayta al-Shaab on 18 February 2025.	Israeli invasion of Lebanon	
Battle of Kafr Kila	1 October–27 November	Israeli forces withdrew from Kafr Kila on 18 February 2025.	Israeli invasion of Lebanon	
Battle of Ramyah	11 October–27 November	Israeli forces withdrew from Ramyah on 11 January 2025.	Israeli invasion of Lebanon	
Battle of Kurakhove	16 October 2024-early January 2025	Russian forces capture the city of Kurakhove in Donetsk Oblast, Ukraine.	Russian invasion of Ukraine	
Operation Enduring Security (2024)	6-12 November	YPJ and SDF Forces conduct operations against ISIL in and near Al-Hol Refugee Camp, Syria.	Rojava-Islamist conflict	
Velyka Novosilka offensive	11 November 2024 – 28 January 2025	Russia captures Velyka Novosilka and 9 villages in Donetsk and Zaporizhzhia Oblasts.	Russian invasion of Ukraine	
Hamas raid on Abu Shabab	18 November	Hamas' Arrow Unit attacked a group affiliated with Yasser Abu Shabab who they accused of looting aid, at least 20 of Abu shabab's group was killed including his brother	Gaza war	
2024 Syrian opposition offensives	27 November–8 December	The Syrian Opposition captures Damascus, which leads to Fall of the Assad regime. Syrian Opposition creates Syrian caretaker government.	Syrian Civil War	
Battle of Aleppo (2024)	29 November–2 December	The Syrian Opposition captures Aleppo.	Syrian Civil War	
2024 Hama offensive	30 November–5 December	The Syrian Opposition captures Hama and multiple towns in the region.	Syrian Civil War	
Operation Dawn of Freedom	30 November–12 December	SNA capture Tadef, As-Safira, Tell Rifaat, Manbij and numerous other villages.	Syrian Civil War	
Deir ez-Zor offensive (2024)	3–11 December	SDF captures 7 villages of the "Khasham Pocket" on the east bank of the Euphrates and briefly controls Deir ez-Zor city. HTS-led opposition forces seize the cities of Deir ez-Zor, Mayadin and Abu Kamal by 11 December.	Syrian Civil War	
2024 Homs offensive	5–8 December	Syrian opposition forces capture Homs and multiple towns in the region.	Syrian Civil War	
Palmyra offensive (2024)	6–7 December	Syrian opposition forces capture Palmyra.	Syrian Civil War	
Manbij offensive (2024)	6–11 December	SNA captures Manbij city and all of the disputed territory.	Syrian Civil War	
Southern Syria offensive (2024)	29 November – 7 December	Syrian opposition fully capture both the Daraa Governorate and Quneitra region.	Syrian Civil War	
2024–2025 Palestinian Authority operation in Jenin	5 December – 21 January 2025	the Palestinian Authority launch a large-scale operation in the city of Jenin against the Jenin Brigades.	Iran–Israel proxy conflict	
Fall of Damascus (2024)	7–8 December	Syrian Army surrenders the capital to the opposition.	Syrian Civil War	
Hezbollah–Syria clashes (2024–present)	8 December-present		Spillover of the Syrian civil war	

=== 2025 ===
Battle	Date	Description	Conflict	Ref(s)
2025 Catatumbo clashes	16 January – ongoing	On 16 January 2025, National Liberation Army (ELN) militants launched several attacks against FARC dissidents in the Catatumbo region	Catatumbo Campaign	
Iron Wall operation	21 January - present	the IDF launch a large-scale military operation against Palestinian militants in the West Bank.	Gaza war	
Goma offensive	23–30 January	M23 launched an offensive against the regional capital of Goma in the DRC.	M23 offensive	
Bukavu offensive	5–16 February	After taking Goma, the M23 continued its offensive towards the regional capital of Bukavu in the DRC.	M23 offensive	
Uvira offensive	16-21 February	After taking Bukavu, the M23 continued its advances towards the city of Uvira in the DRC.	M23 offensive	
Sumy Oblast incursion	19 February – present	In an effort to counter Ukraine’s offensive in Kursk, Russian forces launched cross-border incursions from Russia into Ukraine.	Russian invasion of Ukraine	
Shabelle offensive	20 February – 10 Aug	Al-Shabaab (militant group) militants take multiple military bases and multiple towns, including Balad.	Somali Civil War (2009-present)	
Battle of Bal'ad	27—28 February	Al-Shabaab (militant group) militants capture Bal'ad.	Somali Civil War (2009-present)	
Druze insurgency in Southern Syria (2025–present)	28 February 2025 – present	Is an ongoing insurgency in southern Syria carried out by Druze militias against the Syrian transitional government. Beginning in early 2025 after the fall of the Assad regime, the conflict centers around a dispute over control of Druze-majority areas in Suwayda Governorate.	Aftermath of the Syrian civil war	
2025 Jaramana clashes	28 February – 2 March	On 28 February 2025, violent confrontations erupted between security forces affiliated with Syria's transitional government and local Druze gunmen in Jaramana, a Damascus suburb with significant Druze and Christian populations. These clashes resulted in one fatality among security forces and nine injuries among Jaramana residents.	Aftermath of the Syrian civil war and Druze insurgency in Southern Syria	
2025 Syria-Lebanon clashes	15—17 March	Syrian forces capture the Lebanese village of Hawch Beit Ismail prompting a military response from the Lebanese army and eventual ceasefire.	Spillover of the Syrian civil war	
2025 Nasir clashes	16 March – 21 April 2025	Clashes broke out in the South Sudanese town of Nasir between members of the South Sudan People's Defence Forces (SSPDF) and the Nuer White Army on 3 March 2025, resulting in the capture of the town's army barracks by the White Army. During an SSPDF evacuation attempt on 7 March, helicopters belonging to the United Nations Mission in South Sudan came under fire, resulting in significant casualties.	Spillover of Sudanese Civil War	
Belgorod incursion	18 March 2025 – ongoing	Ukraine launched a cross-border incursion into Belgorod Oblast, Russia.	Russian invasion of Ukraine	
2025 Malakal Clashes	March 2025 – present	In March 2025, Malakal and surrounding areas in South Sudan witnessed renewed clashes between factions of the South Sudan People's Defence Forces (SSPDF) and the Sudan People's Liberation Army-In Opposition (SPLA-IO)	Spillover of Sudanese Civil War	
2025 India–Pakistan border skirmishes	24 April – 10 May	Following a terrorist attack on tourists visiting the region of Jammu and Kashmir, armed skirmishes between India and Pakistan were reported along the Line of Control (LoC) beginning on 24 April, raising fears of a potential escalation between the two nuclear-armed neighbors. The standoffs were followed by a diplomatic crisis which emerged between the two countries, as India accused Pakistan of sponsoring the attack.	2025 India–Pakistan standoff, the Indo-Pakistani conflicts and the Kashmir conflict	
2025 North Waziristan border clashes	25–28 April	Between 25 and 28 April 2025, Pakistani Armed Forces engaged a large group of militants ("khwarij") attempting infiltration along the Pakistan-Afghanistan border near Hassan Khel, North Waziristan, Khyber Pakhtunkhwa. In two days of clashes, 54 militants were killed, followed by a sanitization operation that eliminated 17 more, raising the total to 71.	Insurgency in Khyber Pakhtunkhwa	
Southern Syria clashes (April–May 2025)	28 April – 4 May	The Rif Dimashq clashes began on 28 April 2025. The initial clashes erupted in the city of Jaramana following tensions related to the circulation of a controversial audio recording, and quickly escalated to nearby areas of Sahnaya and Ashrafiyat Sahnaya. Clashes ended after agreement was reached, including integration of Druze fighters within the Syrian General Security Service.	Aftermath of the Syrian civil war and Druze insurgency in Southern Syria	
2025 Tripoli clashes	12 May – 19 May	On 12 May 2025, clashes broke out in Tripoli, Libya, between the 444th Infantry Brigade and the Stability Support Apparatus (SSA). The fighting began after SSA commander Abdel Ghani al-Kikli was assassinated. This is the first major armed clash in Tripoli since the 2023 Tripoli clashes. On 14 May 2025, a ceasefire was announced with the fighting easing but still occurring. Libya's defense ministry said the ceasefire began in all areas of tension in Tripoli as part of efforts "to protect civilians, preserve state institutions, and avoid further escalation."	Libyan Crisis	
May 2025 Gaza offensive	16 May – 4 August	On 16 May 2025, Israel launched Operation Gideon's Chariots to defeat Hamas and seize most of Gaza using land, air, and sea forces. The campaign failed to destroy Hamas, rescue hostages, or relocate civilians, costing 25 billion shekels without achieving its political goals	Gaza war	
2025 Khan Yunis offensive	26 May – 10 Oct	Israel invades Khan Yunis for the fourth time since the beginning of the war, Israeli forces withdrew from parts of Khan Yunis on 10 October following a ceasefire in Gaza	Gaza war	
Rafah Insurgency	26 May 2025– Present	About 200 Hamas fighters remain holed up in Rafah by November 2025, sporadic fighting continues despite the Gaza peace plan.	Gaza war	
July southern Syria clashes	13 July – 21 July		Aftermath of the Syrian civil war and Druze insurgency in Southern Syria	
2025 Giza shootout	20 July	On 20 July 2025 Egyptian police engaged in a fierce shootout against Hasm Movement militants during a raid on their hideout in Giza	Terrorism in Egypt	
SDF–Syrian transitional government clashes	2 August – present	A series of armed confrontations between the Kurdish SDF and the post-Assad Syrian Army.	Aftermath of the Syrian civil war	
2025 Gaza City offensive	20 August – 4 October	Israel announced a new offensive that aims to take over Gaza city	Gaza war	
2025 Sulaymaniyah clashes	22 August	On 22 August 2025 Security forces in the autonomous Iraqi Kurdistan region arrested opposition figure Lahur talbani on Friday after several hours of armed clashes. Jangi surrendered while his brother Bolad was injured in the leg and was arrested. The clashes killed three members of the security forces and wounded 19	Iraqi–Kurdish conflict	
2025 United States strikes on Venezuelan boats	2 Sep -present	Many Venezuelan boats sunk, at least 100 crew members killed, Venezuelan forces seize a boat full of drugs claiming it was a false flag operation by the DEA	War on drugs operation	
2025 Allenby Bridge shooting	18 Sep	2 IDF soldiers killed at Allenby bridge border crossing, Jordanian attacker killed	Gaza war	
October 2025 Hamas raid in Khan Yunis	3 Oct	Hamas carried out a large-scale raid in Khan Yunis, targeting militants who they accused of collaborating with Israel, Israel targeted Hamas members during the raid	Gaza war	
2025 Afghanistan–Pakistan conflict	9 -19 Oct	Pakistan attempt to assassinate a Pakistani Taliban leader in Afghanistan resulting in conflict between Afghan and Pakistani forces at the border	Afghanistan–Pakistan border skirmishes	
Labbaik Ya Aqsa March clashes	9 -14 Oct	Tehreek-e-Labbaik Pakistan attempted to rally outside Embassy of the United States, Islamabad resulting is a clash with the Pakistani government,11 TLP were killed and dozens more were injured and one police officer was killed in the clashes	Pakistan political unrest, Gaza war protests	
2025 Hamas-Doghmush conflict	10-30 Oct	After a ceasefire between Hamas and Israel went into effect on 10 October, fighting erupted between Hamas and the Doghmush clan who held significant power in Gaza City	Gaza war	
2025 Harem clashes	22-23 Oct	Syria's transitional government under Ahmed al-Sharaa clashes with Firqat al-Ghuraba militants in the city of Harem	Aftermath of the Syrian civil war	
Operation Containment	28 Oct	large-scale operation by the Brazilian government against the Comando Vermelho	Armed conflict for control of the favelas	
Operation Five Stones	26-29 Nov	Israel withdraws after raiding five villages in Tubas Governorate dubbed the "Pentagon of Villages": Tubas, Tammun, the Far'a, 'Aqqaba, and Tayasir.	Gaza war	
New order Operation in the Negev	23 Nov - Present	Israeli police raids Bedouin villages in the Negev to confiscate weapons killing at least one Arab citizens of Israel.	Gaza war	
2025 Beit Jinn clashes	28 Nov	An armed clash between Israeli soldiers and armed residents in Beit Jinn.	Israeli invasion of Syria	
2025 Hadhramaut offensive	2 Dec 2025 - 9 Jan 2026	PLC-Saudi victory	Yemeni civil war	
2025 Rafah ambush	4 Dec	clashes between the Abu Suneima family and the Israeli-backed Popular Forces militia took place near Rafah resulting in the killing of Yasser Abu Shabab.	Gaza war	
2025 Palmyra attack	15 Dec	An ISIS fighter ambushed American troops in Palmyra killing 3 American personnel and injuring 3 American and 2 Syrian soldiers, the attacker was killed by Syrian security forces	War against the Islamic State	
Operation Hawkeye Strike	19 Dec 2025– 16 April 2026	US launch strikes against ISIS, in response to the 2025 Palmyra attack with the help of Jordan hitting 106 targets and killing Bilal al-Jasim.	War against the Islamic State	
Aleppo clashes (2025–2026)	22-26 Dec	Ceasefire between the Syrian government and SDF	Aftermath of the Syrian civil war	
Jonglei clashes	24 December-Present	Government troops launch an offensive against Nuer White Army-held areas in Jonglei	Ethnic violence in South Sudan	

=== 2026 ===
Battle	Date	Description	Conflict	Ref(s)
2026 United States intervention in Venezuela	3 January	The US launched airstrikes on multiple locations in Venezuela, including Caracas and captured Nicolás Maduro and his wife	War on drugs	
Aleppo clashes (2025–2026)	6-10 January	Syrian government captures Sheikh Maqsood, Ashrafiyah and Bani Zaid neighbourhoods in Aleppo	Aftermath of the Syrian civil war	
Kermanshah Clashes	10 January	8 Iranian Basij members killed by the Kurdistan Free Life Party militants in Kermanshah.	2026 Kurdish–Iranian crisis	
2026 northeastern Syria offensive	13-30 January	Raqqa and Deir ez-Zor Governorates are ceded to the Syrian government	Aftermath of the Syrian civil war	
January 2026 Diori Hamani International Airport attack	29 January	ISIS launched a large scale attack on Diori Hamani International Airport in Niamey, Niger's government accuse France of sponsoring the attack.	War in the Sahel	
2026 Jalisco operation	22 February	the Jalisco New Generation Cartel leader "El Mencho" is killed by the Mexican military.	Mexican drug war	
2026 Mexico cartel unrest	22-23 February	Clashes between the Mexican Army and the Jalisco New Generation Cartel after the killing of El Mencho	Mexican drug war	
2026 Strait of Hormuz crisis	28 February - present	Iran launches attacks on US military bases, and other Gulf states, while issuing warnings prohibiting vessel passage through the Strait of Hormuz.	2026 Iran war	
2026 attack on the United States consulate in Karachi	1 March	The US Consulate in Karachi, Pakistan, was targeted by Shia protesters following the assassination of Ali Khamenei. As the protesters approached the consulate and breached the outer wall, the Marine Security Guards opened fire, killing at least 10 protesters.	2026 Iran war spillovers	
2026 United States F-15E rescue operation in Iran	3-5 April	Pilots rescued, 10 US aircraft damaged or destroyed.	2026 Iran war	
Battle of Bint Jbeil (2026)	9 April - 12 May	Around 90% of urban area of Bint Jbeil destroyed.	2026 Lebanon war	
2026 Mali Attacks	25 April - 1 May	Series of coordinated attacks by JNIM and the FLA, resulting in the FLA gaining control of Kidal.	Mali War	
Battle of Haddatha	19 - 21 May	Hezbollah victory, Israeli withdrawal.	2026 Lebanon war	
Battle of Zawtar al-Sharqiyah	27 - 31 May	Israeli victory, capture of Beaufort Castle.	2026 Lebanon war	
Battle of Anéfis (2026)	4-9 July	Anefis recaptured by Malian forces supported by Africa Corps (Russia), surroundings of the city captured by FLA forces.	Mali War	
2026 Nablus settlers raid	24 July	Israeli settlers raid the Palestinian town of Tell, Nablus resulting in a shootout that killed four Palestinians and two Israelis (including a soldier), launching of a military campaign and a wave of settler violence against Palestinian villages.	Israeli–Palestinian conflict	
2026 Yemen offensives	3 September - present	The Houthis launch an offensive against the government of Yemen.	Houthi–Saudi conflict	
2026 Kohat attack	18-19 September	armed insurgents attacked and occupied a Police complex in Kohat, a Pakistani Army joint operation cleared the complex from the militants.	Insurgency in Khyber Pakhtunkhwa	
2026 Ethiopian offensive	23 September - present	Coalition of various Ethiopian rebel and insurgent groups, launched a large-scale military offensive against the Ethiopian government.	Ethiopian civil conflict	
2026 Yehuda Junction shooting	23 October	Palestinian gunmen attack an Israeli Junction outside Hebron, 2 Israeli soldiers and the 2 gunmen are killed. Israeli government announce the 2026 West Bank lockdown.	Israeli–Palestinian conflict	

== See also ==
- List of wars: 2003–present
