= Battle of Khirbet Al-Joz =

Military operation

- Part of Idlib Governorate clashes (June 2012–April 2013) (Syrian Civil War)
Date	6 October 2012
Location	Idlib Governorate, Syria
Result	Rebel victory

Belligerents
(Syria) Syrian Arab Republic: Syrian Arab Army	(Syria) Free Syrian Army

Commanders and leaders
unknown	Abu Baeda (Kaws al-Nasser Brigade commander); Abdelwahed Wahud(Army defector)

Units involved
45th Army Regiment	unknown

Strength
110 soldiers	250 fighters

Casualties and losses
40 killed	9 killed
- Total: 50 killed

The Battle of Khirbet Al-Joz was fought between forces of the Syrian Army and the FSA for control of the town. On 6 October 2012, the FSA launched an attack on the government occupied village of Kherbet Eljoz, near the Turkish border. The FSA took control of the village after a 12-hour-long battle with government forces.

== Background ==
In June 2011, the Syrian military attacked the town, with 40 tanks in a crackdown against supposed pro-democracy protesters.

== Battle ==
=== Rebel offensive ===
On 6 October, rebels launched an offensive on the border village Khirbet al-Joz in the Idlib Governorate. The FSA was said to first attacked a government border outpost just west of the village. Which left 3 rebels and 15 government soldiers dead. Fighting later intensified in Khirbet al-Joz itself, as rebels attempted to retake the village. Activists claimed that the rebels had captured a 3-story high water tower in the center of Khirbet al-Joz, after 12 hours of fighting with government forces.

On 7 October, the FSA released a statement indicating that they have taken full control of Khirbet al-Joz and its surroundings. The Syrian Observatory for Human Rights confirmed the capture and put the number of dead at 40 soldiers, including 5 officers and 9 rebels.

== Aftermath ==
In late October, the Syrian army conducted a series of airstrikes on rebel positions near Khirbet al-Joz.
