= Battle of Asadabad =

2014 battle between Afghanistan and the Taliban

Coordinates: 34.7000°N 70.7500°E

- Part of the Taliban insurgency and War in Afghanistan (2001–2021)
Date	February 23, 2014
Location	Asadabad, Afghanistan
Result	Taliban victory: Heavy Afghan losses

Belligerents
Afghanistan	(Afghanistan) Taliban

Commanders and leaders
(Afghanistan) Muhammed Zahir Azimi †	(Afghanistan) Unknown

Units involved
2 outpost garrisons 1st Kunar Infantry Battalion	No reliable source

Strength
~30 soldiers (outpost garrisons); 200 reinforcements	Hundreds of insurgents

Casualties and losses
21 killed 1 wounded 5 missing	1 killed

On 23 February 2014, Taliban insurgents supported by Afghan insiders raided two ANA checkpoints located outside the city of Asadabad in the Ghaziabad District of Kunar province, Eastern Afghanistan. The raid marked the deadliest attack against Afghan security forces since 2010.

== Engagements ==
Hostile heavily armed Taliban insurgents raided two Afghan military checkpoints near one another in an insider led operation. On Sunday morning at approximately 5:00 a.m local time, Taliban fighters targeted two ANA outposts the first one of which was guarded by four insiders who helped plan and operate the attack. Taliban numbers were sourced at hundreds coming from the Pakistani border mountains. At the first checkpoint insiders who defected to the Taliban side joined them in raiding the outpost. At the time of the raid the insiders helped carry out the killing of the entire outpost garrison while the majority were still asleep in their bunks. The checkpoint was taken without resistance or casualties on the Taliban side.

After the first checkpoint was raided Taliban insurgents and defectors attacked the second which was the outpost for approximately 17 Afghan soldiers located along the same road outside Asadabad which veered off a steep cliff. The second checkpoint which heard gunfire coming from the first transmitted backup calls that made it through to the ANA headquarters in Kunar which called for a battalion of troops to secure the area and reinforce the second checkpoint of possible attack. Ten minutes after the first raid the second outpost came across small-arms fire from all sides of the road. Resisting ANA troops were eventually outgunned before ANA reinforcements could arrive to relieve them. Morale also worsened after the Afghan base commander of the outpost, Colonel Muhammed Zahir Azimi was killed by hostile fire. Nine soldiers were taken alive while the rest were KIA. This number was later lowered to five MIA unaccounted for, who were later presumed dead while in Taliban custody.

It is known only one Taliban fighter died in the battle for the second checkpoint after a failed attempt at detonating explosives. The second checkpoint was looted and the insurgents managed to take away dozens of ANA weapons and supplies. ANA battalion Kunar infantry reinforcements arrived in time to combat the remaining insurgents who fled back to the mountains undetected. No casualties were reported in this engagement. The first stages of a counter-attack were set in place to rescue the five MIA. In both raids only one Afghan soldier survived at the second checkpoint who was able to confirm infiltrators were behind the attack. The soldier was able to evade possible death and escape Taliban custody.

== Aftermath ==
Afghan defense minister acknowledged that insiders in the ANA helped organize and plan the attack which involved foreign Taliban fighters who were trained in Pakistan in preparation for the attack. A funeral was held in Kabul followed by several days of mourning for the garrison.
