= SLA December 2006 offensive =

- Part of the Sri Lankan Civil War
Date	4–9 December 2006 (5 days)
Location	Vaharai and villages in Trincomalee District, Sri Lanka
Result	Tamil Tiger victory

Belligerents
Sri Lanka Army	Liberation Tigers of Tamil Eelam

Casualties and losses
70 killed 175 wounded	4 killed (LTTE claim)

In December 2006, the Sri Lanka Army (SLA) launched multi-pronged attacks in an attempt to capture territory in Vaharai and the Trincomalee District held by the Liberation Tigers of Tamil Eelam (LTTE).

== Timeline ==
At least 40 civilians were killed during the Sri Lankan bombardment.
