= Kherbet Eljoz =

Kherbet Eljoz خربة الجوز
- Village
- Location in Syria
- Coordinates: 35°54′17″N 36°11′31″E
- Country: Syria
- Governorate: Idlib
- District: Jisr al-Shughur District
- Subdistrict: Bidama Nahiyah

Population (2004)
  - Total: 1,644
- Time zone: UTC+2 (EET)
  - Summer (DST): UTC+3 (EEST)
- City Qrya Pcode: C4231

Kherbet Eljoz (Arabic: خربة الجوز) is a Syrian village located in Bidama Nahiyah in Jisr al-Shughur District, Idlib. According to the Syria Central Bureau of Statistics (CBS), Kherbet Eljoz had a population of 1644 in the 2004 census.
