= Battle of Bhalubang =

Military battle

- Part of the Nepalese Civil War
Date	13 October 2003
Location	Bhalubang, Dang District, Nepal
Result	Nepal victory

Belligerents
Kingdom of Nepal	Communist Party of Nepal (Maoist), now (since 2009) the Communist Party of Nepal (Maoist Centre)

Casualties and losses
(Nepal) 40 killed	40 killed

Battle of Bhalubang was fought on 13 October 2003 in Bhalubang, Nepal, between the Kingdom of Nepal and the Communist Party of Nepal (Maoist), as the current Communist Party of Nepal (Maoist Centre) was known at the time. It resulted in the government victory and about 40 soldiers died from both sides.
