= Battle of Kondaoui =

Coordinates: 18.9050°N 3.5283°W

- Part of Northern Mali conflict
Date	22–23 January 2014 (1 day)
Location	Kondaoui, Mali
Result	French Victory

Belligerents
France	Islamic Maghreb

Strength
100	Unknown

Casualties and losses
1 wounded	11 killed 2 pick-ups destroyed

On 22 January 2014, a strong French column of more than a hundred soldiers transported by armored vehicles left the city of Timbuktu and turned towards the northwest, then east after traveling fifty kilometers.

On the night of January 22/23, the French attacked a group of jihadists in the desert about 130 kilometers north of Timbuktu. The fight took place south of the village of Kondaoui, where the jihadists probably came to stock up on food and water. One resident said the French attacked with Special Forces soldiers backed by helicopters.

Officially, according to the French general staff, a dozen "terrorists" were killed and a French soldier was injured as a result of an "act of opportunity." According to French and Malian military, the toll was more precisely 11 dead on the rebel side and a Salafi injured prognosis uncommitted for the French. In addition, two pickup jihadists were destroyed. At least one of the dead jihadists was identified as Algeria's Abdelkader Ben Boucha, 33, from El Oued.
