= Battle of Ebrahimkhel =

2008 battle during the War in Afghanistan

Coordinates: 32.136°N 66.909°E

- Part of War in Afghanistan (2001–2021)
Date	August 8, 2008
Location	Ebrahimkhel, Zabul Province, Afghanistan
Result	Coalition victory

Belligerents
United States (Afghanistan) Afghan National Army; Netherlands	(Afghanistan) Taliban (Afghanistan) Al-Qaeda

Strength
35 Afghan soldiers Small U.S. advisory team 2 Dutch F-16s	~300 insurgents

Casualties and losses
None reported	At least 25 killed

The Battle of Ebrahimkhel took place on August 8, 2008, in Qalat Province, Afghanistan, during the War in Afghanistan (2001–2021). A small U.S. and Afghan force, including Staff Sgt. Jason Kimberling of the U.S. Air Force, engaged an estimated 300 Taliban and Al-Qaeda fighters in a prolonged and intense firefight.

== Background ==
Staff Sgt. Jason Kimberling was deployed as a security forces member assigned to a Police Mentor Team in Afghanistan. On August 8, while operating near the village of Ebrahimkhel, his unit came under heavy enemy fire. Kimberling was one of only a few U.S. troops embedded with a larger Afghan force tasked with pursuing insurgents who had previously attacked a nearby checkpoint.

== The Battle ==
During the mission, Kimberling and his team were ambushed by a large insurgent force using small arms, rocket-propelled grenades, and mortars. Despite being outnumbered nearly ten to one, Kimberling repeatedly exposed himself to enemy fire in order to direct Afghan forces, return fire, and coordinate defensive actions.

At one point, Kimberling ran through open terrain under heavy fire to reach a disabled vehicle and help evacuate wounded personnel. Throughout the two-hour battle, he provided leadership and firepower that helped hold off the attacking insurgents until reinforcements arrived, including air support from two Dutch F-16s launched from Bagram Airfield.

== Aftermath ==
The engagement resulted in the deaths of at least 25 insurgents and the eventual withdrawal of enemy forces. No Coalition fatalities were reported. Staff Sgt. Jason Kimberling was later awarded the Bronze Star Medal with Valor for his actions during the battle, recognizing his courage, leadership, and effectiveness under fire.
