= Battle of Elwaq =

2011 battle in Elwaq, Somalia

- Part of the War in Somalia (2009-present)
Date	September 9–10, 2011
Location	Elwaq, Somalia
Result	Somali Government Victory: Somalia retakes town from Islamists

Belligerents
Somalia; Somali National Army; Kenya	Al-Shabaab

Strength
140	Unknown

Casualties and losses
(Somalia) 70 soldiers killed, 10 technicals (Al-Shabaab claim)	30 killed

On 9 September 2011, an army of Al-Shabaab fighters attacked the Somali town of Elwaq, resulting in the deaths of 12 soldiers. Within 8 hours, the Islamists army claimed they had full control of Elwaq and that the remaining Somali soldiers fled the town. The next day, Somali troops attempted to recapture the town from Islamists militants. After hours of fighting, the Islamists reportedly fled the town on technicals. Al-Shabaab claimed that they killed 70 Somali soldiers and that they captured 10 military vehicles. The bodies of 30 Islamists were later discovered by the army, the dead including 8 children.
