= Battle of Hamakouladji =

Coordinates: 16.2508°N 0.2058°W

- Part of the 2012 Northern Mali conflict
Date	4 May 2013
Location	near Gao, Mali
Status	Indecisive

Belligerents
Mali	MUJAO

Casualties and losses
2 killed 4–8 wounded	5 killed

The Battle of Hamakouladji was a skirmish fought between a unit of the Malian army and MOJWA jihadists that took place in the Malian village of Hamakouladji, located 40 km (25 miles) north of Gao, in the municipality of Tilemsi.

According to Colonel Kassim Goita, a senior commander in the Malian army around the Gao Region, clashes began at around 1:30 p.m and continued for a ten-minute period when a group of Malian soldiers pursued a suspicious man on a motorcycle after he failed to stop at an army checkpoint just on the outskirts of town for a routine identity check. The motorcyclist eventually gave way. While the motorcyclist was being searched and interrogated by soldiers an unidentified vehicle filled with gunmen surged forward spraying the troops with gunfire. This served as a temporary distraction allowing the motorcyclist to detonate the explosive belts he was wearing mortally instantly killing two soldiers and severely wounding four others. By 1:40 p.m, the MOJWA gunmen in the unmarked car were all reported killed supposedly before they had enough time to remotely detonate a car bomb.
