= List of military operations in the war in Afghanistan (2001–2021) =

The United States launched an invasion of Afghanistan following the September 11 attacks from October 7, 2001, to August 31, 2021, as a part of the war on terror. Participants in the initial American operation, Operation Enduring Freedom, included a NATO coalition whose initial goals were to train the Afghan National Security Forces (ANSF) and assist Afghanistan in rebuilding key government institutions after the fall of the Taliban regime in December 2001. However, coalition forces were gradually involved in the broader war as well, as Taliban resistance continued until 2021, when they regained control of the country and formed a new government. This is a list of known code names and related information for military operations associated with the war, including operations to airlift citizens of coalition countries and at-risk Afghan civilians from Afghanistan as the war drew to a close.

== Background ==
From May 1996, Osama bin Laden had been living in Afghanistan along with other members of al-Qaeda, operating terrorist training camps in a loose alliance with the Taliban. Following the 1998 US embassy bombings in Africa, the US military launched cruise missiles at these camps with limited effect on their overall operations. A follow-on plan, Operation Infinite Resolve, was planned but not implemented. The UN Security Council issued Resolutions 1267 and 1333 in 1999 and 2000, respectively, applying financial and military hardware sanctions to encourage the Taliban to turn over bin Laden to appropriate authorities for trial in the embassy bombings, as well as to close terrorist training camps.

After the September 11, 2001, attacks, investigators rapidly accumulated evidence implicating bin Laden. In a taped statement released in 2004, bin Laden publicly acknowledged his and al-Qaeda's direct involvement in the attacks. On May 21, 2006, an audiotape attributed to bin Laden was released on a website (the US alleged) known to be used by al-Qaeda affiliates. In it, bin Laden claimed personal responsibility for selecting and directing the 19 hijackers. who carried out the 9/11 attacks, reaffirming Bin Laden's central role in the plot.

== 2001: War begins ==
U.S. Army infantrymen in the Korengal Valley, Kunar Province.

The war in Afghanistan began on October 7, 2001, as Operation Enduring Freedom, in response to the 9/11 attacks. This conflict marked the beginning of the US war on terror. The stated purpose of the invasion was to capture Osama bin Laden, destroy al-Qaeda, and remove the Taliban regime, which had provided them support and safe harbor. In December, the Taliban government fell and a transitional government was established.

=== Coalition operations ===
- Operation Crescent Wind
- Operation Relentless Strike
- Operation Rhino

=== Battles ===
- Fall of Mazar-i-Sharif
- Siege of Kunduz
- Fall of Kabul (2001)
- 2001 uprising in Herat
- Battle of Tarin Kowt
- Fall of Kandahar
- Battle of Qala-i-Jangi
- Battle of Tora Bora

== 2002 operations ==
=== Coalition operations ===
- Operation Accius
- Operation Anaconda (includes Operation Harpoon, and the Battle of Takur Ghar)
- Operation Glock
- Operation Polar Harpoon
- Operation Jacana
  - Operation Ptarmigan
  - Operation Snipe
  - Operation Condor
  - Operation Buzzard
- Operation Mountain Lion
- Operation Mountain Sweep
- Raid on Hazar Qadam

=== Insurgent attacks ===
- Kabul

== 2003 operations ==
=== Coalition operations ===
- Operation Mongoose
- Operation Tsunami
- Operation Eagle Fury
- Operation Viper
- Operation Desert Lion
- Operation Haven Denial
- Operation Athena
- Operation Warrior Sweep
- Operation Mountain Resolve
- Operation Mountain Viper
- Operation Avalanche
- Operation Headstrong
- Operation Valiant Strike

== 2004 operations ==
- Operation Asbury Park
- Operation Asbury Park II
- Operation Flashman
- Operation Headstrong
- Operation Lightning Resolve
- Operation Mountain Blizzard
- Operation Mountain Storm

== 2005 operations ==
- Operation Archer
- Operation Argus
- Operation Spurs
- Operation Mavericks
- Operation Celtics
- Operation Red Wings
- Operation Red Wings II
- Operation Whalers

== 2006 operations ==
In January 2006, NATO's focus in southern Afghanistan was to form Provincial Reconstruction Teams with the British leading in Helmand Province and the Netherlands and Canada leading similar deployments in Orūzgān Province and Kandahar Province, respectively. The Americans remained in control of Zabul Province. Local Taliban figures voiced opposition to the incoming force and pledged to resist it.

=== Coalition Operations ===
- Operation Mountain Thrust
- Operation Kaika
- Operation Perth
- Operation Medusa
- Operation Falcon Summit
- Operation Mountain Lion- Afghan Coalition forces, Korengal Valley. 1st Batallion 3rd Marines

=== Insurgent attacks ===
- 2006 Taliban offensive

=== Battles ===
- Battle of Lashkagar
- Battle of Panjwaii
- Siege of Sangin
- Battle of Nawzad
- Operation Cobra Strike

== 2007 operations ==
US and NATO ISAF operations, alongside Afghan National Army forces, continued against the Taliban in 2007. Significant military operations in 2007 included operations around Sangin, Operation Achilles, the Battle of Chora, Operation Harekate Yolo and the Battle of Musa Qala, among others.

=== Coalition operations ===
- Operation Achilles
- Operation Commando Fury
- Operation Hammer
- Operation Harekate Yolo
- Operation Hoover
- Operation Kryptonite
- Operation Luger
- Operation Pickaxe-Handle
- Operation Rock Avalanche
- Operation Silver (2007)
- Operation Volcano

=== Insurgent attacks ===
- Operation Kamin
- Operation Nasrat
- Bagram Air Base
- Baghlan

=== Battles ===
- Battle of Musa Qala
- Battle of Chora
- Battle of Firebase Anaconda
- Battle of Aranas

== 2008 operations ==
Significant military operations in 2008 included the Helmand province campaign, Operation Karez, and Operation Eagle's Summit, among others.

=== Coalition operations ===
- Operation Sohil Laram III during March and April around Hutal
- Operation Sur Kor (Red House) during April in Zari District
- Operation Karez during May in Badghis Province
- Operation Oqab Sterga (Eagle's Eye) during May around Grishk
- Operation Janub Zilzila (Southern Edge) during June in Mizan District, Zabul Province
- Operation Eagle's Summit (Oqab Tsuka) during August and September in Kandahar and Helmand Provinces
- Operation Sond Chara (Red Dagger) during December in Helmand Province

=== Insurgent attacks ===
- Hotel Serena
- Kandahar
- Indian Embassy
- Uzbin Valley ambush
- Balamorghab ambush
- Sarposa Prison attack
- Spin Boldak bombing

=== Battles ===
- Battle of Arghandab
- Battle of Garmsir
- Gora Prai airstrike
- Battle of Shewan
- Battle of Shok Valley
- Battle of Wanat

== 2009 operations ==
A June 2009 grenade attack, following a collision between a MRAP and a humvee, wounding three American soldiers.

=== Coalition operations ===
- Counterinsurgency in Northern Afghanistan
- Operation Aabi Toorah (Blue Sword) 2C
- Operation Tor Tapus 2
- Operation Cobra's Anger
- Operation Diesel
- Operation Khanjar (Strike of the Sword)
- Operation Oqab (Eagle)
- Operation Panchai Palang (Panther's Claw)
- Operation Sarack (May)
- Operation Shahi Tandar

=== Insurgent attacks ===
- Kabul raid
- Kandahar
- Indian Embassy
- UN guest house
- Camp Chapman attack

=== Battles ===
- Battle of Dahaneh
- Battle of Alasay (Operation Dinner Out)
- Battle of COP Keating
- Battle of Ganjgal
- Battle of Sabzak

== 2010 operations ==
=== Coalition operations ===
- Operation Baawar
- Operation Bulldog Bite
- Operation Burnham
- Operation Dragon Strike
- Operation Moshtarak (Battle of Marja)
- Operation Tor Shezada
- Operation Halmazag
- Operation Hamkari
- Operation Mountain Reach II (Battle of Daridam)

=== Insurgent attacks ===
- Kabul attack (Jan)
- Kabul attack (Feb)
- Kabul bombing
- Nadahan wedding bombing

=== Battles ===
- Battle of Derapet
- Battle of Sangin (2010)

== 2011 operations ==
=== Coalition operations ===
- Operation Hammer Down
- Operation Thunder Doom

=== Insurgent attacks ===
- Logar
- Kabul hotel
- Nimruz
- Zabul
- Kabul (Sep)
- Kabul & Mazar-e-Sharif

=== Battles ===
- Battle of Do Ab
- Battle of Doan
- Battle of Barawala Kalay Valley

== 2012 operations ==
=== Coalition Operations ===
- Raid on Kunar

=== Insurgent attacks ===
- Hostage incident at Lake Qargha
- Raid on camp bastion (2012)
- Forward Operating Base (2012)

=== Battles ===
- Battle of Baghak

== 2013 operations ==
=== insurgent attacks ===
- Farah
- Kabul court
- Kabul Palace
- Jalalabad
- Herat

== 2014 operations ==
=== insurgent attacks ===
- Kabul Restaurant attack
- Kabul Serena Hotel shooting
- 2014 attack on Indian consulate in Herat
- 2014 Bagram Airfield bombing
- 2014 Paktika car bombing
- 2014 Yahyakhel suicide bombing
- December 2014 Kabul bombings
- Kabul Serena Hotel Shooting

=== Battles ===
- Kunar Offensive

== 2015 operations ==
=== insurgent attacks ===
- Jalalabad suicide bombing
- 2015 Park Palace guesthouse attack
- 2015 Kabul Parliament attack
- 2015 Khost suicide bombing
- 7 August 2015 Kabul attacks
- 10 August 2015 Kabul suicide bombing
- 22 August 2015 Kabul suicide bombing
- Ghazni prison escape
- 2015 Kandahar Airport bombing
- 2015 Spanish Embassy attack in Kabul
- 2015 Bagram Airfield bombing

=== Battle ===
- Battle of Kunduz (2015)

== 2016 operations ==
=== insurgent attacks ===
- Operation Omari
- April 2016 Kabul attack
- Kabul attack on Canadian Embassy guards
- 30 June 2016 Afghanistan bombings
- July 2016 Kabul bombing
- American University of Afghanistan attack
- Kabul Defense Ministry (2016)
- 2016 bombing of the German consulate in Mazar-i-Sharif
- 2016 Bagram Airfield bombing

=== Battles ===
- Battle of Boz Qandahari
- Battle of Kunduz (2016)
- Nangarhar offensive (2016)
- Battle of Tarinkot (2016)

== 2017 operations ==
=== insurgent attacks ===
- Kunduz Offensive (2017)
- January 2017 Afghanistan bombings
- 2017 Kabul hospital attack
- 2017 Camp Shaheen attack
- May 2017 Kabul bombing
- June 2017 Herat mosque bombing
- June 2017 Lashkargah bombing
- August 2017 Herat mosque attack
- 17 October 2017 Afghanistan attacks
- 20 October 2017 Afghanistan attacks
- 28 December 2017 Kabul suicide bombing

=== Battles ===
- Battle of Darzab (2017)
- Battle of Tora Bora (2017)

== 2018 operations ==
=== insurgent attacks ===
- 2018 Inter-Continental Hotel Kabul attack
- Save the Children Jalalabad attack
- Kabul ambulance bombing

== 2019 operations ==
=== insurgent attacks ===
Maidan Shar Attack

== 2020 operations ==
=== insurgent attacks ===
- 6 March 2020 Kabul shooting

== 2021 operations ==
=== Coalition opearations ===
- Operation Allies Refuge
- Operation Devi Shakti

=== Battles ===
- Battle of Kandahar (2021)

== List of battles and operations ==
The following table lists known military operations of the war in Afghanistan (2001–2021).

| Operation name | From date | To date | Location | Purpose/result |
|---|---|---|---|---|
| Battle of Alasay | 14 March 2009 | 23 March 2009 | Alasay | Battle: A coalition victory enabled the construction of two bases for the Afghan National Army in the valley near the village, which had been guerrilla control since 2006 |
| Battle of Chora | 15 June 2007 | 19 June 2007 | Chora | Battle: This battle, which involved a significant number of Dutch forces, resulted in the deaths of more than 100 people |
| Battle of Dahaneh | 12 August 2009 | 15 August 2009 | Dahaneh in the Helmand Province | |
| Battle of Firebase Anaconda | 8 August 2007 | 8 August 2007 | Uruzgan province | Battle: A group of roughly 75 Taliban militants mounted a frontal assault on a United States-led coalition base |
| Battle of Garmsir | April 2008 | 8 September 2008 | Garmsir in the Helmand Province | Counterinsurgency: A Major US Marine offensive on the Taliban-held town killing more than 400 insurgents. Taliban forces withdrew from the town as a result of the assault and took up a position further south |
| Battle of Musa Qala | 7 December 2007 | 12 December 2007 | Musa Qala | Battle: A British-led operation involving the Afghan National Army that resulted in a coalition victory and a Taliban retreat into the nearby mountains |
| Battle of Nawzad | 2006 | 2014 | Nawzad District in the Northern Helmand Province | |
| Battle of Panjwaii | July 2006 | October 2006 | Panjwayi District | Battle: Decisive Canadian victory, Panjwayi cleared of Taliban |
| Battle of Qala-i-Jangi | 25 November 2001 | 1 December 2001 | Qala-i-Jangi District | Battle: It began with the uprising of Taliban prisoners held at Qala-i-Jangi fortress and escalated into one of the bloodiest engagements of the war in Afghanistan |
| Battle of Takur Ghar | 4 March 2002 | 5 March 2002 | The peak of Takur Ghar | Battle: A helicopter caring a SEAL team went down and began receiving fire from hostile forces |
| Battle of Tora Bora | 6 December 2001 | 17 December 2001 | Pachir Wa Agam District, Nangarhar province | Battle: Attempt and failure to kill or capture Osama bin Laden |
| Operation Accius | 28 November 2002 | 1 June 2004 | Throughout Afghanistan | Contingency: The Canadian military's contribution to the civilian-led United Nations Assistance Mission in Afghanistan (UNAMA) |
| Operation Achilles | 6 March 2007 | 30 May 2007 | The Sangin and Kajaki districts of Helmand | Counterinsurgency: An attempt to stabilize the security situation in the province |
| Operation Allies Refuge | 14 July 2021 | 30 August 2021 | Throughout Afghanistan | Evacuation: To evacuate US nationals, embassy staff, and allied Afghan nationals from the country during and after the 2021 Taliban offensive |
| Operation Anaconda | 1 March 2002 | 18 March 2002 | Shah-i-Kot Valley and Paktika Province | Counterinsurgency: Attempt to destroy al-Qaeda and Taliban forces |
| Operation Apollo | October 2001 | October 2003 | Throughout Afghanistan | Contingency: The codename for an operation conducted by Canadian Forces in support of the United States in its military operations in Afghanistan |
| Operation Archer | July 2005 | 31 August 2006 | Throughout Afghanistan | Contingency: The Canadian Forces contribution to Operation Enduring Freedom in Afghanistan |
| Operation Argus | September 2005 | October 2008 | Throughout Afghanistan | Contingency and Security: Canadian Forces team of strategic military planners to support the government of the Islamic Republic of Afghanistan |
| Operation Asbury Park | 2 June 2004 | 17 June 2004 | Oruzgan Province and Zabul Province | Counterinsurgency: Was characterized by atypical fighting on the side of the tactics of the Taliban and other guerrillas encountered |
| Operation Asbury Park II | 2004 | 2004 | The Dey Chopan District | Counterinsurgency: Army infantrymen, Afghan National Army troops, and attached Marines again sparred with ACM forces in the region, inflicting significant losses against the enemy |
| Operation Athena | 17 July 2003 | December 2011 | Kabul and Kandahar | Security: The Canadian Forces contribution to the International Security Assistance Force in Afghanistan |
| Operation Avalanche | December 2003 | December 2003 | Southeast Afghanistan | Counterinsurgency: To search out al-Qaeda members while conducting assessments to establish conditions for the provision of humanitarian aid |
| Operation Baawar (Assurance) | 5 December 2010 | | The Horn of Panjwayi in Kandahar Province | To take a Taliban stronghold and build roads in the district |
| Operation Bulldog Bite | 12 November 2010 | 25 November 2010 | Kunar Province | Counterinsurgency: Destroyed two Taliban camps in the Watapur District |
| Operation Buzzard | 29 May 2002 | 9 July 2002 | Khowst region | Counterinsurgency: Forced al-Qaeda and the Taliban to abandon a large-scale presence in much of the region |
| Operation Celtics | May 2005 | May 2005 | | Counterinsurgency and Humanitarian: To hunt down enemy fighters and provide humanitarian support |
| Operation Cobra's Anger | 4 December 2009 | 12 December 2009 | A valley in the Nawzad District | |
| Operation Condor | 17 May 2002 | 22 May 2002 | The mountains of Paktia province | Counterinsurgency: British forces engaged in combat with al-Qaeda and Taliban forces |
| Operation Counterstrike | 5 January 2006 | 5 January 2006 | Kandahar Airfield | |
| Operation Crescent Wind | 7 October 2001 | December 2001 | Throughout Afghanistan | The codename for an American and British bombing campaign |
| Operation Devi Shakti | 16 August 2021 | 21 August 2021 | Throughout Afghanistan | Evacuation: An operation of the Indian Armed Forces to evacuate Indian citizens and foreign nationals from the country after the fall of Kabul |
| Operation Diablo Dragnet | 19 July 2007 | 19 July 2007 | Kandahar Airfield | |
| Operation Diablo Reach Back | 7 June 2005 | 27 June 2005 | Kandahar Province | Combined Task Force Bayonet forces engaged Taliban forces |
| Operation Diesel | 6 February 2009 | 7 February 2009 | Sangin, Helmand Province | A raid by British troops on a Taliban drug factory and arms stronghold |
| Operation Dragon Strike | September 15, 2010 | December 31, 2010 | Kandahar Province | Counterinsurgency: To reclaim the province from the Taliban |
| Operation Dragon Tree | August 2004 | August 2004 | Kandahar | Counterinsurgency: Searched for weapons caches |
| Operation Eagle's Summit (Oqab Tsuka) | August 2008 | 5 September 2008 | Kandahar and Helmand Provinces | With the objective of transporting a 220-tonne turbine to the Kajaki Dam in Helmand Province through Taliban-controlled territory. Cited by the Permanent Mission of Afghanistan to the United Nations as one of the largest logistical operations carried out by the British Army since World War II |
| Operation Falcon Summit | 15 December 2006 | January 2007 | The Panjwayi and Zhari districts of Kandahar | Counterinsurgency: Had the intention of expelling Taliban fighters |
| Operation Flashman | 16 July 2004 | 16 July 2004 | Paktika Province | Humanitarian and Security: To bring stability to the area and establish voter registration sites |
| Operation Hamkari | 2010 | | | |
| Operation Hammer (Chakush) | 24 July 2007 | 27 July 2007 | The Upper Grishk Valley in Helmand province | |
| Operation Harekate Yolo (Front Straightening) | 1 October 2007 | 8 November 2007 | Northwest Afghanistan | Counterinsurgency: Targeted hostile forces in the northern provinces |
| Operation Haven Denial | 2 July 2003 | 6 July 2003 | The Paktika and Khost provinces | Counterinsurgency: Targeted against Taliban remnants and al-Qaeda fighters |
| Operation Headstrong | 2 January 2004 | 2004 | Kabul | Law enforcement: Involved the training of Afghan commandos by British special forces to seek out and destroy drug laboratories and to confiscate drug shipments |
| Operation Herrick | 20 June 2002 | 12 December 2014 | Throughout Afghanistan | Contingency: The codename for all British combat operations in Afghanistan from 2002 until 2014 |
| Operation Highroad | 1 January 2015 | 18 June 2021 | | The second phase of the Australian Defence Force's operation in Afghanistan |
| Operation Hoover | 24 May 2007 | 25 May 2007 | Kandahar Province district of Zhari | Counterinsurgency: Was a Canadian-led offensive against the Taliban |
| Operation Jacana | 16 April 2002 | 9 July 2002 | Khost province, Paktia Province | With the aim of capturing or killing al-Qaeda and Taliban remnants |
| Operation Jaws | January 2012 | August 2012 | Helmand province | |
| Operation Karez | 13 May 2008 | 23 May 2008 | Badghis Province | Counterinsurgency: To eliminate Taliban presence in the region after insurgents regrouped following Operation Harekate Yolo |
| Operation Khanjar (Strike of the Sword) | 2 July 2009 | 20 August 2009 | Helmand Province | Counterinsurgency: A major US Marine offensive to secure the province |
| Operation Lastay Kulang (Pickaxe Handle) | 30 May 2007 | 14 June 2007 | Helmand province | A British-led NATO operation |
| Operation Lightning Resolve | 2004 | 2007 | Throughout Afghanistan | Security: Provide security in support of the first democratic elections ever in Afghanistan |
| Operation Lions Pride | 21 April 2006 | 21 April 2006 | Korangal Valley | Humanitarian: To provide medical assistance to more than 3,100 Afghans |
| Operation Mavericks | 2004 | 2005 | The mountains of Eastern Afghanistan | Counterinsurgency: Detained suspected terrorists and confiscating several weapons and explosives caches |
| Operation Medusa | 2 September 2006 | 17 September 2006 | Kandahar Province | Counterinsurgency: A Canadian-led offensive by major elements of the International Security Assistance Force and Afghan National Army |
| Operation Miracle | 24 August 2021 | 27 August 2021 | Throughout Afghanistan | Evacuation: An operation of the Republic of Korea Armed Forces to evacuate Afghan nationals from the country after the fall of Kabul |
| Operation Moshtarak (Together, Joint) | 13 February 2010 | 7 December 2010 | Marjah in the Helmand Province "poppy-growing belt" | Counterinsurgency: The largest military offensive ever launched by NATO troops in Afghanistan to clear the city of Taliban militants and drug traffickers eliminating the last Taliban stronghold in Helmand. It involved US Marine units and Afghan troops along with the US Special Forces and other ISAF members |
| Operation Mountain Blizzard | January 2004 | 12 March 2004 | The south, southeast, and eastern portions of Afghanistan | Counterinsurgency: Killed 22 enemy combatants and discovered caches with 3,648 rockets, 3,202 mortar rounds, 2,944 rocket-propelled grenades, 3,000 rifle rounds, 2,232 mines and tens of thousands of rounds of small-arms ammunition |
| Operation Mountain Fury | 16 September 2006 | 15 January 2007 | Paktika, Khost, Ghazni, Paktia, and Logar Provinces | Counterinsurgency: A NATO-led operation as a follow-up operation to Operation Medusa, to clear Taliban rebels from the eastern provinces of Afghanistan |
| Operation Mountain Lion | 11 April 2006 | 2006 | Near the Pakistan border | Counterinsurgency: Searching along the border with Pakistan for al-Qaeda and former Taliban forces |
| Operation Mountain Reach II | May 2010 | May 2010 | Kunar Province | US Army, Theatre Assets, ANSF, ANP, ANA were ambushed by 150+ Taliban for 8.5 hours along the route from Marawara District Center to Daridam Village area. 60-80 Taliban killed; three US soldiers wounded |
| Operation Mountain Resolve | 7 November 2003 | 2003 | Nuristan and Kunar Provinces | Counterinsurgency: The operation involved an airdrop into the Hindu Kush Mountains by the US 10th Mountain Division and resulted in the killing of Hezbi commander Ghulam Sakhee |
| Operation Mountain Storm | 5 March 2004 | July 2004 | The south, southeast, and eastern portions of Afghanistan | With the aim of cornering al-Qaeda and Taliban remnants |
| Operation Mountain Sweep | 18 August 2002 | 28 August 2002 | Mainly around Dormat and Narizah, south of Khowst and Gardez | Was designed to search out al-Qaeda and Taliban forces and information about the terrorist organizations |
| Operation Mountain Thrust | 15 May 2006 | 31 July 2006 | Kandahar, Helmand, Paktika, Zabul and Uruzgan Provinces | A major offensive, the primary objective of which was to quell the Taliban insurgency in southern Afghanistan |
| Operation Mountain Viper | 30 August 2003 | September 2003 | The mountains of the Dey Chopan District, Zabul province | Sought to uncover Taliban rebels. Deaths included 124 militants, five Afghan Army personnel and one US soldier |
| Operation Neptune | 9 August 2005 | 2005 | Nawa District | |
| Operation New Dawn | 12 June 2010 | | Helmand Province | An extension of Operation Moshtarak, a joint ISAF / ANA operation, led by the United States Marines, to disrupt insurgents and deny them freedom of movement in areas between Marjah and Nawa |
| Operation Northern Wind | | | | |
| Operation Oracle | | | | |
| Operation Oqab (Eagle) | 18 July 2009 | 28 July 2009 | Kunduz Province | To force the Taliban out of the province |
| Operation Palk Mesher | August 2007 | August 2007 | Helmand Province | To disrupt and eliminate insurgents |
| Operation Panther's Claw (Panchai Palang) | 19 June 2009 | 20 August 2009 | Helmand Province | 350 British Troops attacked a Taliban Stronghold near Babaji |
| Operation Pil | 16 October 2005 | 23 October 2005 | The Watapor Valley of the Kunar Province | To improve security and assist in stabilizing the government in the region |
| Operation Pitting | 13 August 2021 | 28 August 2021 | Throughout Afghanistan | Evacuation: To evacuate British nationals, embassy staff, and allied Afghan nationals from the country during and after the 2021 Taliban offensive |
| Operation Pizmah | 2005 | 15 December 2005 | Zabul Province | To reestablish a coalition presence in the districts of Dey Chopan, Argandab and Khaki-Afghan |
| Operation Ptarmigan | 15 April 2002 | | Gardez and Khost regions | The name given to the British share of military actions with US and coalition forces |
| Operation Red Wings | 27 June 2005 | July 2005 | Kunar Province | Counterterrorism mission |
| Operation Rhino | 19 October 2001 | 20 October 2001 | Kandahar | US troops seized an airstrip from the Taliban that would eventually become Camp Rhino |
| Operation Shahi Tandar | 7 January 2009 | 31 January 2009 | Kandahar Province | A series of raids and operations against Taliban insurgents |
| Operation Silicon | 30 April 2007 | | Upper Helmand Province | A sub-operation of Operation Achilles, carried out by NATO (mostly British) and Afghan troops. Recaptured Grishk from the Taliban |
| Operation Silver | 2007 | 2007 | | Counterinsurgency: Conducted to keep up the pressure on the Taliban in the hopes of blunting an expected spring offensive |
| Operation Sleigh Ride | December 2005 | December 2005 | Forward operating bases at Salerno, Ghazni, Orgun-E and Sharana | Christmas-time morale boost for troops |
| Operation Slipper | 22 October 2001 | 31 December 2014 | | The first phase of the Australian Defence Force's operation in Afghanistan |
| Operation Snipe | 2 May 2002 | 13 May 2002 | The remote Afghan mountains | A British Royal Marine search and clear operation over a significant area believed to be used as a base by al-Qaeda and Taliban forces |
| Operation Sond Chara (Red Dagger) | 11 December 2008 | 26 December 2008 | Taliban strongholds near the town of Nad-e-Ali in Helmand Province | To secure the area around the provincial capital of Lashkar Gah after an increase in insurgent attacks there, as well as to safeguard a planned voter registration program |
| Operation Sparviero | | | | Codename for the Italian Army's contributions to the ISAF |
| Operation Toral | 1 January 2015 | 8 July 2021 | Throughout Afghanistan | Contingency: The codename for all British combat operations in Afghanistan from 2015 until the end of the war in 2021 |
| Operation Torii | | | | |
| Operation Tor Shezada | 30 July 2010 | 2014 | | The operation was planned and executed by the International Security Assistance Force forces and Afghan army whose mission was to clear insurgents from Seyyedabad to the south of Nad-e Ali in Helmand province, in parallel to similar operations by the U.S. Marine Corps in Northern Marjah. Enabled by the UK Joint Aviation Group - UK Apache Attack Helicopters from 664 Squadron AAC alongside UK Chinook and Merlin heavy lift aircraft and USMC CH-53s, Osprey V-22s, Cobra Attack Helicopters and numerous other international Fixed Wing air assets. |
| Operation Veritas | 7 October 2001 | 2002 | Throughout Afghanistan | Contingency: The codename for all British combat operations in Afghanistan from the start of the war in 2001 until 2002 |
| Operation Vigilance | 15 April 2005 | April 2005 | Wardak Province | Counterinsurgency and Humanitarian: Targeted three individuals that coalition forces were trying to kill or capture, and included humanitarian aid drops in several villages |
| Operation Volcano | February 2007 | February 2007 | Near the Kajaki hydroelectric dam | Was a British operation to clear a Taliban base, consisting of 25 compounds. Was part of Operation Achilles |
| Operation Warrior Sweep | 20 July 2003 | September 2003 | The Zormat Valley, Paktia province | |
| Operation Wyconda Pincer | | 2006 | Districts of Bala Buluk and Pusht-i-Rod, in Farah province | Italian and Spanish Task-Force 45, killed 70 Taliban |
| Operation Solace | 23 August 2021 | 26 August 2021 | Districts of Kabul, in Kabul province | Noncombatant Evacuation Operation (NEO): Portuguese evacuate allied Afghan nationals from the country after the 2021 Taliban offensive |

== See also ==
- British Forces casualties in Afghanistan since 2001
- Canadian Forces casualties in Afghanistan
- Civilian casualties in the war in Afghanistan (2001–2021)
- Coalition casualties in Afghanistan
- Helmand Province campaign
- International Security Assistance Force
- Taliban insurgency
- U.S. government response to the September 11 attacks
- War in Afghanistan (2001–2021)
