= Headstrong =

Headstrong may refer to:

- Headstrong (band), a Canadian rap rock band
  - Headstrong (Headstrong album), the self-titled 2002 debut album by Headstrong
- Headstrong (Ashley Tisdale album), 2007, or the title track
- "Headstrong", a song by Earshot from the 2002 album Letting Go
- "Headstrong" (Trapt song), 2002
- Headstrong (play), a stage play by Patrick Link
- Operation Headstrong (2003–2004), involving the training of Afghan commandos by British special forces
- Headstrong, an alias used by electronic music producer Geert Huinink
- Headstrong (Transformers), a character in Transformers fiction
- "Headstrong", a song by 10,000 Maniacs from their 1989 album Blind Man's Zoo

== See also ==
- King Louis X of France (1289-1316), called the Headstrong
- Headstrong Club, an 18th-century English debating society
