= Khost suicide bombing =

Khost suicide bombing may refer to:

- 2008 Khost suicide bombing
- 2015 Khost suicide bombing
