= Operation Cobra's Anger =

U.S.-led 2009 military operation in southern Afghanistan

- Part of the War in Afghanistan (2001–2021)
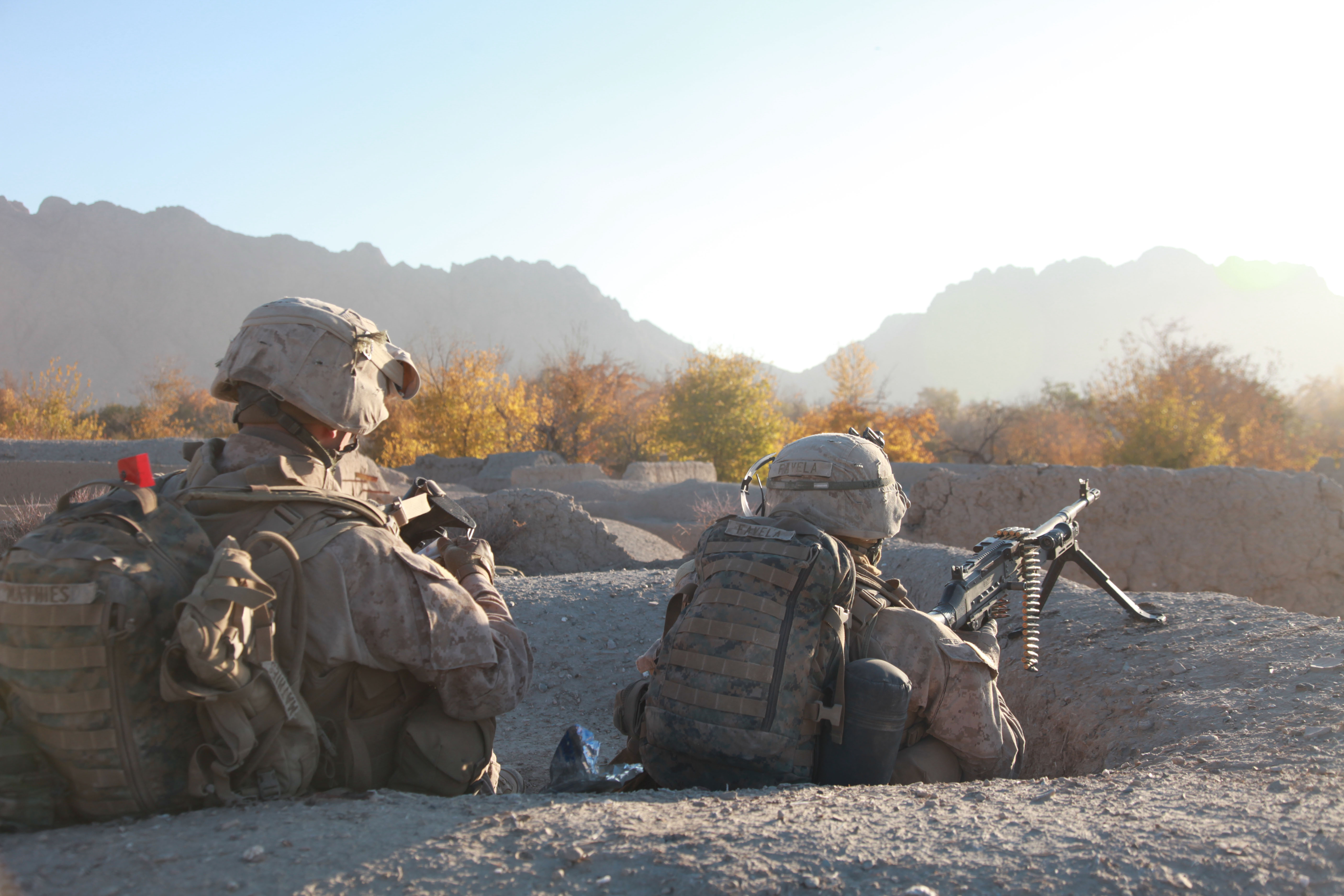
- U.S. Marines with Lima Company, 3rd Battalion, 4th Marine Regiment provide support by fire during Operation Cobra's Anger in Now Zad, Afghanistan, Dec. 5, 2009.
Date	4 December 2009 – December 12, 2009
Location	Nawzad District, Helmand Province, Afghanistan
Result	Coalition Victory

Belligerents
United States; Islamic Republic of Afghanistan; Denmark	(Afghanistan) Taliban; Al-Qaeda

Commanders and leaders
Lt. Col. Martin Wetterauer	

Strength
(United States) 1,000 (Afghanistan) 150	Unknown

Casualties and losses
4 killed	16 killed 5 captured

Operation Cobra's Anger was a US-led offensive in Helmand province in southern Afghanistan involving about 1,000 Marines and 150 Afghan troops, as well as a Danish armor attachment. The operation began in the early hours of December 4th, 2009 and ended December 12, 2009.

The goal of the operation was to disrupt Taliban supply and communications lines in the strategic Nawzad valley of Helmand province, and to reopen the strategic coalition supply lines, leading into FOB Cafferetta, a USMC/ANA outpost. The FOB was under siege by the Taliban and could only be accessed by air.

The offensive began three days after an announcement by then-president of the United States Barack Obama detailing a plan to increase the US presence in Afghanistan by another 30,000 troops.

== Operation ==
The operation began on 4 December 2009, when some 300 Marines from the 3rd Battalion, 4th Marines, and the Marine recon unit, Task Force Raider, dropped into the Now Zad valley via Sikorsky CH-53E Super Stallion helicopters and Bell Boeing V-22 Osprey aircraft. This was the first time the Osprey were used in combat operations in Afghanistan, as well as the newly implemented M1150 Assault Breacher Vehicle. There was a Danish armor attachment that took part in the operation as well. Throughout the recent years, the Taliban had planted thousands of homemade bombs, and dug in positions throughout the valley, in preparation for defense against coalition forces, that had been in this region since the early days of OEF. This area is located at the foot of the craggy Tangee Mountains.

By the end of the third day of the operation, no major resistance had been encountered.
