= 2014 Kunar Offensive =

Armed conflict of the War in Afghanistan

- Part of War in Afghanistan (2001–present)
- Map of Afghanistan with Kunar province highlighted
Date	December 2014
Location	Dangam district, Kunar province, eastern Afghanistan 35°0′0″N 71°12′0″E
Result	Afghanistan/Pakistan victory

Belligerents
Afghanistan: Afghan National Army; Supported by: Pakistan: Pakistan Armed Forces	Insurgent groups: Tehrik-i-Taliban Pakistan

Strength
	2,000 militants

Casualties and losses
5 soldiers killed (official sources); 6 civilians killed	21 killed, 33 wounded (official sources)

2014 Kunar Offensive refers to a 2014 armed conflict of the War in Afghanistan, between the Afghan Army and a terrorist group, Tehrik-i-Taliban Pakistan (TTP). It occurred in the Dangam district of eastern Kunar province, in Afghanistan bordering on Pakistan.

The offensive was launched by the Afghan Army on 22 December 2014 after Kunar province had been the site of armed clashes since 12 December 2014. It was a joint operation involving support from the Pakistan Army, aimed at destruction of TTP sanctuaries in Kunar province.

== Background ==
=== Peshawar school attack ===
On 16 December 2014, a group of seven members of the Tehrik-i-Taliban Pakistan (TTP), led by Abu Shamil who planned the attacks, accompanied by three Arabs and two Afghans who spoke Pashto and were from Eastern Afghanistan, conducted a terrorist attack on the Army Public School in the Pakistani city of Peshawar. They entered the school and opened fire on school staff and children, killing 145 people, including 132 schoolchildren, ranging between eight and eighteen years of age. TTP leaders operating in Afghanistan coordinated the attacks. A rescue operation was launched by the Pakistan Army's Special Services Group (SSG) special forces, who killed all seven terrorists and rescued 960 people.

=== Pakistani pressure ===
Pakistani Taliban were hiding in distant areas of Kunar and Nuristan provinces of Afghanistan. On 17 December, Pakistan's Chief of Army Staff General Raheel Sharif, accompanied by the Director General of the Inter-Service Intelligence, Lieutenant-General Rizwan Akhtar, went on a visit to Kabul to meet with Afghan President Ashraf Ghani and General John F. Campbell, the commander of American and NATO forces in Afghanistan. According to the news sources in Pakistan, General Raheel asked for the handovers of TTP leadership and asked the Afghan government to act against hideouts of the Taliban terrorists in its territory.

At the meeting with Afghan officials, General Raheel delivered a message to Afghan National Army's Chief of Staff, Lieutenant General Sher Mohammad Karimi, "to take decisive action against sanctuaries of the TTP or else Pakistan would go for a hot pursuit." One intelligence official confirmed the message relayed to Afghan president and reportedly cautioned that "if Afghan authorities fail to act this time, we will explore all options, including hot pursuit." In further talks, General Raheel told the Afghan president that "Pakistan's military could eliminate TTP's sanctuaries in Kunar and Nuristan on its own but was showing restraint due to Afghanistan's sovereignty and territorial integrity. President Ashraf Ghani assured General Raheel that his country would take all the necessary steps to root out the terrorists. A joint operation against the Taliban was also discussed with the Afghan leadership. In a media report published in The Nation, Prime Minister Nawaz Sharif released a separate statement to Afghan president on a "hot pursuit" and has sent a message to Kabul reportedly stressing: "Wipe out Taliban or we will."

Earlier in June 2014, it was reported by Afghan officials that the Pakistan Armed Forces had started an offensive in Kunar province, an allegation denied by Pakistani foreign office. Pakistani officials said that Afghan army was committing border violations and was involved in cross-border attacks.

On 24 December 2014, Afghan Army chief General Sher Mohammad Karimi and ISAF Commander General John Campbell while on a visit to Pakistan Army's GHQ in Rawalpindi, achieved consensus to continue coordinated operations and eliminate the TTP sanctuaries in Afghanistan. A Pakistani military official said, "It (Kunar) was a coordinated operation. The Afghan side shared information with us and we took measures on our side." An ISPR statement added: "Both leaders assured their full support in fight against terrorism and eliminating terrorists on Afghan soil." Insurgents from Pakistan and Afghanistan attacked Afghan army posts in Dangam district of Kunar province. As many as 2,000 militants were reported to be involved in the conflict.

=== Fazlullah's presence ===
In November 2009, Fazlullah told the BBC's Urdu Service that he had escaped from Pakistan to Afghanistan and warned that he would continue to attack Pakistani forces in Swat. After the death of Hakimullah Mehsud in a drone attack, Fazlullah was appointed as the new "Amir" (Chief) of the Tehrik-e-Taliban Pakistan on 7 November 2013. He narrowly escaped a U.S. drone strike on 25 November 2014. After reports that Fazlullah masterminded the Peshawar school attack, Pakistan Army officials were pressured to kill him within 24 hours. On the other hand, Pakistani officials in turn have asked Afghan authorities to capture and hand over Fazlullah multiple times.

== See also ==
- Operation Zarb-e-Azb
- Military operations of the War in Afghanistan (2001–2021)
