= Nawzad, Afghanistan =

Town in Helmand Province, Afghanistan

Nawzad
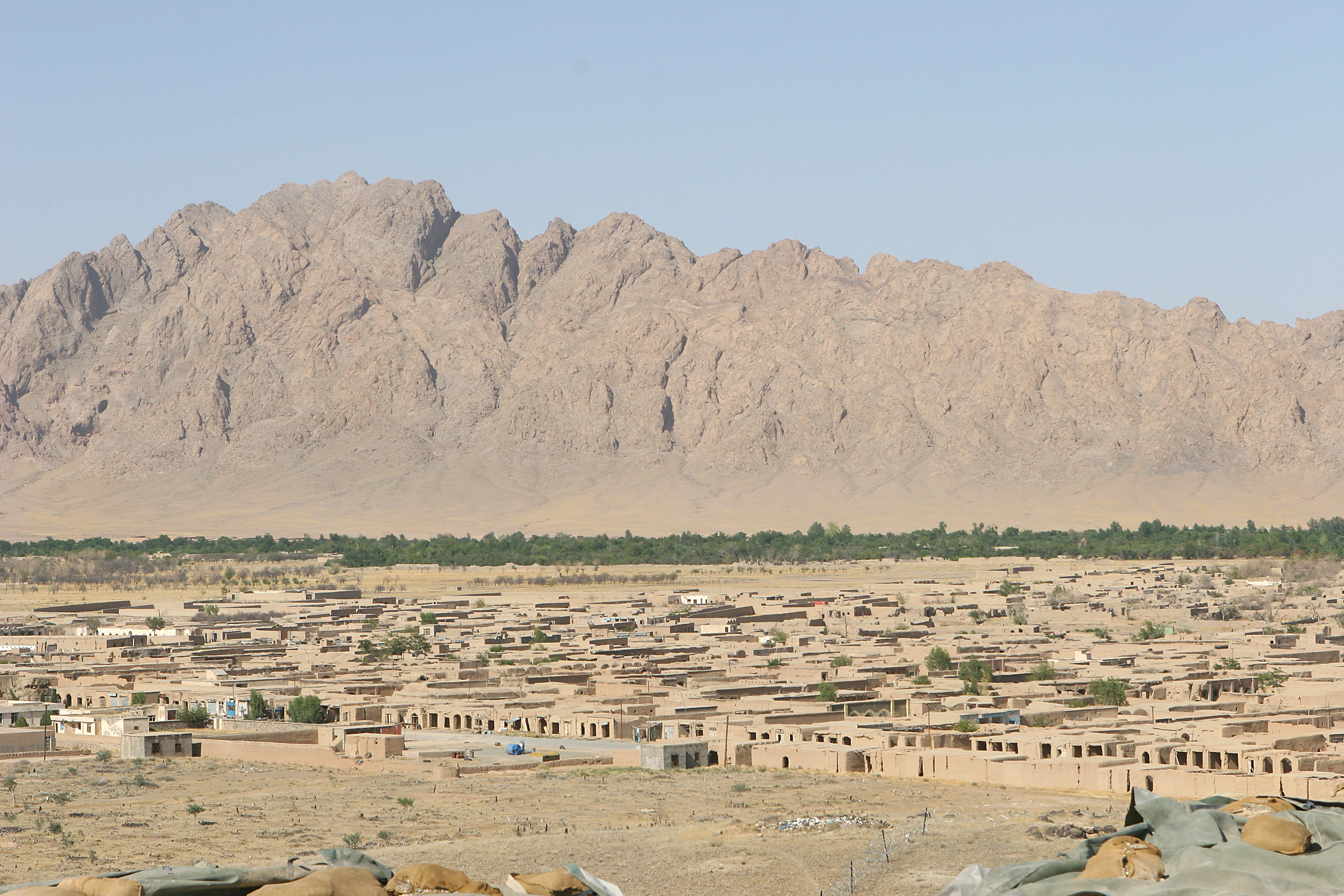
- Nawzad in June 2009

- Location in Afghanistan
- Coordinates: 32°24′N 64°28′E
- Country: Afghanistan
- Province: Helmand Province
- District: Nawzad District
- Elevation: 4,006 ft (1,221 m)
- Time zone: UTC+4:30

Nawzad (Pashto: نوزاد; also Now Zad) is a small town, the centre of Nawzad District in Helmand Province, Afghanistan. It is located at 32.4000°N 64.4667°E at an altitude of 1221 metres ASL. It was the site of the Battle of Nawzad.

Surrounded to the southwest and east by mountains, the town consists of a bazaar, one road, and a maze of mud-brick houses and compounds, interspersed with narrow alleys. The local economy traditionally revolves around opium poppy farming. Like much of Afghanistan, Nawzad and the surrounding area were largely peaceful after the 2001 invasion.

The animal rescue charity Nowzad Dogs, founded by Pen Farthing, is named after the town.

== Climate ==
With an influence from the local steppe climate, Nawzad features a cold semi-arid climate (BSk) under the Köppen climate classification. The average temperature in Nawzad is 16.0 °C, while the annual precipitation averages 162 mm.

July is the warmest month of the year with an average temperature of 28.8 °C. The coldest month January has an average temperature of 2.9 °C.

Climate data for Musa Qala
Month	Jan	Feb	Mar	Apr	May	Jun	Jul	Aug	Sep	Oct	Nov	Dec	Year
Mean daily maximum °C (°F)	9.5 (49.1)	11.9 (53.4)	18.6 (65.5)	24.9 (76.8)	31.0 (87.8)	36.6 (97.9)	38.1 (100.6)	36.6 (97.9)	32.0 (89.6)	25.8 (78.4)	18.1 (64.6)	12.2 (54.0)	24.6 (76.3)
Daily mean °C (°F)	2.9 (37.2)	5.4 (41.7)	11.4 (52.5)	17.0 (62.6)	22.2 (72.0)	26.9 (80.4)	28.8 (83.8)	26.7 (80.1)	21.5 (70.7)	15.7 (60.3)	9.1 (48.4)	4.6 (40.3)	16.0 (60.8)
Mean daily minimum °C (°F)	−3.4 (25.9)	−1.0 (30.2)	4.3 (39.7)	9.2 (48.6)	13.4 (56.1)	17.2 (63.0)	19.5 (67.1)	16.9 (62.4)	11.0 (51.8)	5.7 (42.3)	0.2 (32.4)	−3.0 (26.6)	7.5 (45.5)
Source: Climate-Data.org

== Conflict ==
During the early post-Taliban years, the town thrived, helped by irrigation from the Helmand and Arghandab Valley Authority. People came for miles to its bazaar; the United Nations even began building a school. But by early 2007, the estimated 10,000 civilian population, including Nawzad's police force, had fled, driven out by violence from returning Taliban insurgents.

In the years following, Nawzad became a ghost town and British, Gurkha, and Estonian forces only managed to maintain a stalemate in the region. Now Zad became one of the most bitterly contested districts since British forces first moved into Helmand in 2006.

In December 2007 a small force of a British Army OMLT (Operational Mentoring and Liaison Team) with 7 soldiers drawn from 26 Regiment, Royal Artillery & 151 (London) Transport Regiment, Royal Logistic Corps who were mentoring a company of approximately 70 ANA soldiers supported by 14 soldiers from US Special Forces Task Force 232 deployed from Camp Shorabak. The task was to provide a diversion for the upcoming Operation Mar Karadad (the re-taking of Musa Qualeh). This was done by mounting a deliberate attack on Nipple Compound, a Taliban compound to the south of Now Zad.

In 2008, U.S. Marines arrived to replace the British and Estonian contingents. However, as of June 2009, the Marines seemed to have come to a similar standstill with the Taliban insurgents. Much of this battle is highlighted in the book 15 Years of War.

In December 2009, U.S. Marines launched a new assault with 1,000 troops and several 70-ton assault breacher vehicles. They reported to have pressed into a remote Taliban stronghold during the joint American-British Operation "Cobra's Anger". In 2016 Nawzad was under Taliban control.

== See also ==
- Battle of Now Zad
- Battle of Musa Qala
- Siege of Sangin
- Helmand Province campaign – ongoing ISAF campaign in Helmand Province, Afghanistan
- Helmand Province
