= Operation Hoover =

2007 military operation

- Part of Operation Falcon Summit, War in Afghanistan (2001–2021)
Date	May 24–25, 2007
Location	Zhari District, Kandahar Province, Afghanistan
Result	Coalition victory

Belligerents
Coalition: Canada; Islamic Republic of Afghanistan; Portugal; United Kingdom	(Afghanistan) Taliban

Commanders and leaders
(Canada) Battle group commander Lt.Col. Rob Walker; (Canada) OC "I" Company Maj. David Quick; (Canada) OC "H" Company Maj. Alex Ruff; (Canada) OC OMLT Maj. James Price	(Afghanistan) Local Taliban commanders

Strength
1,000 total; 900 Regular troops; 100 Portuguese Army Commandos	Up to 300 insurgents

Casualties and losses
(Canada) 1 killed (Canada) 2 wounded (Afghanistan) 1 wounded	60–100 killed

Operation Hoover was a 2007 Canadian-led offensive in the War in Afghanistan against the Taliban in the Kandahar Province district of Zhari. The aims of the operation were to root out as many as 300 suspected Afghan insurgents who had moved into the villages of the Zhari District. Operation Hoover was initially an H Company/A Squadron Combat Team operation, but grew to a 2nd Battalion Royal Canadian Regiment Battle Group operation for the final phase in Nalgham, Zhari. Operation Hoover was part of the overarching Operation Baaz Tsuka.

== Battle ==
During the first morning of the operation, Leopard tanks from Lord Strathcona's Horse entered Zhari, accompanied with pickup trucks filled with Afghan National Army troops. One of the tanks was hit by an improvised explosive device, but no casualties were reported.

At dawn the Portuguese Commandos secured a few compounds to the east. One platoon to the north came in contact with insurgents. The contact lasted for more than an hour but at the end the commandos, supported by Portuguese special forces snipers, manage to get to their objective. One Portuguese soldier was air medevac'd, and an undetermined number of insurgents lay on the ground.

Shortly afterwards, Corporal Matthew McCully, a signals operator with the 2 Canadian Mechanized Brigade Group, was killed when he stepped on a landmine. Another Canadian, as well as an Afghan translator, were also wounded in the incident which occurred outside Nalgham village.

Master Corporal Rob McGregor, of the 2nd Battalion, The Royal Canadian Regiment, was injured in the operation when he fell and broke his ankle.

Throughout the day a number of close air support tasks were requested but none deployed any ordnance.
