= Operation Asbury Park =

Battle in Afghanistan in 2004, US v. Taliban

- Part of War in Afghanistan (2001–2021)
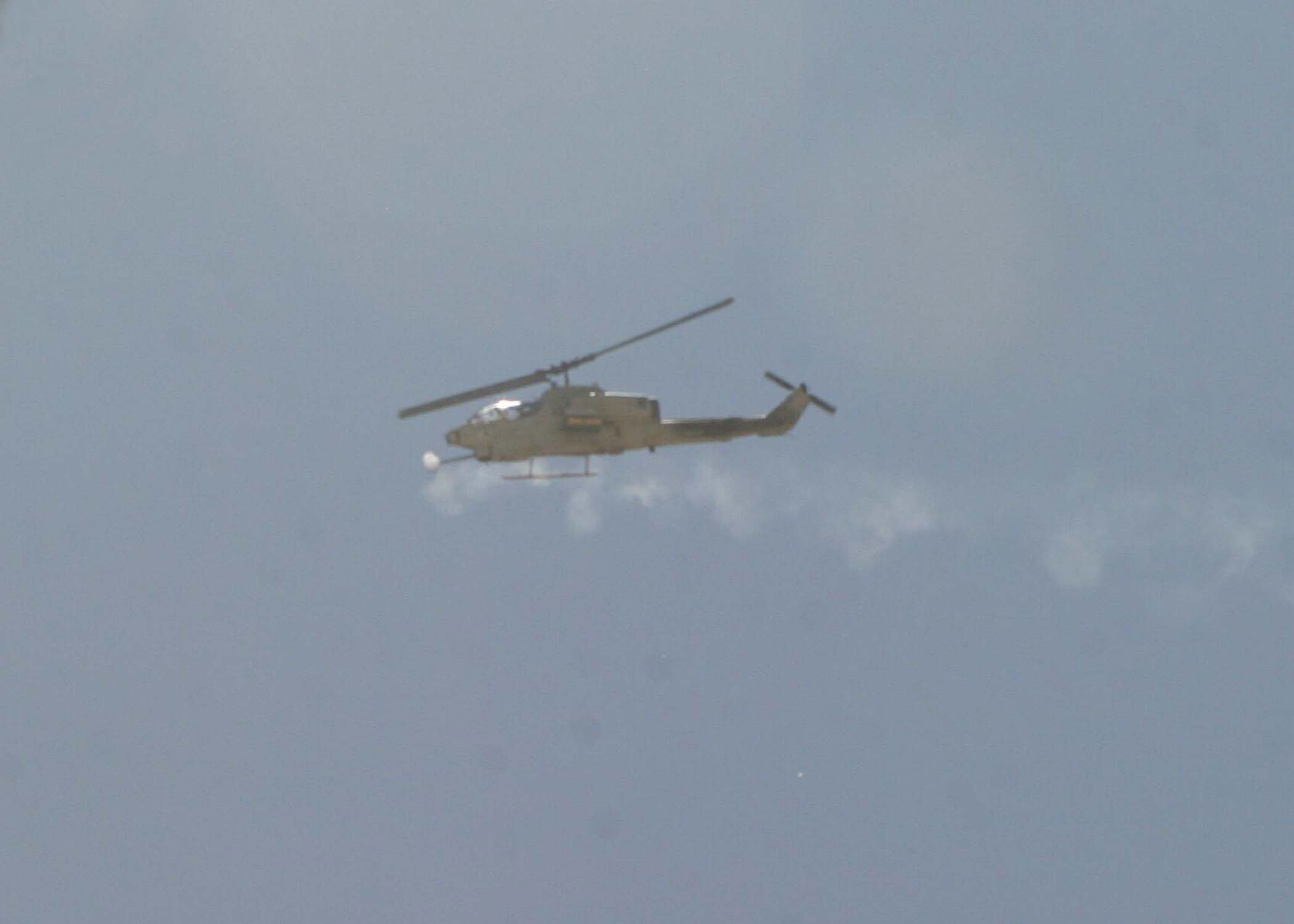
- An American AH-1 Cobra engaging the Taliban during Operation Asbury Park.
Date	June 2, 2004, and June 17, 2004
Location	Dai Chopan, Afghanistan
Status	American-Afghan victory

Belligerents
United States; Islamic Republic of Afghanistan: Afghan National Army; Various militia forces	(Afghanistan) Taliban

Casualties and losses
5 injured	Per ISAF Claims; 100 killed 200-300 wounded

Operation Asbury Park was a deployment, on June 2, 2004, and June 17, 2004, of Task Force 1st Battalion, 6th Marines Battalion Landing Team (1/6 BLT) of the 22nd Marine Expeditionary Unit engaged Taliban and other resisting militants in both Oruzgan Province and Zabul Province culminating in the Dai Chopan region of Afghanistan.

During Asbury Park, the Taliban and the other guerillas would frequently stand their ground, dig in and engage the Marine forces. This was instead of the more usual hit-and-run tactics. The U.S. Marines, with the aid of Rockwell B-1B Lancers, Fairchild Republic A-10 Thunderbolt IIs, and AH-64 Apache aircraft, engaged in "pitched battles each day," culminating in a large battle on June 8.

After the last of the fighting which took place near Dai Chopan on June 8, enemy forces were depleted to such an extent that no further contact was made for the duration of the operation. What was meant by the enemy to be a three pronged attack June 8, 2004 resulted in over eighty-five confirmed kills, with estimates well in excess of 100 enemy dead, an estimated 200-300 wounded, with dozens captured. While throughout the entire operation a "handful" of US forces and Afghan Militia were injured.

Asbury Park was followed by Operation Asbury Park II, which included Army personnel from the 25th Infantry Division, Afghan National Army troops, and attached Marines.
