= Operation Shahi Tandar =

Series of Coalition operations in the War in Afghanistan (2001–2021)

- Part of the War in Afghanistan (2001–2021)
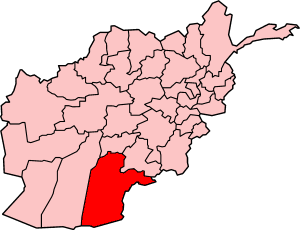
- Map of Afghanistan showing Kandahar province
Date	January 7, 2009 – January 31, 2009
Location	Kandahar Province, Afghanistan
Result	Coalition victory

Belligerents
Coalition: United Kingdom; Islamic Republic of Afghanistan; Canada	(Afghanistan) Taliban

Commanders and leaders
Charlie Stickland	Unknown

Strength
700–1,000	Unknown

Casualties and losses
2 killed	"Several hundred killed" (ISAF claim); 8 captured

Operation Shahi Tandar, also called Operation Atal, was a series of operations by Coalition troops from the British 42 Commando Royal Marines, Royal Canadian Regiment, Royal Canadian Dragoons, 2nd Battalion 2nd Infantry Regiment (United States), and the Afghan national military in central Helmand province and the Western Panjwayi and Western Zhari districts of Kandahar, Afghanistan from January 7–31, 2009.

One raid targeted a Taliban bomb-making factory in the Khakrez and Shah Wali Khot districts of Kandahar, Afghanistan, January 7–9, 2009. In the raid, conducted by helicopter and armored vehicles, the coalition troops seized six large tubs of explosives along with 38 pressure plates used to detonate hidden mines. Also seized were 3,000 rounds of ammunition, AK47s, anti-personnel mines and 22 rocket-propelled grenades.

The coalition troops reported that they captured eight Taliban bomb-makers and found 20 kg of opium with an estimated street value in Britain of £130,000. A Canadian soldier, Trooper Brian Good, 42, was killed by a booby trap during the operation. Lieutenant Colonel Charlie Strickland, commander of the 42 Commandos, stated that the operation had "dealt a serious blow" to the Taliban insurgency.

In another operation, approximately 700 troops from the Afghan National Army, and British, Danish, and Canadian forces cleared a Taliban stronghold near Spin Masjid, north of Lashkar Gar. In the 10-day battle, the coalition claimed to have killed or chased away "hundreds" of Taliban insurgents, killed several Taliban leaders, and disarmed 15 improvised explosive devices (IEDs). One British soldier, Corporal Danny Nield of 1st Battalion The Rifles, was killed by a rocket-propelled grenade (RPG), possibly fired by an Afghan National Army soldier. In addition to the Rifles, British forces included the 24 Commando Royal Engineers.
