= Operation Tsunami =

2003 operation against drug trafficking in Afghanistan

- Date: 2003
- Location: Afghanistan
- Type: Military; Law enforcement operation
- Target: Drug traffickers
- Participants: Canadian Forces, Afghan Police

Operation Tsunami was a joint operation in 2003 between 200 Canadian forces and Afghanistan police against drug trafficking in Afghanistan.

On January 18, 2003, Operation Tsunami forces arrested sixteen suspected drug traffickers.
