= Operation Condor (Afghanistan) =

2002 British-led military operation

Operation Condor was the name of a major British-led operation in southeastern Afghanistan. The operation began on 17 May 2002 when a patrol of the Australian Special Air Service was ambushed. The British 45 Commando then flew in to destroy the guerilla force that had exposed itself. It followed Operations Snipe, Torii and Anaconda.
