= 2011 Nimruz province bombing =

Taliban attack in Afghanistan

30 June 2011 Nimruz province bombing
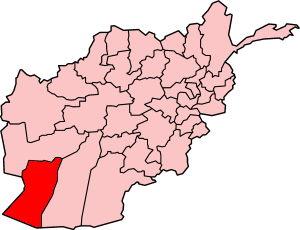
- Location: Nimroz Province
- Date: 30 June 2011 (GMT+4:30)
- Target: Civilian bus
- Attack type: Roadside bomb
- Deaths: 20
- Injuries: 30
- Perpetrator: Taliban

The 30 June 2011 Nimruz province bombing was a roadside bombing targeting a bus of civilians killing 20 and injuring more than 30 in Nimruz province, Afghanistan. The bus was traveling on a highway between Kandahar and Nimruz province frequently used by coalition forces when it was struck by a bomb. The Taliban did not claim responsibility for the bombing.
