= Operation Diesel =

British and Afghan action against Taliban in 2009

- Part of the War in Afghanistan (2001–2021)
Date	February 6–7, 2009
Location	Sangin, Afghanistan
Result	Coalition victory

Belligerents
United Kingdom; Islamic Republic of Afghanistan	(Afghanistan) Taliban

Commanders and leaders
(United Kingdom) Gordon Messenger (United Kingdom) Jim Morris	?

Strength
700–800	Unknown

Casualties and losses
None	20 confirmed killed

Operation Diesel was a raid by 700 British troops from the Royal Marines 45 Commando, 42 Commando, and the 3 Commando Brigade's Reconnaissance Force, as well as armoured infantry and close reconnaissance from 1st Battalion Princess of Wales's Royal Regiment (1 PWRR) on a Taliban drug factory and arms stronghold in the Upper Sangin Valley in Helmand province, Afghanistan on February 7, 2009. The raid captured four drug factories and heroin and opium worth £50 million.

In the early hours of February 7 the raid was launched. Within 20 minutes two waves of RAF Chinooks, Royal Navy Sea Kings, Lynx and American Sea Stallions delivered 500 troops from 45 Commando Royal Marines and both British and Afghan special forces into three landing zones half-a-mile from enemy positions. Large vats of opium were abandoned while still being boiled as the Taliban fled the assault. The Task Force Helmand commander, Brig Gordon Messenger called Operation Diesel a "clinical precision strike" that had "a powerful disruptive effect on known insurgent and narcotics networks in the area". Four drugs factories were captured along with gallons of chemicals used to process opium into heroin. Large numbers of machine guns were also recovered as well as a motor bike that had been primed as a suicide bomb.

Twenty Taliban fighters defending the drugs were killed. No UK personnel were killed in the assault.
