= Operation Oqab =

2009 Afghan military operation

- Part of the War in Afghanistan (2001–2021)
| Date | July 18, 2009 – July 28, 2009 |
| Location | Kunduz Province, Afghanistan |
| Result | Temporary forced displacement of the Taliban forces |

Belligerents
| Islamic Republic of Afghanistan; ISAF: Germany; France; United States; Belgium | (Afghanistan) Taliban Islamic Jihad Union |

Commanders and leaders
| (Afghanistan) General Ali Murat | Maulavi Abdul-Rahman; Abdul-Salam Baryalai; Shamsuddin Shamsullah; Bashir Haqqani; Mulla Abdul-Raziq; Qari Abdul-Wadoud; Inayatullah Zadran |

Strength
| (Afghanistan) 800 soldiers (Afghanistan) 100 police officers (Germany) 300 soldiers (United States) : U.S Air Force; Total: 1,200 | 300 insurgents |

Casualties and losses
| (Afghanistan) 26 killed 64 wounded | 20 killed (NATO claim); 2 wounded 2 captured |

Operation Oqab (Eagle in English, Adler in German) was a military operation conducted by ISAF and Afghan National Army troops, in July 2009, with the objective to force the Taliban out of Kunduz Province.

== Background ==
Since April 2009, the German forces in northern Afghanistan had been under pressure from the Taliban and the Islamic Jihad Union. The attack on the German forces after the visit of chancellor Angela Merkel on April 7, 2009, and the following months showed that the Taliban and their allies exerted heavy pressure to try to force the German troops out of Afghanistan, since involvement in the conflict has been controversial in Germany.

The ISAF and Afghan forces began an offensive to reinforce the control and security of Kunduz Province before the Afghan presidential election in August 2009, and reduce pressure on the German forces before the German federal election in September. A second focus was to free the routes into Afghanistan from Uzbekistan, since it was planned to change the supply routes for ISAF to a route from Uzbekistan.

The ISAF planned to change its focus to rebuilding, after the Taliban had left the province.

For the attack, 800 Afghan soldiers and 100 Afghan policemen were placed in the province. The Bundeswehr prepared its Quick Reaction Force (QRF), equipped with Marder infantry fighting vehicles, Fuchs and Dingo APCs, as well as mortars. The ground troops were supported by the United States Air Force (USAF) and its MQ-1 Predator and Fairchild A-10 close air support aircraft.

== The Operation ==
The first attack on Taliban positions started on the morning of July 19. German forces supported by Marder armoured vehicles and mortars attacked the Taliban.

The following day Camp Marmal was under attack by rockets, during a counter-attack by the USAF five Taliban were killed.

The Afghan forces reported that they had control of the province on July 23. On July 24 a German patrol came under fire, one vehicle was damaged.

On July 31, German troops captured Qari Abdul Wadoud, the leader of the Taliban in the Imam Sahib District.

On August 1 it was reported that Taliban forces reconquered the area in the Chahar Dara District of southern Kunduz.

== Aftermath ==
Operation Oqab was the first German ground force offensive since the creation of the Bundeswehr and the first German ground attack since World War II. The commander of the QRF, Hans-Christoph Grohmann, introduced one of his Officers as "the first Oberleutnant to lead an Infantry Company in to battle since 1945" to the press.
