= Operation Hammer (Afghanistan) =

2007 Coalition operation during the War in Afghanistan

- Part of the War in Afghanistan (2001–2021)
Date	July 24–27, 2007
Location	Helmand province, Afghanistan
Result	Coalition strategic victory (Coalition forces took control of territory south of the Helmand river.)

Belligerents
United Kingdom; Estonia; Denmark; United States; Islamic Republic of Afghanistan; International Security Assistance Force	(Afghanistan) Taliban

Strength
(United Kingdom) 1,500; 500 others	100

Casualties and losses
(United Kingdom) 3 killed	100+ killed

Operation Hammer was a British-led NATO operation in the southern Helmand province of Afghanistan. The Task Force level offensive, codenamed 'Chakush' or 'Hammer', began in the early hours of July 24, 2007 in the area between Hyderabad and Mirmandab, north-east of Gereshk. The operation continued the momentum towards expelling Taliban forces from areas of the Upper Gereshk Valley in Helmand province.

A total of 1,500 ISAF and 500 ANSF personnel took part in the operation. Most of the 1,500 NATO forces were British, mainly drawn from The Light Dragoons, The First Battalion No 2 Company Grenadier Guards – who were providing operational mentoring to Afghan National Army troops (from 2nd Kandak 3rd Brigade 205th Corps), the (12 Mechanized) Brigade Reconnaissance Force, 26 Regiment Royal Engineers, 19th Regiment Royal Artillery, the Theatre Supports Group who consisted of The 1st Battalion The Royal Welsh who provided tremendous support of fire with their FSG Group, No 3 (Fighting) Company Grenadier Guards (under the command of 1st Battalion The Royal Anglian Regiment (The Vikings)), the Joint Force EOD group as well as troops from Estonia, Denmark and the US. ISAF helicopters and aircraft provided support to ground troops.

During the initial stages of the operation, ISAF and Afghan National Security Forces advanced to secure a strategic bridge crossing over the Nahr-e-Seraj canal, clearing and searching compounds, before military engineers from 26 Engineer Regiment established a joint forward operating base.

By early November operations ended with Coalition troops establishing a firm frontline south of the Helmand river and were preparing for an attack towards Musa Qalah, which had been under Taliban control for eight months.
