= Operation Haven Denial =

2003 US-led military operation in Afghanistan

Operation Haven Denial was a U.S.-led operation (July 2–6, 2003) against Taliban remnants and Al Qaeda fighters in the Paktika and Khost provinces of Afghanistan. The operation involved 800 U.S soldiers backed by more than 500 Italian paratroopers and by 25 aircraft.

One illegal border checkpoint was dismantled and one small cache of weapons was confiscated. Some 250 vehicles were inspected and 400 people interviewed, but no one was detained during the operation.

It was the biggest operation in Afghanistan since Operation Anaconda in March 2002.
