= Operation Tor Shezada =

British military operation in Afghanistan

- Part of the War in Afghanistan (2001–2021)
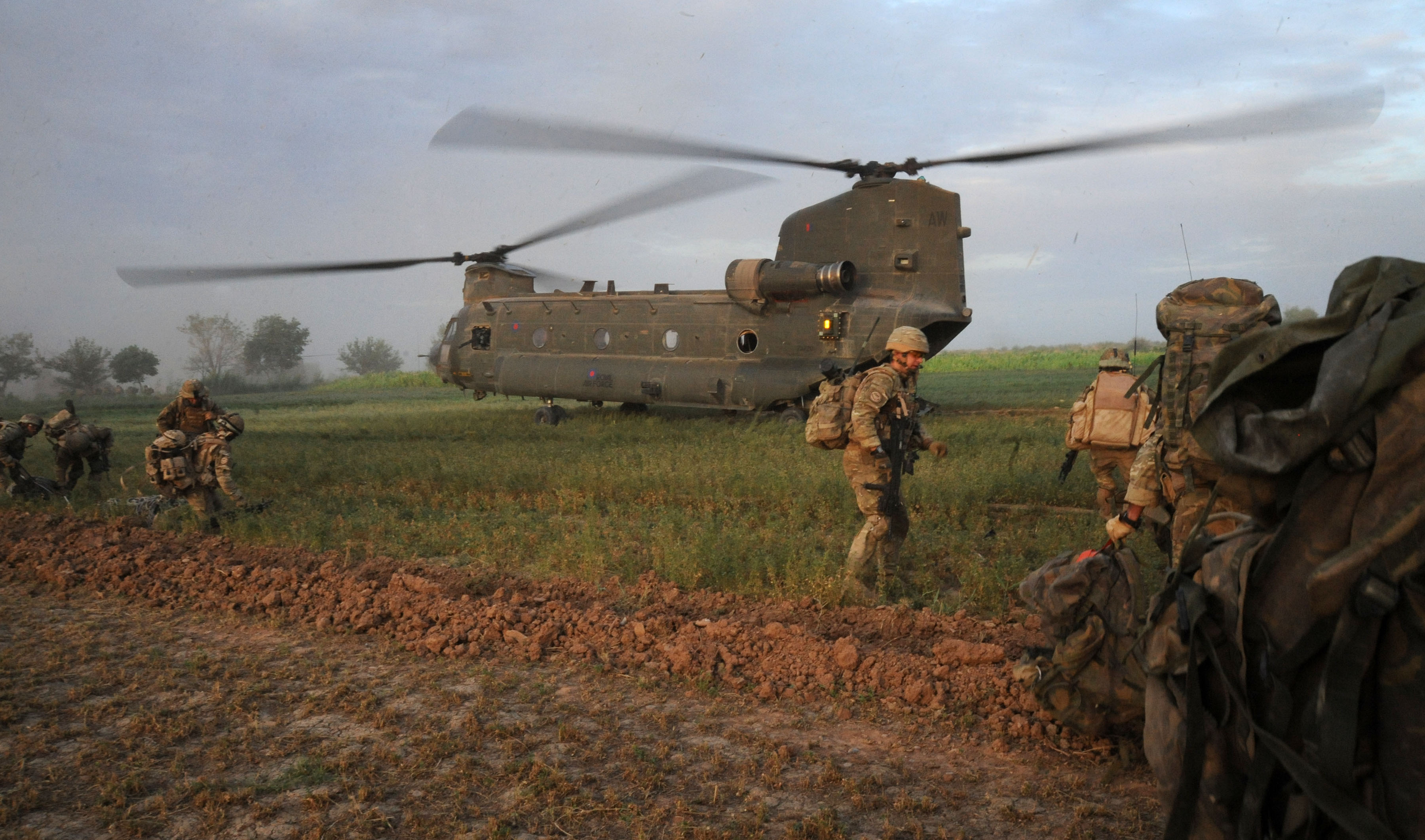
- British troops preparing to board a Chinook during the operation, 2010
Date	July 30, 2010 – 2014
Location	Sayedebad, Helmand Province in Afghanistan
Status	Afghan government/British victory

Belligerents
Islamic Republic of Afghanistan; United Kingdom	(Afghanistan) Taliban

Operation Tor Shezada (Arabic: عملية تور شيزادا), also known as Operation Black Prince (Arabic: عملية الأمير الأسود), was a joint military operation between the Taliban and forces from the United Kingdom. It was fought in Helmand Province in Afghanistan, as apart of the war in Afghanistan.

The operation was planned and executed by the International Security Assistance Force forces and Afghan army whose mission is to clear the Taliban from Seyyedabad to the south of Nad-e Ali in Helmand province, in parallel to similar operations by the U.S. Marine Corps in Northern Marjah. The operation officially began on July 30, 2010, with the Duke of Lancaster's Regiment leading.
