= Operation Bulldog Bite =

2010 joint U.S. and Afghan counter-insurgent mission

- Part of the War in Afghanistan (2001–2021)
Date	12 November 2010 - 25 November 2010
Location	Kunar province, Afghanistan
Result	American victory: Two Taliban camps destroyed.; Several weapons caches captured.

Belligerents
United States; Islamic Republic of Afghanistan	(Afghanistan) Taliban

Commanders and leaders
Maj. Gen. John Campbell and COL Joseph Ryan	Unknown

Units involved
1st Battalion, 327th Infantry Regiment, 101st Airborne Division; 6th Squadron, 6th US Cavalry Regiment; 1st Battalion, 75th Ranger Regiment; United States Air Force Pararescue; Alaska Air National Guard's 212th Rescue Squadron (Afghanistan) Afghan National Army	

Casualties and losses
(United States) 6 killed (United States) 30+ wounded (Afghanistan) 10 killed	52-150 killed (1 Taliban Regional Commander)

Operation Bulldog Bite was a joint US and Afghan counter-insurgent mission in Kunar province, Afghanistan, against Taliban forces that was conducted in November 2010. The operation targeted Taliban havens in the villages of the Watapur District, which lies in the eastern region of the Pech River Valley. The region served as a transit area for Taliban and al Qaeda fighters entering from Pakistan, and is just five miles from the Korangal Valley, an area where US forces had previously shut down combat operations. In 2009, US commanders stated that the valley was strategically insignificant due to its remote location, but the Taliban and al Qaeda would later use the region to launch attacks into neighboring Afghan provinces.

The operation involved several nighttime air assaults against remote mountain villages in the aim of penetrating deep into the Pech River Valley. The 1st Battalion, 327th Infantry Regiment, 101st Airborne Division along with 1st Battalion, 75th Ranger Regiment took part in the operation. The death of the first American soldier killed in combat occurred on November 12. Two days later, US troops encountered heavy resistance, and five soldiers from Alpha Company, 1st Battalion, 327th Infantry Regiment, 1st Brigade Combat Team, 101st Airborne Division were killed during a nine-hour-long firefight in the Watapur area. US Air Force Pararescue jumpers conducted operations to rescue the wounded and to collect those who were killed in action. Helicopters deployed from the 33rd Rescue Squadron took enemy fire as they hovered above the wounded. By the end of the second evening, ABU platoon and its ANA Augment force had received 80% casualties and BUKA platoon had received 60% casualties including wounded and ANA KIA. Kiowa Warriors from Task Force Shooters (C Troop 6-6) and AH-64D Apaches (B Co 1-10 ATK) provided close air support to the beleaguered ABU platoon who was surrounded, isolated and low on ammunition. Between multiple battle handovers the OH-58Ds engaged "Danger Close" with .50 caliber and 2.75" HE and WP rockets while Apache helicopters provided multiple AGM-114 Hellfire Missiles to the platoon in danger of being overrun. Later in the night, when the battle had ended an F-18 dropped a 2,000-pound bomb on INS withdrawing from the fight. After stout resistance was encountered in the first 72 hours of the operation and considering the casualties encountered by US forces, the ANA Commandos, advised by elements of 75th Ranger Regiment were deployed in overwhelming force to clear the area.

By November 25, between 52 and 150 insurgents were reported to have been killed and several large weapons caches were discovered by coalition troops. The caches contained several mortar systems with rounds, 15 recoilless rifle rounds, more than a dozen rocket-propelled grenades, 20 anti-aircraft rounds, four fragmentary grenades, 400 rounds of AK-47 ammunition, 1,200 PKM rounds and improvised explosive components. These weapon systems and the ammunition recovered were assessed as intended to be distributed to local INS and used against the near-by COP Honaker-Miracle. By this time, six members of the 101st, one Army Ranger, and three soldiers of the Afghan National Army had been killed.
