= 2011 Zabul province bombing =

Taliban attack in Afghanistan

2 July 2011 Zabul province bombing
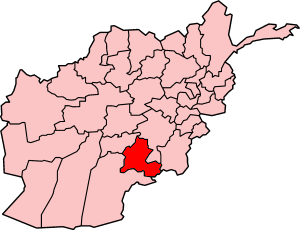
- Location: Zabul Province
- Date: 2 July 2011 (GMT+4:30)
- Target: Civilian refugees
- Attack type: Roadside bomb
- Deaths: 11
- Injuries: n/a
- Perpetrator: Taliban

The 2 July 2011 Zabul province bombing was a roadside bombing that killed 11 members of a family in Zabul Province, Shamulzayi District, Afghanistan, thought to be refugees returning from Pakistan heading to Ghazni Province.
