= Operation Nasrat =

Operation by Afghan insurgents in 2007

- Part of the War in Afghanistan (2001–2021)
Date	September 2007
Location	Helmand, Afghanistan
Result	Taliban victory

Belligerents
United Kingdom; Islamic Republic of Afghanistan	(Afghanistan) Taliban guerrillas

Casualties and losses
(Afghanistan) 34 killed (United Kingdom) 2 killed	Unknown, several suicide bombers detonated

Operation Nasrat ('Triumph') was a military campaign by the Taliban insurgency in September 2007. It was focused on targeting American and Coalition forces operating in Helmand and Kabul Province.

The start of the campaign was timed to coincide with the beginning of Ramadan, and it was announced that it would be led by commander Mullah Beradar, who had been reported killed by Coalition forces a month earlier.

== Timeline ==
The opening day of the operation saw three simultaneous attacks; one strike employed a suicide bomber detonating himself at a police station in Nad Ali District, killing four officers and three civilians. A British logistics convoyed was bombed in Gereshk, killing Cpl. Ivano Violino and destroying his Volvo FL-12 dumptruck. Meanwhile, gunmen killed Haji Merhjan Hadil, a cleric known for his support of the American-backed government.

On October 2, Helmand militant Abdullah Ghazi wore a stolen military uniform and tried to board a bus full of Afghan National Army soldiers, and detonated his explosive vest when confronted. The explosion killed 27 soldiers instantly, and three later died of their wounds.

On October 4, a command wire IED detonated as the British 1st Battalion RGR were returning to their base in Kandahar from a mission in Gereshk, killing Major Alexis Roberts. During the firefight that followed a Taliban mortar team were killed.
