= Operation Hammer Down =

US assault in Afghanistan

- Part of the War in Afghanistan (2001–2021)
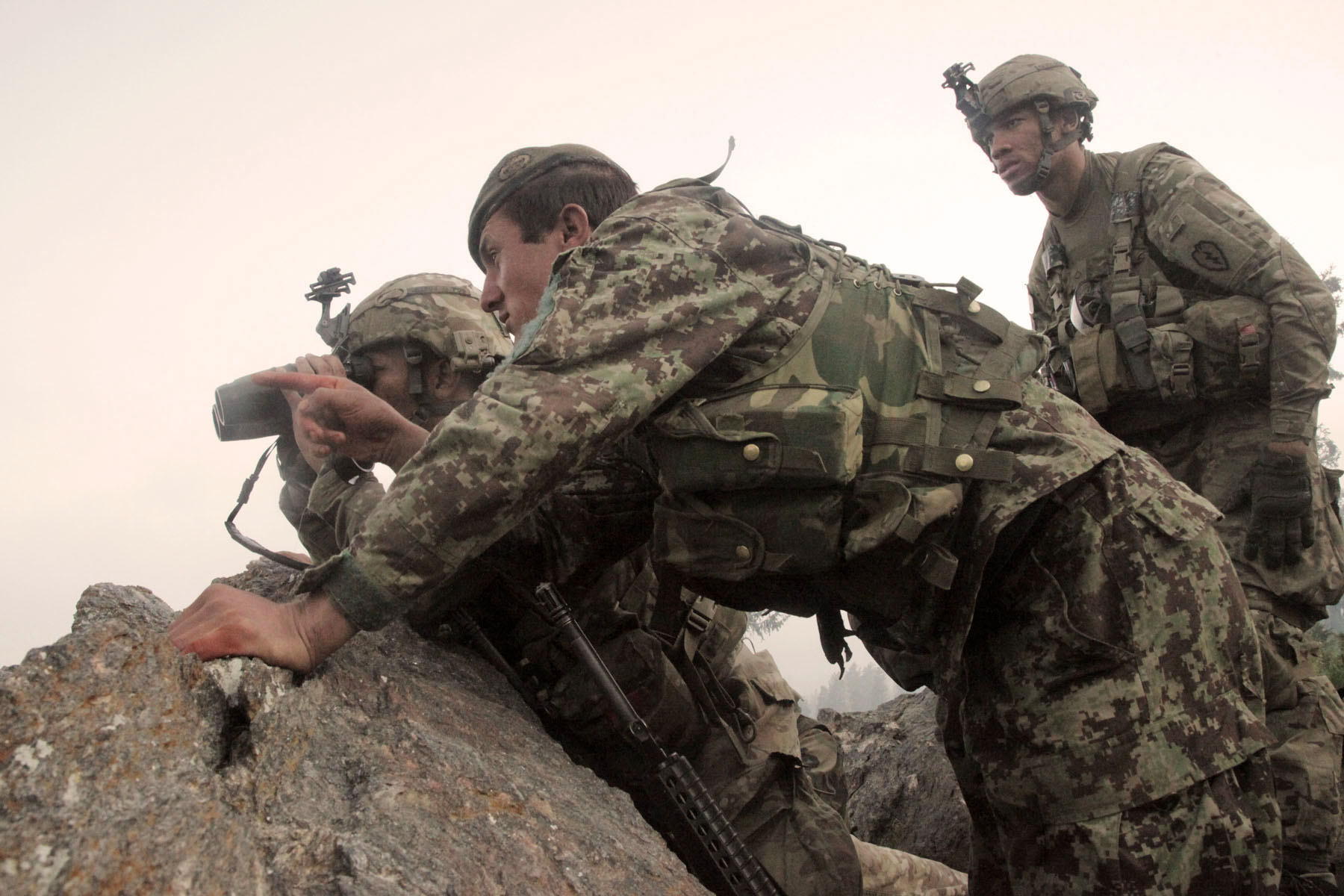
- Two US Army soldiers with an Afghanistan soldier during Operation Hammer Down
Date	24 June 2011 – 30 June 2011
Location	Gambir Jungle, Pech River Valley, Kunar Province, Northeast Afghanistan
Result	Success: Enemy operations disrupted. Foreign-fighter training camps reduced. Enemy lines of communication severely disrupted.

Belligerents
Afghanistan; United States	Taliban

Commanders and leaders
(United States) Colonel Colin P. Tuley	Unknown

Casualties and losses
US: 5 killed Dozens wounded	Taliban: Approximately 124 killed 51 Wounded

Operation Hammer Down was a seven-day U.S.-led assault offensive in June 2011 designed to eliminate foreign fighters and training camps in the Watapur Valley of Kunar Province in Afghanistan in preparation of an eventual push into the Western Pech area. The operation's primary objective was to destroy suspected training camps at the northern end of the Watapur in order to interdict the flow of insurgents through the valley and forbid the Taliban from increasing their manpower in the western Pech. This operation was conducted by the 2nd Battalion 35th Infantry, 3rd Brigade Combat Team, 25th Infantry Division (Task Force Cacti) as a battalion-wide mission that spread each element throughout the area of operations

== Detailed Account ==
Along with Afghan National Army soldiers, US forces were dropped off on a high ridgeline by helicopter just before midnight on June 24, 2011. With all their gear, the soldiers could not scale down the mountain at first. This was until they found a natural land bridge, only to be intercepted by Taliban forces. The firefight lasted four days, and the US forces became "combat ineffective" with only 15 soldiers. Eventually, it got to the point where evacuation was necessary. After destroying the sandbags and walls they were using for cover, the US troops were told to go to an evacuation point where friendly forces would evacuate them. However, once they got to the evacuation point, the helicopters designated to pick them up couldn't reach them due to harsh weather conditions, so they had to attempt to fix the sandbags and wait. Ultimately, they were evacuated and left the area.

== Result/Significance ==
In the end, Enemy operations in the Pech and Watapur valleys were disrupted, the Taliban fighter training camps were reduced, and the Enemy lines of communication were severely disrupted. So, this operation was partially successful, and the US forces significantly impacted the rest of the offensive in the Pech and Watapur Valleys. In the end, another squad was sent in, and they quickly took the camps due to the disruption caused by Operation Hammer Down.

== See also ==
- War in Afghanistan
- International Security Assistance Force
