= Operation Mountain Resolve =

2003 military operation in Afghanistan

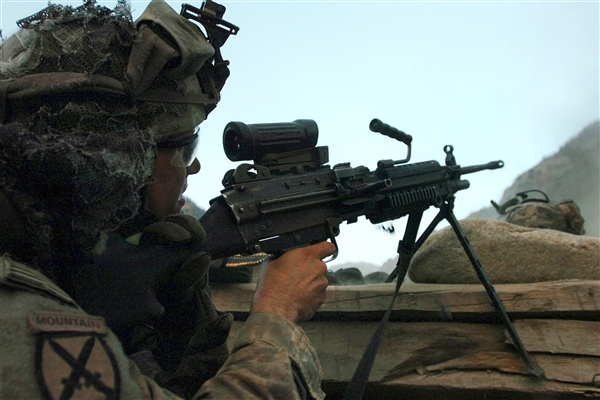
A soldier from the 10th Mountain Division (LT) in Nuristan Province.

Operation Mountain Resolve was launched by a coalition led by the United States on 7 November 2003 in the Nuristan province and Kunar province in Afghanistan. It involved an airdrop into the Hindu Kush mountains by the U.S. 10th Mountain Division and resulted in the killing of Hezbi commander Ghulam Sakhee, a few clashes, and the finding of some minor weapon caches.

== Background ==
Elements of the 2nd Battalion, 22nd Infantry Regiment (2–22 IN), 10th Mountain Division (Light Infantry), were relocated to Bagram Airfield (BAF) from Kandahar in early November, 2003. Their mission was to conduct combat operations in conjunction with the Combined Joint Special Operations Task Force (CJSOTF). After spending a week in the planning process, Alpha, Bravo and 2nd Platoon of Charlie Company, 2–22 IN, were inserted into the Nuristan region of Afghanistan, to conduct a "hammer and anvil" operation. The "hammer" would consist of the elements from 2–22 IN, with the "anvil" being three different elements of various CJSOTF operating in three northern sectors. 2–22 IN was tasked with pushing up the Waygal River Valley in an effort to push suspected Al-Qaeda and Taliban forces further north, into the net established by CJSOTF.

On the night of 6 November 2003, two full companies and one platoon of 2–22 IN (A Co, B Co and C Co's 2nd Platoon) inserted by CH-47 Chinook helicopter into farm fields on the outskirts of Namgalam Village in the eastern Afghan province of Nuristan. 1st and 3rd Platoon of C Co. 2–22 IN were held in reserve as a quick reaction force at BAF. B Co. 2–22 IN was the lead element, with A Co. 2–22 IN screening along B Co's flank on the eastern ridgeline that formed the Waygal River Valley. Approximately 1 kilometer to the front of B Co. was a Scout/ Sniper team providing route reconnaissance and early warning. 2nd Battalion, 87th Infantry Regiment (10th MTN DIV), established a fire base in the vicinity of the insertion landing zone (LZ), which would provide 105 mm howitzer and 120 mm mortar support as well as secure lines of communication and resupply. Due to the restrictive terrain, it became near impossible to conduct a tactical movement using formations other than single file. The first half of the operation occurred over the course of five days, ending with the establishment of resupply LZ's, with B Co. 2 kilometers north of the village of Tazagul Kala, and A Co. approximately 3 kilometers to the southeast near the village of Moladis. In the early evening of 10 November, B Co was ordered to cross the Waygal River and scale the mountain to the east, designated Objective Winchester, to confirm or deny the presence of suspected Taliban and Al Qaeda fighters. The Scout/ Sniper team was already moving across elevated terrain to the objective but had been delayed by an injury to a soldier who required aerial medical evacuation. Upon reaching Objective Winchester, several detainees were taken for questioning but evidence suggested that the majority of Anti-Coalition militants had fled to the north 1–2 days prior. B Co. remained on OBJ Winchester throughout the night. A Navy SEAL command and control team co-located on the resupply LZ at the base of the mountain directed AC 130 Specter Gunship fires onto enemy positions observed by the aircraft, but no battle damage assessment was able to be conducted from the ground due to the restrictive terrain. The next morning all 2–22 IN elements were extracted and returned to BAF.

== Follow Up ==
One week later, 2–22 IN elements, again from A Co, B Co and C co. 2nd Platoon were sent back into the Waygal River Valley based on intelligence received indicating the possible presence of a High Value Target (HVT) in the vicinity of the village of Aranas, located approximately 8–10 kilometers northeast of the extraction LZ from the previous week. 1st and 2nd Platoons from B Co. inserted into blocking positions on the terraced farm fields surrounding Aranas. 3rd Platoon B Co. moved from a blocking position and began searching the village. A Co. was inserted into almost hip deep snow, to establish an outer cordon 4–5 kilometers to the northeast. The search yielded similar results as Objective Winchester, signs of ACM presence, but the militants having pushed to the northeast 1–2 days prior. Due to the severely restrictive terrain, in order to be extracted, the companies had to move to their prior extraction LZ, making the 15 kilometer movement in less than 3 hours to make the extraction time. All companies extracted on time and returned to BAF via CH-47 Chinook. All told, the planning and conduct of Operation Mountain Resolve encompassed nearly one month. The actions of the CJSOTF operating to the north are currently classified so the final results of the operation are unknown.

== Problems Encountered ==
Tactical Movement was difficult, and near impossible in any formation other than a file. In this region which bordered Pakistan, the large signature created by the massive Air Assault gave ACMs the opportunity to flee across the border. Individual Soldier Loads were cumbersome but necessary due to the extended nature of the operation. At one point, local pack mules were procured and used to haul equipment into higher elevations.

== Sources ==
Department of the Army, Bravo Company, 2nd Battalion, 22nd Infantry Regiment, 10th Mountain Division (LI), Kandahar, Afghanistan, APO AE 09355, 20 November 2003, Memorandum for Record

Defend America, "10th Mtn. Div. Shows its Mettle in Operation Mountain Resolve: Part 1," <https://web.archive.org/web/20070215035639/http://defendamerica.mil/articles/nov2003/a111703e.html> [3 February 2007]

Defend America, "10th Mtn. Div. Shows its Mettle in Operation Mountain Resolve: Part 2," <https://web.archive.org/web/20060724185705/http://defendamerica.mil/articles/nov2003/a111703f.html> [3 February 2007]

Defend America, "DOD Afghanistan Update," <https://web.archive.org/web/20070928145641/http://www.defendamerica.gov/afghanistan/update/nov2003/au112103.html> [3 February 2007]

Fort Drum, New York, Blizzard, 26 November 2003
