= Operation Luger =

2007 Canadian-Afghan military operation

Operation Luger was a joint military operation between the Canadian Forces and Afghan National Army. In July 2007, the Afghan-led operation was intended to enhance security within the Panjwayii district.
