= Operation Baawar =

2010 Afghan military operation

- Part of the War in Afghanistan (2001–2021)
Date	December 2010
Location	Kandahar, Kandahar Province, Afghanistan
Result	Coalition victory

Belligerents
Islamic Republic of Afghanistan; Canada (2010–14); United States	(Afghanistan) Taliban

Commanders and leaders
Unknown	Unknown

Strength
Unknown	Unknown

Casualties and losses
Confirmed; 1 killed	Unknown

Operation Baawar (Pashto for assurance), was a major Afghan-led offensive in Afghanistan west of the city of Kandahar. The operation took place primarily in a sector known as the Horn of Panjwaii. The combat operation started on December 5, 2010. Canadian troops from Task Force Kandahar, including those from the 1st Battalion Royal 22^{e} Régiment Battle Group, worked with the Afghan National Army's 1st Brigade of the 205th (Hero) Corps as part of the larger Operation Hamkari. Part of Operation Baawar included Canadian and Afghan engineering units building 17 kilometres (11 mi) of road between Mushan and Sperwan Ghar.

== Timeline of battle ==
On December 7, 2010, soldiers from the Royal 22^{e} Régiment had taken a Taliban stronghold in the district of Zangabad south-west of the city of Kandahar. The Canadian troops in Zangabad were supported by Leopard 2A6M tanks from 12^{e} Régiment blindé du Canada and engineers.

On December 18, Corporal Steve Martin, from 3rd Battalion, Royal 22^{e} Régiment, serving with 1st Battalion, Royal 22^{e} Régiment Battle Group, was killed by an improvised explosive device in the Panjwai district of Kandahar Province. He was reportedly patrolling on foot near the new road being built in the area when the blast occurred.
