= Kunduz Offensive (2017) =

- Part of War in Afghanistan (2001–present)
Date	May 2017
Location	Kunduz Province
Territorial changes	Taliban takes many towns, cuts roads to Kunduz

Belligerents
(Afghanistan) Taliban	Islamic Republic of Afghanistan

Commanders and leaders
Unknown	Unknown

Strength
Unknown	Unknown

Casualties and losses
Unknown	Unknown

The Kunduz Offensive was a military offensive by the Taliban towards Kunduz. The Taliban took many towns surrounding Kunduz but failed to capture the city.
