= Eastern Afghanistan Operations =

Afghan operation

Date	1507 C.E.
Location	Nangarhar, Laghman, Kafiristan and Kunar, Afghanistan
Result	Successful operations of subjugation of neighboring Afghans and Kafirs.

Belligerents
Timurids of Kabul	Afghans; Siah-Posh Kafirs? Safed-Posh Kaffirs?

Commanders and leaders
Babur	?

Eastern Afghanistan Operations was when Uzbek Khan and Muhammad Shaybani surrounded Kandahar, Babur found his developing Kingdom of Kabul in danger. He feared that Kabul would be the next target of the Uzbeks.

Having consulted with his men, he decided the only way out was to leave to India. Babur's second Indian expedition (as considered by many Muslim historians, including Abu'l-Fazl ibn Mubarak), became an operation monitoring Kabul, traveling around eastern provinces of Afghanistan to subdue rebellious Afghans and plunder towns and villages for supplies for his army's survival.

== Skirmishes in Laghman & Nangarhar ==
In September 1507, while marching from Kabul to India, Babur went through Little Kabul. On reaching Robat-i-Surkh, he passed Kuruk Sai by the hilliard pass. The Afghans living between Kabul and Laghman knew that Babur was trying to make his escape, and so decided to attack him. When Babur marched out from Jegdalek, the Afghans of Khizrkhel, Shimukhel, Ghilzai or Khalji and Khogyani formed plans of obstructing his march through the Lataband Pass and on the hill which lay to the north of the Lataband Pass. They beat their drums and brandished their swords raising terrific shouts. Babur ordered the troops to ascend the hill and attack the enemy each in the direction nearest to him.

His troops advanced and made their way through different valleys and by any approach possible. They got nearer to them, and the Afghans immediately took flight without even shooting an arrow. After driving off the Afghans he reached the top of the ascent. He halted in Nangarhar before the fort of Jalalabad. Here, he separated the army into four divisions who were to move about, some up the country and others down till he received intelligence of both the Afghans and the Uzbeks.

== Plunders Alishang ==
He then decided to plunder Alishang where the Kafirs had sown great quantities of rice and thought probably that the troops might be able to confiscating their winter's corn. Leaving Nangarhar, he pushed speedily ahead to Saigal and advanced up to the valley of Birain. Kafirs had posted some men in a breastwork on a commanding eminence in the valley of Birain and they descended rapidly from the hill and began to fire arrows. Having wounded Puran, son-in-law of Qasim Bayg, they were on the verge of coming up to him and taking him prisoner when the rest of his party made a push to drive out the enemy, and rescued him. Babur stayed one night in the Kafirs rice fields where he took a great quantity of grain and then returned to camp.

== Expedition in Kunar ==
At that time Mukim Beg Arghun's daughter Mah Chuchak, was married to Qasim Kokaltash (later wife of Shah Hassan) in the Mendraur. It was at this time that Babur found it inexpedient to proceed in his expedition to India and sent back Mullah Baba Beshagheri with a few troops towards Kabul. Marching through Mendraur he proceeded by Ater Ghar (NE Jalalabad) and Shiweh and continued for some days till he went on to Kunar province and Nurgul district along the Kunar River and examined the country in a raft.

== Turn of events in Kandahar & Return ==
News came from Nasir Mirza via Mullah Mirak Ferketi about the Uzbek siege of Kandahar. Muhammad Shaybani had abandoned the siege even after having taken the walled town of Kandahar but without having taken the citadel. Still, Nasir Mirza had abandoned Kandahar on several accounts and retired to Ghazni. The reason for the Uzbek retreat was that when Muhammad Shaybani came against Kandahar he had sent his Harem to Nirehtu, a fort east of Herat. Some persons having revolted in Nirehtu had seized the fort. Muhammad Shaybani hurriedly patched up a sort of peace and retired.

Relieved, Babur returned to Kabul through Badij. He reassigned governments, giving Ghazni to Nasir Mirza, Mendraur and the valleys of Darrah Nur to Nanagarh, and Kunar and Nurgul to Abdal Razak Mirza. Babur himself abandoned the title of Mirza and adopted the title of Padishah or King.
