= Balamorghab ambush =

2008 ambush in the War in Afghanistan

- Part of the War in Afghanistan (2001–2021)
Date	27 November 2008
Location	Badghis Province, Afghanistan.
Result	Taliban victory

Belligerents
Islamic Republic of Afghanistan	(Afghanistan) Taliban

Commanders and leaders
Unknown	Ghulam Dastagir

Units involved
ANA ANP	(Afghanistan) Taliban guerrilla fighters

Strength
200	200+ insurgents

Casualties and losses
14 killed 27 injured 20 captured 19 vehicles destroyed 5 vehicles captured	Unknown

The Balamorghab ambush occurred on 27 November 2008, when vehicles carrying Afghan security forces were attacked by Taliban insurgents led by Ghulam Dastagir. The ambush took place near Balamorghab in Badghis Province, in northwestern Afghanistan, and resulted in heavy casualties for the government forces. It was described as "one of the most humiliating attacks the Afghan security forces had ever suffered".

== Background ==
Badghis province had seen a marked increase in insurgent activity, In 2007 the number of Taliban militants was estimated at 200, by 2008 it had grown to over 2,000. In March 2008, an Afghan intelligence operation succeeded in arresting Mawlawi Ghulam Dastagir, one of the principal Taliban commanders in Badghis. In September a delegation of elders from Badghis met Afghan President Hamid Karzai, and persuaded him to release Dastagir, claiming that "he wasn't an enemy of the state".

== Ambush ==
On 26 November a supply convoy guarded by 200 men of the Afghan National Army (ANA) and the Afghan National Police (ANP) left Qala i Naw, the capital of Badghis province, for the village of Balamorghab. Their objective was to supply a police force position in the village, which was considered a Taliban stronghold. On 27 November the convoy was travelling down a narrow gorge near Balamorghab, when it was hit by small-arms and rocket-propelled grenade fire. An oil tanker was set on fire, which blocked the road, and the different sections of the convoy became separated. The insurgent attack lasted several hours, ending only after the arrival of Afghan commandos in helicopters. During the engagement, five policemen and nine soldiers were killed, 20 members of the security forces were injured and 20 captured. In addition 19 vehicles were destroyed and 5 captured by the insurgents. A Spanish military unit was called for help, but the Spanish troops were heavily constrained by restrictive rules of engagement and so were only able to provide covering fire from a distance to support the convoy as it retreated. The incident was described as "one of the most humiliating attacks the Afghan security forces had ever suffered". When interviewed after the attack Dastagir enthusiastically confirmed that he had led the attack.

== Aftermath ==
Karzais decision to release Dastagir was criticised, especially after some officials claimed the elders who secured his release were acting under orders from the Taliban. The command of the ANA 207 Corps was also criticised, as the unit had previously suffered losses in other provinces. Over the preceding three years, insurgent forces in Badghis have grown from almost nothing to a strength estimated at several hundred. On 16 February 2009 Afghan officials claimed that Dastagir and his deputy had been killed in an airstrike in Balamorghab. The Taliban later confirmed their deaths.
