= Battle of Shewan =

2008 military engagement in Afghanistan

Coordinates: 32.6250°N 62.4881°E

- Part of the War in Afghanistan (2001–2021)
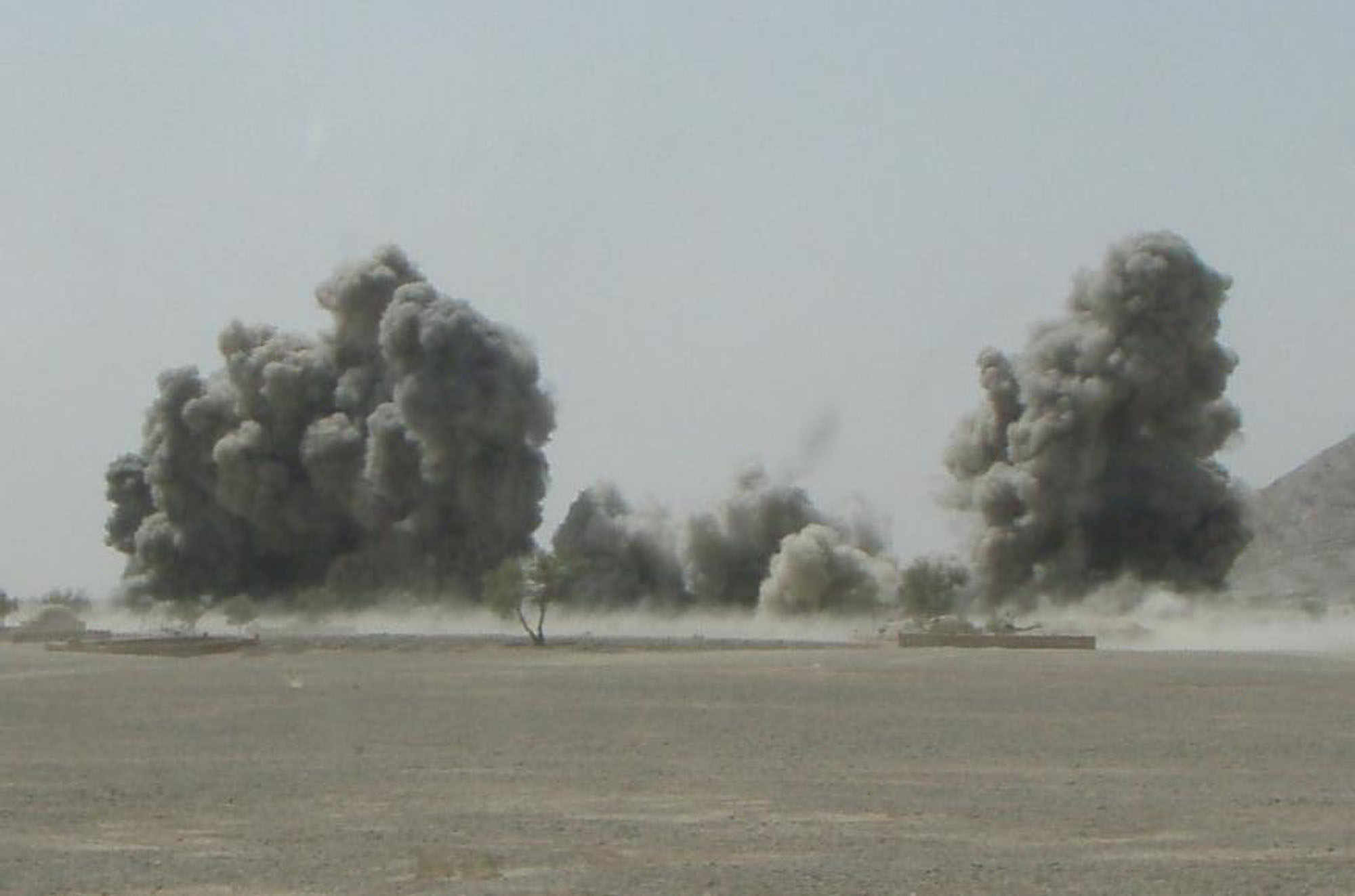
- Airstrike in Shewan during the battle.
Date	August 8, 2008
Location	Bala Buluk district, Farah Province, Afghanistan.
Result	US victory

Belligerents
United States	(Afghanistan) Taliban

Strength
30 members of Golf Company, 2nd Battalion, 7th Marines; 30 members of Force Recon Marines Unknown number of Afghan National Police	250-350 insurgents

Casualties and losses
2 injured	50+ killed (US claim)

The Battle of Shewan was a military engagement between coalition forces and Taliban insurgents that took place on August 8, 2008, near the village of Shewan in the Bala Buluk district, Farah Province, Afghanistan.

On August 8, 2008, elements from 2nd platoon, Golf Company, 2nd Battalion 7th Marines, and 2nd Platoon, 1st Force Reconnaissance Company, conducted a clearing operation of the village. After approximately eight hours of heavy combat, the coalition marines defeated approximately 250-350 Taliban fighters.

== Background ==
The village of Shewan was a Taliban headquarters used by several key leaders of the insurgency to plan and stage attacks on coalition forces in the area. U.S. intelligence estimated between 100 and 250 full-time fighters resided in the village. They controlled Route 517, the main east–west supply route, isolating coalition and Afghan national forces to the west. Opening the route was key to continuing combat operations in the area. Unknown to the Marines, there was a meeting of high-level Taliban commanders in the village that day, bringing with them an additional 100 well-trained fighters.

Previous attempts by the American or coalition troops to secure the village and Route 517 had produced bloody skirmishes that left a number of troops killed and wounded. The Taliban were regarded as a formidable enemy. One soldier who had fought in Iraq commented, “They were completely different from the enemy fighters in Iraq. They were diehard, and they wanted a stand-up fight.”

The leaders of the Golf 2 and Force Recon platoons planned an assault on Shewan for several weeks. It was delayed on 6 August and approved on 7 August. The Marines departed in the early hours of the morning on 8 August in two different sections, Force Recon heading down Route 517 and Golf 2 around Saffarak Mountain.

== The battle ==
Force Recon traveled up Highway 517 directly into Shewan. Two teams dismounted and patrolled the valley over about 10 kilometres (6.2 mi) on foot before entering the village. Golf 2 circled around Saffarak Mountain and set up a blocking position from the North. Their platoon included an 81 mm mortar team to provide support for Force Recon and others who would serve as a quick reaction force (QRF). Golf 2 began receiving reports from the Afghan National Police (ANP) that there was movement to their north and many policemen began firing nervously into the trees in front of them.

Just before noon, Force Recon began taking heavy small arms and RPG fire on the outskirts of Shewan from a long fortified trench line and ditches on the south side the village. The temperature rose to 120 degrees during the fight, exhausting the Marines who had already covered many miles in their heavy protective gear, leading the corpsman to advise two soldiers they risked death if they rejoined the battle, which they did anyway.

A large number of Taliban soldiers emerged from the village and took positions in buildings, trenches, ditches, and behind trees. Taliban fighters fired repeated volleys of RPGs at the Force Recon platoon from the treeline. One Humvee was struck multiple times and caught fire. The crew suffered minor shrapnel wounds and were able to dismount but had little cover and were pinned down. Another Humvee was disabled.

Other Force Recon Marines in a Mine-Resistant Ambush Protected (MRAP) vehicle drove into the kill zone, placing it between the attackers in the trench line and the pinned-down Marines. To their surprise all five Marines were still alive. They placed heavy machine gun fire at a cyclic rate on the enemy and evacuated the injured, placing them inside the MRAP.

Golf 2 reinforced by the ANP got back into their trucks and moved quickly onto Route 517 toward the smoke from the burning Humvee. The platoon pulled off the road on line and sped towards the berm that ran parallel to the city, firing their crew-served weapons at the Taliban positions. The Taliban soldiers began firing 82mm mortar rounds at the coalition forces as they approached the village. Golf 2 halted behind the berm and dismounted, continuing to return fire, but the enemy RPG machine gun fire intensified.

The Marines were killing many Taliban but many more emerged from the village compounds and buildings. Simmons positioned himself in an exposed position on the edge of a rise and began targeting Taliban with his Mk 11 sniper rifle. He killed 18 and had two more possible kills, totaling 21 shots in 20 minutes. Force Recon commander Capt. Byron Owen could see the enemy reinforcements were growing and attempting to flank the Marines. Forward air controller Capt. Joe Begley's request for air support was denied. Owen got on the radio and reported that his unit was in extreme danger and if they did not receive help quickly he would have to declare "Broken Arrow" within 20 minutes, indicating the unit was in danger of being overrun.

By this time the attached Golf 2 81 mm mortar crew began firing volleys into the trenchlines from targets called in by their Forward Observer. The mortars suppressed Taliban fire until air support arrived. A section of two F-15s from the 494th Fighter Squadron strafed the Taliban positions with their cannons. At Owen's insistence, pilot Col. Mark D. Kelly dropped a 500 lb bomb danger close, about 70 metres (230 ft) from the Marine's position.

Despite numerous airstrikes, the Taliban continued to fight, utilizing their fortified positions to shield them from the airstrikes. They continued to fire mortar and RPG rounds at the marines. The F-15 section checked off station and were replaced by a Rockwell B-1 Lancer from the 34th Bomb Squadron. The B-1 dropped three more airstrikes into the trench system, but the Taliban continued to fight. The Force Recon platoon, reinforced by a squad from Golf 2, led a trench assault on the eastern portion of the Taliban fighting positions.

Several hours into the fight, convoys of vehicles carrying an estimated 100 Taliban reinforcements with weapons and supplies arrived in the city. The Marines attacked the vehicles and the occupants and fired another volley of mortars and airstrikes as Force Recon continued to assault their way into the Taliban fighting positions. The Taliban were sustaining heavy casualties, and began to retreat into the buildings to hide from the coalition fire. More air attacks were fired on the buildings, though the Taliban fire was beginning to slow down, and the Marines were now only receiving sporadic mortar fire. The coalition spotted a Taliban mortar team operating in the mountains, and an 81 mm mortar strike was called onto their position, killing them. The Marines fell back and set up a perimeter around the buildings, cutting off the Taliban completely, and continued to engage Taliban fighters with their crew served weapons. Another bombing run destroyed the damaged Humvee while Marines prepared to disengage. During the lull in the fighting, the remaining Taliban fighters attempted to retreat into the mountains, but Golf 2 killed them before they were able to reach the safety of the rocks.

== Results ==
The battle was the longest of 2nd Battalion, 7th Marines deployment, lasting over 8 hours. Outnumbered eight to one, no Marines died and over 50 Taliban soldiers were killed. The battle restored coalition freedom of movement in the area. The Taliban did not attack the area again for months.

== Commendations ==
Five Bronze Stars with V for valor.

Six Navy-Marine Corps Commendations with V were approved for Marines and Navy hospital corpsmen.

Sgt. Franklin Simmons, Silver Star

Capt. Byron Owen, Silver Star

Brian Blonder, Navy Cross
