= Operation Avalanche (Afghanistan) =

U.S.-led coalition offensive in Afghanistan

- Part of the War in Afghanistan (2001–2021)
Date	December 2003
Location	Southeast Afghanistan
Result	Indecisive

Belligerents
Transitional Islamic State of Afghanistan; United States	Taliban

Commanders and leaders
(Transitional Islamic State of Afghanistan) Bismillah Khan Mohammadi (United States) Tommy Franks	(Taliban) Mohammed Omar

Casualties and losses
(Transitional Islamic State of Afghanistan) 2 killed	10 killed 100 captured
- 15 Afghan children killed

Operation Avalanche was a four-week U.S.-led aggression in December 2003 designed to disrupt a resurgence in insurgent activity in the southeastern territory of Afghanistan and to establish conditions for the provision of humanitarian aid. Described by the U.S. government as the biggest ground operation in Afghanistan since the fall of the Taliban in late 2001, the offensive led to the capture of more than 100 suspects and the deaths of 10. Two soldiers from the US backed Afghan National Army were killed. The operation was marred by the accidental killings of 15 children in raids on suspected insurgents.

The operation involved 2,000 U.S. soldiers supported by Western backed Afghan troops, but failed to engage any Taliban or allied insurgents.

Patrols were conducted and caves searched over a 40 square mile (100 km^{2}) area. Little of note was discovered in the caves.
