= Nawzad District =

Nawzad نوزاد
- District
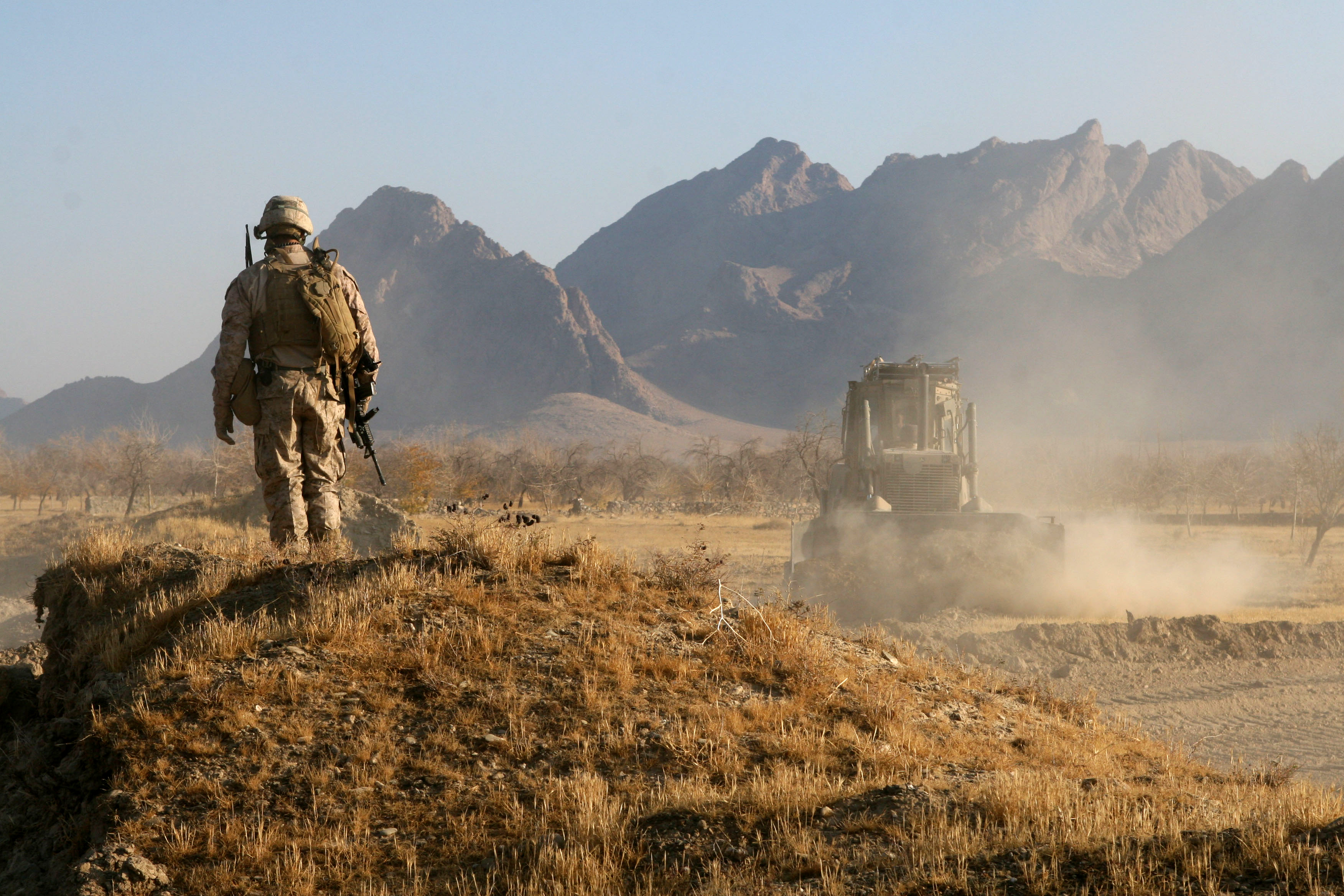
- A US Marine combat engineer in Nawzad in December 2009.

- Location within Afghanistan
- Coordinates: 32°13′14″N 64°34′36″E
- Country: Afghanistan
- Province: Helmand Province

Population (2012)
  - Total: 49,500

Nawzad (Pashto: نوزاد) is a district in the north of Helmand Province, Afghanistan. Its population, which is 100% Pashtun, was estimated at 49,500 in 2012. The district centre is the village of Nawzad; there are 14 other large villages and over 100 smaller villages. During the war in Afghanistan, the district became deadly as it was the site of the Taliban insurgents. As a result, president Obama leashed his surge in Afghanistan. During the year 2006-2014 the battle of Nawzad took place in the district. This affected the district heavily til today. As a consequence, many houses and infrastructure are still in ruins. The district is said to be dry and humid, where the levels of water are low.
