= Operation Warrior Sweep =

2003 operation in the War in Afghanistan

Operation Warrior Sweep was a 2003 operation in the War in Afghanistan. It involved a July 20, 2003 deployment of about 1,000 soldiers of the Afghan National Army, together with U.S.-led coalition troops, in the Zormat Valley region and the 3,260 meter-high peaks of the Ayubkhel Valley in the southern Paktia Province in Afghanistan. The operation was in response to intelligence reports that some Taliban and al-Qaeda operatives were active in the area. It marked the first major combat operation for the Afghan troops. The Operation was completed in mid-September.

By July 29, soldiers from the 82nd Airborne Division were transported in by CH-47 Chinook helicopters to assist in the Operation.

The coalition forces uncovered dozens of grenades, C-4 plastic explosives, a crate of dynamite, more than 20 rocket propelled grenade rounds, a box of anti-aircraft rounds and hundreds of 7.62 mm and handgun rounds.

Neither Taliban nor al-Qaeda guerrillas were encountered. U.S.-led coalition forces cleared illegal checkpoints from a number of key roads, including the main road leading from Gardez to Khost. The Afghan Army secured the road leading to Zormat.

When U.S. forces arrived in the village of Atel Mohammed, residents hid their Qurans and other religious items. They feared that U.S. soldiers would kill them if they discovered they were Muslim. U.S. soldiers explained to the villagers that this was not the case.

Toward the conclusion of the Operation in mid-September, forces from the United States, Italy, Romania and Afghanistan discovered several secret caves and caches containing more than 20,000 pieces of ordnance.
