= Operation Headstrong =

- Part of the War in Afghanistan (2001–2021)
Date	2004 (with continued assistance thereafter)
Location	Afghanistan

Belligerents
United Kingdom; Afghanistan	Taliban

Strength
150	

Operation Headstrong involved the training of Afghan commandos in a grouping called the Afghan Special Narcotics Force (ASNF) by British special forces, including the Special Air Service, to seek out and destroy drug laboratories and to confiscate drug shipments. Britain later provided four helicopters for the ASNF's use. British assistance to the ASNF amounted to £6.23 million in 2005–6, £9.4 million in 2006–7, and £32.5 million in 2007–8.

== Background ==
Britain was the lead nation on counternarcotics in the Bonn Agreement and began forming a counternarcotics force known as Task Force 333, which would attack labs processing opium into crystal heroin. Elite Afghan units were trained and mentored by members of the British SAS.

== Operation ==
The operation, dubbed Operation Headstrong was launched on 2 January 2004 with a raid on a heroin lab in northern Badakhshan.

By mid-2004, Force 333 had two operational units of 150 men each. One former Force 333 commander said that whenever the group hit a lab in the south of the country, they were guaranteed to get attacked, for example during a raid on a large lab in Bahramcha, Helmand Province, the lab owner called the local Taliban subcommander who ambushed the force. The ambush was so vicious the commander had to call in US air support to suppress it.
