= 2015 Khost suicide bombing =

Afghanistan suicide bombing 2015

- Part of War in Afghanistan (2001–present)
- Location of Khost Province in Afghanistan
- Location: Khost Province, Afghanistan
- Date: 12 July 2015
- Attack type: suicide bombing
- Deaths: 33
- Injuries: 10

The Khost suicide bombing occurred on 12 July 2015 when a car bomb detonated in Khost, Afghanistan, killing 33 and wounding 10, including children.

The bombing occurred near to a military checkpoint on the edge of the city. Among the dead were at least 12 children. No military personnel were killed.

== See also ==
- War in Afghanistan (2015–2021)
- Camp Chapman attack
