= Taliban insurgency =

Insurgency during the war in Afghanistan

- Part of the War in Afghanistan (2001–2021), the Afghan conflict, and the war on terror
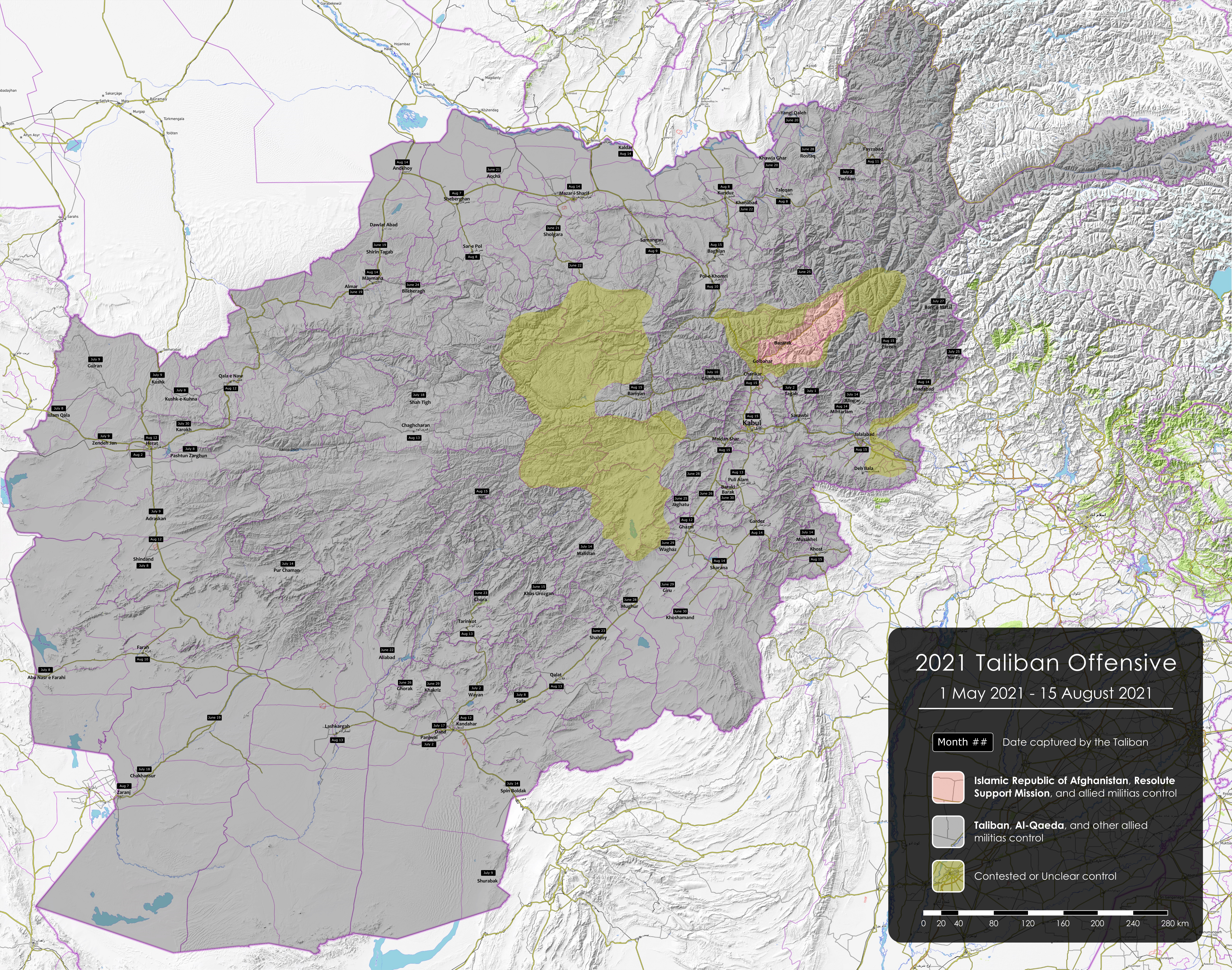
- Map of the 2021 Taliban offensive.
Date	18 December 2001 – 15 August 2021 (19 years, 7 months and 4 weeks)
Location	Islamic Republic of Afghanistan
Result	Taliban victory: Coalition failure to quell the insurgency; Fall of the Islamic Republic of Afghanistan; Reestablishment of the Islamic Emirate of Afghanistan; Republican insurgency in Afghanistan begins

Belligerents
Islamic State of Afghanistan (2001–2002); Afghan Transitional Authority (2002–2004); Islamic Republic of Afghanistan (2004–2021); Afghan National Security Forces; ISAF (2001–2014): Albania; Armenia (IPAP); Australia (GP); Austria (PfP); Azerbaijan (PfP); Bahrain (ICI); Belgium; Bosnia and Herzegovina (IPAP); Bulgaria (Note: Major contributing nations with more than 200 troops as of May 2015); Canada; Croatia; Czech Republic; Denmark; El Salvador; Estonia; Finland (PfP); France; Georgia (IPAP); Germany; Greece; Hungary; Iceland; Iran (2002–2002); Ireland (PfP); Italy; Jordan (MD); Latvia; Lithuania; Luxembourg; Malaysia; Mongolia (GP); Montenegro (PfP); Netherlands; New Zealand (GP); Norway; Poland; Portugal; North Macedonia (MAP); Romania; Singapore (2008–13); Slovakia; Slovenia; South Korea (GP); Spain; Sweden (PfP); Switzerland (2004–08) (PfP); Tonga; Turkey; Ukraine (PfP); United Arab Emirates (ICI); United Kingdom; United States; RS (2015 onwards): Luxembourg; Slovenia; New Zealand; Greece; Austria; Ukraine; Sweden; Montenegro; Latvia; Estonia; North Macedonia; Lithuania; Slovakia; Norway; Finland; Bosnia and Herzegovina; Belgium; Hungary; Albania; Azerbaijan; Armenia; Denmark; Bulgaria; Netherlands; Portugal; Mongolia; Poland; Australia; Croatia; Czech Republic; Georgia (IPAP); Germany; Italy; Romania; Spain; Turkey; United Kingdom; United States; Allied militias: High Council of the Islamic Emirate of Afghanistan (allegedly since 2015)	Taliban; Haqqani network (from 2002); Al-Qaeda; Al-Qaeda in the Indian Subcontinent; Jamaat Ansarullah; Taliban splinter groups; Mullah Dadullah Front (from 2012); Fidai Mahaz (from 2013); Supported by: Hezb-e-Islami Gulbuddin (on and off until 2016); Islamic Jihad Union (from 2002); Islamic Movement of Uzbekistan (until 2015); Turkistan Islamic Party; Lashkar-e-Jhangvi; Pakistani Taliban; Lashkar-e-Islam; Iran (alleged, but denied by Iran); Pakistan (alleged, but denied by Pakistan); Russia (alleged, but denied by Russia); Saudi Arabia (alleged, but denied by Saudi Arabia); Qatar (alleged by Saudi Arabia, but denied by Qatar); China (alleged by the US, but denied by China)

Commanders and leaders
(Islamic Republic of Afghanistan) Ashraf Ghani (President of Afghanistan); (Islamic Republic of Afghanistan) Abdullah Abdullah (CEO of Afghanistan); (Islamic Republic of Afghanistan) Abdul Rashid Dostum (Vice-President of Afghanistan); (Islamic Republic of Afghanistan) Mohammad Mohaqiq (Deputy CEO of Afghanistan); (Islamic Republic of Afghanistan) Atta Muhammad Nur (Governor of Balkh Province); (Islamic Republic of Afghanistan) Bismillah Khan Mohammadi (Defense Minister of Afghanistan); (Islamic Republic of Afghanistan) Sher Mohammad Karimi (Chief of Army Staff); Nangialai †; Abdul Manan Niazi †; Coalition: ISAF (2001–2014): (United States) Tommy Franks; (United States) Dan K. McNeill; (United States) David Barno; (United States) Karl Eikenberry; (United States) David D. McKiernan; (United States) Stanley A. McChrystal; (United States) David Petraeus; (United States) John R. Allen; (Germany) Egon Ramms; (Canada) Guy Laroche; RS (2015 onwards): (Luxembourg) Xavier Bettel; (Slovenia) Borut Pahor; (New Zealand) Jacinda Ardern; (New Zealand) Bill English; (New Zealand) John Key; (Greece) Kyriakos Mitsotakis; (Greece) Alexis Tsipras; (Austria) Alexander Van der Bellen; (Austria) Heinz Fischer; (Ukraine) Volodymyr Zelenskyy; (Ukraine) Petro Poroshenko; (Sweden) Göran Persson; (Sweden) Fredrik Reinfeldt; (Sweden) Stefan Löfven; (Montenegro) Milo Đukanović; (Montenegro) Filip Vujanović; (Latvia) Egils Levits; (Latvia) Raimonds Vējonis; (Estonia) Kersti Kaljulaid; (Estonia) Toomas Hendrik Ilves; (North Macedonia) Stevo Pendarovski; (North Macedonia) Gjorge Ivanov; (Lithuania) Gitanas Nausėda; (Lithuania) Dalia Grybauskaitė; (Slovakia) Zuzana Čaputová; (Slovakia) Andrej Kiska; (Slovakia) Robert Fico; (Slovakia) Peter Pellegrini; (Slovakia) Igor Matovič; (Slovakia) Eduard Heger; (Norway) Erna Solberg; (Finland) Sauli Niinistö; (Spain) Pedro Sánchez; (Spain) Mariano Rajoy; (Bosnia and Herzegovina) Sifet Podžić; (Bosnia and Herzegovina) Marina Pendeš; (Belgium) Sophie Wilmès; (Belgium) Charles Michel; (Hungary) János Áder; (Hungary) Viktor Orbán; (Albania) Ilir Meta; (Albania) Bujar Nishani; (Croatia) Zoran Milanović; (Croatia) Kolinda Grabar-Kitarović; (Azerbaijan) Ilham Aliyev; (Armenia) Nikol Pashinyan; (Armenia) Karen Karapetyan; (Armenia) Hovik Abrahamyan; (Denmark) Mette Frederiksen; (Denmark) Lars Løkke Rasmussen; (Bulgaria) Rumen Radev; (Bulgaria) Rosen Plevneliev; (Netherlands) Mark Rutte; (Portugal) Marcelo Rebelo de Sousa; (Portugal) Aníbal Cavaco Silva; (Australia) Scott Morrison; (Australia) Malcolm Turnbull; (Mongolia) Khaltmaagiin Battulga; (Mongolia) Tsakhiagiin Elbegdorj; (Czech Republic) Miloš Zeman; (Poland) Andrzej Duda; (Turkey) Recep Tayyip Erdoğan; (Romania) Klaus Iohannis; (Georgia (country)) Salome Zourabichvili; (Georgia (country)) Giorgi Margvelashvili; (Italy) Giuseppe Conte; (Italy) Paolo Gentiloni; (Italy) Matteo Renzi; (Germany) Angela Merkel; (United States) Joe Biden; (United States) Donald Trump; (United States) Barack Obama; (United Kingdom) Boris Johnson; (United Kingdom) Theresa May; (United Kingdom) David Cameron; John F. Campbell	(Taliban) Hibatullah Akhundzada (Supreme Commander); Sirajuddin Haqqani (Deputy of the Taliban); Mohammad Yaqoob (Deputy of the Taliban); (Taliban) Jalaluddin Haqqani # (Leader of Haqqani Network); Gulbuddin Hekmatyar (2002–2016); Ayman al-Zawahiri (Emir of al-Qaeda); Abdul Ghani Baradar (head of Taliban Diplomatic Office); (Taliban) Mansoor Dadullah † (Commander of the Dadullah Front); Haji Najibullah (Commander of Fidai Mahaz); (Taliban) Mullah Omar # (Commander of the Faithful); (Taliban) Akhtar Mansoor † (Supreme Commander); Obaidullah Akhund † (former Taliban Minister of Defense); (Taliban) Mohammad Fazl (POW) (former Deputy Defense Minister); Abdul Qayyum Zakir (former Taliban military chief); (Taliban) Dadullah Akhund † (senior commander); Osama bin Laden † (former Emir of al-Qaeda)

Strength
(Islamic Republic of Afghanistan): Afghan National Security Forces; Afghan Armed Forces: 352,000; RSM: 13,000+; High Council of the Islamic Emirate of Afghanistan: 3,000–3,500; ISAF: 18,000+; Military contractors: 20,000+	Taliban: 60,000 (tentative estimate); Haqqani network: 4,000–15,000; HIG: 1,500–2,000+; al-Qaeda: 100–800; Fidai Mahaz: 8,000

Casualties and losses
Afghan Security Forces: Killed: 65,596+; Wounded: 16,500+; Coalition: Dead: 3,486 (all causes); 2,807 (hostile causes); United States: 2,356; United Kingdom: 454; Canada: 158; France: 88; Germany: 57; Italy: 53; Others: 321; Wounded: 22,773; United States: 19,950; United Kingdom: 2,188; Canada: 635; Contractors: Dead: 3,937+; United States: 1,822; Others: 2,115; Wounded: 15,000+; Total killed: 73,020+	Taliban: 52,893+ killed (estimate, no official data)

The Taliban insurgency began after the group's fall from power during the 2001 war in Afghanistan. The Taliban forces fought against the Afghan government, led by President Hamid Karzai, and later by President Ashraf Ghani, and against a United States-led coalition of forces that has included all members of NATO; the 2021 Taliban offensive resulted in the collapse of the government of Ashraf Ghani. Pakistan extended financial and military aid to the Taliban.

The insurgency had spread to some degree over the border to neighboring Pakistan, in particular Khyber Pakhtunkhwa. The Taliban conducted warfare against Afghan National Security Forces and their NATO allies, as well as against civilian targets. Regional powers, particularly Pakistan, Iran, China and Russia, were often accused of funding and supporting the insurgent groups.

The allied Haqqani Network, Hezb-e Islami Gulbuddin (until 2016), and smaller al-Qaeda groups had also been part of the Taliban insurgency.

== Background ==
Following the United States invasion of Afghanistan in 2001, the Taliban was defeated and many Taliban fighters left the movement or retreated to sanctuaries in the country of Pakistan. In May and June 2003, high-ranking Taliban officials proclaimed that the Taliban regrouped and were ready to wage a guerrilla war in order to expel US forces from Afghanistan. Omar assigned five operational zones to Taliban commanders such as Dadullah Akhund. Dadullah took charge in Zabul province.

In late 2004, the then hidden Taliban leader Mohammed Omar announced that the Taliban were launching an insurgency against "America and its puppets" (i.e. transitional Afghan government forces) in order to "regain the sovereignty of our country".

The Taliban spent several years regrouping, and launched a re-escalation of the insurgency campaign in 2006.

== Organization ==
As of 2018, the Taliban was composed of four different shuras, or representative councils. The first is the Quetta Shura. Two smaller shuras are subordinated to it, the Haqqani network (also known as the Miran Shah Shura) and the Peshawar Shura. The Peshawar Shura was established in March 2005, and is based in eastern Afghanistan. The majority of its fighters are former members of the Hezb-e Islami Gulbuddin. The Haqqani network declared its autonomy from the Quetta Shura in 2007, and rejoined in August 2015. The Peshawar Shura was autonomous from 2009 until 2016.

The second autonomous shura is the Shura of the North, based in Badakhshan Province. The third is the Mashhad Shura, sponsored by Iran, and the fourth is the Rasool Shura, led by Muhammad Rasul and also known as the High Council of the Islamic Emirate.

=== Finances ===
While the pre-2001 Taliban suppressed opium production, the insurgency "relies on opium revenues to purchase weapons, train its members, and buy support." In 2001, Afghanistan produced only 11% of the world's opium. Today it produces over 80% of the global crop, and the drug trade accounts for half of Afghanistan's GDP. However, later estimates show that drugs might not be the major source of income of the Taliban. Taxation and mineral sales under the group's shadow governments since 2001 have also been major sources.

On 28 July 2009, Richard Holbrooke, the United States special envoy for Afghanistan and Pakistan, said that money transfers from Western Europe and the Gulf States exceeded the drug trade earnings and that a new task force had been formed to shut down this source of funds.

The United States Agency for International Development is investigating the possibility that kickbacks from its contracts are being funneled to the Taliban.

A report by the London School of Economics (LSE) claimed to provide the most concrete evidence yet that the Pakistani intelligence agency ISI is providing funding, training and sanctuary to the Taliban on a scale much larger than previously thought. The report's author Matt Waldman spoke to nine Taliban field commanders in Afghanistan and concluded that Pakistan's relationship with the insurgents ran far deeper than previously realized. Some of those interviewed suggested that the organization even attended meetings of the Taliban's supreme council, the Quetta Shura. A spokesman for the Pakistani military dismissed the report, describing it as "malicious". Pakistan's armed forces and intelligence services, most notably the Inter-Services Intelligence Directorate (ISI), play a significant role in bolstering the operational capabilities of the Taliban, resulting in their emergence as a formidable military entity.

== Foreign support for the Taliban ==
=== Pakistan ===
The Taliban's victory was facilitated in support from Pakistan. Although Pakistan was a major US ally before and after the 2001 invasion of Afghanistan, elements of the Pakistan government (including the military and intelligence services) have for decades maintained strong logistical and tactical ties with Taliban militants, and this support helped support the insurgency in Afghanistan. For example, the Haqqani Network, a Taliban affiliate based in Pakistan, had strong support from Inter-Services Intelligence (ISI), the Pakistan intelligence agency. Taliban leaders found a safe haven in Pakistan, lived in the country, transacted business and earned funds there, and received medical treatment there. Some elements of the Pakistani establishment sympathized with Taliban ideology, and many Pakistan officials considered the Taliban as an asset against India.

In 2007, Pakistan's former President Pervez Musharraf admitted Taliban getting cross-border aid and said that "There is no doubt Afghan militants are supported from Pakistan soil. The problem that you have in your region is because support is provided from our side."

Pakistan's former Interior minister Sheikh Rasheed Ahmad on 1 September 2021, said in an interview with Hum News that "All top Taliban leaders were born and brought up in Pakistan. This has been our 'service' that we trained them and many more might be studying." Later on 29 September 2021, he denied Pakistan gave any military support to the Taliban and further claimed "US is accusing us that we facilitated Taliban but we only facilitated them to bring them to the table at the request of US".

Dr. Antonio Giustozzi, a senior research fellow at Royal United Services Institute on terrorism and conflict, interviewed Taliban fighters who attested of Pakistani support. "Our Punjabi trainers work very hard and always find a solution when the enemies use new tactics against us." Such training from Pakistani advisers allowed the Taliban fighters to respond to changes in enemy tactics by shifting toward ambushes, suicide attacks, and IED use. Another interviewee asked "What could the Taliban do without these foreigners? It is the foreigners who give the Taliban weapons, advice and support", and there were "up to fifteen to twenty 'Punjabi' trainers in some districts."

=== Russia and Iran ===
Dr. Antonio Giustozzi wrote, "Both the Russians and the Iranians helped the Taliban advance at a breakneck pace in May–August 2021. They contributed to funding and equipping them, but perhaps even more importantly they helped them by brokering deals with parties, groups and personalities close to either country, or even both. [...] The Revolutionary Guards helped the Taliban's advance in western Afghanistan, including by lobbying various strongmen and militia commanders linked to Iran not to resist the Taliban."

== 2002–2006 Taliban insurgency re-grouping period ==
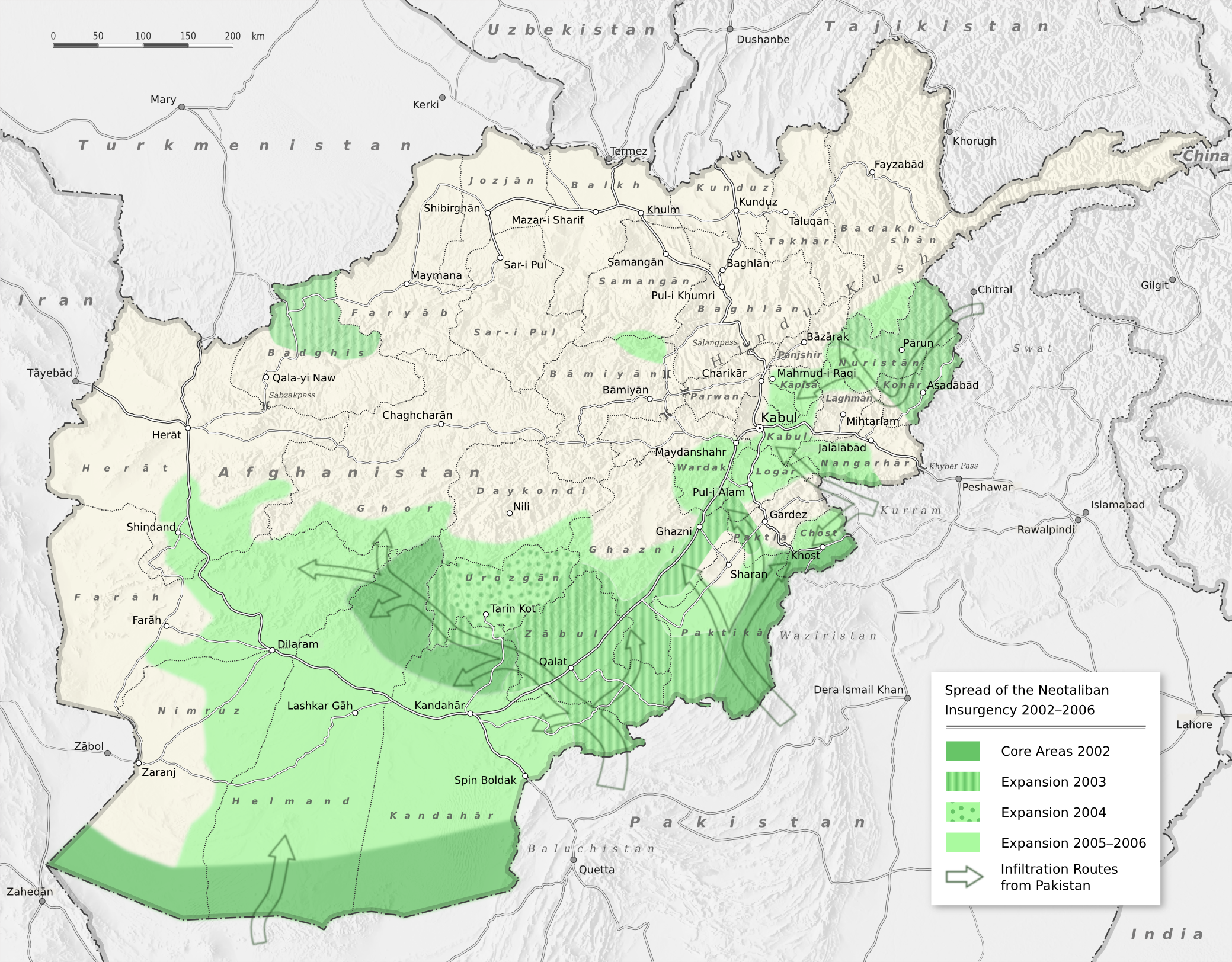
Map detailing the spread of the Taliban-insurgency in Afghanistan 2002–2006

Following the Battle of Tora Bora, the Taliban was defeated and many Taliban fighters left the movement or retreated to sanctuaries in Pakistan, where they began the initial stages of re-grouping.

Pamphlets by Taliban and other groups turned up strewn in towns and the countryside in early 2003, urging Islamic faithful to rise up against US forces and other foreign soldiers in holy war. On 27 January 2003, during Operation Mongoose (War in Afghanistan), a band of fighters were assaulted by US forces at the Adi Ghar cave complex 25 km (15 mi) north of Spin Boldak. Eighteen rebels were reported killed with no US casualties. The site was suspected to be a base for supplies and fighters coming from Pakistan. The first isolated attacks by relatively large Taliban bands on Afghan targets also appeared around that time.

In May 2003, the Taliban Supreme Court's chief justice, Abdul Salam, proclaimed that the Taliban were back, regrouped, rearmed, and ready for guerrilla war to expel US forces from Afghanistan. Omar assigned five operational zones to Taliban commanders such as Dadullah, who took charge in Zabul province.

Small mobile Taliban training camps were established along the border to train recruits in guerrilla warfare, according to senior Taliban warrior Mullah Malang in June 2003. Most were drawn from tribal area madrassas in Pakistan. Bases, a few with as many as 200 fighters, emerged in the tribal areas by the summer of 2003. Pakistani will to prevent infiltration was uncertain, while Pakistani military operations proved of little use.

As the summer of 2003 continued, Taliban attacks gradually increased in frequency. Dozens of Afghan government soldiers, NGO humanitarian workers, and several US soldiers died in the raids, ambushes and rocket attacks. Besides guerrilla attacks, Taliban fighters began building up forces in the district of Dai Chopan in Zabul Province. The Taliban decided to make a stand there. Over the course of the summer, up to 1,000 guerrillas moved there. Over 220 people, including several dozen Afghan police, were killed in August 2003.

Operation Valiant Strike was a major United States military ground operation in Afghanistan announced on 19 March 2003 that involved 2nd and 3rd battalions of 504th Parachute Infantry Regiment, Romanian and Afghan troops. The combined forces moved through Kandahar and parts of Southern Afghanistan with the objective of eliminating Taliban enemy forces and weapons caches while also attempting to gather intelligence on Taliban activity in the area. At the conclusion of the operation on 24 March 2003, coalition forces had detained 13 suspected Taliban fighters and confiscated more than 170 rocket-propelled grenades, 180 land mines, 20 automatic rifles and machine guns, as well as many rockets, rifles, and launchers.

United States led-coalition forces carried out Operation Asbury Park on 2 June 2004, and 17 June 2004, of taskforce 1/6 BLT of the 22nd Marine Expeditionary Unit engaged in fighting with Taliban and other anti-coalition forces in both Oruzgan Province and Zabul Province culminating in the Dai Chopan region of Afghanistan. This operation was characterized by atypical fighting on the side of the tactics of the Taliban and the other guerillas encountered. culminating in a large battle on 8 June. During Asbury Park, the 22nd Marine Expeditionary Unit was faced with an opponent that frequently would dig in and engage the Marine forces, rather than the traditional hit and run (or "asymmetric attack") methods. As such, Marines, with the aid of B-1B Lancer, A-10 Warthog, and AH-64 Apache aircraft, engaged in "pitched battles each day," culminating in a large battle on 8 June. The last of the fighting which took place near Dai Chopan on 8 June was decisive in that enemy forces were depleted to such an extent that no further contact was made with the enemy for the duration of the operation. What was meant by the enemy to be a three pronged attack 8 June 2004 resulted in over eighty-five confirmed kills, with estimates well in excess of 100 enemy dead, an estimated 200–300 wounded, with dozens captured. While throughout the entire operation a "handful" of US forces and Afghan Militia were injured.

In late 2004, the then hidden Taliban leader Mohammed Omar announced an insurgency against "America and its puppets" (i.e. transitional Afghan government forces) to "regain the sovereignty of our country".

In late June through mid-July 2005, United States Navy Seals carried out Operation Red Wings as a combined / joint military operation in the Pech District of Afghanistan's Kunar Province, on the slopes of a mountain named Sawtalo Sar, approximately 20 miles (32 km) west of Kunar's provincial capital of Asadabad, . Operation Red Wings was intended to disrupt local Taliban anti-coalition militia (ACM) activity, thus contributing to regional stability and thereby facilitating the Afghan Parliament elections scheduled for September 2005. At the time, Taliban anti-coalition militia activity in the region was carried out most notably by a small group, led by a local man from Nangarhar Province, Ahmad Shah, who had aspirations of regional Islamic fundamentalist prominence. He and his small group were among the primary targets of the operation.

In between 13 and 18 August 2005, United States Marine Corps carried out a military operation, called Operation Whalers that took place in Afghanistan's Kunar Province, just weeks after the disastrous Operation Red Wings. Like Operation Red Wings, the objective of Operation Whalers was the disruption of Taliban Anti-Coalition Militia (ACM) activity in the region in support of further stabilizing the region for unencumbered voter turnout for the 18 September 2005 Afghan National Parliamentary Elections. Operation Whalers was planned and executed by the 2nd Battalion of the 3rd Marine Regiment (2/3). The emphasis of the operation was an Anti-Coalition Militia cell led by Ahmad Shah, which was one of 22 identified ACM groups operating in the region at that time, and was the most active. Ahmad Shah's cell was responsible for the Navy SEAL ambush and subsequent MH-47 shootdown that killed, in total, 19 US special operations personnel during Operation Red Wings. Operation Whalers, named after the Hartford / New England Whalers professional hockey team, was the "sequel" to Operation Red Wings in that it was aimed at furthering stabilization of the security situation in the restive Kunar Province of Eastern Afghanistan, a long-term goal of American and coalition forces operating in the area at that time. Operation Whalers, conducted by a number of Marine infantry companies of 2/3 with attached Afghan National Army soldiers and supported by conventional Army aviation, intelligence, and combat arms forces units and US Air Force aviation assets, proved a success. Taliban Anti-Coalition Militia activity dropped substantially and subsequent human intelligence and signals intelligence revealed that Ahmad Shah had been seriously wounded. Shah, who sought to disrupt the 18 September 2005 Afghan National Parliamentary Elections, was not able to undertake any significant Taliban Anti-Coalition operations subsequent to Operation Whalers in Kunar or neighboring provinces.

== 2006 escalation ==
In 2006, Afghanistan began facing a wave of attacks by improvised explosives and suicide bombers, particularly after NATO took command of the fight against insurgents in spring 2006.

Afghan President Hamid Karzai publicly condemned the methods used by the western powers. In June 2006 he said:

And for two years I have systematically, consistently and on a daily basis warned the international community of what was developing in Afghanistan and of the need for a change of approach in this regard... The international community [must] reassess the manner in which this war against terror is conducted

Insurgents were also criticized for their conduct. According to Human Rights Watch, bombing and other attacks on Afghan civilians by the Taliban (and to a lesser extent Hezb-e-Islami Gulbuddin), are reported to have "sharply escalated in 2006" with "at least 669 Afghan civilians were killed in at least 350 armed attacks, most of which appear to have been intentionally launched at civilians or civilian objects." 131 of insurgent attacks were suicide attacks which killed 212 civilians (732 wounded), 46 Afghan army and police members (101 wounded), and 12 foreign soldiers (63 wounded).

The United Nations estimated that for the first half of 2011, the civilian deaths rose by 15% and reached 1462, which is the worst death toll since the beginning of the war and despite the surge of foreign troops.

=== Timeline ===
- June:
  - 6 June: A roadside bombing leaves 2 American soldiers killed, the attack took place in the province of Nangarhar. Also a separate suicide bombing in Khost leaves three US soldiers wounded.
  - 15 June: A bus carrying workers to an American base explodes killing 10 and wounding 15. The explosives were placed on the bus.
- July:
  - 1 July: 2 British soldiers are killed when their base came under small arms fire including rocket propelled grenades.
- August:
  - 8 August: 4 Canadian NATO soldiers are killed in two separate attacks. And a suicide bomber targeting a NATO convoy detonated, killing 21 people.
  - 20 August: 3 American soldiers are killed and another 3 are wounded in a battle with Taliban militants after a roadside bomb hit an American patrol.
- September:
  - 8 September: A major suicide car bombing near the US embassy in Kabul kills 18 including 2 US soldiers.
  - 10 September: The governor of Afghanistan's southeastern Paktia province is killed alongside his bodyguard and nephew when a suicide bomber detonates himself beside the governor's car.
- October:
  - 14 October: A suicide attack in Kandahar city leaves 8 dead including one NATO soldier.
  - 15 October: 2 Canadian soldiers were killed when Taliban militants attacked NATO troops using small arms fire and rocket propelled grenades.
- December:
  - 6 December: A suicide bomber blew himself up outside a security contractor's office killing 7 including 2 Americans, the attack took place south of Afghanistan in Kandahar.
  - 19 December: Mullah Akhtar Muhammad Osmani, reportedly number 4 in the Taliban shura, is killed by an American airstrike in southern Afghanistan.

== 2007 ==
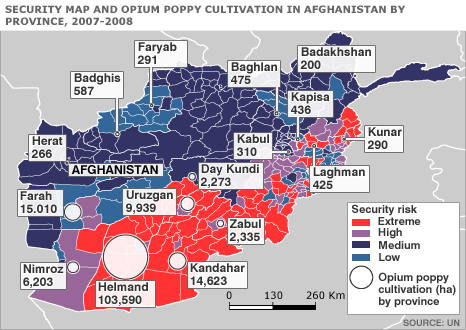
Regional security risks and levels of opium poppy cultivation in 2007–2008.

- The Taliban continued to favor suicide bombing as a tactic.
  - In 2007 Afghanistan saw 140 more suicide bombings – more than in the past five years combined – that killed more than 300 people, many of whom were civilians.
  - A UN report said the perpetrators were poorly educated, disaffected young men who were recruited by Taliban leaders in Pakistani madrassas.
- Western analysts estimated that the Taliban can field about 10,000 fighters at any given time, according to a 30 October report in The New York Times. Of that number, "only 2,000 to 3,000 are highly motivated, full-time insurgents", the Times reported. The rest are part-timers, made up of alienated, young Afghan men angry at bombing raids or fighting in order to get money. In 2007, more foreign fighters were showing up in Afghanistan than ever before, according to Afghan and United States officials. An estimated 100 to 300 full-time combatants are foreigners, usually from Pakistan, Uzbekistan, Chechnya, various Arab countries and perhaps even Turkey and western China. They tend to be more fanatical and violent, and they often bring skills such as the ability to post more sophisticated videos on the Internet or bombmaking expertise. It has also been reported that the Taliban now control up to 54% of Afghanistan.
- On 15 April, the Afghan Government promised to end all hostage deals with the Taliban after two Afghan kidnapped victims were executed in an agreement to free an Italian journalist.

=== Timeline ===
- January:
  - 23 January: A suicide bomber blew himself up outside a US base in eastern Afghanistan, killing 10 people who were waiting outside the base.
- February:
  - 2 February: Taliban forces raided a southern Afghan town, destroying the government center and briefly holding some elders captive.
  - 19 February: The Taliban briefly seized a small town in western Afghanistan after police fled the town, the Taliban forces moved in for 30 minutes and seized three vehicles.
  - 20 February: A suicide bomber blew himself up during an opening hospital ceremony injuring 2 NATO soldiers and a hospital worker.
  - 27 February: 23 people were killed when a suicide bomber attacked an American military base, Bagram Airfield (BAF), in Bagram District, Parwan Province. The attack took place while US vice president Dick Cheney was in the compound. Cheney was unhurt and was the intended target of the attack as claimed by the Taliban. The dead included an American soldier, a Korean soldier, and an American contractor.
- March:
  - 4 March: A suicide bomber attacked an American convoy which left 16 civilians dead in the aftermath as the American convey begins to sporadically fire at civilian cars around them. In a separate incident, two British soldiers were killed when a Taliban rocket was fired on them during clashes in Southern Helmand Province.
  - 17 March: A suicide bomber targeting a Canadian military convoy left one dead and three injured, including one NATO soldier. The attack took place in Kandahar.
  - 19 March: A car bomb blew up near a three-vehicle US embassy convoy injuring many in the convoy.
  - 27 March: Four police officers were killed in the southern Helmand Province after a suicide bomber blew himself up outside a police station.
  - 29 March: A suicide bomber near Kabul detonated explosives close to a high-ranking Afghan intelligence official's car, killing 4 civilians.
- April:
  - 6 April: Karzai said that he spoke to the Taliban to bring about peace in Afghanistan. He noted that the Afghan Taliban are "always welcome" in Afghanistan, although foreign militants are not.
  - 9 April: Six Canadian soldiers were killed in southern Afghanistan when they struck a roadside bomb. A separate roadside bombing, also in south Afghanistan, left another NATO soldier dead and one wounded. In another incident, a statement from the Taliban's spokesperson claimed that they had beheaded a translator for a kidnapped Italian journalist.
  - 15 April: A suicide bomber struck a US-private security firm, killing four Afghans working for the company.
  - 16 April: A suicide bomber ran onto a police training field and detonated his explosive device, killed 10 police officers and wounded dozens of others. The attack took place in the relatively quiet city of Kunduz. The Taliban claimed responsibility for the attack.
  - 20 April: Separate explosions in Southern Afghanistan leave two NATO soldiers dead.
  - 22 April: A suicide bomber blew himself up in an eastern city of Afghanistan, killing six. A roadside bomb also hit an Afghan intelligence service vehicle, killing all four who were inside.
  - 30 April: Hundreds of Afghans took to the streets in western Afghanistan, accusing US soldiers of killing scores of civilians in fighting which the coalition said killed 136 Taliban in a three-week operation.
- May:
  - 13 May: Mullah Dadullah, the Taliban's top military commander in Afghanistan, was killed in fighting in the south.
  - 23 May: The Taliban's newly named top field commander, Mullah Bakht Mohammed, brother and replacement of deceased field commander Mullah Dadullah, made his first public statement, saying the Taliban will "pursue holy war until the occupying countries leave."
- July:
  - 19 July: The South Korean hostage crisis involved the hostage taking by the Taliban of twenty-three South Korean Christian aid workers in Ghazni Province. The Taliban killed two hostages later that month. The crisis ended on 30 August with the release of the remaining hostages as part of a deal with South Korean government diplomats.
- August:
  - 31 August: A suicide bomber detonated his explosive-laden vehicle after ramming three military vehicles at the military gate of Kabul International Airport. Two Afghan soldiers were killed and ten people were injured.
- September:
  - 29 September: In an effort to reach a compromise with the Taliban leaders, Karzai suggested quid quo pro by allowing militants to have a place in government if they stopped fighting. Taliban leaders replied by saying there would be no compromise unless intervening forces such as NATO and the US left.
- November:
  - 2 November: Mawlawi Abdul Manan, an important Taliban figure, was killed by Afghan Security forces. His death was confirmed by the Taliban.

== 2008 ==
The US warned that in 2008 the Taliban has "coalesced into a resilient insurgency", and would "maintain or even increase the scope and pace of its terrorist attacks". Attacks by Taliban insurgents in eastern Afghanistan increased by 40% when compared to the same period in 2007.

=== Timeline ===
- February
  - 24 February: Poor military intelligence leads to conflicted reports of a possible Taliban spring offensive.
- August
  - 19 August: Taliban forces kill 9 French troops (with a 10th death in an accident) near Kabul.
- October
  - 6 October: CNN reported that, via Saudi intermediaries, the Taliban is negotiating to end the conflict in Afghanistan, and that the Taliban has split from Al Qaeda.
- December:
  - 7 December: 200 Taliban armed with RPGs and automatic weapons attack two NATO supply depots outside of Peshawar destroying 100 vehicles packed with supplies intended to support the NATO effort in Afghanistan.
  - 8 December: 200 Taliban armed with RPGs and automatic weapons attack a NATO supply depot outside of Peshawar destroying 53 container trucks packed with supplies intended to support the NATO effort in Afghanistan.

== 2009 ==
During 2009 the Taliban regained control over the countryside of several Afghan provinces. In August 2009, Taliban commanders in the province of Helmand started issuing "visa" from the "Islamic Emirate of Afghanistan" in order to allow travel to and from the provincial capital of Lashkar Gah.

=== Timeline ===
- June:
  - 30 June: US Army Private First Class soldier Bowe R. Bergdahl is captured by the Taliban in Southern Afghanistan.
- July:
  - 18 July: The Taliban release a video showing Bergdahl being interviewed by one of his captors.
- August:
  - 12 August: Taliban spokesmen threaten the public not to vote in the upcoming presidential elections.
  - 15 August: 2009 NATO Afghanistan headquarters bombing:
    - A suicide car bomb explodes outside NATO headquarters in Kabul, killing at least seven and wounding almost 100. ISAF troops were reported among the wounded.
  - 25 August: A massive car bomb shakes Kandahar, killing at least 30 and wounding dozens as buildings collapse in the city's center. The attack comes after the first results of the presidential elections were announced. Four US soldiers die in an IED explosion in southern Afghanistan bringing ISAF losses to 295, eclipsing 2008's coalition death toll of 294.
- September:
  - 4 September: US airstrike on two fuel tankers kill at least 70 people in Farah Province after it was hijacked by Taliban militants. Angry relatives of those killed claim civilians were collecting fuel from the tankers when the airstrike came.
- December:
  - On 1 December, US President Barack Obama announced that he would send an additional 30,000 troops to help battle the Taliban insurgency. The Taliban reacted to the President's speech by saying they will step up their fight in Afghanistan. A Taliban commander told the BBC that if more US troops came, more would die.
  - After his disputed re-election, President Hamid Karzai announced to move ahead with a plan for a Loya Jirga to discuss the Taliban insurgency. The Taliban would be invited to take part in this Jirga.

== 2010 ==
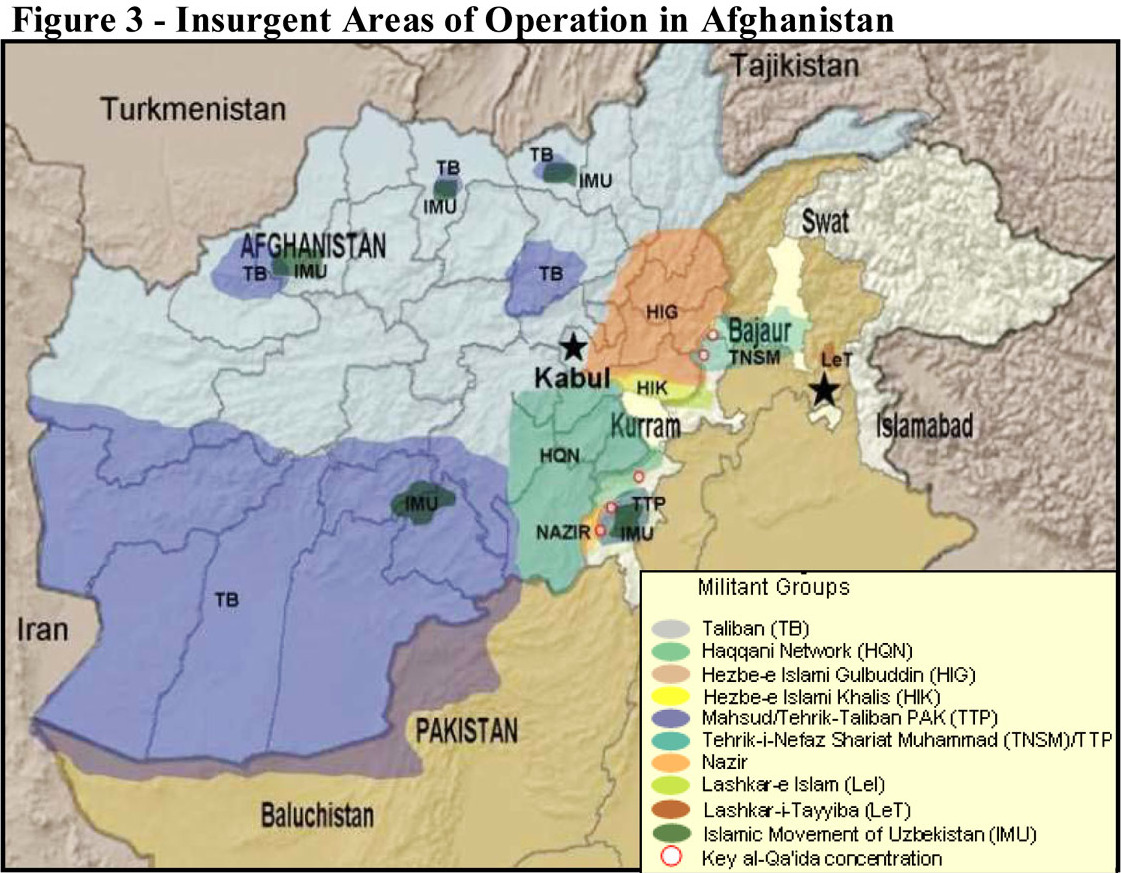
Insurgent regions in Afghanistan and border regions of Pakistan, as of 2010

During 2010, the Taliban were ousted from parts of Helmand Province by the ISAF Operation Moshtarak that started in February 2010. In the meantime the Taliban insurgency spread to the northern provinces of the country. The new policy of the Taliban was to shift militants from the south to the north, to show they exist "everywhere", according to Faryab Province Governor Abdul Haq Shafaq. With most Afghan and NATO troops stationed in the southern and eastern provinces, villagers in the once-peaceful north found themselves confronted with a rapid deterioration of security, as insurgents seized new territory in provinces such as Kunduz and Baghlan, and even infiltrated the mountains of Badakhshan Province in the northeast.

=== Timeline ===
- January:
  - 17 January: "Kabul's day of terror":
    - On this day, gunbattles near the presidential palace and other government buildings paralyzed the Afghan capital for hours.
    - As President Karzai was swearing in his new cabinet ministers inside the presidential palace, militants performed attacks on multiple locations in Kabul, including shopping malls, a cinema and the central bank. A team of gunmen launched a spectacular assault in "commando style" with two men detonating suicide bombs and the rest fighting to the death near the gates of the presidential palace, an operation by insurgents to terrorize the Afghan capital, further demoralizing the population and lending to the impression that virtually no part of the country could be safe. The Taliban said it had deployed 20 suicide bombers in explosive vests who were also armed with heavy and light weaponry
    - A western security official estimated there is a security incident in Kabul, on average, every seven to 10 days.
- February:
  - 26 February: Militants target hotels and guest houses in Kabul. Up to nine Indians, an Italian diplomat and a French film maker were among the dead in the worst assault on the Afghan capital for several months. A four-hour battle began with a car bombing and included suicide bombers and Taliban fighters throwing grenades. The attacks appeared to be aimed at Indian government officials and medical workers. Three Afghan police were killed, and six more officers were among the 38 people wounded in what was described as a well-planned and co-ordinated attack.
- June:
  - 2–4 June:
  - The Karzai administration organized the Afghan Peace Jirga in Kabul that was announced after the 2009 presidential elections. The Taliban were not invited.
- July:
  - 20–29 July: International Conference on Afghanistan in Kabul
- August:
  - 6 August: killing of 10 members of a Christian charity's medical team in the mountains of Badakhshan.
  - 10 August: Amnesty International states that the International Criminal Court should open a formal investigation into crimes committed by the Taliban and other insurgent groups in Afghanistan.

== 2011 ==
The insurgency continued strongly in 2011.

=== Timeline ===
The Taliban continued attacking and ambushing NATO and Afghan troops as well as the targeted assassination of government officials.

- January:
  - 29 January: The deputy governor of Kandahar was killed in a suicide attack. Three months later, on 15 April the Kandahar chief police, General Khan Mohammed Mujahid was killed.
- April:
  - It was reported that in 2011, the United States was spending 2 billion dollars per week fighting in Afghanistan against the Taliban. In a 2011 forecast the war in Afghanistan was estimated at 108 billion dollars for the year, while the Iraqi War was estimated at 50 billion.
- May:
  - 28 May: The Taliban assassinated one of their main opponents, Mohammed Daud, in a bomb attack. Six others were also killed. He was the chief of the police for the northern of Afghanistan.
- July:
  - 18 July: President Karzai's advisor, Jan Mohammad Khan, was assassinated in Kabul by the Taliban in an attack that also killed an Afghan deputy.
  - As of 18 July, coalition forces started their plan of transition by handing power of several areas to the Afghan authority following their plan of future pull out of the country. A Taliban militant who had infiltrated the Afghan police force killed seven other policemen in Lashkar Gah. The same day the police chief of Registaan district and three other policemen were killed in bomb attacks.
  - As of 22 July 325 coalition fighters were killed, more than 55% of the deaths caused by IED's.
  - 19 July: ISAF General Chief David Petraeus left his position with mixed results. During his time as the head of ISAF, 3775 insurgents were killed or captured in 2832 raids while 713 NATO soldiers were killed. Overall the level of violence in the country increased. He was replaced by General John Allen.
  - Between 20 and 22 July, NATO troops killed 50 Haqquani fighters in an attack on their camp.
  - 24 July: A US military investigation discovered that a portion of the 2 billion dollars in funds given by the United States in contracts had fallen in the hands of the insurgency.
  - 27 July: The mayor of Kandahar, Ghulam Haidar Hameedi, was killed in a suicide attack.
  - 28 July: Suicide bombers and snipers attacked the police headquarters of Tarin Kowt in a large-scale attack which killed more than 21 people including Afghan reporter Ahmed Omed Khpulwak. According to the Afghan interior minister, for the 2-year period between 19 March 2009 and 19 March 2011, 2770 Afghan policemen were killed and 4785 wounded while 1052 Afghan soldiers were killed and 2413 wounded.
- 31 July: 10 Afghan policemen were killed in a suicide attack in Lashkar Gah where Afghan security forces had taken over from NATO a week before. The same day, 10 Afghan guards who were protecting a NATO supplies convoy were killed in the attack. One day before, 5 Afghans soldiers and 2 NATO soldiers were killed in a bomb attack on their patrol.
- August:
  - 6 August: 31 American Special Forces soldiers were killed in the crash of their helicopter probably shot down during a fight with the Taliban. Seven Afghan soldiers were also killed. This was the biggest death toll for NATO troops in the whole war. Most of the American soldiers killed were Navy SEALs.
  - 7 August: 4 NATO soldiers were killed, including two French Foreign Legion members, and 5 others were wounded.

== 2012 ==
The Taliban insurgency continued into 2012.

=== Timeline ===
- August:
  - 27 August:
    - Taliban insurgents in the Taliban-controlled southern Helmand area killed 17 civilians – fifteen men and two women – who were attending a party. A government official said that the victims were beheaded for celebrating with music and mixgender dancing in the Musa Qala district of Helmand, which ran contrary to the Taliban's extreme brand of Islam. Later, however, a provincial government official said that the 17 people killed were due to a fight between two Taliban commanders over two women (who were also killed). The civilians were either beheaded or had their throats cut, but some showed signs of gunshot wounds or beatings.
      - The attacks were condemned by Afghanistan President Hamid Karzai, who ordered an investigation into the attack, the leader of the NATO coalition led by the United States, the United Nations, and the European Union. However, the Taliban has denied responsibility for the attack, saying that no Taliban members have ever killed civilians.
      - The attack occurred on the same day when two United States troops were killed by an Afghan soldier.
    - 10 Afghan soldiers were killed by the Taliban, also in the Helmand province.

== 2013 ==
=== January ===
- 6 January – Suicide bombers kill four in an attack in Spin Boldak.
- 16 January – The Afghan National Directorate of Security headquarters in Kabul are attacked by a team of suicide bombers, leaving a security guard dead and 17 others injured.
- 26 January – A suicide bombing at a market in Kunduz kills at least ten people and wounds up to twenty others.
- 27 January – At least twenty members of the Afghan National Police have been killed in bomb attacks over the past day with eight police officers killed in the latest attack in Kandahar.

=== February ===
- 24 February
  - Two guards and an Afghan police officer are killed in coordinated suicide bombing attacks in Jalalabad and Logar Province in eastern Afghanistan, while a third such attack on the National Directorate of Security in Kabul is foiled.
- 27 February – Taliban insurgents kill 17 Afghan government-affiliated militia personnel in an overnight attack in Andar District of eastern Ghazni Province.

=== March ===
- 11 March – Two US and three Afghan soldiers are killed in Wardak Province in the latest insider attack against coalition forces. In a separate incident, two Afghan civilians are shot dead by American soldiers after failing to stop at a checkpoint near Kabul.
- 13 March – A suicide bomber kills 10 spectators, including the district police chief, during a local gaming event in Kunduz province of northern Afghanistan.
- 26 March
  - A suicide attack on a police station in Jalalabad, kills five police officers while seven attackers die.
  - One British soldier is killed and nine are wounded by Taliban insurgents in an attack on a patrol base with a truck bomb and small arms fire in Helmand Province, Nad Ali District.

=== April ===
- 3 April – more than 46 people are killed and more than 100 injured following an attack by Taliban militants armed with suicide vests on a courthouse in Farah.
- Taliban gunmen and bombers attacked Farah, killing 34 civilians and 10 members of the security forces. Nine attackers were killed.
- 5 April – An explosive-laden donkey is used in an attack on a police security post in the Alingar District of Laghman Province in eastern Afghanistan, killing a policeman and wounding three civilians.
- 6 April – A bombing in Qalat, capital of the southern Kabul Province, kills three U.S. soldiers and two U.S. civilians, along with an Afghan doctor. An American civilian dies in another attack in the east of the country.
- 8 April
  - Taliban fighters are suspected of being responsible for a bus explosion that kills at least nine people and injures more than twenty others in Maidan Wardak Province.
- 12 April – Thirteen soldiers of the Afghan National Army are killed and one is injured in an ambush in the eastern Kunar Province.
- 22–11 April people are kidnapped in Afghanistan after the helicopter they were in was forced to land. The Taliban takes responsibility for the abductions.
- 26 April – Six police officers are poisoned and fatally shot in Kunduz Province while another one is missing.
- 26 April – At least 30 people die in southern Afghanistan after a bus crashes into the wreckage of a truck attacked by Taliban insurgents.
- 29 April – A Boeing 747 crashes near an American military base in Bagram, killing all seven American crew members on board.
- 30 April – A roadside bomb kills three members of NATO's ISAF force in Afghanistan.

=== May ===
- 4 May – Five US soldiers are killed when a bomb detonates in Kandahar. Additionally, three more soldiers are killed in separate incidents. In Farah Province two US Marines and a military working dog are killed in an insider attack by a member of the ANA.
- 6 May – An Afghan border police guard is killed and two Pakistani troops are injured in border violence.
- 13 May – Three Georgian soldiers are killed and several wounded in a large-scale insurgent attack on an ISAF base in the Helmand Province.
- 14 May – The Taliban kills four US soldiers in Kandahar Province.
- 16 May – A suicide bomber killed 15 people including two US soldiers and four NATO employees in Kabul. The explosion also wounded 39 people.
- 24 May – Afghan security forces battle Taliban insurgents in central Kabul. An Afghan policeman, a Nepalese soldier, and numerous insurgents are killed.

=== June ===
- 2 June – Taliban insurgents attack two checkpoints in the Kamdesh District in eastern Afghanistan killing four Afghan police officers.
- 3 June – A suicide bombing in eastern Afghanistan kills at least 20 people, including 10 children.
- 6 June – Seven Georgian servicemen are killed and nine wounded in an insurgent attack with a truck bomb on the ISAF base in Shir Ghazay.
- 8 June
  - In Afghanistan, a man wearing an Afghan military uniform attacks and kills three American soldiers, in what appears to be an insider attack on U.S. International Security Assistance Force soldiers, based in east Afghanistan's Paktika Province.
  - In a separate unrelated incident, an Italian soldier is killed and three are wounded when a child throws a grenade at a NATO convoy in west Afghanistan's Farah Province.
- 10 June – Seven heavily armed Taliban militants launch a coordinated attack near the main international airport of Kabul and seize a five-story building under construction nearby. Afghan security forces retake the building, killing all seven militants and sustaining no military or civilian casualties.
- 11 June – A bomb detonates near the Afghan Supreme Court killing eight people and wounding dozens.
- On 11 June in Kabul, a Taliban suicide car bomber killed 16 people.
- 18 June
  - A bomb explodes in Kabul killing three people and wounding six.
  - Four United States troops are killed near Bagram Airfield.
- 25 June – Taliban forces attack near the Presidential Palace in Kabul.
- On 25 June, Gunmen and bombers killed three security guards. On the same day the Taliban attacked the presidential palace, about seven or eight explosions happened and eight attackers were killed.

=== July ===
- 2 July – Militants attack NATO headquarters in the north of Kabul resulting in at least two deaths.
- 9 July – Seventeen people are killed by a roadside bomb.
- 23 July – A bomb kills eight people in Awardak Province, including three United States Army soldiers, four Afghan National Army soldiers and an Afghan interpreter.

=== August ===
- 3 August – Nine children die in a suicide bombing near the Indian consulate in Jalalabad.
- 5 August – A bomb explodes at a market in Kandahar, killing at least four people.
- 8 August – A bomb explodes at a cemetery in Nangarhar Province, killing at least 14 people.
- 11 August – Three U.S. soldiers are killed in an attack in Paktia province.
- 17–10 August people are killed in a camp by insurgents in western Afghanistan.
- 23 August – A routine joint patrol composed of British paratroopers, US Marines and Afghan soldiers targeted a village to search for illegal weapons in Helmand Province. After insertion by a Chinook helicopter, the patrol was ambushed by the Taliban, the resulting skirmish lasted approximately 45 minutes which killed 11 insurgents and wounded four more, a US Marine officer was also wounded, one soldier was awarded the Victoria Cross.

=== September ===
- 8 September – The Taliban kills four Afghan National Army troops in an attack on an intelligence office near Kabul.
- 13 September – Taliban insurgents attack the United States consulate in Herat, with two members of the Afghan National Police reported as killed and about 20 civilians injured.
- On 13 September, Taliban gunmen and bombers killed eight security guards and a policeman in Herat. All seven attackers were killed.

=== October ===
- 15 October – A bomb in a mosque in Logar Province kills the governor Arsala Jamal and results in other injuries.
- 27 October – A roadside bomb in eastern Afghanistan kills 18 people.

=== November ===
- 16 November – Suicide car bombing in Kabul kills six people and injures twenty.

=== December ===
- 23 December – Captain Richard Holloway of the Special Boat Service was killed by Taliban gunfire whilst on a joint SBS-Afghan forces raid (with air support) on Taliban insurgents in a valley east of Kabul, ahead of the Afghanistan elections.
- 27 December – A suicide bomber attacks a foreign military convoy on the eastern outskirts of Kabul, killing at least three foreign soldiers, police and the NATO-led International Security Assistance Force.

== 2014 ==
As the American troops began to depart, and the number of Taliban attacks increased, there was speculation that the Taliban were waiting for an American withdrawal before launching a major offensive.

=== January ===
- 6 January – A suicide car bomber detonates at a police checkpoint in Ghazni Province, killing three police officers.
- 8 January – A book released by former U.S. Defense Secretary Robert Gates criticizes President Barack Obama for his handling of the War in Afghanistan.
- 9 January – The government of Afghanistan announces the release of 72 Taliban fighters from jails, despite American objections that they pose a security threat.
- 11 January – A four-year-old Afghan boy is killed by U.S. troops.
- 17 January – Twenty-one people are killed in a suicide bombing attack on a Kabul restaurant.
- 26 January – A suicide bomber attacks an army bus in Kabul, killing two soldiers and two civilians.

=== February ===
- 10 February – A car bomb detonates in Kabul, killing two contractors working with ISAF.
- 18 February – A suicide bombing attack in Kabul kills at least two people.
- 24 February – Senior Taliban commander Asmatullah Shaheen Bhittani is killed in Khyber Pakhtunkhwa.

=== March ===
- 11 March – Gunmen in Kabul kill Swedish Radio foreign correspondent Nils Horner.
- 12 March – Three Taliban insurgents are killed by a team of Afghan police and private commandos after attacking a former National Directorate of Security headquarters in Kandahar. The Taliban claims they killed four commandos and five policemen, which police deny.
- 18 March – A suicide rickshaw bomber detonates in a marketplace in Maymana, killing 15 people and wounding dozens.
- 20 March –
  - Four suspected Taliban members attack the luxurious Kabul Serena Hotel, killing at least nine people, including four foreigners.
  - Suicide bombers attack a police station in the city of Jalalabad resulting in at least 11 deaths and 22 people being injured.

=== April ===
- 2 April – A suicide bomber wearing a military uniform strikes a voter registration office in Kabul, killing six police officers.
- 4 April – Two members of the Associated Press are shot by an Afghan wearing a police uniform in Khost. One of them, Pulitzer Prize winner and photojournalist Anja Niedringhaus, is killed. The other is seriously injured.

=== May ===
- 8 May – A roadside bomb near the Afghan border in North Waziristan, Pakistan, kills eight Pakistani soldiers.
- 21 May – The Taliban launch attacks in Badakhshan and Laghman provinces, killing 10 policemen and three civilians.
- 23 May – Gunmen attack the Indian consulate in Herat Province.

=== June ===
- 9 June – Five NATO International Security Assistance Force troops are killed in fighting the Taliban.

=== July ===
- 2 July – A suicide bomber attacks an Afghan National Army air force bus in Kabul killing at least five people.
- 8 July – The Taliban claims responsibility for an attack in central Afghanistan that claims the lives of 10 civilians, four Czech members of the International Security Assistance Force and two Afghan police officers.
- 12 July – A cross border attack by the Afghan Taliban kills three Pakistan Army soldiers in Bajaur Agency of the Federally Administered Tribal Areas.
- 15 July – A car bomb explodes at a market in the eastern Afghanistan province of Paktika, killing at least 89 people and injuring scores more in one of the deadliest attacks of the war.
- 17 July – Explosions and gunfire are reported near Kabul International Airport as militants temporarily capture a building under construction.
- 22 July – A Taliban suicide bomber blows himself up outside Kabul International Airport, killing three foreign advisers and an Afghan interpreter.
- 24 July – In Herat, two Finnish women working for a foreign aid organization are shot and killed.
- 25 July – Afghan insurgents killed 17 Shia civilians travelling from Kabul.
- 26 July – Insurgents stop minibuses in Ghōr Province and execute 14 Shiite Muslims.
- 29 July – A suicide bomber kills Hashmat Karzai, the cousin of the President of Afghanistan and a regional powerbroker, in the city of Kandahar.

=== August ===
- 5 August – A U.S. major general Harold J. Greene is killed, and a German brigadier general and several American troops are among the 15 wounded, in an attack by an Afghan soldier gunman – who was killed by Afghan soldiers – at Kabul's Marshal Fahim National Defense University.
- 14 August – A roadside bomb detonates next to a police car in Laghman Province, killing three police officers and injuring another four.
- 30 August – Taliban insurgents attack the National Directorate of Security building in Jalalabad resulting in at least six deaths.

=== September ===
- 8 September – A suicide bomb attack kills the police chief of southern Kandahar Province.
- 16 September – A large bomb explodes in Kabul resulting in the death of three international troops (including a U.S Army Major) and five injuries.
- 30 September – A double suicide attack killed seven people and wounded 21 others including Afghan soldiers in Kabul.

=== October ===
- 1 October – Taliban suicide bombers attack an Afghan National Army convoy in Kabul, killing at least seven people and injuring 19.
- 8 October – A suicide bomber kills at least four people and wounds 16 in Helmand province.
- 13 October – A Taliban attack killed 22 Afghan military in northern Afghanistan
- 21 October – A Kabul roadside bomb kills at least four Afghan National Security Force soldiers with six other soldiers and six civilians injured.

=== November ===
- 10 November – Ten policemen, including a commander, are killed by bomb blasts in Jalalabad and Logar Province.
- 13 December – Assassination of Atiqullah Raufi.
- 18 November – A suicide bomber attacks in Kabul and kills at least two people.
- 27 November – A suicide attack in Kabul killed six people including a Briton.

=== December ===
- 1 December – A suicide bomb kills at least nine, including two policemen, at a funeral for a tribal elder in Baghlan Province.
- 11 December – A Taliban suicide bomber kills at least six Afghan National Army soldiers in Tangi Tarakhil on the outskirts of Kabul.
- 13 December – Killings
  - Gunmen assassinate Atiqullah Rawoofi, the head of the Secretariat of the Supreme Court of Afghanistan, in the outskirts of Kabul.
  - Twenty-one people die in attacks across Afghanistan including two American soldiers.

== 2015 ==
2015 saw the Taliban make various gains in Afghanistan in an attempt to fracture the fledgling Afghan government with successes not seen since NATO intervened in 2001. The Taliban has increased suicide attacks and has made multiple territorial gains across the country.

=== Kunduz offensive ===
Beginning in April, the Taliban fought for the city of Kunduz in the northern Kunduz Province with them capturing the city by September. Afghan National Security Forces recaptured the city in October but local sources dispute this claim. The quick fall of the city resulted in calls by some government officials for President Ashraf Ghani and CEO Abdullah Abdullah to resign.

=== Helmand offensive ===
In December, the Taliban made more territorial gains by besieging Afghan forces in the cities of Lashkar Gah, Sangin and outlying towns in the Helmand Province in Southern Afghanistan. By late December, most of Sangin was captured by the Taliban with local Afghan forces surrounded and forced to rely on airlifts for ammunition and food.

=== Effects ===
The gains made by the Taliban have hampered peace talks between them and the government and made rifts appear in the Taliban over negotiations. In response to the new offensives, it was reported that the United States would slow down their withdrawal of troops to help in counter-insurgency operations.

== 2016 ==
- 14 April: Taliban attacking Kunduz;
- 31 May: kidnapping a bus with 220 people, killing 10;
- 1 June storming a court in Ghazni, 5 dead Taliban and 5 dead others;
- June: Taliban have 25,000 fighters in Helmand, Kandahar and Uruzgan, according to US sources;
- 18 July attacking Qalai Zal, unsuccessfully;
- July: 20% of Afghanistan is in Taliban hands, said Time magazine;
- December: Taliban controls 10% of Afghanistan, said the US military.
- 31 December: Withdrawal of the majority of U.S. troops from Afghanistan after 15 years of war.

== 2017 ==
On 10 January, the Taliban killed dozens of people in bombings in Kabul and Lashkargah, Helmand Province.

On 21 April, a least 10 Taliban members attacked Camp Shaheen in Mazar-i-Sharif, Balkh Province, killing at least 140 soldiers. All attackers were killed.

On 22 June, a Taliban suicide bomber killed at least 34 people at a bank in Lashkargah.

== 2018 ==
On 27 January, a Taliban suicide bomber killed over 100 people in Kabul using a bomb in an ambulance.

== 2019 ==
Map showing the war as it claims to be in January 2019 but this Map was actually taken between 7 July to 5 August 2021 Under control of the Afghan Government, NATO, and Allies Under control of the Taliban, Al-Qaeda, and Allies Under control of the Islamic State of Iraq and the Levant (ISIL) and Allies Under control of the Pakistani Army

Throughout most of the year, the US government maintained high-level talks with the Taliban, in an effort to secure a peace deal with the insurgency. However, a suicide bombing in Kabul on 7 September 2019 which killed 11 people and one American soldier prompted the US president to break-off peace talks with the Taliban. In mid September, US Secretary of State Mike Pompeo alleged that the Taliban had suffered more than 1,000 war casualties in the space of only one week since the US broke off peace negotiations with the Taliban.

== 2020 ==
On 29 February, the US–Taliban deal was signed in Doha, Qatar. The agreement called for the withdrawal of all 13,000 US and allied troops over the next 14 months, on the condition that the Taliban continues with the peace process. The first withdrawal, of around 5,000 personnel, would occur within the next 135 days.

The peace deal stipulated that the Taliban not allow terrorist organizations like al-Qaeda "to use the soil of Afghanistan to threaten the security of the United States and its allies." If successful, the peace deal will bring an end to 18-years of conflict. Only days after signing the historic deal, US forces conducted airstrikes on Taliban soldiers as a "defensive" measure, as Taliban fighters were "actively attacking" an Afghan government checkpoint.

On 2 May, the US revealed that the agreement included an informal commitment for both sides to cut violence by 80%. Since the agreement was signed, attacks on cities and coalition forces had decreased, but overall attacks had increased 70% compared with the same period in 2019, according to Reuters. The Taliban claim that attacks have fallen since the agreement was signed.

On 14 May, a Taliban suicide truck bomber killed five civilians in Gardez, Paktia Province. On 18 May, the Taliban killed nine people in a similar attack in Ghazni Province.

On 29 May, it was revealed that numerous Taliban and Taliban-aligned Haqqani Network leaders were infected with COVID-19. This resulted in the late founder Mullah Mohammad Omar's son Mullah Mohammad Yaqoob being made the entire organization's acting leader.

By September 2020, there were only around 4,500 American troops remaining in Afghanistan. President Donald Trump tweeted that the remaining troops should be brought back home by Christmas.

On 11 November, Chairman of the Joint Chiefs of Staff Mark Milley received a signed order saying that the United States must remove troops from Afghanistan no later than 15 January 2021. This order was soon replaced by an order to reduce the amount of troops to 2,500 by the same date.

== 2021 ==
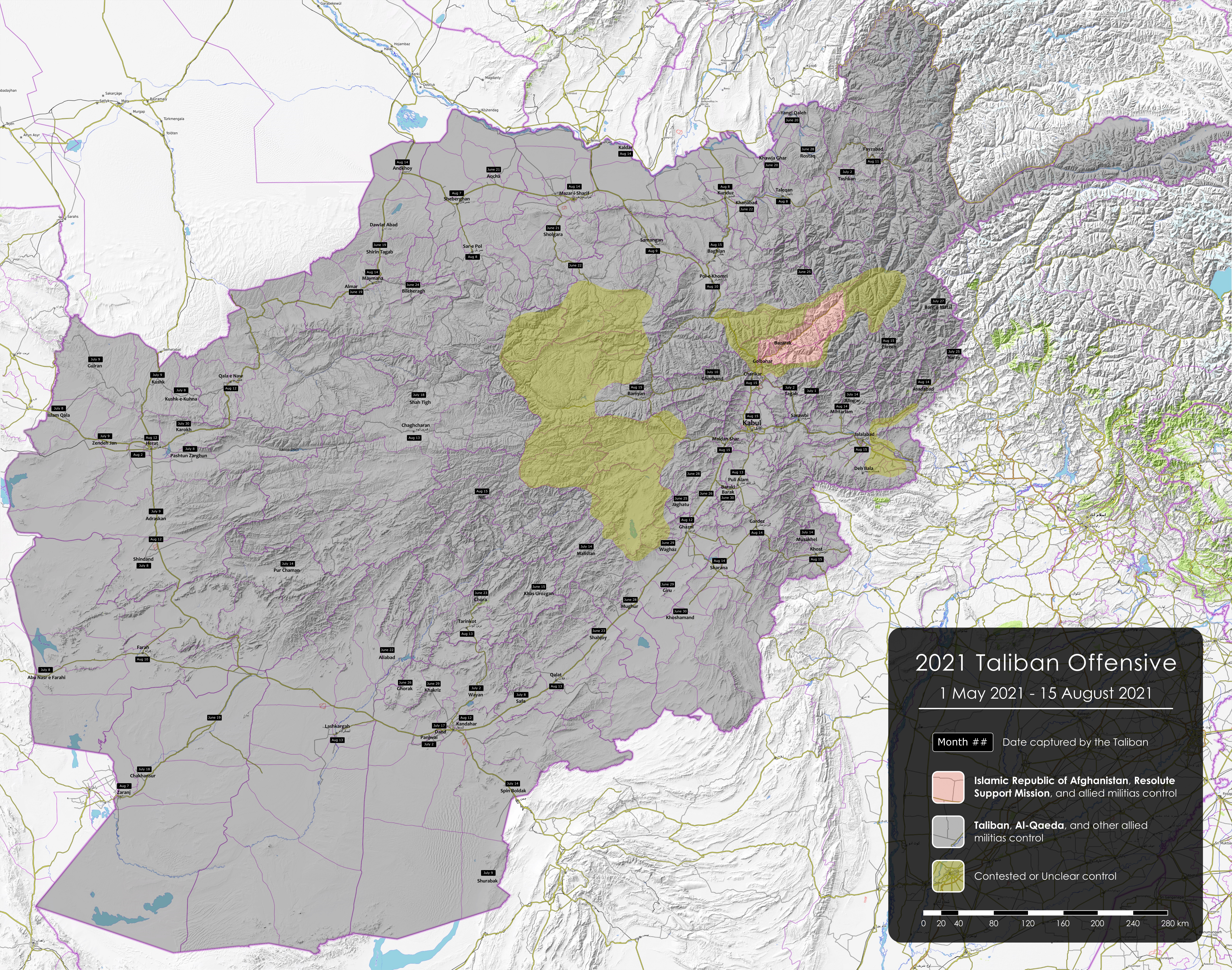
A map of Afghanistan showing the Taliban offensive

In 2021, the United States forces and allies started to withdraw from Afghanistan which allowed the Taliban to intensify their insurgency.

On 16 June, the Taliban executed 22 soldiers from the Afghan National Army as they tried to surrender; local eyewitnesses stated that the language the militants used among themselves was foreign, indicating that the fighters were not from the area.

On 29 June, intense fighting between Taliban insurgents and government forces killed 28 civilians and injured another 290 during the past week, according to the head of a hospital in Kunduz, with the majority of the dead being children, women and elderly people. The Taliban had moved beyond its southern strongholds and had intensified the fighting in the north, according to military experts.

On 2 July, US troops fully left Bagram Airfield, handing it to the Afghan National Security Forces as the coalition, including the US, prepared to leave Afghanistan after 20 years. Meanwhile, fighting continued between the Taliban and government forces, with analysts said that the Taliban would be "at the door of Kabul". Afterwards, Bagram Airfield was looted by locals following the sudden American withdrawal from the airbase, which was conducted without any coordination with local officials. Afghan troops later cleared the airbase of looters and secured control of it.

However, it was reported that, during June, the Taliban captured 700 Humvees as well as dozens of armored vehicles and artillery systems from the Afghan National Army as more districts fall under the group's control during their offensive in the north.

On 4 July, the Taliban took control of several further districts overnight as Afghan troops abandoned their posts and fled into neighboring Tajikistan via Badakhshan Province. The State Committee for National Security of Tajikistan reported that more than 300 Afghan troops crossed the Tajik border as Taliban spokesperson Zabiullah Mujahid confirmed that most of the territory gaining occurred without a fight.

On 5 July, Afghan presidential advisor Hamdullah Mohib said that there would be a counter-offensive against the Taliban in the north after the group captured six districts in Badakhshan Province. A day earlier, at least 1,037 Afghan troops abandoned their positions and fled into Tajikistan.

On 7 July, Taliban insurgents entered Qala e Naw, the provincial capital of Badghis Province, with heavy fighting reported as the militants moved "towards the centre of the city". All government officials in the city had been moved to a nearby army base, while the Taliban had freed about 400 prisoners from the city's prison.

On 9 July, the Taliban captured the border town of Islam Qala, Herat, Afghanistan's biggest border crossing with Iran. On the same day, Taliban insurgents captured the border town of Torghundi on the border with Turkmenistan as the Afghan National Security Forces collapsed in Herat. The Interior Ministry said that troops had been "temporarily relocated" and that efforts were underway to recapture the border crossing. In addition, a spokesperson for Kandahar Province Governor Rohullah Khanzada mentioned that the Taliban had started fighting to capture the city of Kandahar.

On 22 July 100 people were killed in a mass shooting in Spin Boldak District.

On 3 August, a suicide car bomber and gunmen attacked Kabul. Eight people were killed, not including the attackers.

On 9 August, #SanctionPakistan became one of the top Twitter trends in Afghanistan and worldwide, with Afghans holding Pakistan responsible for its support of the Taliban.

On 12 August, about two-thirds of the country was in Taliban hands, with only four cities outside of Taliban control. Sectors of the United States government (CIA) estimated that Kabul would fall within 90 days, and American diplomats were reportedly requesting that the Taliban not deface the American embassy there.

On 15 August, Kabul was captured by the Taliban.

== Aftermath ==
The end of the Taliban insurgency resulted in the beginning of a new insurgency against the restored Islamic Emirate of Afghanistan by the National Resistance Front and allied groups which fight under the banner of the Islamic Republic of Afghanistan.

== See also ==
- Afghan conflict
- Crime in Afghanistan
- War in Afghanistan order of battle, 2012
- Operation Herrick
- Civilian casualties in the war in Afghanistan (2001–2021)
- Coalition casualties in Afghanistan
- List of aviation accidents and incidents in the war in Afghanistan
- British Forces casualties in Afghanistan
- Canadian Forces casualties in Afghanistan
- Iraqi insurgency
- Islamic Emirate of Waziristan
- Foreign hostages in Afghanistan
- War crimes by the Taliban
- Afghanistan peace process
- Reconstruction in Afghanistan
- 2025 hunger crisis in Afghanistan
