= Assassination attempts on Hibatullah Akhundzada =

Failed attempts on the Supreme Leader of Afghanistan

The Supreme Leader of Afghanistan, Mullah Hibatullah Akhundzada, was subject to three failed assassination attempts before and after his reign on 25 May 2016.

== Assassination attempts ==
=== October 2012 ===
At least three attempts have been made to assassinate Akhundzada. During a 2012 lecture by Akhundzada, in Quetta, a man stood up among the students and pointed a pistol at Akhundzada from a close range, but the pistol jammed. Mullah Ibrahim, a student of Akhundzada, told The New York Times that "Taliban rushed to tackle" and restrain the attacker, before he could clear the jam; Akhundzada reportedly did not move during the incident, or the chaos that followed. The Taliban accused the National Directorate of Security, the Afghan intelligence agency, of the attempted shooting.

=== August 2019 ===
During the Friday prayer on 16 August 2019, a powerful blast tore through the Khair ul-Madaris mosque in Kuchlak, Quetta, Pakistan, killing Akhundzada's brother Hafiz Ahmadullah and their father. Ahmadullah had succeeded Akhundzada as leader of the mosque, which had served as the main meeting place of the Quetta Shura after Akhundzada was appointed as the Emir of the Taliban. "It was a timed device planted under the wooden chair of the prayer leader", said Abdul Razzaq Cheema, the Quetta police chief. However, the police did not reveal the identity of the victims. More of Akhundzada's relatives were later confirmed to have died in the blast. The High Council of Afghanistan Islamic Emirate, a breakaway faction of the Taliban, claimed responsibility for the attack, adding that the prime target was Akhundzada.

=== May 2024 ===
On 18 May 2024, the Afghanistan Freedom Front (AFF) insurgency group released a statement claiming that they carried out an assassination attempt against Akhundzada near the Shah-Do Shamshira Mosque in Kabul while he was visiting the city. According to the AFF's statement, Akhundzada escaped, while three of his special security guards were killed and one was injured. The AFF also posted a video of what they claimed was the attack on their X social media account. The Taliban did not comment on the report, though it was acknowledged by Afghanistan International that local sources did report an explosion in the first district of Kabul.

== See also ==
- Taliban
- High Council of the Islamic Emirate of Afghanistan
- Quetta Shura
- List of people who survived assassination attempts
