= Atiqullah =

Atiqullah (Arabic: عتیق الله) is a male Muslim given name, formed from the elements Atiq, meaning freed, and Allah, meaning of God. It may refer to:

- Atiqullah Atifmal (born 1957), Afghan diplomat
- Atiqullah Baryalai (born 1965), Afghan military officer
- Atiqullah Ludin, Afghan provincial governor, 2008–2013
- Atiqullah Raufi (?–2014), Afghan judicial administrator
- Atiq Ullah (footballer) (born 1983), Pakistani footballer
- Atiq Ullah (Kashmiri leader) (1872–1962), Indian Mirwaiz of Kashmir
- Atiq Ullah (politician), Bangladeshi politician

== See also ==
- Khwaja Atiqullah (1876–1945), British Indian politician
