= 2013 Herat US consulate attack =

Taliban attack in Afghanistan

2013 attack on U.S. consulate in Herat
- Part of the War in Afghanistan (2001–2021)
- Location of Herat Province in Afghanistan
- Location: Herat, Afghanistan
- Date: 13 September 2013; 5.30 am
- Target: U.S. consulate
- Attack type: Truck bombing, mass shooting
- Weapons: Truck bomb, assault rifles, RPGs
- Deaths: 8 attackers, 8 guards, and 1 Afghan policeman
- Injuries: 20
- Perpetrator: Taliban

The U.S. consulate in Herat, Afghanistan was attacked on September 13, 2013, by a group of Taliban militants. Reports indicated that the assault began at 5:30 am on the front gate of the consulate. A large truck drove up to the consulate's primary vehicle entry point and detonated a massive improvised explosive charge, causing extensive damage. A minivan carrying an assault team armed with assault rifles and rocket-propelled grenades arrived and opened fire, moving into the consulate compound. Then, the driver of the minivan ignited a bomb inside the minivan, which exploded a short time afterwards. Eight Afghan members of the consulate's guard force and one Afghan police officer were killed. An unknown number of bystanders were wounded. A gun battle ensued, and all seven attackers were killed. No Americans were killed or seriously injured. The U.S. Department of State awarded Heroism Awards to several of the consulate's defenders.

The Taliban took credit for the attack in an emailed statement.

In a press release, the United Nations condemned the attack "in the strongest terms."

== See also ==
- 2014 attack on Indian consulate in Herat
- Attacks on the United States
