= 2014 attack on Indian consulate in Herat =

Attack on Indian consulate by Pakistan-based militants

2014 Attack on Indian Consulate in Herat
- Part of War in Afghanistan (2001–2021)
- Location of Herat Province in Afghanistan
- Location: Herat, Afghanistan
- Date: 23 May 2014; 3:15 a.m.
- Target: Indian consulate
- Weapon: assault rifles
- Deaths: 4 attackers
- Injuries: 2+
- Perpetrator: Lashkar-e-Taiba

The Indian consulate in Herat, Afghanistan was attacked on 23 May 2014 by four heavily armed militants, three days before the inaugural ceremony of Narendra Modi as the Prime Minister of India.

== The attack ==
The Indian consulate in Herat, Afghanistan was attacked around 3:15 a.m. on 23 May 2014 by four heavily armed militants. The attackers were armed with machine guns, rocket-propelled grenades, hand grenades and suicide vests. They opened fire from a nearby home. All the attackers were killed during a lengthy gun battle, two by the Indo-Tibetan Border Police (ITBP) and others by the Afghan security forces.

No one in the consulate's staff was injured. A squad of 23 ITBP personnel was guarding the consulate. The consulate, located in central Herat, enjoys extensive protection comparable only to the U.S. consulate in the city. It has at least three layers of security, and visitors must walk 200 m to reach it as the road leading to it is barricaded.

No group claimed responsibility for the attack.

== Analysis ==
On 25 May, the Afghan president Hamid Karzai informed Indian media that the Lashkar-e-Taiba (LeT), a Pakistani terrorist organisation with links to the Pakistani intelligence agency ISI, was responsible for the attack. Indian security agencies also agreed with the assessment. In June, the US State Department came out with its own assessment that the LeT was responsible for the attacks and redesignated LeT as a terrorist organisation. After a symbolic ban by President Musharraf, the LeT had renamed itself Jamat ud Dawa and begun posing as a charity.

According to American South Asia analyst Bruce Riedel, the LeT had planned to take Indian diplomats hostage and execute them just as Narendra Modi was taking office. Their goal was, according to Riedel, to discredit Pakistan's own Prime Minister Nawaz Sharif, who was due to attend Modi's inaugural ceremony. This was meant to be payback to Sharif for having put the former army dictator Pervez Musharraf on trial for treason.

The Diplomat reported a Pakistani security expert stating that the timing of the attack was related to the swearing-in ceremony of Narendra Modi. There were said to be forces in Pakistan that were agitated about any bonhomie with the BJP leader as they see him as an enemy.

== Reactions ==
Afghanistan's President Hamid Karzai spoke to India's Prime Minister designate Narendra Modi after the attack and called it "an attack on Afghanistan, India and our shared interests". Narendra Modi condemned the attack and assured support to Amar Sinha, the Indian ambassador to Afghanistan.

The External affairs ministry of Sri Lanka and Foreign Affairs Ministry of Pakistan also condemned the attack.

== See also ==
- 2013 Indian embassy attack
- 2013 attack on U.S. consulate in Herat
