= High Council of the Islamic Emirate of Afghanistan =

Breakaway Taliban faction founded in 2015

- د افغانستان اسلامي امارت عالي شوری
- Jihadist flag, which was used by the group multiple times Flag of the Taliban, which the group split from
- Leaders: Hafiz Khalid Niazi; Abdul Manan Niazi †; Mansoor Dadullah †; Shir Mohammad Akhundzada; Mullah Baz Mohammad Haris (defected); Nangialai Khan (commander) †
- Founded: 2015
- Dates active: 2015-present (joined Taliban)
- Split from: Taliban (rejoined in 2021)
- Merged into: Taliban
- Allegiance: Islamic Emirate of Afghanistan (since 2021)
- Active regions: Afghanistan
- Ideology: Jihadism; Pro-Islamic State (alleged, until 2021)
- Size: 3,000–3,500
- Part of: Taliban (since 2021)

High Council of the Islamic Emirate of Afghanistan (HCIEA) (Pashto: دٙ اَفغانِستان اِسلامي اِمارَت عالي شوریٰ, romanized: Də Afġānistān Islāmī Imārat Ālī Šūrā ; Dari: شُورٰایِ عٰالئِ اِمٰارَتِ اِسلٰامئِ اَفغٰانِستٰان, romanized: Šūrā-yi Ālī-yi Imārat-i Islāmī-yi Afġānistān) was a breakaway Taliban faction active in Afghanistan since 2015. The faction broke away from the Taliban in 2015 following the appointment of Akhtar Mansour as the leader of the Taliban and elected Muhammad Rasul as its leader. The faction was involved in deadly clashes with mainstream Taliban in southern and western Afghanistan, leaving scores of dead on both sides. The Islamic Republic of Afghanistan allegedly provided financial and military support to the faction, however, both the Islamic Republic and the faction denied this. Following the Taliban offensive of 2021 and the fall of Afghanistan to Taliban forces, the group dissolved, and its leaders pledged allegiance to the new government.

== History ==
In 2015, Akhtar Mansour was appointed as the leader of the Taliban. However, Mansour's claim to the leadership was rejected by some among the Taliban ranks. Dissidents within the Taliban, particularly from the Nurzai tribe, unhappy with the appointment of Mansour as the new chief, formed a breakaway faction and elected Muhammad Rasul as its leader. The faction was named High Council of the Islamic Emirate of Afghanistan by its newly elected leader. Abdul Manan Niazi, Mansoor Dadullah and Shir Mohammad Akhundzada were appointed to deputies on military affairs and Mullah Baz Mohammad Haris was appointed deputy for political affairs of the faction. The same year, clashes broke out between the Taliban faction and mainstream Taliban in Zabul province. Mohmand Nostrayar, governor of Arghandab, and a Taliban commander in Zabul said that Islamic State militants had joined forces with Rasul's faction in southern Afghanistan. Mansour responded by sending as many as 450 Taliban fighters to crush Mullah Dadullah, a deputy in Rasul's faction, and Islamic State element in Zabul. Dadullah and IS were eventually defeated by Mansour's forces. Mohmand Nostrayar said the fighting took place in three districts of Zabul province and 86 IS militants and fighters loyal to Dadullah were killed in the clash. 26 Taliban fighters were also killed in the same clash. Hajji Atta Jan, the Zabul provincial council chief, said the offensive by Mullah Mansour’s fighters was so intense that at least three Islamic State commanders, all of them ethnic Uzbeks, had surrendered. They were also asking others IS militants to do the same.

However, while the Taliban had succeeded in quickly crushing the rebellion in Zabul province, they had more difficulty fighting in the predominantly Nurzai western region of Afghanistan, particularly the stronghold of Shindand district near Herat. This prompted Akhtar Mansour to seek help from Iran against the mutineers, which agreed to his request and sided with the Taliban loyalists. The High Council responded by claiming to have killed multiple members of the Fatemiyoun division near Herat.

In 2017, the Taliban said that they have arrested 90 infiltrators in Helmand province. According to the Taliban, the infiltrators were involved in assassination plots against the mainstream Taliban.

In 2020, Nangialai Khan was killed in a US drone strike in Herat province.

In 2021, Abdul Manan Niazi, one of the deputy of Rasul's faction, was killed in an attack in Herat province. No group took responsibility for the attack, but many suspect the Islamic Emirate to be responsible. Former spokesman of the Afghan National Security Council Javid Faisal paid homage to Niazi and prayed for him in a tweet. A funeral ceremony was held in the city of Herat's grand mosque, unopposed by the governor of Herat, who said that the families of High Council fighters would be allowed to bury their dead and hold funerals.

Following his killing, Abdul Manan Niazi's son, Hafiz Khalid Niazi, was elected to succeed his father by supporters of the High Council. After the 2021 Taliban offensive defeated the Islamic Republic's forces, he pledged allegiance to the Islamic Emirate's leadership, dissolving the High Council and handing all of its military equipment to the Taliban. In January 2022, Muhammad Rasul met with defense minister Mullah Yaqoob in Kabul and affirmed the factions's support for the new government.

== Support from the Islamic Republic of Afghanistan ==
The Islamic Republic of Afghanistan has allegedly provided financial and military support to the faction, although the High Council has always denied it. The Wall Street Journal reported that the aim of the support was create rift within the insurgency and force some of its leaders toward peace talks. Senior Afghan and US officials, including those who had role in creating the program, told Wall Street Journal that Afghan intelligence agency was leading the drive to recruit Taliban assets using the funds and resources provided by United States. The aim of the program was to exploit divisions among the Taliban and it targeted insurgents who have defected to Rasul's faction. Afghan and U.S. officials said that the former Afghan government had been providing Rasul's faction and other fractious Taliban groups with cash, ammunition and weapons. In March 2016, Afghan special forces rescued Nangialai Khan, a commander loyal to Rasul's faction, and his foot soldiers from a Taliban encirclement in Zerkoh Valley. Since then, Afghan intelligence agency has provided financial and military support to Nangialai in his fight against the Taliban, according to US coalition officer and a member of Afghan special forces who maintain contact with Nangialai.

In 2020, following the death of Nangialai Khan, elders and provincial council members from Herat province said that Nangialai had close relations with the Afghan government. Elders also claimed that Nangialai had foiled multiple Taliban attacks on the center of Shindand and even saved Herat's governor, Abdul Qayum Rahimi, from a Taliban ambush.

The New York Times reported that Rasul's faction has become a de facto ally of the Islamic Republic and has been able to achieve success in areas where it had suffered defeats in the past. In 2017, a Taliban suicide bomber struck a base belonging to Rasul's faction near an Afghan army base. Hamidullah Afghan, a local police official, said that the attack had killed 11 fighters of Rasul's faction and that the authorities had helped evacuate the wounded fighters to a hospital in Lashkar Gah. An Afghan border police official told The New York Times that the Afghan intelligence agency pays the fighters loyal to Rasul with salaries equivalent to $150 to $300 a month, and supplies them with food, weapons and vehicles. Haji Ajab Gul, a former governor of Shindand, said that Rasul's faction moved freely in government controlled areas and they could come to the main town of Shindand and target people who they dislike. Lal Muhammad Omarzay, the governor of Adraskan District, said that the Afghan army had thwarted a planned assault by the Taliban against Rasul's faction in Herat province. Lal Muhammad Omarzay also said that Afghan government forces did not confront Rasul's faction. Rasul's faction also avoided fighting the Islamic Republic.
