= List of private contractor deaths in Afghanistan =

Foreign contractor deaths in Afghanistan by country

USA: 121
UK: 22
Nepal: 19
Ukraine: 17
Canada: 13
Philippines: 13
Russia: 13
India: 11
People's Republic of China: 11
South Africa: 10
Pakistan: 9
Turkey: 7
North Macedonia: 5
Azerbaijan: 3
Tajikistan: 3
Bosnia and Herzegovina: 3
Germany: 3
South Korea: 2
Venezuela: 2
Zimbabwe: 2
Bangladesh: 1
France: 1
Ireland: 1
Japan: 1
Kazakhstan: 1
Kosovo: 1
Malaysia: 1
Myanmar: 1
Romania: 1
UAE: 1
Unidentified: 8

TOTAL: 307

This is a partial list of private contractors and aid workers killed in the War in Afghanistan according to a few published news sources. It was reported that by July 2007, at least 75 foreign contractors had been killed in the war.

It was also reported that from 2001 to 2009, at least 289 contractors had been killed in the war.

The U.S. Department of Labor confirmed that by March 31, 2021, a total of 1,822 civilian contractors were killed in Afghanistan, of which, during the period between June 2009 and April 2010, 260 were private security contractors.

As of June 24, 2019, 305 foreign private contractor deaths in Afghanistan as part of the War in Afghanistan are listed in this article. Of these, 121 are Americans, 22 are Britons, 19 are Nepalese, 17 are Ukrainians and 13 are Canadians. At least 58 of those killed were private military contractors or PMCs.

== Incidents of foreign contractor deaths ==
=== 2003 ===
- February 8, 2003 – Two Pakistani engineers were killed in an ambush in Ghazni province.
- November 8, 2003 – An Indian telecommunications engineer was shot and killed. He was working for the Afghan Wireless Company.

=== 2004 ===
- March 5, 2004 – A Turkish road engineer was killed in an ambush in Zabul province.
- May 5, 2004 – Two British PMCs were killed in an ambush in Nuristan province.
- June 10, 2004 – 11 Chinese road engineers were killed in an attack on their compound in Kunduz province.
- August 29, 2004 – Three American and three Nepalese PMCs were killed when a suicide bomber attacked DynCorp's office in Kabul.
- October 23, 2004 – An American translator was killed by a suicide bomber in Kabul.
- November 27, 2004 – Three American crew members died when a CASA C-212 plane crashed in western Afghanistan. They were worked for Presidential Airways, a Blackwater sister company.
- December 14, 2004 – A Turkish road engineer was captured and executed in Kunar province.

=== 2005 ===
- January 20, 2005 – One Pakistani truck driver was killed in an ambush in Kandahar province.
- February 3, 2005 – Three American aid workers were killed when their transport plane crashed near Kabul.
- February 8, 2005 – An American contractor, Michael E. Vander Luitgaren, passed away while working in Afghanistan.
- March 8, 2005 – One British contractor, working for Afghanistan's rural development ministry, was shot and killed in Kabul.
- April 1, 2005 – Two Pakistani truck drivers were killed in an ambush in Kandahar province.
- April 6, 2005 – Three American Halliburton contractors were killed when a military CH-47 Chinook helicopter crashed in a sandstorm in Ghazni province. Fifteen soldiers also died in the crash.
- May 9, 2005 – One Myanmar U.N. engineer was killed by a bomb in Kabul.
- June 7, 2005 – Two Pakistani truck drivers were killed in an ambush in Kandahar province.
- July 18, 2005 – Two Zimbabwean mine technicians (Fidelis Makwena and Moses Sibanda) were killed by a landmine they were clearing. They were employed by Mine-Tech.
- August 31, 2005 – A British PMC was captured and executed three days later.
- November 11, 2005 – Eight crew members of an Il-76 were killed when their plane crashed near Kabul. They included: five Russians, two Ukrainians and one Pakistani.
- November 18, 2005 – An Indian truck driver Maniappan Raman Kutty was captured in southern Afghanistan. His body was found four days later. He worked for the Border Roads Organisation.

=== 2006 ===
- February 7, 2006 – One Indian engineer (Bharat Kumar), one Turkish road engineer (Ufuk Aydin) and a Nepalese PMC were killed by a roadside bomb in Farah province.
- February 13, 2006 – An American contractor died of natural causes at Bagram airfield.
- March 10, 2006 – Four Macedonian cleaners were captured and executed; their bodies were found one week later.
- March 28, 2006 – A South African PMC was killed by a roadside bomb in Farah province. An American contractor, working for KBR, died of natural causes at Bagram airfield.
- April 3, 2006 – One Turkish road engineer was killed in Nimroz province.
- April 24, 2006 – Two Ukrainian pilots were killed when their An-26 plane crashed in Helmand province.
- April 28, 2006 – An Indian telecommunications engineer, K. Suryanarayan, was captured in Zabul province. He was executed two days later. He was worker for Al-Moayed, Bahrain-based company.
- May 18, 2006 – An American PMC, Ron Zimmerman, who worked for DynCorp International, was killed by a roadside bomb in Herat province.
- July 23, 2006 – A Canadian carpenter, Mike Frastacky, was shot and killed in Nahrin.
- July 26, 2006 – Two American contractors were killed when their transport helicopter crashed in eastern Afghanistan.
- August 28, 2006 – A Turkish road engineer was killed, and a Turkish PMC was captured in an attack in Helmand province; the PMC was killed 22 days later.
- September 22, 2006 – A Pakistani truck driver was killed in an ambush near Jalalabad.
- December 3, 2006 – Eight Russian crew members of an Mi-26 were killed when their helicopter crashed in Oruzgan province.
- December 6, 2006 – Two American PMCs were killed by a suicide bomber in Kandahar province.

=== 2007 ===
- January 28, 2007 – An American construction engineer was killed by a suicide bomber in Kabul.
- February 27, 2007 – An American supply worker was killed by a suicide bomber at Bagram Air Base.
- March 8, 2007 – A German aid worker was shot and killed in Shar-e-Pul province. He was worked for Deutsche Welthungerhilfe.
- April 17, 2007 – Four Nepalese PMCs were killed by a roadside bomb in Kabul.
- June 13, 2007 – A United Arab Emirates PMC was captured in Helmand province; he is still missing and presumed dead.
- July 19 – August 30, 2007 – Two South Korean aid workers were killed during a hostage crisis.
- July 28, 2007 – An American and a Nepalese PMC were killed by a suicide bomber in Kabul.
- August 15, 2007 – A British PMC was shot and killed in Kabul.
- August 21, 2007 – A Filipino road engineer was killed in an attack on his offices in Paktia province.
- September 11, 2007 – A Turkish road engineer was killed by a roadside bomb in Paktia province.
- September 12, 2007 – A Bangladeshi aid worker was shot and killed in Badakhshan province.

=== 2008 ===
- January 14, 2008 – An American, Thor Hesla, and a Filipino contractor were killed in an attack on their hotel in Kabul.
- January 26, 2008 – An American aid worker was captured and executed one month later, her body was never found.
- April 1, 2008 – An American contractor was killed in an accident in Kabul.
- April 12, 2008 – Two Indian road engineers were killed by two suicide bombers in Nimroz province.
- May 7, 2008 – A U.S. tribal customs contractor, Michael Bhatia, was killed, along with two US soldiers, by a roadside bomb in Khost province.
- August 13, 2008 – An American, a Canadian and an Irish aid worker were shot and killed in Pul-i-Alam, the capital of Logar province. They were worked for the International Rescue Committee.
- August 27, 2008 – A Japanese agricultural engineer was captured and executed in Nangarhar province.
- October 13, 2008 – An Indian food provider was captured and executed four months later.
- October 20, 2008 – A British aid worker, employed by SERVE Afghanistan, was shot and killed in Kabul.
- October 25, 2008 – A Briton and a South African, working for DHL courier service, were shot and killed in Kabul.

=== 2009 ===
- January 7, 2009 – An American social scientist/anthropologist died at Brooke Army Medical Center in San Antonio, Texas of wounds received on November 4, 2008, when she was doused with fuel and set afire by a Taliban member posing as an Afghan civilian.
- February 28, 2009 – An American PMC, Santos Cardona, was killed by a roadside bomb in Uruzgan province. Cardona had previously served time for his role in the Abu Ghraib torture and prisoner abuse scandal.
- March 20, 2009 – A Filipino carpenter was killed in a rocket attack on the Kandahar Air Base.
- May 2, 2009 – An American PMC was killed in an ambush east of Kabul.
- May 20, 2009 – An American PMC was killed by a roadside bomb near Kabul.
- July 3, 2009 – An unidentified foreign road engineer was killed by a roadside bomb in Paktia province.
- July 14, 2009 – Six Ukrainian crew members were killed when their Mi-26 helicopter was shot down in Helmand province.
- July 19, 2009 – Ten Filipino construction workers, four Nepalese contractors, one American PMC and one unidentified foreign contractor were killed when their Mi-8 helicopter crashed at the Kandahar Air Base.
- August 16, 2009 – A British PMC was killed in an ambush in Herat province.
- August 17, 2009 – An American civilian working for the military was killed in an ambush in the east of the country.
- September 19, 2009 – The body of a Briton, who had worked as an advisor with the Ministry for Rural Rehabilitation and Development, was found in a room in Qasar Park Guest House in Kabul.
- October 13, 2009 – International Security Assistance Forces recovered the remains of three civilian crew members and the wreckage of an aircraft missing since October 13 in the rugged mountains of northeast Afghanistan.
- November 14, 2009 – An American contractor was killed by a roadside bomb in eastern Afghanistan.
- November 23, 2009 – Three Ukrainians were killed when their Mi-8 helicopter under contract for NATO forces crashed in eastern Logar province. Helicopter belonged to Air Freight Aviation (UAE).
- December 30, 2009 – Two US Blackwater Contractors along with seven other members of the CIA and Jordanian intelligence were killed when a suicide bomber detonated at Forward Operating Base Chapman, a military outpost in Khost Province used formerly used by the CIA in support of intelligence gathering operations.

=== 2010 ===
- January 31, 2010 – An American contractor was killed, along with two U.S. soldiers, in an ambush in eastern Afghanistan.
- March 15, 2010 – A Bosnian firefighter was killed in a rocket attack on a U.S. military base.
- April 9, 2010 – An American contractor was killed, along with three U.S. soldiers, when their Osprey helicopter crashed in Zabul province.
- April 20, 2010 – A Bosnian PSC Perica Jaric was killed by roadside bomb. He worked for SOC LLC
- May 6, 2010 – Ryan Lozier, a U.S. private security contractor was killed by a roadside bomb while working for Global Security Solutions, a private security company.
- May 19, 2010 – An American PMC was killed when the Bagram military air base was attacked.
- June 17, 2010 – An American contractor was hung at Camp Phoenix, Afghanistan military base.
- July 2, 2010 – Six militants armed with suicide bombs stormed the compound of D.A.I. (an American contractor working for the United States Agency for International Development) in city of Kunduz, killing four security officers (one Briton, one German and two Afghans who worked for Edinburgh International)
- July 20, 2010 – Two American PMCs were killed by an Afghan soldier, who was a Taliban infiltrator, at a military base outside Mazar-e-Sharif.
- July 29, 2010 – An American PMC, Robert Wayne Pittman Jr., was killed while working as a combat advisor.
- August 2010 – One British security contractor, Ken McGonigle, was shot dead in Musa Qala. He was working for New Century.
- September 6, 2010 – Two American PMCs (Matthew Attilai and Chris Vaile) were killed by an IED.
- September 10, 2010 – An American contractor, Javier de la Garza, was killed when the bunker he was sleeping in on a military base came under fire.
- November 20, 2010 – A British PMC Mark Fitzpatrick was killed when ammunition he was disposing of in Parwan province exploded. He was worked for DynCorp International.

=== 2011 ===
- April 16, 2011 – An American PMC was killed by a suicide bomber, posing as an Afghan soldier, at a military base in Nangarhar province.
- April 27, 2011 – An American PMC was shot and killed by an Afghan Air Force member at a military base in Kabul province.
- May 25, 2011 – Bosnian PSC Nenad Antic aka Ness was killed by roadside bomb in Afghanistan. He was working for SOC-LLC.
- June 4, 2011 – An American PMC, Brett Benton, was killed when an improvised explosive device detonated near a vehicle in Alingar District, Laghman Province. He was working for DynCorp International.
- July 6, 2011 – IL-76TD cargo plane, registered 4K-AZ55, was destroyed in an accident near Bagram Air Base, Afghanistan. The plane is said to have flown into the side of a mountain at about 12,500 feet (3,800 meters). The aircraft belonged to "Silk Way Airlines". The transport plane carried a total of 18 tons of cargo for the NATO-led forces at Bagram Air Base. All nine crew members died in accident – three of them were citizens of Azerbaijan.
- July 9, 2011 – An American PMC was killed in an ambush.
- October 29, 2011 – 5 American contractors, 2 British contractors, and 1 Kosovan contractor were killed, along with 4 US and 1 Canadian soldier, including a civilian employee of the Defense Contract Management Agency, in a suicide bomb attack on their military convoy in Kabul.
- December 18, 2011 – One American contractor died on FOB Salerno while working on a camera system. Details of his death remain unclear to the next of kin. The specifics have been held back by the contractors employer and the insurance company carrying the Defense Base Act insurance. The insurance company has denied payment of claim by the next of kin.

=== 2012 ===
- January 16, 2012 – Three American private contractors working for the Defense Department were killed when their helicopter crashed in Helmand province. They were working for AAR Airlift company.
- February 11, 2012 – Mi-8MTV-1 helicopter crashed in Zabul province, 3 crew members – citizens of Tajikistan were killed.
- April 15, 2012 – An American PMC, Norman Spruill, was killed in Logar province in a gun battle with insurgents in Puli ALam.
- April 18, 2012 – One U.S. private contractor died; 43-year-old Billy Ross Blankenship was working in Kabul as a contractor for Intelligence Software Solutions, Inc. His cause of death is still under investigation.
- July 22, 2012 – Two Americans and one British NATO contractors were shot and killed in Afghanistan by an Afghan man dressed in an Afghan police uniform in a military training centre near the Herat Airport.
- September 18, 2012 – A suicide bomber killed a total of 12 foreign civilians (one was Briton. and eight were South Africans) and three Afghans near an airport in Kabul.
- September 29, 2012 – One U.S. civilian contractor (Kevin O’Rourke) was killed in the Sayed Abad district of the Wardak province, when an Afghan National Army member opened fire on American troops.
- December 24, 2012 – An Iranian woman, dressed in an Afghan police uniform, killed (in an insider attack) an American contractor in Kabul police headquarters. The contractor (Joseph Griffin) was working for DynCorp International. This is the first reported insider attack committed by a woman.

=== 2013 ===
- March 2013 – One civilian contractor, Inez "Renee" Baker, was killed on Forward Operating Base Tagab in Kapisa province when three men wearing Afghan National Army uniforms slammed an Afghan Army vehicle into the main gate and opened fire.
- April 6, 2013 – An American Defense Department contractor was killed in Zabul province by a car bomb.
- April 29, 2013 – National Airlines Flight 102, a Boeing 747-400BCF operated under contract for NATO forces en route to Dubai, United Arab Emirates crashed shortly after takeoff from Bagram Air Base in Afghanistan. The plane's operator, National Air Cargo, confirmed that all seven American civilian crew members were killed.
- May 16, 2013 – Four American employees of DynCorp International, Robert Halsell, Angel Roldan, Michael Bradford and Joseph Elrod, were killed and three others were wounded in a suicide car bombing in Kabul.
- June 8, 2013 – An American contractor, Joseph Morabito, who worked as a private military contractor, was killed by a soldier in an Afghan National Army uniform on an Afghan base in Paktika.
- July 2, 2013 – A British contractor, Mark Duffus, who worked as security consultant manager with Blue Hackle Security, was killed by truck bomb at a NATO supplier's compound in Kabul. An American contractor, Kurt Muncy, who worked as an international police adviser for DynCorp International was also killed. Also, four Nepali guards, one Romanian citizen (who was employee of an international firm that serves a logistics base) and three Indian civilian contractors (Sandeep Gilaji, Kaushik Chakrabarty and Naveen Kumar Gurudi) were killed.
- November 30, 2013 – Two American contractors, Albert Henry Haas and Kathleen Pennell, were killed on Bagram from a rocket attack. Both worked for AAR Airlift Corp.
- December 27, 2013 – An ISAF contractor died of non-combat injuries.
- December 2013 – An American contractor, Lee McCubbins, who worked with Pax Mondial (an Arlington-based subcontractor for Black & Veatch Corp.), was shot and killed while performing subcontract work at the Kajaki Dam project in the Helmand province.

=== 2014 ===
- January 10, 2014 – An ISAF contractor died in an aircraft crash along with two ISAF soldiers.
- February 10, 2014 – Two American contractors working for DynCorp. International, Mike Hughes and Paul E. Goins, Jr., were killed by a suicide bomber in Kabul.
- February 21, 2014 – An ISAF contractor died of non-combat injuries.
- February 24, 2014 – An ISAF contractor died of non-combat injuries.
- March 16, 2014 – An ISAF contractor died of non-combat injuries.
- April 3, 2014 – An ISAF contractor died of non-combat injuries.
- May 12, 2014 – An ISAF contractor died of non-combat injuries.
- May 23, 2014 – An ISAF contractor died of non-combat injuries.
- November 18, 2014 – One Nepali security contractor, Niranjan Tamang, was killed in Kabul when the suicide bomber attacked a heavily fortified Green Village.
- November 27, 2014 – One British security contractor who worked for G4S was killed by a suicide bomber in Kabul, and another one was injured.
- December 19, 2014 – An ISAF contractor died of non-combat injuries.

=== 2015 ===
- January 29, 2015 – Three U.S. contractors working for Praetorian Standard, Inc. in Afghanistan were shot and killed on the military side of Kabul Airport.
- June 8, 2015 – A Resolute Support Mission contractor was killed in a mortar attack on Bagram airfield.
- June 27, 2015 – A Resolute Support Mission contractor died of a non-battle related medical condition.
- May 17, 2015 – One British security contractor, Michael Hampshire, was killed in Kabul.
- August 22, 2015 – Three American PMCs working for DynCorp International were killed in Kabul in a suicide car-bombing.
- October 1, 2015 – U.S. contractors Chris Ruiz, Carlos Carrasco, Kevin Mason and two other civilian contractors working with NATO's Resolute Support Mission were killed in C-130J crash.
- October 11, 2015 – One French contracted civilian died after a helicopter crashed while attempting to land at the Resolute Support headquarters in Kabul.
- December 20, 2015 – One U.S. civilian contractor working for USAID, Lisa Marie Akban, was shot dead in a residential area of Kabul.

=== 2016 ===
- November 12, 2016 – Two U.S. contractors, working for the Texas-based construction and engineering company Fluor, were killed in a suicide-bombing at the Bagram airfield along with two U.S. soldiers.

=== 2018 ===
- January 20, 2018 – Nine foreign Kam Air staff members were killed in a Taliban attack on a hotel in Kabul – seven Ukrainian employees and two Kam Air employees from Venezuela. Four Americans, one German and one Kazakh were also killed.
- August 2, 2018 – Three contractors, an Indian, a Malaysian and a Macedonia, working for the French company Sodexo were abducted and killed in Kabul, while they were on their way to the airport.

=== 2019 ===
- June 19, 2019 – An American security contractor, Kevin Yali, was killed in a mortar attack.
- June 24, 2019 – An American security contractor, Christian H. McCoy, was killed possibly by a roadside bomb.
