= Atiqullah Raufi =

Afghan government worker murdered by the Taliban in 2014

Atiqullah Raufi was the chief of the secretariat of the Supreme Court of Afghanistan. He was assassinated as he was heading to work on December 13, 2014, around 9:00 a.m., in Kabul, Afghanistan. The Taliban claimed responsibility for the incident.

The attack was one in a series of attacks targeting Afghanistan's legal system in 2013–2015.

== See also ==
- Taliban insurgency
