= Muhammad Rasul =

Afghan Taliban breakaway group leader since 2015

Supreme Leader of High Council of Afghanistan Islamic Emirate
- In office 2016–2021
- Preceded by: Office established

Governor of Nimruz Province for the Islamic Emirate of Afghanistan
- In office 1996–2001
- Succeeded by: Abdul Karim Brahui

Personal details
- Born: c. 1965 (age 60–61) Kandahar Province, Kingdom of Afghanistan
- Religion: Islam

Military service
- Allegiance: Mujahideen; Taliban; HCIEA (2015-2021)
- Years of service: 1994–present
- Battles/wars: War in Afghanistan (2001–2021); Islamic State–Taliban conflict

Muhammad Rasul was the leader of the High Council of the Islamic Emirate of Afghanistan, a Taliban dissident group in Afghanistan, until the group's dissolution in 2021. He was a Taliban-appointed governor of Nimruz Province, Afghanistan. Rasul exerted pressure and suppression on Pashtun factions unpopular with the Taliban, and made a considerable fortune controlling cross-border drug-smuggling through Nimruz.

== Early life ==
Rasul is believed to have been born in the mid-1960s in Kandahar Province, Afghanistan.

== Early career ==
=== Taliban rule ===
Rasul was the Governor for Nimruz Province when the Taliban were in power during the Islamic Emirate of Afghanistan. He is said to have had close relations with founding Taliban leader Mohammed Omar, and is considered to have been an "old and trusted friend" to him.

=== Invasion of US ===
Rasul and his functionaries fled Nimroz following U.S. airstrikes on 13 November 2001, and his office was taken over by Abdul Karim Brahui. After the Invasion of Afghanistan, Rasul became the Taliban's shadow governor of Farah Province.

== Afghan Civil War ==
In 2015, Rasul broke away from the main Taliban leadership and established his own group, the High Council of the Islamic Emirate of Afghanistan. The split was a result of disagreement over the ascension of Akhtar Mansour as leader of the Taliban. Rasul's followers accuse Mansour of hijacking the movement due to personal greed. Rasul says that he and his supporters tried to persuade him to step down and let the new leader be chosen by the Taliban council, but Mansour refused.

The High Council was suspected by some to be an Iranian ally, although Iran sided with the Islamic Emirate's leadership against it. They have demanded that foreign troops leave Afghanistan as a precursor for peace talks. Rasul's Taliban group has voiced that neither al-Qaeda, nor the Islamic State are welcome in Afghanistan. The group has also been reported of being supported by Afghan government though both the group and Afghan officials have denied this.

Rasul's faction dissolved peacefully into the main Taliban following the Taliban offensive of 2021, ending its independent existence and turning over all of its military equipment to the Taliban. In January 2022, Muhammad Rasul met with defense minister Mullah Yaqoob in Kabul and stated his support for the new government.

== Attack on Haibatullah ==
During the Friday prayer on August 16, 2019, a powerful blast tore through a grand mosque in Pakistan’s Balochistan province. The attack on the mosque, frequented by Taliban’s leadership, killed the brother and father of Hibatullah Akhundzada. The High Council of Afghanistan Islamic Emirate claimed responsibility for the attack, adding that the prime target was Haibatullah.

Preceded by Sher Malang	Governor of Nimruz Province ?–2001	Succeeded by Abdul Karim Brahui
