= Abdul Manan Niazi =

Afghan politician (died 2021)

- ملا عبدالمنان نیازی

Governor of Balkh

Governor of Herat

Personal details
- Born: 1968 Pashtun Zarghun, Herat, Kingdom of Afghanistan
- Died: 15 May 2021 (aged 52-53) Kabul, Afghanistan
- Profession: Politician

Mullah Abdul Manan Niazi (Pashto: ملا عبدالمنان نیازی; died 15 May 2021) was an Afghan politician and military commander. In the 1990s, he was the governor of the Herat and Balkh provinces. He was one of the famous commanders of the splinter group of the Taliban led by Mullah Rasool, and one of the helpers of the Taliban group led by Mullah Hibatullah Akhundzada. He was also a critic of the policy of regional countries, especially Iran and Pakistan, towards Afghanistan.

== Early life ==
Niazi was born in 1968 in Pashtun Zarghun. His family hailed from Kandahar. He studied at a madrassa.

== Islamic Emirate of Afghanistan ==
In the 1990s, he was the governor of the Herat and Balkh provinces. He was one of the famous commanders of the splinter group of the Taliban led by Mullah Rasool, and one of the opponents of the Taliban group led by Mullah Hibatullah Akhundzada. He had many times managed the bloody conflicts between these two groups. He was a critic of the policy of regional countries, especially Iran and Pakistan, towards Afghanistan.

On 8 August 1998, During his governorship, and following the fall of the city of Mazar-i-Sharif to the Taliban, the headquarters of the Iranian consulate in this city was attacked and its diplomats disappeared. It was later reported that these diplomats were killed. Iran declared the Taliban group responsible for the killing of these diplomats, but this group claimed at that time that the killing was carried out by "arbitrary forces".

The most criticisms against him go back to the time when it is said that he was the "governor" of Balkh Province during the rule of the Taliban Emirate in Afghanistan, precisely when this province was at war and was changing hands.

== Opinion on ethnic Hazaras ==
In an interview with the FRONTLINE, just over 2 week before his death, Niazi said "Inside Afghanistan, all the Hazaras are Fatemiyoun. I will kill Fatemiyoun and all others who are key players in the civil war in Afghanistan. I will kill thousands of Hazaras".

== Death ==
On 11 May 2021, He was severely wounded in an attack by Taliban militants in Kariz-e-Mikhi, in the border between Guzara and Adraskan districts. He died of his injuries on 15 May in a hospital in Kabul.
