= Arghandab =

Arghandab may refer to:

- Arghandab District, Kandahar of Afghanistan.
- Arghandab, Afghanistan, a town in the center of Arghandab District, Kandahar.
- Arghandab District, Zabul of Afghanistan.
- Arghandab River of Afghanistan.
