= Battle of Arghandab =

Battle of Arghandab may refer to:

- Battle of Arghandab (1987)
- Battle of Arghandab (2008)
