= List of jailbreaks by al-Qaeda affiliates =

In 2013 a succession of successful jailbreaks by al-Qaeda led INTERPOL to release a global alert calling for investigation of their role in jailbreaks in nine member countries. The following is a list of incidents in which sources have suggested the involvement of an al-Qaeda affiliate organization in attempted jailbreaks, though the involvement of the organization and its affiliation with al-Qaeda may remain uncertain. This list includes instances where officials have collaborated in the release of prisoners in exchange for the release of hostages taken for this purpose, whether they were taken within the prison or elsewhere.

Date	Freed	Dead	Injd	Location	Details	Affiliate
1999-12-24	3	1	17	(India) (Pakistan) (Afghanistan)	The hijacking of Indian Airlines Flight 814 was used to persuade Indian authorities to release three militants in Kandahar, Afghanistan, who subsequently crossed into Pakistan. These militants were Maulana Masood Azhar, who subsequently founded Jaish-e-Muhammed in 2000, Ahmed Omar Saeed Sheikh, convicted in the murder of Daniel Pearl, and Mushtaq Ahmed Zargar.	Harkat-ul-Mujahideen
2001-11-01	0	0	1	(United States); New York, USA	The FBI found evidence of a plan for an escape from the 10-South wing of the Metropolitan Correctional Center in New York. Despite warnings, Mamdouh Mahmud Salim found an opportunity to attack a lone guard while uncuffed to gather files for a meeting with his lawyer. Salim first blinded the guard, Louis Pepe, with a spray of hot sauce, then stabbed him through the eye into the brain with a sharpened plastic comb. Despite massive injury, the guard resolutely maintained his hold on the cellblock keys, defeating the escape. Salim had planned to make an escape to the United Nations and to take hostages to exchange for other prisoners.	al Qaeda (founding member)
2003-04-11	10	0	0	Aden, Yemen	Ten prisoners suspected of membership in either al-Qaeda or Al-Jihad, including Jamal al-Badawi and Fahd Al Qash, the two main suspects in the attack on the USS Cole (DDG-67), escaped from Al Mansourah prison in Aden, Yemen. At the time of the escape the small maximum-security prison held 85 inmates, and details of the escape were uncertain, but included cutting window bars.	
2003-10	41			Kandahar, Afghanistan	41 prisoners including the brother of the Afghani defense minister escaped through a tunnel from Sarposa Prison in southern Afghanistan. Guards were bribed to assist in the escape.	
2006-02-04	23	0	0	Sana'a, Yemen	A tunnel over 300 meters in length was dug from the women's prayer yard in Al-Awkaf Mosque to the cells of Political Security Central Prison in Sana'a. An official list of 22 suspected al-Qaeda members were reported to have escaped, most notably Jamal Badawi and Fawaz Al-Rabyee, and a Yemen newspaper reported that Mohammed Hamdi Al-Ahdal had also escaped on the eve of his trial and that of 14 other suspects for terrorist activities including an attack on the USS Cole (DDG-67).	
2008-06-14	1,200	15		Kandahar, Afghanistan	Thirty Taliban fighters and two suicide bombers attacked Sarposa Prison, the largest in southern Afghanistan, blowing up the prison's mud walls with an attack on the main gates, after which fighters armed with assault rifles and rocket-propelled grenades entered the prison, opening the cells.	Taliban
2010-07-20	4	0	0	Baghdad, Iraq	Four days after Americans handed over control of Camp Cropper to the Iraqi government, the warden of the prison and four senior al-Qaeda leaders drove out of the base.	
2011-04-25	488			Kandahar, Afghanistan	Over several months the Taliban dug a half-mile long, three-foot wide tunnel with electricity and air pipes from a nearby house to a cell in Sarposa Prison. Guards left the inner cell doors open and did not check on the prisoners during the night, permitting nearly 500 to pass through the tunnel.	Taliban
2011-06-22	62	1	2	Mukalla, Yemen	Militants opened fire on the gates of al-Munawara prison in southern Yemen, killing one guard and wounding two. Meanwhile, 62 inmates, many suspected to be al-Qaeda members, used the distraction to escape through a tunnel. Nasser Bakazzuz, speaking for NGOs in Hadramawt, accused the authorities of lying about the attack and simply releasing the prisoners.	Al Qaeda in the Arabian Peninsula suspected
2011-09-01	35			Mosul, Iraq	35 prisoners crawled to freedom through a sewage pipe from a temporary prison in Iraq. Of these, 21 were rapidly recaptured with the help of U.S. aerial reconnaissance. The prisoners were local Iraqi militants rather than foreign fighters, leaving doubt whether they were associated with al-Qaeda.	undetermined
2011-12-12	14	0	0	Aden, Yemen	14 detainees awaiting trial, including 12 alleged al-Qaida militants, escaped through a tunnel somewhere between six meters and 130 feet in length from the west end of Aden's central jail.	
2012-01-15	0	13	10	Ramadi, Iraq	A series of coordinated attacks took place in Ramadi as at least six suicide bombers stormed a counter terrorism unit building in an attempt to free several senior al-Qaeda prisoners. Several car bombings and roadside bombs exploded before and during the suicide attack, which is the latest in a series of incidents during January.	
2012-02-16	119			Kogi State, Nigeria	On 16 February attackers stormed a prison in the central Kogi State, killing the warden and releasing 119 inmates, most of them members of Boko Haram.	Boko Haram
2012-02-24	0	12	1	Gombe, Nigeria	Unidentified gunmen set off bombs in an attempt to help inmates break out of a prison in the northeast city of Gombe. After a lengthy firefight the attackers bombed a local police station, killing two officers. At least 10 others were killed in the violence, most of them civilians. Because this followed the week after another Boko Haram associated jailbreak, the group was suspected of involvement even though none of the prisoners were known to be members.	Boko Haram; Suspected
2012-08-05	0	0	0	Abu Ghraib, Iraq	Guards discovered a 20-meter tunnel, dug with a frying pan and a broken ceiling fan by prisoners described as 'al-Qaeda terrorists', when a guard heard the banging and scraping of the tools from under the concrete in the middle of the night. The tunnel included an air tube made out of drinks cans. The guards flushed the diggers out of the tunnel by filling it with water.	Islamic State of Iraq
2012-09-28	50+	16		Tikrit, Iraq	After exploding a car bomb at the main gate of the prison, gunmen dressed in police uniforms driving police vehicles entered an Iraqi jail and attacked the guards, killing 12. They destroyed all of the prison documents including photos and identification documents, making it difficult for authorities to determine who had been released. Of the 300 prisoners present before the raid, at least 50 were at large the next day. The death toll increased to 16 in ensuing combat, and credit was taken by the Islamic State of Iraq which is the Iraqi wing of al-Qaeda.	Islamic State of Iraq
2013-02-22	127	25	--	Ganye, Nigeria	Unidentified gunmen attacked at least 13 locations in Ganye, a city in Nigeria's northeastern Adamawa State, including the local police HQ, a bank and several local bars. At least 25 people were killed in the two-hour assault, including the deputy chief of the local prison, where 127 inmates were freed.	Boko Haram; Suspected
2013-06-01	22	2	3	Niamey, Niger	Inmates at a prison in Niger's capital Niamey attempted to escape, killing two guards and injuring three others. Authorities were investigating how the group managed to get heavy weapons inside the building, which houses members of Boko Haram and other Islamist groups. On June 3, a government spokesman announced that a total of 22 people had escaped from the facility, including a member of AQIM.	Boko Haram/MOJWA; Suspected
2013-07-21	500	50+		Abu Ghraib and Taji, Iraq	Raids on the Abu Ghraib and Taji prisons released over 500 inmates. The Interior Ministry said that some of the guards had helped in the prison break from Abu Ghraib. More than 50 people, including 26 guards and Iraqi soldiers, were killed in the attack. The ministry's statement read: "There has been a conspiracy between some of the guards of both prisons and the terrorist gangs that attacked the prisons. That was one of the main reasons for the escalation of events which led to these consequences." The Ministry of Justice, meanwhile, said that 260 prisoners escaped from Abu Ghraib; of the 500 original escapees about 150 had been recaptured.	Islamic State of Iraq and the Levant
2013-07-27	1,117	?		Benghazi, Libya	1,117 prisoners escaped from Kuafiya prison after a riot and an external attack on the prison. Interpol requested investigation of whether the event was linked to al-Qaeda jailbreaks occurring that week.	
2013-07-29	250	12	8	Dera Ismail Khan, Pakistan	Fighters armed with mortars and grenades detonated small bombs to destroy the prison's perimeter fence and then took part in a firefight with security forces while chanting Allahu Akbar and "Long Live the Taliban." As a result of the raid, about 250 prisoners were freed and the dead included six police. A senior government official, Mushtaq Jadoon, said that "Police and other law enforcing agencies are busy in clearing the jail" and that a curfew was imposed on the city with residents asked to stay at home. The Pakistani military also deployed its forces to respond to the raid.	Pakistani Taliban
2019-10-13	859	0	unknown	Ayn Issa, Syria	859 ISIS members escaped after attacking guards and overrunning the main gate.	Islamic State of Iraq and the Levant
2019-10-17	2	0	0	Qamishli, Syria	two Belgian ISIS fighters escaped from an SDF prison after a Turkish artillery shell hit the prison yard.	Islamic State of Iraq and the Levant
2020-08-02-3	768	29	50	Jalalabad, Afghanistan	Jalalabad prison attack- Isis attack a prison in Jalalabad with a suicide bombing then attacked with fighter the battle for the prison lasted 20 hours in which 768 prisoners escaped.	Islamic State of Iraq and the Levant – Khorasan Province
2020-10-20	1,335	2	0	Beni, Democratic Republic of the Congo	1,335 prisoners escaped after ISCAP attacked Kangbayi central prison and a military camp defending it. Only 100 prisoners remained after the attack and 20 were recaptured.	Islamic State's Central Africa Province
2021-3-05	400	7	unknown	Bosaso, Somalia	400 prisoners were freed when al Shabaab stormed a jail in Bosaso, seven soldiers were killed in the attack.	Al-Shabaab
2024-7-13	500	8	18	Mogadishu, Somalia	2024 Mogadishu prison attack- Al-Shabaab claimed they freed 500 prisoners during the attempted jailbreak.	Al-Shabaab
