= Mullah Borjan =

Afghan Taliban commander (1958–1996)

- Native name: ملا بورجان
- Born: c.1958 Talkan, Panjwai district, Kingdom of Afghanistan
- Died: 27 September 1996 (aged 37–38) Kabul, Afghanistan
- Buried: Kandahar Province
- Allegiance: Hezb-i Islami Khalis; Taliban
- Service years: 1994-1996 (Taliban)
- Conflicts: See list: Soviet–Afghan War; Battle of Arghandab (1987); Afghan Civil War (1992–1996); Battle of Kabul (1992–1996) †

Mullah Borjan (Pashto/Dari: ملا بورجان; 1958 – 27 September 1996), also known as Mullah Aminullah, was an Afghan Taliban militant commander. He was considered to be an influential militant leader in Kandahar Province.

== Early life and education ==
Born in Talkan in 1958, Borjan hailed from a family with a religious background. His father was Haji Mullah Muhammad Sadiq, while his grandfather was Mullah Muhammad Musa Jan. Borjan finished his primary and secondary education in local schools and mosques.

== Military career ==
=== Soviet-Afghan War ===
At the age of 25, Borjan dropped out of school and joined the mujahideen group led by Mullah Haji Muhammad Akhund in Panjwayi. The group was affiliated with Mohammad Yunus Khalis. He waged guerilla wars against the Soviet and Afghan forces both daytime and night. Furthermore, he planned and commanded Mujahideen's attack on the Soviet military center in Kandahar, which caused casualties to Soviet soldiers.

In 1987, Borjan participated in the Battle of Arghandab against the Soviet forces led by Boris Gromov in which he managed to lift the 33-day siege of Mullah Naqib forces base. Although he managed to break the siege, he got injured due to a landmine explosion. Other than that, he also got injured during the battle against Soviet forces in Mohallajat area in 1987.

=== Taliban ===
Borjan joined the Taliban in 1994. At first, he was assigned as Kandahar police chief and later became the group's commander-in-chief. He was considered to be Mullah Omar's closest friend. He commanded Taliban troops during Battle of Kabul and the fall of Jalalabad on 11 September 1996. While leading the battle in the Kabul region, he was wounded in a skirmish in Char Asiab on 14 February 1995, causing him to be transported to Kandahar for medical treatment. Furthermore, he also freed the Pakistan convoy heading to Kandahar from Amir Lalai's militia hostage in 1994 and gave safe passage to Abdul Ali Mazari and his forces to flee Kabul. In 1995, Borjan headed the talks with UN Special Envoy Mahmoud Mestiri, and he demanded that the Taliban become the group that took control of Kabul before the transfer of power. As a group commander, he preferred to conduct military operations before night to prevent collateral damage and called for war continuation until the central government collapsed.

== Death ==
He died on 27 September 1996. There are three versions of Borjan's death. According to the Taliban, Borjan was killed by Rabbani's tank shelling. Meanwhile, according to Bette Dam, Borjan was shot by a sniper on the road heading to Jalalabad and his death upset Mullah Omar, making him abstain from eating for three days. A US source stated that Rabbani was the person behind the assassination of Borjan since Rabbani disagreed with Borjan's proposal to bring Mohammad Najibullah to trial. Previously, Borjan said to Pakistani journalists that ISI asked him to immediately execute Najibullah when the Taliban captured Kabul. According to Carlotta Gall, Borjan was killed by his bodyguard. Later, Borjan was buried in Kandahar Province.

== Legacy ==
The locals venerated Borjan's grave because of his strength. Many pilgrims visited his grave to do Ziyarat, hoping for a blessing.

== Bibliography ==
- Dam, Bette (2021). Looking for the Enemy: Mullah Omar and the Unknown Taliban. India: HarperCollins India.
- Gall, Carlotta (2014). The Wrong Enemy: America in Afghanistan, 2001-2014. Boston: Mariner Books. ISBN 978-0-544-53856-6.
- Maley, William (1998). Fundamentalism Reborn?: Afghanistan Under the Taliban. New York: NYU Press.
- Qazizai, Fazelminallah; Sands, Chris (2019). Night Letters: Gulbuddin Hekmatyar and the Afghan Islamists Who Changed the World. London: Hurst. ISBN 9781787381964.
