= Ghazni prison escape =

Prison break in 2015

2015 Ghazni prison escape
- Part of the War in Afghanistan (2001–2021)
- Ghazni province location
Date	14 September 2015
Location	Ghazni, Afghanistan
Result	Taliban victory: More than 355 prisoners escaped

Belligerents
(Islamic Republic of Afghanistan) Afghan National Police	(Afghanistan) Taliban militants

Casualties and losses
4 policemen killed	7 militants killed

Taliban militants, wearing Afghan army uniform, stormed a prison outside the city of Ghazni in Afghanistan on 14 September 2015, freeing more than 355 inmates (out of 436 housed at the prison). At least 148 of the escapees were considered to be a serious threat to national security. According to the Afghan Ministry of Interior, of the inmates who escaped, 148 had been jailed for attacks on security forces, while 207 had been convicted for other crimes. Only three prisoners had been recaptured.

== Raid ==
"Around 2:30 am six Taliban insurgents wearing military uniforms attacked Ghazni prison. First they detonated a car bomb in front of the gate, fired an RPG and then raided the prison"

— deputy provincial governor Mohammad Ali Ahmadi said

Gunmen and three suicide bombers attacked the prison early in the morning of 14 September 2015. A Taliban spokesperson said that the group had carried out the attack and that gunmen and three suicide bombers were involved.

== Outcome ==
At least four police guards were killed and seven others were wounded, and three Taliban fighters were also killed in the early morning battle. The interior ministry stated that 355 of the prison's 436 inmates escaped. Most were charged with crimes against national security and other criminal offences.

== Responsibility of the attack ==
"This successful operation was carried out at 2:00am and continued for several hours. The jail was under Taliban control. In this operation, 400 of our innocent countrymen were freed ... and were taken to mujahideen-controlled areas."

— Taliban spokesman Zabihullah Mujahid said in a statement taking responsibility for the attack.

Taliban spokesman Zabihullah Mujahid assumed the responsibility for the attacks.

== See also ==
- Sarposa prison attack of 2008
- Sarposa prison tunneling escape of 2011
