= Jalander =

Jalander is a surname. It is also a masculine given name. Notable people with the name are as follows:

== Surname ==
- Bruno Jalander (1872–1966), Finnish military officer and politician
- Y. W. Jalander (1874–1955), Finnish pharmacist

== Given name ==
- Baba Jalandar Panjshiri, Afghan member of Jamiat-e Islami

== Fictional characters ==
- Jalander Fazer, known as Jal Fazer, character in the television series Skins (British TV series)
