= Battle of Kabul (1992–1996) =

Series of intermittent battles during the Afghan Civil War

- Part of the Afghan Civil War (1992–1996)
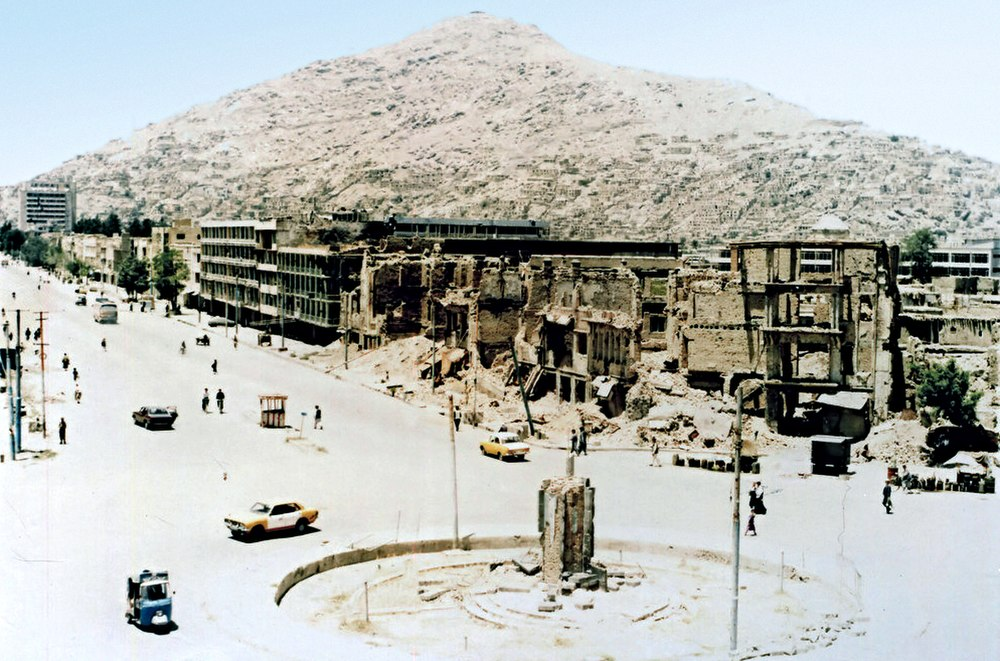
- Kabul's Jada-e Maiwand in 1993
Date	April 28, 1992 – September 27, 1996 (4 years, 5 months, 2 weeks and 3 days)
Location	Kabul, Afghanistan
Result	Taliban victory; Taliban control Kabul along with 80 percent of the country; Massoud and Rabbani's United Front controls 20 percent of the country; Establishment of the First Islamic Emirate of Afghanistan; Continuation of the Afghan Civil War

Belligerents
Islamic State of Afghanistan: Jamiat-e Islami; (Afghanistan) Shura-e Nazar; (Afghanistan) Jebh-e Nejat-e Melli; (Afghanistan) Harakat-i-Inqilab; (Afghanistan) Harakat-i Islami; (Afghanistan) Ittehad-e Islami; Hezb-e Islami Khalis (until mid-1992); Hezb-i Wahdat (until Dec. 1992) Junbish-i Milli (until 1994)	Hezb-e Islami Gulbuddin (until late 1994) Hezb-i Wahdat (after Dec. 1992) (Afghanistan) Junbish-i Milli (Jan.–Aug. 1994)	Taliban (from late 1994); Al-Qaeda

Commanders and leaders
Burhanuddin Rabbani (Afghanistan) Ahmad Shah Massoud (Afghanistan) Sibghatullah Mojaddedi (Afghanistan) Mohammad Nabi Mohammadi (Afghanistan) Hussain Anwari (Afghanistan) Abdul Rasul Sayyaf; Abdul Haq Abdul Ali Mazari; Karim Khalili (Afghanistan) Abdul Rashid Dostum	Gulbuddin Hekmatyar Abdul Ali Mazari; Commander Shafi Hazara (Afghanistan) Abdul Rashid Dostum	Mullah Omar; Mullah Borjan †

Strength
		25,000 (1996)
- Wahdat worked with the Islamic government of Afghanistan until it withdrew in late 1992 joining Hezb-i Islami. Dostum, previously allied with Massoud, joined forces with Hekmatyar in 1994. Harakat, remaining allied to Jamiat, generally fought with Wahdat against Ittehad; however, occasionally it fought against Wahdat as well. In 1995 Massoud and the ISA forces were able to control most of Kabul. Pakistan stopped support to Hekmatyar in 1995, and supported the Taliban instead. Without Pakistani support, and with the arrival of the Taliban, Hekmatyar stopped fighting against the Islamic State of Afghanistan.

The Battle of Kabul was a series of intermittent battles and sieges over the city of Kabul during the period of 1992–1996.

Throughout the Soviet–Afghan War from 1979 to 1989, and subsequent civil war (1989–1992) the city of Kabul saw little fighting. The collapse of Mohammad Najibullah's regime in April 1992 led to a peace treaty between the Afghan political parties and the establishment of the Islamic State of Afghanistan. But soon after, the undisciplined commanders from both former mujahideen and Communist ranks started to vie for power, abetted by foreign powers, namely Pakistan, Saudi Arabia, Iran and Uzbekistan, who began arming their Afghan proxies to fight for control and influence.

== Political background ==
With the breakup of the Soviet Union in 1991, the Soviet-supported Pashtun government of Najibullah would lose credibility amongst Afghanistan's non-Pashtun population following the replacement of Tajik generals in the North with Pashtun ones leading to General Abdul Rashid Dostum and the newly found Anti Pashtun alliance of Northern militias called the Movement of the North would ally Ahmed Shah Massoud and Abdul Ali Mazari, and began to take control of Mazar Sharif from the Pashtun defenders. The capture of Mazar and the large quantities of weapons there crippled Najibullah's government and by April 14, 1992, Massoud and his forces took control of Charikar and Jabalussaraj in Parwan Province with many Tajik Parchamites defecting while Pashtun Khalqists and Najibullah loyalists put up resistance. At this point, it was reported that Massoud had approximately 20,000 troops stationed around Kabul. By mid-April, the air force command at Bagram capitulated to Massoud. With no army to defend it, Kabul had become completely helpless.

As soon as he announced his willingness, on March 18, to resign in order to make way for a neutral interim government, Najibullah immediately lost control. As the government broke into several factions, the issue was how to carry out a transfer of power to a new government. Najibullah resigned on April 14 and attempted to leave Kabul on April 17, but was stopped by Dostum's troops, who controlled Kabul International Airport. Najibullah then took refuge at the United Nations mission where he remained until 1996. A group of Parchami generals and officials, led by acting President Abdul Rahim Hatif, declared themselves an interim government for the purpose of handing over power to Tajik warlord Ahmad Shah Massoud. However many Pashtun Khalqists and Najibullah loyalists opposed this and would enter an alliance with Gulbuddin Hekmatyar's Hezb-e Islami.

Massoud hesitated to enter Kabul, waiting for the political parties to reach a peace and power-sharing agreement first. In April 1992, the Peshawar Accord was signed. It established the Islamic State of Afghanistan and stipulated that an interim government would be formed with a supreme leadership council. A transitory presidency was given to Sibghatullah Mojaddedi for two months, after which Burhanuddin Rabbani was to succeed him. Gulbuddin Hekmatyar was given the post of prime minister, but he did not accept this position as he did not want to share power and Pakistan was urging him to take power for himself. Massoud, in a recorded conversation, tried to convince Hekmatyar to join the peace agreement and not to enter Kabul. But Hekmatyar replied he would enter the capital with "our naked sword. No-one can stop us". Hekmatyar's Hezb-i Islami forces with assistance of their new communist allies began to infiltrate Kabul. This forced Massoud to advance on the capital in order to preserve the Peshawar Accord and prevent the establishment of a Hekmatyar dictatorship.

Eleven armed groups in total entered Kabul and its vicinities, which included the seven Sunni Afghan mujahideen; the Shi'ite Islamic Movement of Asif Mohseni and Hezbe Wahdat of Abdul Ali Mazari; and the Junbish-i Milli of ex-communist Abdul Rashid Dostum. The different groups entered the city in different directions. Hezb-i Islami made the first move and entered the city from the south. With soldiers armed and financed by Pakistan, Hekmatyar had asked other groups such as Harakat-Inqilab-i-Islami and the Khalis faction to join him while entering Kabul, but they declined his offer and instead backed the Peshawar Accord. Jamiat-i Islami had seized massive amount of weapons while overrunning the mostly Pashtun Communist garrisons in Bagram, Charikar, Takhar, Kunduz, Fayzabad and other northern cities. Adding to that, all the forces of Junbish-i Milli had aligned themselves to the Jamiat, and the former Communist government of Afghanistan had decided to surrender all its weapons to Jamiat, instead of Hezb. All the Parchamis had fled abroad through the Jamiat-controlled areas. Jamiat had seized massive stockpiles of heavy weapons such as T-62 and T-55 tanks, Scud missiles and MiG-21s.

Hekmatyar's Hezb forces were very far from key points of the city such as the presidential palace, the prime minister's office, Kabul International Airport, the ministry of defense and many other important government offices. Much of the city lies on the North Bank of the Kabul River. Burhanuddin Rabbani's Jamiat forces quickly took control of these strategically important offices. Although Hezb forces got to the gates of the ministry of justice and took control of the ministry of the interior, they were quickly repulsed after bombing from the Afghan Air Force, which was supported by artillery shells fired from a TV tower onto Jade Maiwand. Hundreds of Hezb fighters were killed or taken prisoners, including some foreign fighters.

In the western sector of the city, the Hezb forces crossed the Kabul River and arrived at the northern bank after taking control of the Karte Seh area. While charging towards the Kote Sangi and Kabul University, Sayyaf's forces attacked Hezb forces from the Ghazi School area in a surprise move, and the Hezb forces were separated into two groups after being cut off by Jamiat troops. Throughout the night, the exhausted and demoralized forces of Hezbi Islami fought. After suffering heavy casualties, Hezb forces on the southern bank deserted their positions, fleeing out of Kabul towards Logar.

Kabul came completely under Islamic State control on April 30, 1992, but the situation was far from stabilised. The Hezb-i Islami had been driven out, but they were still within artillery range, and soon started firing tens of thousands of Pakistan-supplied rockets into the city.

When Hekmatyar's forces had overrun Pul-e-Charkhi prison, while still in the centre of Kabul, they had set free all the inmates, including many criminals who were able to take arms and commit gruesome actions against the population. With the government institutions either collapsing or participating in the factional fighting, maintaining order in Kabul became almost impossible. The scene was set for the next phase of the war.

== Timeline ==
=== 1992 ===
April–May

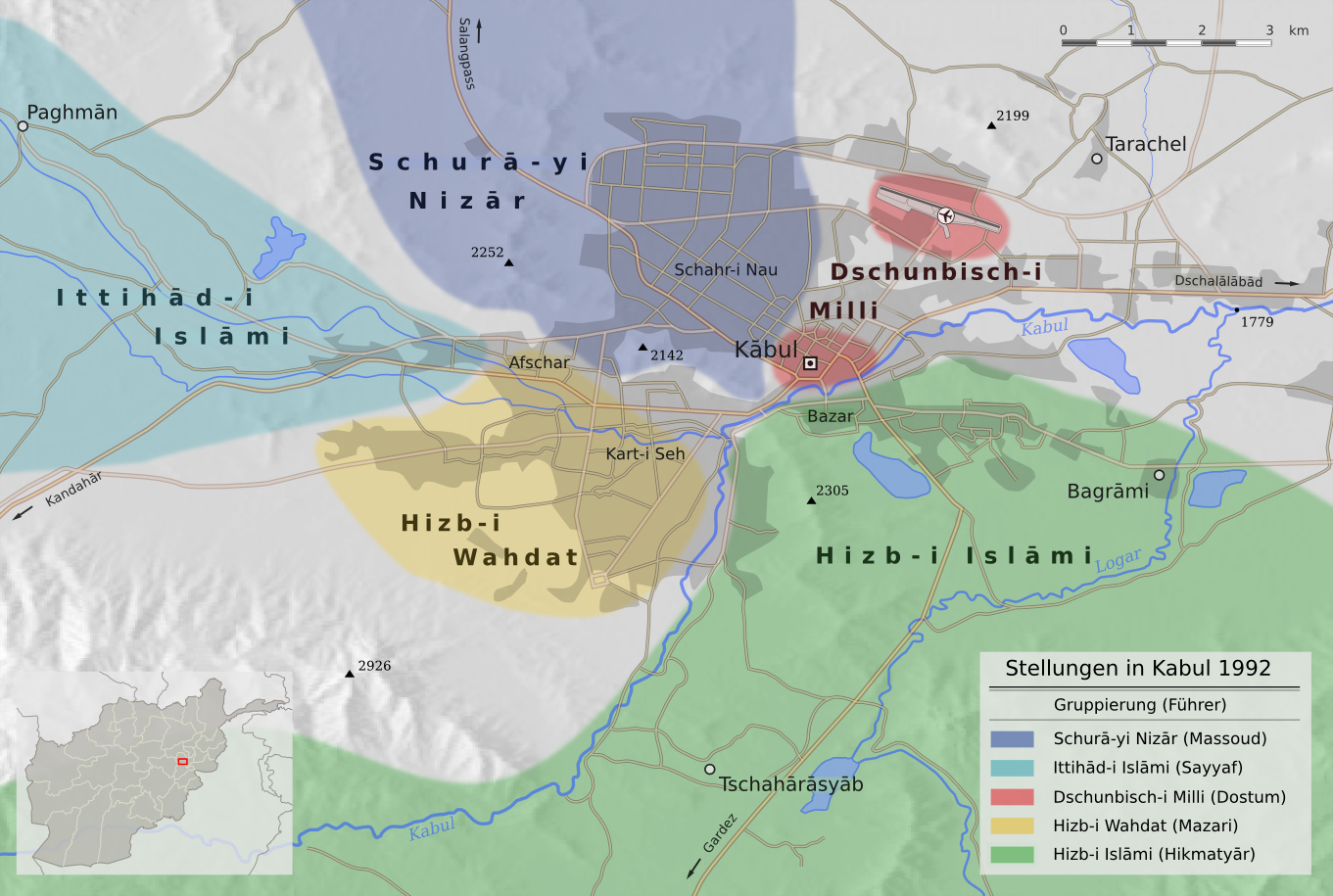
Control in Kabul in April 1992

The immediate objective of the interim government was to defeat the forces acting against the peace agreement (the Peshawar Accord), particularly Hekmatyar's Hezb-i Islami (backed by Pakistan) but later to include Mazari's Wahdat (backed by Iran) and Dostum's Junbish (backed by Uzbekistan).

The forces of Jamiat and Shura-e Nazar entered the city, with agreement from Nabi Azimi and the commander of the Kabul garrison, General Abdul Wahid Baba Jan, that they would enter the city through Bagram, Panjshir, Salang and Kabul Airport. Many government forces, including generals, joined Jamiat, including the troops of General Baba Jan, who was at the time in charge of the garrison of Kabul. On April 27, all major parties had entered the city.

Meanwhile, in Western Kabul, an area that would later see some of the fiercest fighting and greatest massacres of the war, Sayyaf's mostly Pashtun forces began to enter the city from Paghman and Maidan Shar.

As mentioned above, Kabul came completely under the control of the interim government on April 30, 1992, and hopes were rising for a new era. But the situation was far from stabilized. The Hezb-i Islami had been driven out, but they were still within artillery range, and soon started firing tens of thousands of rockets into the city. Fighting between Hezb-i Islami and Junbish occurred in the Shashdarak area of Kabul. On May 5–6, 1992, Hizb-i Islami subjected Kabul to a heavy artillery bombardment, killing and injuring an unknown number of civilians. On May 23, 1992, despite a cease-fire, the forces of Junbish-i Milli bombarded Hizb-i Islami positions in Bini Hissar, Kalacha and Kart-iNau.

Peace talks on May 25, 1992, originally agreed to give Hekmatyar the position of prime minister. However, this lasted less than a week after Hekmatyar had attempted to shoot down the plane of President Sibghatullah Mojaddedi. Furthermore, as part of the peace talks, Hekmatyar was demanding the departure of Dostum's forces, which would have tilted the scales.

On May 30, 1992, during fighting between the forces of Junbish-i Milli and Hizb-i Islami in the southeast of Kabul, both sides used artillery and rockets killing and injuring an unknown number of civilians. Shura-e Nazar forces were said to have been around the customs post on Jalalabad Road under the command of Gul Haidar and Baba Jalandar, who also were active in the areas such as the military university.

June–July

In June 1992, as scheduled, Burhanuddin Rabbani became President of Afghanistan.

From the onset of the battle, Jamiat and Shura-e Nazar controlled the strategic high areas, and were thus able to develop a vantage point within the city from which opposition forces could be targeted. Hekmatyar continued to bombard Kabul with rockets. Although Hekmatyar insisted that only Islamic Jihad Council areas were targeted, the rockets mostly fell over the houses of innocent civilians of Kabul, a fact which has been well-documented. Artillery exchanges quickly broke out, escalating in late May-early June. Shura-i Nazar was able to immediately benefit from heavy weapons left by fleeing or defecting government forces and launched rockets on Hekmatyar's positions near the Jalalabad Customs Post, and in the districts around Hood Khil, Qala-e Zaman Khan and near Pul-i Charkhi prison. On June 10, it was reported that Dostum's forces had also begun nightly bombardments of Hezb-i Islami positions.

Particularly noticeable in this period was the escalation of the fight in West Kabul between the Shi'a Wahdat forces supported by Iran and those of the Wahhabist Ittihad militia supported by Saudi Arabia. Wahdat was somewhat nervous about the presence of Ittihad posts which were deployed in Hazara areas such as Rahman Baba High school. According to reports by Nabi Azimi, who at the time was a high ranking governor, the fighting began on May 31, 1992, when four members of Hezb-e Wahdat's leadership were assassinated near the Kabul Silo. Those killed were Karimi, Sayyid Isma'il Hosseini, Chaman Ali Abuzar and Vaseegh, the first three being members of the party's central committee. Following this, the car of Haji Shir Alam, a top Ittihad commander, was stopped near Pol-e Sorkh, and although Alem escaped, one of the passengers was killed. On June 3, 1992, heavy fighting between forces of Ittihad-i Islami and Hizb-I Wahdat in West Kabul broke out. Both sides used rockets, killing and injuring civilians. On June 4, interviews with Hazara households stated that Ittihad forces looted their houses in Kohte-e Sangi, killing six civilians. The gun battles at this time had a death toll of over 100 according to some sources. On June 5, 1992, further conflicts between forces of Ittihad and Hizb-i Wahdat in West Kabul were reported. Here, both sides used heavy artillery, destroying houses and other civilian structures. Three schools were reportedly destroyed by bombardment, and an unknown number of civilians were injured or killed. Gunmen were reported killing people in shops near the Kabul Zoo. On June 24, 1992, the Jamhuriat hospital located near the interior ministry was bombed and closed. Jamiat and Shura-e Nazar forces sometimes joined the conflict when their positions came under attack by Wahdat forces and in June and July bombarded Hizb-i Wahdat positions in return. Harakat forces also sometimes joined the fight.

August–December

In the month of August, a bombardment of artillery shells, rockets and fragmentation bombs killed over 2,000 people in Kabul, most of them civilians. On August 1 the airport was attacked by rockets. One hundred and fifty rockets were launched the following day, and according to one author, these missile attacks killed as many as 50 people and injured 150. In the early morning on August 10 Hezb-e Islami forces attacked from three directions—Chelastoon, Darulaman and Maranjan mountain. A shell also struck a Red Cross hospital. On April 10–11 nearly a thousand rockets hit parts of Kabul including about 250 hits on the airport. Some estimate that as many as 1,000 were killed, with the attacks attributed to Hekmatyar's forces. By August 20 it was reported that 500,000 people had fled Kabul. On August 13, 1992, a rocket attack was launched on Deh Afghanan in which cluster bombs were used. Eighty were killed and more than 150 injured, according to press reports. In response to this, Shura-e Nazar forces hit Kart-I Naw, Shah Shaheed and Chiilsatoon with aerial and ground bombardment. In this counterattack, more than 100 were killed and 120 wounded.

Hezb-i Islami was not, however, the only perpetrator of indiscriminate shelling of civilians. Particularly in West Kabul, Wahdat, Ittihad and Jamiat all have been accused of deliberately targeting civilian areas. All sides used non-precision rockets such as Sakre rockets and the UB-16 and UB-32 S-5 airborne rocket launchers.

In November, in a very effective move, Hekmatyar's forces, together with guerrillas from some of the Arab groups, barricaded a power station in Sarobi, 30 miles east of Kabul, cutting electricity to the capital and shutting down the water supply, which is dependent on power. His forces and other Mujahideen were also reported to have prevented food convoys from reaching the city.

On November 23, Minister of Food Sulaiman Yaarin reported that the city's food and fuel depots were empty. The government was now under heavy pressure. At the end of 1992 Hizb-i Wahdat officially withdrew from the government and opened secret negotiations with Hizb-I Islami. In December 1992, Rabbani postponed convening a shura to elect the next president. On December 29, 1992, Rabbani was elected as president and he agreed to establish a parliament with representatives from all of Afghanistan. Also notable during this month was the solidification of an alliance between Hezb-i Wahdat and Hezb-i Islami against the Islamic State of Afghanistan. While Hizb-i Islami joined in bombardments to support Wahdat, Wahdat conducted joint offensives, such as the one to secure Darulaman. On December 30, 1992, at least one child was apparently killed in Pul-i Artan by a BM21 rocket launched from Hezb-i Islami forces at Rishkor.

About the bombardments

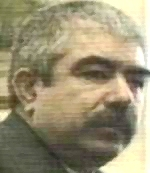
Abdul Rashid Dostum, leader of Junbish-i-Milli Islami Afghanistan

Throughout the war, the most devastating aspect of it remained the indiscriminate shelling of the city by Gulbuddin Hekmatyar and later Rashid Dostum. Although most sides engaged in bombardments, some were more indiscriminate in their targeting.

As Jamiat-i controlled the strategic high areas, they were better able to target specific military objectives rather than resorting to indiscriminate shelling as other factions such as Hezb-i Islami had done. According to the officer, the 3rd Regiment deployed in the Darulaman area, where Wahdat Corps had based their artillery commander, as well as the area near the Russian Embassy where Wahdat's Division 096, were particularly targeted by the long ranged rockets. Charasyab, which housed Hizb-i Islami's artillery, Shiwaki, where the intelligence department was deployed and the Rishkor Division were also targeted, in addition to the Dasht-I Saqawa airport in Logar Province.

By far the worst perpetrator of attacks against non-military targets were the forces of Hizb-i Islami. These included attacks against hospitals and a bombing attack on the headquarters of the International Red Cross. There was general indiscriminate bombing starting in August.

In 1994 the forces of Rashid Dostum were involved in indiscriminate shelling.

Kandahar at the same time

Kandahar was filled with three different local Pashtun commanders Amir Lalai, Gul Agha Sherzai and Mullah Naqib Ullah who engaged in an extremely violent struggle for power and who were not affiliated with the interim government in Kabul. The bullet-riddled city came to be a center of lawlessness, crime and atrocities fuelled by complex Pashtun tribal rivalries.

=== 1993 ===
January–February On January 3, 1993, Burhanuddin Rabbani, the leader of the Jamiat-i Islami Party, was sworn in as president. However, Rabbani's authority remained limited to only part of Kabul; the rest of the city remained divided among rival militia factions. On January 19, a short-lived cease-fire broke down when Hezb-i Islami forces renewed rocket attacks on Kabul from their base in the south of the city supervised by Commander Toran Kahlil. Hundreds were killed and wounded while many houses were destroyed in this clash between Hizb-i Islami and Jamiat-i Islami.

Heavy fighting was reported around a Wahdat post held by Commander Sayid Ali Jan near Rabia Balkhi girls' school. Most notable during this period was the rocket bombardments which would start against the residential area of Afshar. Some of these areas, such as Wahdat's headquarters at the Social Science Institute, were considered military targets, a disproportionate number of the rockets, tank shells and mortars fell in civilian areas. Numerous rockets were reportedly launched from Haider-controlled frontlines of Tap-I Salaam towards the men of Division 095 under Ali Akbar Qasemi. One attack during this time from Wahdat killed at least nine civilians. Further rockets bombardments took place on February 26, 1993, as Shura-e Nazar and Hezb-i Islami bombarded each other's positions. Civilians were the main victims in the fighting which killed some 1,000 before yet another peace accord was signed on March 8. However, the following day rocketing by Hekmatyar's Hezb-i Islami and Hezb-i Wahdat in Kabul left another 10 dead.

Afshar

The Afshar Operation was a military operation by Burhanuddin Rabbani's Islamic State of Afghanistan government forces against Gulbuddin Hekmatyar's Hezb-i Islami and Hezb-i Wahdat forces that took place in February 1993. The Iran-controlled Hezb-i Wahdat, together with the Pakistani-backed Hezb-i Islami of Hekmatyar, were shelling densely populated areas in Kabul from their positions in Afshar. To counter these attacks, Islamic State forces attacked Afshar in order to capture the positions of Wahdat, capture Wahdat's leader Abdul Ali Mazari and to consolidate parts of the city controlled by the government. The operation took place in a densely populated district of Kabul, the Afshar District. The Afshar District is situated on the slopes of Mount Afshar in West Kabul. The district is predominantly home to the Hazara ethnic group. The Ittihad troops of Abdul Rasul Sayyaf escalated the operation into a rampage against civilians. Both Ittihad and Wahdat forces severely targeted civilians in the war. The Wahhabist Ittihad supported by Saudi Arabia was targeting Shias, while the Iran-controlled Wahdat was targeting Sunni Muslims as well as their own people.

March–December

Under the March accord, brokered by Pakistan and Saudi Arabia, Rabbani and Hekmatyar agreed to share power until elections could be held in late 1994. Hekmatyar's condition had been the resignation of Massoud as minister of defense. The parties agreed to a new peace accord in Jalalabad on May 20 under which Massoud agreed to relinquish the post of defense minister. Massoud had resigned in order to gain peace. Hekmatyar at first accepted the post of prime minister but after attending only one cabinet meeting he left Kabul again starting to bomb Kabul leaving more than 700 dead in bombing raids, street battles and rocket attacks in and around Kabul. Massoud returned to the position of minister of defense to defend the city against the rocket attacks.

=== 1994 ===
January–June The war changed dramatically in January 1994. Dostum, for different reasons, joined with the forces of Gulbuddin Hekmatyar. Hezb-i Islami, along with their new allies of Wahdat and Junbish-i Milli, launched the Shura Hamaghangi campaign against the forces of Massoud and the interim government. During this, Hezb-i Islami was able make use of Junbish's air force in both bombing the positions of Jamiat and in resupplying their men. This led to greater artillery bombardment on behalf of Hezb-i Islami. Hezb-i Islami and Junbish were able to hold parts of central Kabul during this time. Junbish forces were particularly singled out for committing looting, rape and murder. Some commanders such as Shir Arab, commander of the 51st Regiment, Kasim Jangal Bagh, Ismail Diwaneh ["Ismail the Mad"], and Abdul Cherikwere particularly singled out. According to the Afghanistan Justice Project, during this period until June 1994, 25,000 people were killed. Areas around Microraion were particularly bloody. By now the population of Kabul had dropped from 2 million during Soviet times to 500,000 due to a large exodus from Kabul.

However, by the end of 1994 Junbish and Dostum were on the defensive, and Massoud's forces had ousted them from most of their strongholds. Massoud more and more gained control of Kabul. At the same time, Junbish was able to push Jamiat out of Mazar-e Sharif.

July–December Significant changes occurred in 1994 in how the war was conducted and who fought which side. The Taliban movement first emerged on the military scene in August 1994, with the stated goal of liberating Afghanistan from its present corrupt leadership of warlords and establishing a pure Islamic society. By October 1994, the Taliban movement had attracted the support of Pakistan, which was unhappy with the unsuccessful Hekmatyar, which saw in the Taliban a way to secure trade routes to Central Asia and establish a government in Kabul friendly to its interests. Pakistani traders who had long sought a secure route to send their goods to Central Asia quickly became some of the Taliban's strongest financial backers. The Pakistanis also wished for a stable government to take hold in Afghanistan, regardless of ideology, in hopes that the 3 million Afghans who for 15 years had taken refuge in Pakistan would return to their homeland since the refugee population became increasingly viewed as a burden.

In October 1994, a bomb struck a wedding ceremony in Qala Fathullah in Kabul, killing 70 civilians. No fighting had been witnessed in the area in several days according to reports.

Also in October 1994, the Taliban revolted in Kandahar, capturing the city on November 5, 1995, and soon going on to capture most of the south.

=== 1995 ===
The Taliban soon began to approach Kabul, capturing Wardak in early February and Maidshahr, the provincial capital on February 10, 1995. On February 14, 1995, Hekmatyar was forced to abandon his artillery positions at Charasiab due to the advance of the Taliban. The Taliban were therefore able to take control of this weaponry. In March, Massoud launched an offensive against Hezb-e Wahdat. Mazari allied himself with the Taliban, allowing them to enter Kabul, although many of Wahdat's forces joined Massoud instead. Massoud's forces heavily bombarded Western Kabul driving Wahdat out. According to other reports the forces of Jamiat-e Islami also committed mass rape and executions on civilians in this period. The Taliban retreated under this, taking Mazari with them and throwing him from a helicopter en route to Kandahar. The Taliban then continued to launch offensives against Kabul, using the equipment of Hezbe Islami. While the Taliban retreated, large amounts of looting and pillaging was said to have taken place in southwestern Kabul by the forces under Rabbani and Massoud.

In March 1995, Massoud's forces were able to drive out the Taliban from the area around Kabul, and retake Charasiab, leading to a relative period of calm for a few months. The battle left hundreds of Taliban dead and the force suffered its first defeat.

In October, the Taliban retook Charasiab. Between November 11–13, 1995, at least 57 unarmed civilians were killed and over 150 injured when rockets and artillery barrages fired from Taliban positions south of Kabul pounded the civilian areas of the city. On November 11, 36 civilians were killed when over 170 rockets as well as shells hit civilians areas. A salvo crashed into Foruzga Market. Rockets struck the Taimani District where many people from other parts of Kabul had settled. Other residential areas hit by artillery and rocket attacks were the Bagh Bala District in the northwest of Kabul and Wazir Akbar Khan where much of the city's small foreign community live.

On November 20, 1995, the forces of the Taliban gave the government a five-day ultimatum after which they would resume bombardment if Rabbani and his forces did not leave the city. This ultimatum was eventually withdrawn.

By the end of November and December, more than 150 people had died in Kabul due to the repeated rocketing, shelling and high-altitude bombing of the city, reportedly by Taliban forces.

=== 1996 ===
In September 1996 the Taliban seized Kabul. In its first action, the Islamic militant group publicly hanged former president Mohammad Najibullah and his brother General Shahpur Ahmadzai, perceiving them to be puppets loyal to nations other than Afghanistan. All key government installations appeared to be in the Taliban's hands within hours, including the presidential palace and the ministries of defense, security and foreign affairs. The Islamic Emirate of Afghanistan was proclaimed, securing recognition from Saudi Arabia, Pakistan, the United Arab Emirates and the partially recognized Chechen Republic of Ikheria. A rigidly strict version of Sharia was imposed upon the population.

Massoud's militia and other groups decided to retreat to the north to reduce civilian casualties. The United Islamic Front for the Salvation of Afghanistan, a coalition of various armed factions known in the Pakistani and Western media as the "Northern Alliance", was constituted in opposition to the Taliban under the leadership of Massoud.

== Bibliography ==
- Afghanistan Justice Project (2005). "Casting Shadows: War Crimes and Crimes Against Humanity, 1978–2001".
