= Baba Jalandar Panjshiri =

Baba Jullunder
- Born: Panjsher, Afghanistan
- Military career
- Allegiance: Jamiat-e Islami, Government of Afghanistan
- Branch: Mujahideen
- Service years: 1979–2004
- Rank: General
- Conflicts: Panjshir offensives 1980–1985, Battle of Kabul 1992, Fall of Kabul 2001

Baba Jalandar Panjshiri was a commander of Jamiat-e Islami during the Soviet invasion of Afghanistan and Civil War in Afghanistan. He was one of the senior commanders of Ahmed Shah Massoud and participated in the fighting that took place in Kabul from 1992 to 1996 between Government forces and militia of Gulbuddin Hekmatyar and Hezbe wahdat to control the capital, Along with Gul Haidar he took 3-month rotations in charge of the artillery located on top T.V. Mountain in Kabul against the opposition offensive toward Kabul. Units under his command were also involved in the Afshar Operation according to a Human Rights Watch report. The same report also stated that he commanded a brigade into Afshar during the assault.

One of his men, Rahimullah, deputy commander of brigade, under Baba Jalandar, controlled the areas behind the Ministry of Agriculture and Ali Abad Hospital, where he had an artillery brigade. He was accused of benefiting from the demolitions which occurred in Shirpur district of Kabul. He was director of the Afghanistan Red Crescent from late 2001 until 2004.
