= 2010 Nadahan bombing =

Suicide bombing in Kandahar Province, Afghanistan

Nadahan wedding bombing
- 2010 Nadahan bombing (Afghanistan)
- Location: 31°38′48″N 65°35′11″E; Nadahan, Arghandab District, Kandahar Province, Afghanistan
- Date: 9 June 2010; 16:30 (UTC)
- Attack type: Suicide bombing
- Weapon: Explosive belt
- Deaths: 40
- Injuries: 77
- Perpetrator: Unknown

A suicide bombing on a wedding party occurred on 9 June 2010 at around 21:00 local time (16:30 GMT) in the village of Nadahan in Arghandab District of Kandahar Province, Afghanistan. The attack killed at least 40 people and wounded at least 77 others. The Ottawa Citizen described it as "the most lethal attack in the south in recent memory."

== Bombing ==
The explosion occurred in a men-only area of the wedding party where guests were eating. The female guests were in another building. A white-clothed boy under 13 walked in and approached within 15 feet (4.6 m) of the dinner tables before fiddling with the bomb attached to his vest. There followed a "ball of fire and smoke." Some of those killed were children. The groom was wounded and his brother killed.

At least three Afghan police officers were at the wedding. Some suggested the attack was intended for 17 of the guests who were members of an anti-Taliban guard group, which had once been encouraged by United States Special Operations Forces before they gave up on it. Blood donations were requested via television. The coffins of the dead were lined adjacent to the mortuary.

== Investigation ==
A group of investigators was sent to the village by Afghanistan's Interior Ministry.

NATO issued a statement saying none of their soldiers were behind it. The Taliban were instead blamed by the NATO troops; however, the Taliban stated that they were not responsible for the attack, even condemning it as "a brutal act." Deputy commander of NATO forces, Lt. Gen. Nick Parker, described it as "ruthless violence" and claimed these were "sickening and indiscriminate tactics to try to intimidate the citizens of Afghanistan."

A military spokesperson representing the United States said the attack had not been an airstrike carried out by his country. He dismissed speculation to the contrary as "Taliban misinformation."

== Response ==
President Hamid Karzai stated his condemnation and requested "a thorough investigation." Karzai, in the presence of the United Kingdom's Prime Minister David Cameron (who was visiting Afghanistan for the first official time), labelled it "a crime of massive inhuman proportions."

Tooryalai Wesa, governor of Kandahar Province, spoke at a news conference in Nadahan after the attack and demonstrated a piece of metal he had found which he said resembled part of a suicide bomb.

United Nations Special Representative for Afghanistan Staffan de Mistura said it was an "outrageous act" and that "to specifically target people who were gathering at a moment of happiness to celebrate a wedding shows a total disregard for civilian life."
