= Battle of Arghandab (1987) =

Offensive in the Soviet–Afghan War

- Part of the Soviet–Afghan War
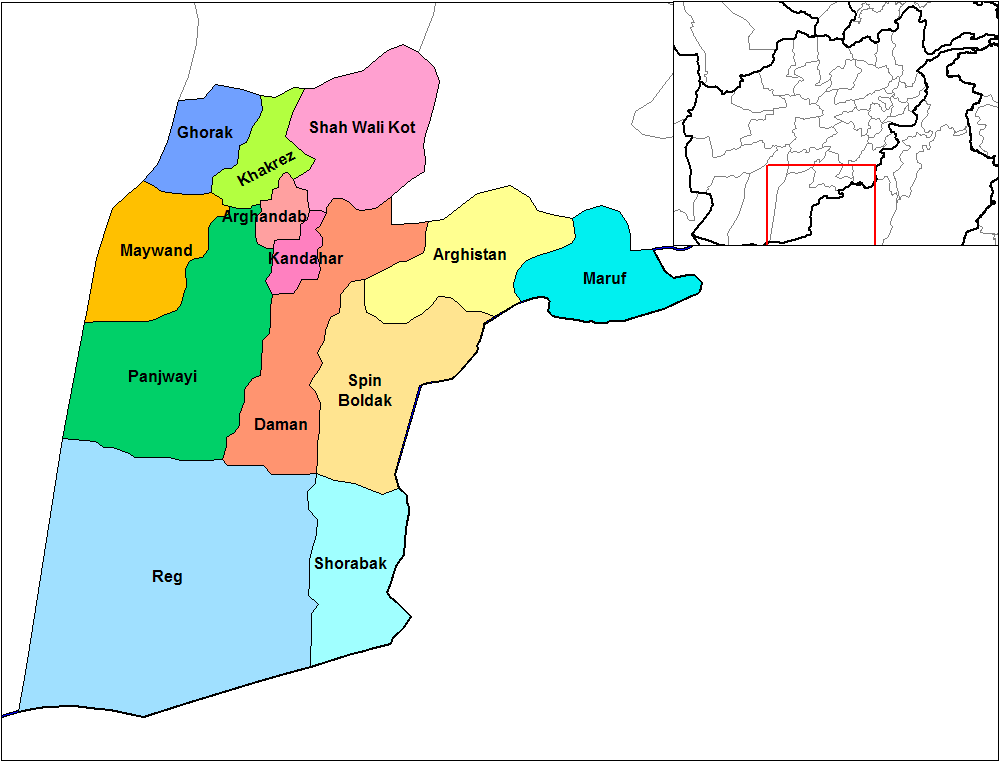
- Districts of Kandahar province
Date	May 22 – late June, 1987
Location	Arghandab District, Kandahar Province, Afghanistan
Result	Mujahideen victory

Belligerents
Afghanistan; Soviet Union	Afghan Mujahideen; Jamiat-e Islami; Hezb-e Islami Khalis; National Islamic Front; Pakistan

Commanders and leaders
(Afghanistan) Mohammed Rafie (Afghanistan) Abdul Rashid Dostum (Afghanistan) Ismatullah Muslim (Afghanistan) Meri Baluchis	Mullah Naqib; Lala Malang †; Abdul Latif; Mohammad Akhund; Mazullah Akhund

Units involved
(Soviet Union) 70th Motor Rifle Brigade (Afghanistan) 14th Division (Afghanistan) 15th Division (Afghanistan) 17th Division (Afghanistan) 7th Tank Brigade (Afghanistan) Local militia	Unknown

Strength
6,000	3,000

Casualties and losses
(Afghanistan) 500 casualties (Afghanistan) 1,200 deserted (Soviet Union) Unknown number of aircraft destroyed	At least 60 killed

The Battle of Arghandab was an offensive launched by Afghan government forces, supported by Soviet troops, against mujahideen strongholds in the Arghandab District of Kandahar Province, Afghanistan, in 1987. The operation ended in failure, and the government forces withdrew after suffering heavy losses.

== Prelude ==
During the Soviet–Afghan War, the Afghan mujahideen had important forces in the Kandahar area. These were affiliated with different parties and, while they cooperated with each other, they were unable to form a unified command. The principal commanders were Mullah Naqib of Jamiat-e Islami, Lala Malang of Hezb-e Islami Khalis and Abdul Latif of the National Islamic Front of Afghanistan. In early 1987, the mujahideen launched an attack in and around Kandahar. Diversionary raids targeted Soviet and WAD positions, but the main objective were the defensive outposts manned by pro-government militias defending the city. These were the Jowzjani Uzbek militia of Abdul Rashid Dostum, the Achakzai militia of Ismatullah Muslim, and a Baluch force under Meri Baluchis. The militias suffered heavily in the attack, causing the government to plan a retaliatory offensive against resistance strongholds in the Arghandab District.

== Battle ==
The Soviet–Afghan force that was organised for the circumstance was composed of 6,000 men drawn from the 15th Division and the 7th Tank Brigade, stationed near Kandahar, with reinforcements from the 14th and 17th Divisions, and from local militias and troops brought in from Kabul. The Soviets contributed the 70th Motorized Rifle Brigade and air units, but the bulk of the force was composed of Afghan forces, and the Soviet role was limited to support missions. The DRA Government sent its defense minister and interior minister to oversee the operation.

The terrain of Arghandab district presented several difficulties for an attacking force. Situated in a lush agricultural area along the Arghandab River, it is crossed by many deep irrigation ditches which limit and channelize the movement of armoured vehicles, as well as providing cover for the defenders.

The offensive began on May 22, supported by massive artillery and aviation strikes. After some aircraft were shot by mujahideen Stinger missiles, the Soviet helicopter gunships that had provided much of the air support were called off. The Afghan troops found themselves facing entrenched mujahideen, dug into camouflaged bunkers, and their morale suffered accordingly. The government troops often refused to attack, and large numbers defected to the resistance with their weapons. By the end of June, the offensive ended. The DRA losses were 500 killed and wounded, as well as 1200 defections. The mujahideen had 60 killed defending Chaharqulba, the stronghold of Mullah Naqib, and "many others" in other areas.
