= Gul Haidar =

Haji Gul Haidar Abdul Raza
- Born: 1962 (age 63–64); Panjsher, Afghanistan
- Military career
- Allegiance: Jamiat-e Islami, Government of Afghanistan
- Branch: Mujahideen, Afghan National Army
- Service years: 1979–present
- Rank: General

Gul Haider (or Gul Haidar) is a former mujahideen commander and official in the ministry of defense of Hamid Karzai's Afghan government.

== Military career ==
Born in the Panjshir Valley of Afghanistan, Gul Haidar joined the forces of Ahmed Shah Massoud at the age of 17, when the Soviets invaded Afghanistan in 1979. While serving as one of Massoud's commanders, Gul Haidar lost a leg to a mine, and Massoud sent him to London to receive an artificial limb, after which he returned to Afghanistan to continue the war.

During the Sieges of Kabul Gul Haidar controlled Gardana Kar-e Sakhi and lead the fighting that initially took place near the custom posts on the road to Jalalabad. According to one witness he controlled 40 RPG-7 rocket launchers, 10 82-mm mortars, 10 82-mm artillery pieces and 40 PK machine guns. In February–March 1993 he was known to control the Tapi-e Salaam area of Kabul as well where his forces fired mortars at the men of Ali Akbar Qasemi who was in the university area. According to one source he was manning the artillery at T.V. Mountain in three month rotations along with General Baba Jalandar. After the fall of Kabul in 1996 he remained loyal to Massoud, and was instrumental in preventing the Taliban from taking the Panjshir valley.

== Post-Taliban ==
General Gul Haidar commanded up to 1000 Afghan troops fighting alongside the Americans in the battles of Shah-e-Kot in Eastern Afghanistan in March 2002. He was at the time the Ministry of Defense Commander for 4 southern provinces including Paktika, Paktya and Ghazni. Since then he has largely traded in his guns for business and has become quite successful. He currently owns a mansion in Shirpur, an area where lower class housing was demolished to make room for houses of government officials.

== Relation with Abdullah Mujahid ==
Guantanamo detainee Abdullah Mujahid requested Haider as one of the witnesses who could refute the accusation that he was fired because he was suspected of collusion with anti-government forces. Haider was one of the members of a commission who recommended a promotion for Mujahid.
