= Sarposa prison attack of 2008 =

Taliban raid of Sarposa Prison in Kandahar, Afghanistan

Sarposa Prison attack
- Part of the War in Afghanistan (2001–2021)
- Kandahar (Afghanistan)
Date	June 13, 2008
Location	Kandahar, Afghanistan 31°37′08″N 65°40′05″E
Result	Taliban victory (1,200+ prisoners freed).

Belligerents
Islamic Republic of Afghanistan	(Afghanistan) Taliban

Casualties and losses
15 policemen killed	8 prisoners killed 2 suicide bombers detonated

The Sarposa Prison attack was a raid on the Sarposa Prison in Kandahar, Afghanistan by Taliban insurgents on June 13, 2008. One of the largest attacks by Afghan insurgents, the raid freed 400-1,000 prisoners. As of 2008, prison administration was overseen by Abdul Qabir.

== Followed unrest ==
In May 2008, 200 prisoners announced a hunger strike and 47 of the captives physically stitched their mouths shut to protest detention conditions. The strike ended when the Afghan parliament agreed to review their detentions; as some of them had been held for two years without charge, or faced summary trials they felt were unfair.

== Raid ==
On June 13, a suicide fuel truck drove right into the front gates of Sarposa prison at approximately 21:00 after nightfall. Although the truck failed to explode upon impact, the Taliban quickly improvised, igniting its fuel with an RPG, causing a massive explosion that breached the gate. Taliban fighters then stormed the prison, overpowering the surprised guards. A second suicide bomber was alleged to have walked to the back gates of the prison in the confusion, and detonated the explosives he was carrying, although later reports suggested the rear wall had not been breached. Insurgents fired rockets at the prison as the Taliban fighters broke in and a 30-minute battle began.

Over the next thirty minutes, a team of thirty insurgents aboard motorcycles fired AK-47s and RPGs into the prison. Several ran into the prison and began freeing prisoners who fled through the breached walls, and disappeared into nearby pomegranate and grape groves.

== Outcome ==
Wali Karzai, the brother of President Hamid Karzai who was president of Kandahar's provincial council, said the prison held about 350 suspected Taliban fighters.

He said "all" the prisoners escaped and that "There is no one left." The prisoners were aided by minibuses waiting for them outside the prison during the attack. Some 390 of the detainees were suspected Taliban fighters. Reports of people killed in the attack included police officers, 8 prisoners and the 2 suicide bombers.

Following reports of the mass escape, Canadian troops stationed at Kandahar Airfield were deployed to secure the prison and ISAF troops began a door-to-door search through Kandahar seeking escapees. ISAF forces became involved in several skirmishes that resulted in 20 Taliban deaths in Tabin, 16 in Khohak, and Arghandab, with 2 Afghan and 4 British soldiers killed in separate incidents, which led up to the Battle of Arghandab.

The Sarposa prison break and its aftermath dealt a significant blow to the Afghan government, prompting President Karzai to issue threats of sending Afghan troops into Pakistan to pursue Taliban leaders hiding there. In response to the debacle, the frustrated Karzai replaced both the provincial police chief and the governor of Kandahar. Tooryalai Wesa, a Barakzai with close ties to the Karzai family, was appointed as the new governor. Concerned about the worsening situation in southern Afghanistan, General David McKiernan redirected the 2nd Battalion, 2nd Infantry Regiment to bolster defenses in western Kandahar.

== See also ==
- Sarposa Prison tunneling escape
