= Shawali Khan =

Afghan Guantanamo Bay detainee

- Born: 1963 (age 62–63); Kandahar
- Arrested: 2001-11-13; Kandahar; Gul Agha Sherzai
- Citizenship: Afghanistan
- Detained at: Guantanamo
- ISN: 899
- Charge: no charge extrajudicial detention
- Status: repatriated 2014-12-20
- Occupation: shopkeeper

Shawali Khan is a citizen of Afghanistan, who was held in extrajudicial detention in the United States Guantanamo Bay detainment camps, in Cuba. His Guantanamo Internment Serial Number was 899. American intelligence analysts estimate he was born in 1963, in Kandahar, Afghanistan.

US District Court Judge John D. Bates, who has reviewed Shawali's confidential file, wrote that all the allegations he faced were based on "multiple levels of hearsay", that "all of the information contained in the reports could come from a single individual" and that "no source is identified by name." Shahwali Khan's lawyer Leonard C. Goodman, who has reviewed Shawali's confidential file says he was simply a merchant, denounced for a bounty.

Shawali arrived at Guantanamo on February 7, 2003, and was repatriated on December 20, 2014.

== Official status reviews ==
Originally, the Bush Presidency asserted that captives apprehended in the "war on terror" were not covered by the Geneva Conventions, and could be held indefinitely, without charge, and without an open and transparent review of the justifications for their detention. In 2004, the United States Supreme Court ruled, in Rasul v. Bush, that Guantanamo captives were entitled to being informed of the allegations justifying their detention, and were entitled to try to refute them.

=== Office for the Administrative Review of Detained Enemy Combatants ===
Combatant Status Review Tribunals were held in a 3x5 trailer where the captive sat with his hands and feet shackled to a bolt in the floor. Three chairs were reserved for members of the press, but only 37 of the 574 Tribunals were observed.

Following the Supreme Court's ruling the Department of Defense set up the Office for the Administrative Review of Detained Enemy Combatants.

The Department of Defense was forced to publish Summary of Evidence memos from the status reviews convened in 2004, 2005, 2006 and 2007. They also published transcripts and other documents. Scholars at the Brookings Institution, led by Benjamin Wittes, analyzed these documents and listed the captives still held in Guantanamo in December 2008, according to whether their detention was justified by certain common allegations.:

- Shawali Khan was listed as one of the captives who "The military alleges ... are associated with both Al Qaeda and the Taliban."
- Shawali Khan was listed as one of the captives who "The military alleges ... took military or terrorist training in Afghanistan."
- Shawali Khan was listed as one of the captives who "The military alleges ... fought for the Taliban."
- Shawali Khan was listed as one of the captives who "The military alleges that the following detainees were captured under circumstances that strongly suggest belligerency."
- Shawali Khan was listed as one of the captives who was a "Taliban fighters and operatives."
- Shawali Khan was listed as one of the "34 [captives who] admit to some lesser measure of affiliation—like staying in Taliban or Al Qaeda guesthouses or spending time at one of their training camps."
- Shawali Khan was listed as one of the captives who had admitted "fighting on behalf of Al Qaeda or the Taliban."

Khan chose to participate in his Combatant Status Review Tribunal. On March 3, 2006, in response to a court order from Jed Rakoff, the Department of Defense published an eight-page summarized transcript from his Combatant Status Review Tribunal.

==== Witness request ====
Khan had requested two witnesses, who were ruled "not reasonably available", because attempts to access those witnesses, through diplomatic channels, failed.

Khan chose to participate in his first annual Administrative Review Board (ARB) hearing, in 2005, and his third annual ARB hearing in 2007.

==== 2007 recommendation memos ====
Eleven pages of heavily redacted memos containing his third annual review board's recommendations were published in January 2009. His board convened on June 27, 2007. His board's final recommendation memo was drafted on September 18, 2007. Gordon England, the Designated Civilian Official, who, on paper, had the authority to clear Shawali for transfer or release initialed his decision on Shawali's transfer status on September 20, 2007.

=== Formerly secret Joint Task Force Guantanamo assessment ===
On April 25, 2011, whistleblower organization WikiLeaks published formerly secret assessments drafted by Joint Task Force Guantanamo analysts.

=== Guantanamo Review Task Force ===
On January 21, 2009, the day he was inaugurated, United States President Barack Obama issued three Executive orders related to the detention of individuals in Guantanamo. He established a task force to re-review the status of all the remaining captives. Where the OARDEC officials reviewing the status of the captives were all "field grade" officers in the US military (Commanders, naval Captains, Lieutenant Colonels and Colonels) the officials seconded to the task force were drawn from not only the Department of Defense, but also from five other agencies, including the Departments of State, Justice, Homeland Security. President Obama gave the task force a year, and it recommended the release of Shawali Khan and 54 other individuals.

== Repatriation and identity confusion ==
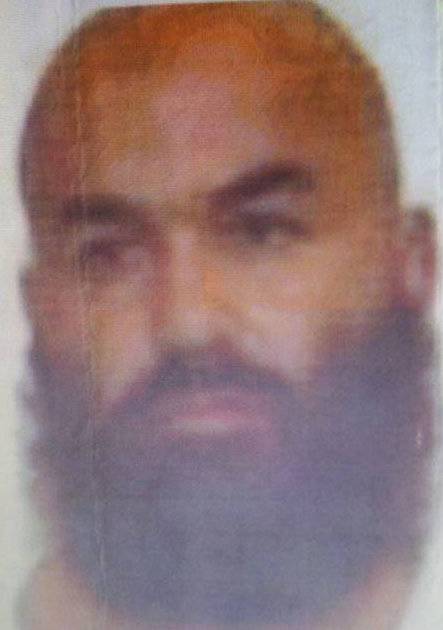
After Mullah Abdul Rauf was reported killed incompetent intelligence officials published this photo of Shawali Khan as an image of him.

Shawali Khan was finally repatriated to Afghanistan on December 20, 2014. On February 9, 2015, US officials announced that a controversial Afghan leader variously known Mullah Abdul Rauf, Abdul Rauf Khadim, and various other names, had been killed by missiles fired from an unmanned aerial vehicle. The controversial Afghan leader had been widely described as a former Guantanamo captive. On February 16, 2015, The New York Times reported that a photo the Defense Department published, claiming it was the recently killed man, was actually a picture of Shawali Khan.

On October 25, 2016, United States District Judge John D. Bates dismissed Khan's petition for habeas corpus as moot. Khan had opposed the dismissal, arguing that, unless his detention was declared illegal, the Afghan government would continue to seize his land, deny him a passport, and prevent him from obtaining treatment for hearing loss he said he suffered from the loud music used in CIA interrogations. While throwing out Khan's lawsuit, Judge Bates wrote he was nevertheless "sympathetic to the pickle".
