= Sarposa prison tunneling escape of 2011 =

Prison escape in Afghanistan

Sarposa Prison
- Part of the War in Afghanistan (2001–present)
Location	Kandahar, Afghanistan 31°37′08″N 65°40′05″E

The Sarposa Prison tunneling escape was the escape of around 475 prisoners from Sarposa Prison in Kandahar in April 2011 by a tunnel dug from the outside. At least 71 of the escapees were reportedly recaptured within days.

== Escape ==
The facility previously experienced a jailbreak in June 2008, after a truck bomb breached the walls and allowed 1,000 prisoners to escape.

The escape was facilitated by a tunnel built by the Taliban over several months. It was over a hundred meters long, and used sophisticated techniques involving electricity, ventilation, and potentially the assistance of engineers. The tunnel ended in a house outside the prison that had been searched by security forces just two and a half months prior, yet with no suspicious activity was reported. Reports have speculated whether it would have been possible to conduct the substantial earth-removal required for the construction of the tunnel without security forces being alerted.

On the day of the escape, militants ferried away the prisoners, mostly former Taliban members, over a period of 4 and a half hours. Before the Afghan government became aware of the attacks, Taliban spokesperson Zaibullah Mujahid claimed responsibility for the operation. Mujahid claimed that the operation was conducted between 11 p.m. and 3 a.m., and had freed approximately 100 Taliban commanders. He also claimed that there had been suicide bombers standing by to distract officials, but they had not been needed.

Ultimately, around 475 prisoners at the central jail managed to escape. At least 71 of the escaped prisoners were reportedly recaptured.

== Reactions ==
Wahid Omar, spokesperson for Afghani president Hamid Karzai, stated:

This is a blow. A prison break of this magnitude of course points to vulnerability and we need to accept this, what made this incident of this magnitude to happen. We'll come back with more details as to what exactly happened and what we're doing to correct it.

Pentagon Spokesperson Col Dave Lapan said that the Afghan government had not asked for US assistance in their investigation.

The head of the team investigating the escape, Mohammed Tahir, further cemented the likelihood of complicity from a number of people. He described the tunnel as so carefully planned and sophisticated that it appeared that engineers, not merely men with shovels, must have been involved. "The tunnel was dug in a very professional way," said Tahir. "They have used an electrical system and a ventilation system and small shovels and pickaxes for digging and wheelbarrows for removing the soil."

Some escapees discussed the fact that "friends" had supplied keys and aided in the escape.

== See also ==
- Sarposa Prison attack of 2008
- Ghazni prison escape
