= Arghandab District, Kandahar =

Settlement in Afghanistan

Arghandab District ارغنداب
- District
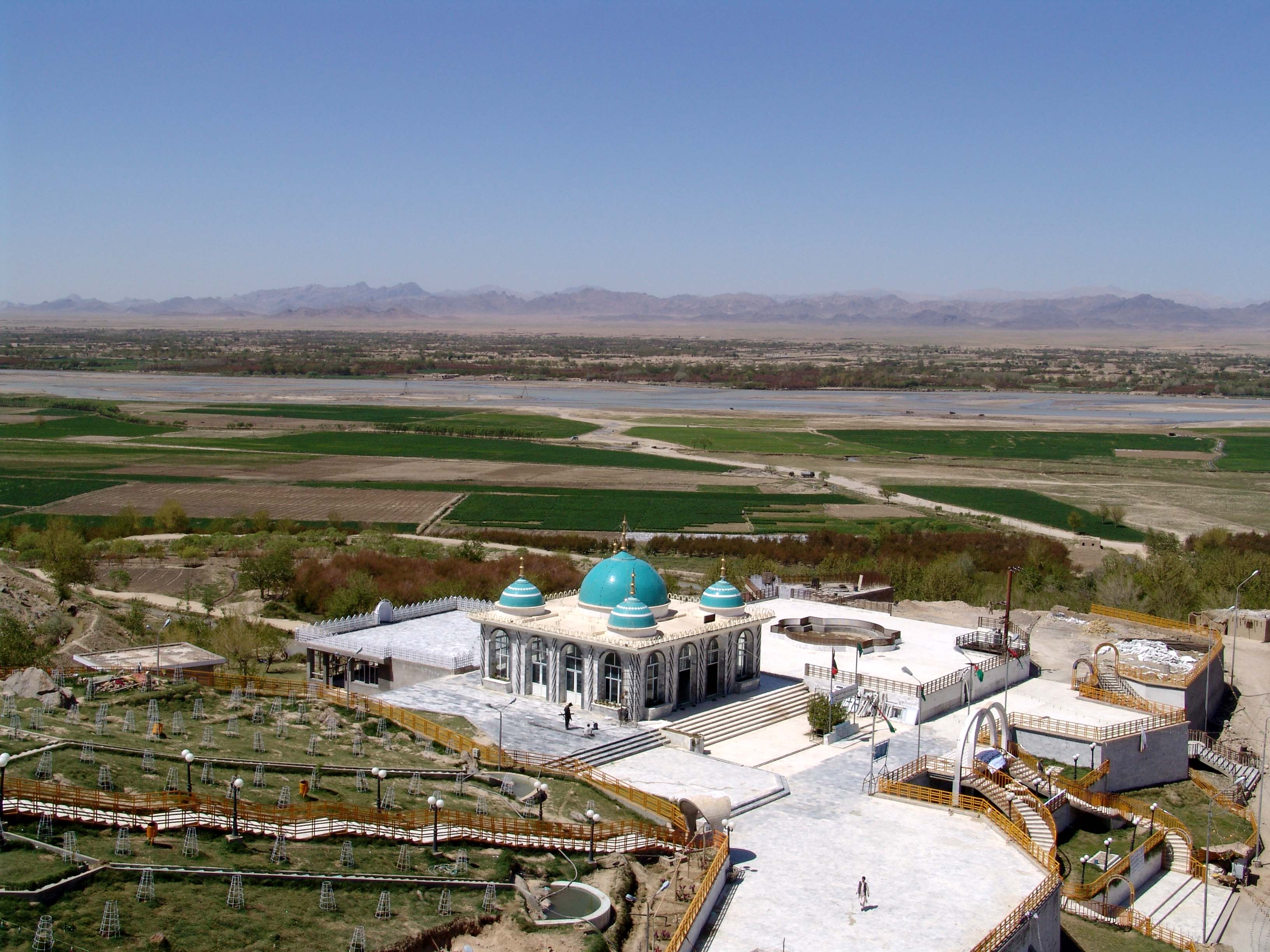
- The Shrine of Baba Wali in the Arghandab district.

- Location in Afghanistan (Dot on the town of Arghandab)
- Coordinates: 31°39′17″N 65°38′58″E
- Country: Afghanistan
- Province: Kandahar Province
- Center: Town of Arghandab
- Elevation: 1,112 m (3,648 ft)

Population (2006)
  - Total: 54,900
- Time zone: + 4.30
- Website: Arghandab.com

Arghandab (Pashto: ارغنداب) is a district in the central part of Kandahar Province, Afghanistan. It borders Panjwai and Khakrez districts to the west, Shah Wali Kot District to the north and east and Kandahar District to the east and south.

The population, as of 2006, was 54,900. The district centre is Arghandab, located northwest of Kandahar. The Arghandab River flows through the district in its eastern part West from the district center, and the area is irrigated by the Helmand and Arghandab Valley Authority. The climate, river and irrigation allow the inhabitants to aggregate several different forms of produce. The main agricultural crops in this region are pomegranates, grapes, plums, and Cannabis sativa.

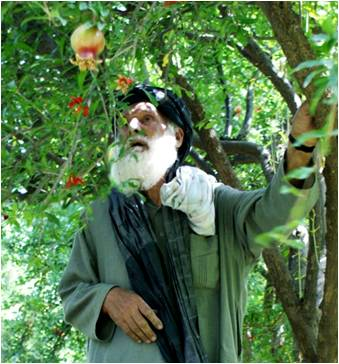
Fruit farmer in Arghandab District

== History ==
Arghandab has historically been referred to as the gateway to Kandahar, as its river valley provides the primary northern route through overlooking ridges for commerce and military movements. Control of the valley strategically secured northern access to Kandahar City. Following the 2001 invasion, the district was secured by the Alkozai tribe under the leadership of former mujahideen commander Mullah Naqib. The strong local cohesion and militia presence under Naqib served as a barrier against advances by the Taliban toward Kandahar in both 1994 and 2007.

== War in Afghanistan ==
The district was the site of the Battle of Arghandab in June 2008.

On 16 November 2009, Taliban attackers raided a police station, killing eight officers and wounding three. Three other police officers in the station disappeared, and a spokesman for the Kandahar governor's office, who asked not to be identified by name, said he was not sure if the officers who disappeared had a connection to the Taliban.

On 9 June 2010, a suicide attack at a wedding party in the village of Nagahan of the Arghandab district killed at least 40 people and wounded 77, making it one of the worst attacks of the year.

From November 2020, there have been multiple attempted takeovers of the district by Taliban. As of December 9, 2020, the district remains contested, with the Taliban believed to be occupying the area along the western bank and Afghan security forces believed to be occupying the eastern bank (including the Baba Wali Shrine).

On December 24, 2020, Afghan forces recaptured the entirety of the district, killing 37 insurgents in the process.

== Notables ==
- Mullah Naqib
- Shahwali Khan
- Tayyab Agha
- Syed Muhammad Akbar Agha
- Niamatullah Arghandabi

== See also ==
- Khosrow Sofla
