= Arghandab, Afghanistan =

Settlement in Kandahar Province

Arghandab
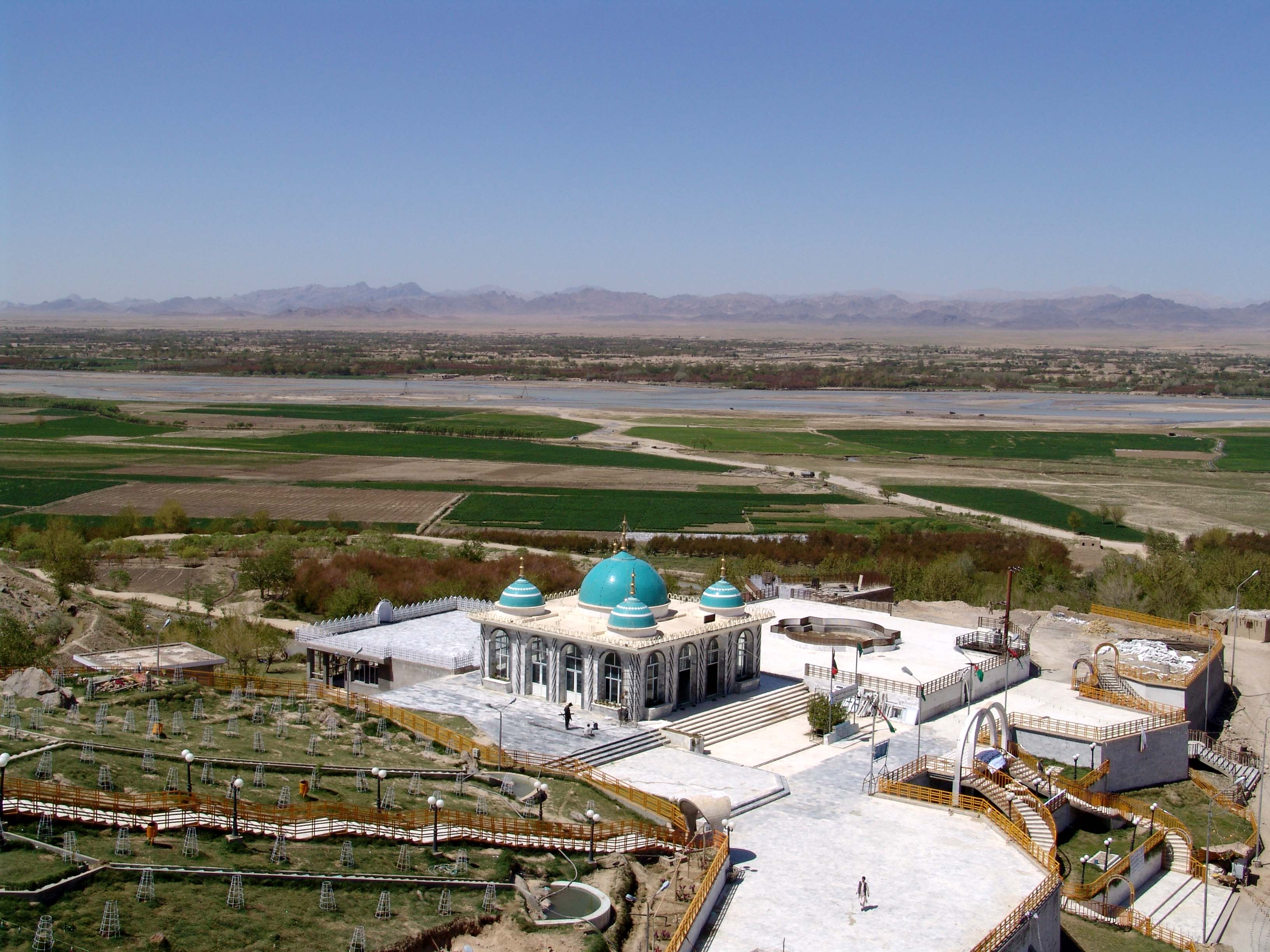

- Location in Afghanistan
- Coordinates: 31°39′17″N 65°38′58″E
- Country: Afghanistan
- Province: Kandahar Province
- District: Arghandab District
- Elevation: 3,648 ft (1,112 m)
- Time zone: + 4.30

The town of Arghandab (Pashto: ارغنداب) is the center of Arghandab District in Kandahar Province, Afghanistan. It is located within the valley of Arghandab River northwest from Kandahar. Its coordinates are 31.6547°N 65.6494°E and sits at an elevation of 1,112 metres (3,648 ft).

== History ==
The city was known to the Ancient Greeks as Arachotius and prior to the conquests of Alexander the Great was capital of the satrapy of Arachosia.

Latter, the Roman writer. Stephen of Byzantium said the name of the city had been Κωφήν, and mediaeval Chinese writers called the city a similar name, Kaofu.

In 2008, during the US occupation of Afghanistan, the Battle of Arghandab was fought near the city between NATO forces and Taliban insurgents.
