= Mullah Naqibullah =

Afghan politician and mujahid (1950-2007)

- الحاج ملانقيب الله اخند
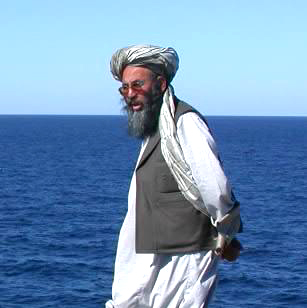
- Naqibullah in his later years
- Born: 1950; Arghandab District, Kandahar, Afghanistan
- Died: October 11, 2007 (aged 56–57); Arghandab District, Afghanistan
- Resting place: Arghandab District, Afghanistan
- Occupation: Tribal chief
- Known for: Afghan mujahideen commander, anti-Taliban leader
- Successor: Haji Karimullah Naqibi

Mullah Naqibullah (Pashto: ملا نقیب الله) (c. 1950 – 11 October 2007) was an Afghan mujahideen commander, who later became a politician in Kandahar, Afghanistan. He belonged to the Alakozai tribe of Pashtuns, and was one of a prominent leaders of that tribe. His son Haji Kalimullah Naqibi is the chief of the Alakozai tribe.

== Early years ==
Naqibullah was born in or about 1950 in Arghandab District of Kandahar Province. During his adult years, he was serving in the Afghan army under Nur Muhammad Taraki and was stationed at Bala Hissar in Kabul. He left the army in August 1979 and later joined the Afghan mujahideen.

== Mujahideen commander ==
Naqibullah gained respect as a military leader during the Soviet–Afghan War, when he fought against Soviet-backed military forces of the People's Democratic Party of Afghanistan (PDPA). In 1984, he became affiliated with Burhanuddin Rabbani's Jamiat-e Islami party. The Jamiat was often perceived as having a constituency limited to the Tajik community, so Rabbani was especially careful to cultivate his relations with the few Pashtun commanders willing to join him, such as Naqibullah.

Naqibullah's forces built a fortified base in Arghandab, that the PDPA troops repeatedly, and unsuccessfully tried to destroy. In June 1987, a large force of PDPA troops, spearheaded by tanks and supported by Soviet artillery attacked into Arghandab. After a week of hard fighting in the "green zone", the dense agricultural area along the Arghandab valley, the force approached the main mujahideen at Chaharqulba. Dismayed by their inability to stop the advancing armour, some mujahideen commanders suggested to Naqib that they should withdraw. A commander described the interview:

Finally, we Mujahideen commanders went to Naqib and said that we are outnumbered and should leave the base. Naqib said that this is their last battle and will decide the contest between them and us.[...] We replied that the RPGs were not working against the sandbagged tanks. Naqib took an RPG and strode out to the forward positions to kill a tank. We commanders stopped him and promised to fight to the end.

Eventually, the government troops withdrew, having suffered heavy casualties.

Naqibullah is also said to have personally shot down three Mi-24 gunships using Stinger missiles supplied by the CIA. His military record gave him a heroic status among the local population.

Naqibullah by his own admission executed at least thirty suspected traitors or captured enemy soldiers.

== Later career ==
After the collapse of the PDPA and resignation of President Mohammad Najibullah in 1992, the mujahideen took control of Kandahar. Gul Agha Sherzai was nominally the governor but he lacked authority, as each group sought to carve itself a territory to control. Naqibullah was the most powerful commander in the city, and many of his subordinates turned to illegal taxation and theft, in order to earn an income. The situation remained calm until 1993, when sporadic clashes erupted between different factions.

The lawlessness in Kandahar paved the way for the rise of the Taliban movement. On November 3, 1994, Naqibullah and his 2,500 men did not resist the advance of the Taliban, allowing them to capture the city, and, in exchange, he was permitted to retire safely into his bastion in Arghandab. This led to widespread suspicions that he had been bribed, but there is also evidence that he was acting under orders from Rabbani, the President in Kabul.

== Role in post-Taliban Afghanistan ==
Naqibullah reemerged as the Taliban regime began to dissolve following the 2001 US invasion of Afghanistan. He managed to broker a deal between Hamid Karzai and Taliban leader Mullah Omar, allowing the surrender of 3,000 Taliban in Kandahar. However, his rivalry with Gul Agha Sherzai also resurfaced, and their forces clashed, as Sherzai's men seized several key positions, with the support of US airstrikes. Karzai later defused the situation, by brokering a power sharing agreement, whereby Sherzai was made governor, and the post of vice-governor was attributed to Naqibullah, who gave it to his brother-in-law. Americans and their Afghan allies suspected Naqibullah of helping Mullah Omar escape Kandahar before they arrived. Even though Omar had handed over Kandahar over to Naqibullah, the night before Omar was to surrender, him and other senior Taliban leaders disappeared. Naqibullah denied having any knowledge of how Omar escaped.

After once again retiring to his tribal area in Arghandab, Naqibullah became a powerful asset for the government in its struggle against the Taliban. His tribal militia prevented them from gaining influence in the district, that is considered critical to the defense of Kandahar. He thus became a prime objective for Taliban assassins, who targeted him with a bombing attack in early March 2007, leaving him badly injured. After receiving treatment for several months in India, Naqibullah returned to Afghanistan, to witness a deteriorating security situation. He warned of an impending Taliban attack, and advised against the planned withdrawal of Canadian ISAF troops from Kandahar province, scheduled for 2009.

Naqibullah died of a heart attack on October 11, 2007. Thousands of people, including President Hamid Karzai, attended his funeral. His death was severe blow to the U.S-led coalition and to the Afghan government, that left the Arghandab district open to attack by the Taliban. He is buried in Arghandab district.
